= Murray Seeman =

Lawyer and real estate developer (1914–2017)

- Born: Murray Seeman; July 7, 1914; Ridgewood, Queens, New York, US
- Died: October 14, 2017 (aged 103); Great Neck Estates, New York, US
- Citizenship: United States
- Education: B.A. Brooklyn College; J.D. Columbia Law School
- Occupations: Real estate developer, lawyer
- Years active: 1938–2010
- Spouse: Lee Sachs
- Children: 4, including Roxanne
- Military career
- Allegiance: United States
- Branch: United States Army
- Service years: 1941–1945
- Rank: Captain
- Units: 6th Port Headquarters, Transportation Corps
- Conflicts: World War II: European theatre of World War II
- Awards: European-African-Middle Eastern Campaign Medal; Meritorious Service Medal; American Defense Service Medal

Murray Seeman (July 7, 1914 – October 14, 2017) was an American lawyer and real estate developer on Long Island, New York. He was known for his contributions to the community as Mayor of Great Neck Estates, as a World War II veteran and a Biblical scholar.

Seeman entered the US Army in 1942, serving in the Quartermaster Corps with the 6th Port Headquarters in Morocco, Italy and France during World War II. His military specialty was Army Exchange Officer. He served as a judge for a Summary Military Court of the Allied Military Government Court in Naples, Italy appointed by Lt. Col. Kincaid in 1944 and as a trial advocate and defense attorney. The 6th Port was awarded the Meritorious Service Plaque for Superior Performance In Control and Execution of its Port Missions, 1945.

A clip from Seeman's NSTV Veterans History Story interview filmed in 2009 was included in a compilation program of World War II veteran stories that was nominated for a New York Emmy in the Military Program category in 2013.

On November 7, 2020, the Library of Congress, Veterans History Project 20th Anniversary Event Celebration live-streamed a song performance with an introduction by Mark Sweeney, Principal Deputy Librarian featuring Murray Seeman's quote from the NSTV on-camera interview.

== Early life and education ==
Seeman was born on July 7, 1914, to a Jewish family in Ridgewood, Queens, New York, the son of Dora (née Schachter) and Benjamin, both of Hungarian descent. He was the eldest of three children, with two sisters, Florence and Shirley. Seeman was an avid reader of the Sentinel's The Sabbath Angel Young Folks' Page Riddle Box, conducted by Judith Ish-kishor, corresponding with answers to the puzzles and charades.

Seeman graduated from Boys’ High School in Brooklyn, 1931. He attended Brooklyn College where he and Sylvia Lopotkin, student council representatives, arranged the first semi-annual declamation contest conducted by Brooklyn College in the Brooklyn Law School Auditorium. New York Supreme Court Justice John MacCrate, Vida R. Sutton, speech director of the National Broadcasting Company, and Professor Joseph Mosher of City College were the judges. More than 300 persons heard eight finalists deliver selections.

In 1933, Alfred Giardino, Capt. and Murray Seeman were the representatives of the Brooklyn College Varsity Debating Team in a series of debates defeating Rutgers College, Rider College, and Penn State on upholding the affirmative of the question "Resolved: That Soviet Russia should be officially recognized by the U.S. Government", the negative of the question "Resolved: That the Interallied War Debts be Cancelled by the United States", and the negative on the cancellation of War debts by the United States, respectively.

The Brooklyn College student council awarded silver keys to Seeman and Giardino. In the college election, Murray Seeman, along with Henry Helbraun and Jacob Seigfreid were elected to head the upper juniors.

In 1934, Seeman received a BA from Brooklyn College and was voted "most likely to succeed" in his class.

During the Great Depression, he worked two jobs while attending Columbia Law School, where he graduated with a J.D. in 1937.

== World War II ==
In 1941, Murray Seeman was inducted into the U.S. Army. He attended Officer Candidate School and Quartermaster training at Camp Lee, Virginia, graduating on July 3, and commissioned second lieutenant in the US Army.

Seeman was transferred from Camp Lee to Fort Hamilton, in Brooklyn, where he joined the 6th Port Headquarters, an Army unit, under the command of R. Hunter Clarkson, that he would stay with until the end of the War.

The 6th Port was a transportation unit, responsible for the movement of troops and supplies, loading and unloading the ships and looking after the troops from the ports. The 6th Port worked ports in Casablanca, Marseille, and Naples, where they looked after 50,000 troops.

In an interview filmed by NSTV, Seeman recounted loading the troops of the First Division, known as the Big Red One, onto the Queen Mary on its wartime voyage to England. The following day, November 2, 1942, the 6th Port departed the Brooklyn Navy Yard on a Swedish flat-bottom crossing the ocean for ten days towards an undisclosed location. The 6th Port arrived in the harbor of Morocco, North Africa during the Battle of Casablanca, waiting in a convoy of a hundred ships for the Battle to be over before they could be brought in to land on November 18, 1942.

The 6th Port continued their mission with the United States Fifth Army leaving Casablanca by train with 2–3 days in Iran, arriving Naples in October 1943.

While in Naples, the Fifth Army, headed by Lieutenant General Mark W. Clark, fought the Battle of Monte Cassino, fifteen miles away.

During his service in Naples, Seeman served as the defense lawyer for 25 soldiers in a military court trial. He tried the case and won, returning a not guilty verdict. Seeman's argument for the defense centered around the legal principle of presumption of innocence in the American criminal justice system, which confirmed his belief in the American legal system.

Thirty-eight of Murray Seeman's relatives were killed during The Holocaust.

== Veterans History Project, American Folklife Center, Library of Congress ==
In 2020, Murray Seeman's World War II Collection of video interviews, photos and letters were donated by his daughter, Roxanne Seeman to the Veterans History Project at the American Folklife Center, Library of Congress, Washington, D.C.

=== Veterans History Project 20th Anniversary Celebration Event ===
On November 7, 2020, as part of the Veterans History Project 20th Anniversary Celebration Event, the Library of Congress live-streamed her song tribute performance "In Love And War" with an introduction by Mark Sweeney, Principal Deputy Librarian featuring a videoclip quote from Murray Seeman and dedicating it to the veterans of the Greatest Generation and their legacies.

"What we went through in World War II, what the Army went through and what the public went through too, is simply a source of inspiration that revives our faith and our confidence in the American people and what they stand for."

— Murray Seeman,

Murray Seeman donated a flag previously flown over the United States Military Cemetery in Carthage, Tunisia, where 2,841 American military personnel are buried, for a Memorial Day parade in 2012. The flag was presented to him by the director of the cemetery in Tunisia on a visit after the war, as Seeman participated in the invasion of Morocco .

== Career ==
Seeman practiced law for three years before he was drafted to serve in the US Army June 5, 1941.

After serving in World War II, Seeman worked as an attorney in private practice and as a real estate developer. He served on the New York State Pension & Retirement Commission under Governor Hugh Carey.

== Mayor, Great Neck Estates and community service ==
As mayor of Great Neck Estates, Murray Seeman was one of the first community leaders to take a stand against nuclear proliferation.

In 1975, Great Neck Estates was one of the earliest communities to enact a local ordinance to remove pollution on private and public property caused by dogs, a law passed three years later as the Pooper-scooper Law in New York State. Among his pursuits, he was an advocate for environmental protection, the prevention of dumping in the Long Island Sound, the ecology of Udalls Cove and the restriction of offshore hunting.

President, Jamaica-Richmond Hill Civic League, 1955

Trustee for the Village of Great Neck Estates, 1967 to 1974

Mayor, Village of Great Neck Estates, 1975 to 1983

President of the Great Neck Estates Civic Association and the Great Neck Lawyer's Club.

North Shore Archeological Society, co-founder (NSAS) with Norma Kershaw. He wrote articles and lectured on the bible and archeology.

== Recognition ==
The 6th Port was Awarded the Meritorious Service Plaque for Superior Performance In Control and Execution of its Port Missions, 1945

New York State Bar Association Award of Merit, 1985

New York Emmy nomination, World War II Veterans Stories program, Military Program, on-camera contributor, 2013

Lifetime Achievement, Brooklyn College, 2014

Senate resolution upon the occasion of Murray Seeman's 100th Birthday, 2015

Community Service Award, Great Neck Chamber of Commerce, 2015

== Personal life and death ==
Seeman was married Lee née Sachs, Town Councilwoman of North Hempstead from 2005 to 2021 and appointed by President Clinton to serve on the United States Commission for the Preservation of America's Heritage Abroad. Seeman died on October 14, 2017, at 103 of natural causes in Great Neck, New York.
