= Deborah Pessin =

American Jewish writer (1910-2001)

Deborah Pessin (Hebrew: דבורה פסין) (1910-2001) (later known as Deborah Margolis) was an American-Jewish author known for her works for children on topics of Jewish history and Jewish folklore.

== Overview ==
Pessin's view of Jewish history education was that it was the subject best positioned to convey to children the achievements of the Jewish people and to inculcate them with feelings of Jewish pride. According to the American Association for Jewish Education's 1959 survey of Jewish schools in the United States, Pessin's The Jewish People was among the most widely used history texts.

== Awards ==
In 1954, Pessin received the Jewish Book Council's Isaac Siegel Memorial Award (now the National Jewish Book Award for Children's Literature) for her work The Jewish People.

== Works ==
- Ahad Ha'am, Zionist Organization of America (ZOA) (1938)
- Giants on the Earth: Stories of Great Jewish Men and Women from the Time of the Discovery of America to the Present, Behrman's Jewish Book House (1940)
- The Jewish Kindergarten: A Manual for Teachers by Deborah Pessin and Temima Gezari, Union of American Hebrew Congregations (1944)
- The Aleph Bet Story Book by Deborah Pessin and illustrated by Howard Simon, Jewish Publication Society (1946)
- Michael Turns the Globe, by Deborah Pessin and illustrated by Howard Simon, Union of American Hebrew Congregations (1946)
- Theodore Herzl, by Deborah Pessin and illustrated by Laszlo Matulay, ZOA/Behrman's Jewish Book House, 1948.
- The Jewish People (Volumes 1–3), United Synagogue Commission on Jewish Education (1952-1953)
- History of the Jews in America, United Synagogue Commission on Jewish Education (1957)
- Freud and His Mother: Preoedipal Aspects of Freud's Personality by Deborah P. Margolis, Jason Aronson (1977)

== See also ==
- Sulamith Ish-Kishor
