= Ben Rebhuhn House =

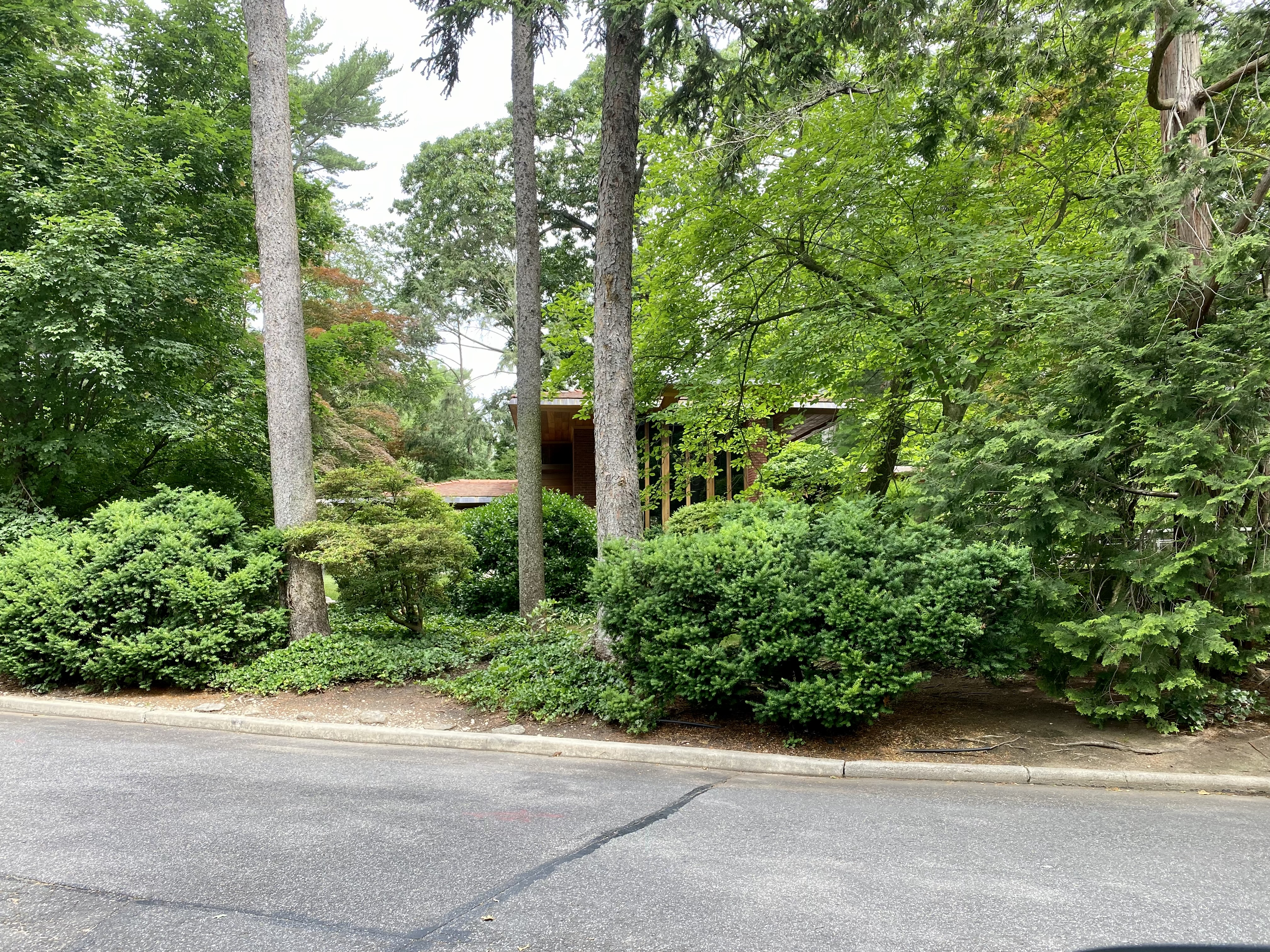
- The home from the street on June 11, 2021.

- Location within New York City

General information
- Type: House
- Architectural style: Usonian
- Location: Great Neck Estates, New York
- Coordinates: 40°47′16″N 73°44′13″W
- Construction started: 1937

Design and construction
- Architect: Frank Lloyd Wright

The Ben Rebhuhn House was built in Great Neck Estates, New York, in 1937. The only home on Long Island designed by Frank Lloyd Wright, it was designed at the request of Benjamin and Anne Rebhuhn, publishers of progressive content. This house is similar to the Ernest Vosburgh House in Grand Beach, Michigan, except that this house is in the Usonian style while the Vosburgh residence, built 21 years earlier, was in the Prairie style. The house follows a cruciform plan. It features a two-story living room and is built from tidewater red cypress board and batten inside and out, with brick and red roof tile. Notable owners of the house have included Texas oil heiress Diane Reid.

== See also ==
- List of Frank Lloyd Wright works
