= Lee Seeman =

American Democratic politician

- Born: Leah Rose Sachs
- Citizenship: United States
- Education: University of Miami
- Spouse: Murray Seeman
- Children: 4, including Roxanne

Lee R. Seeman is a former member of the U.S. Commission for the Preservation of America's Heritage Abroad, the agency of the U.S. Government charged with helping to protect and preserve memorials, historic sites, buildings, cemeteries, and other property in Central and Eastern Europe, including parts of the former Soviet Union, important to the foreign heritage of Americans. Seeman was appointed by President Bill Clinton in 1995 and reappointed by President George W. Bush.

Seeman was involved in raising funds to build monuments in Eastern and Central Europe dedicated to those who perished in the Holocaust, including the preservation of one of the largest cemeteries in Wyszków, Poland and markers at the sites of former slave labor camps in Estonia during World War II. In Riga, Latvia she created a memorial for a desecrated cemetery that dated back to 1725. During The Holocaust, 1,000 Jews were killed and buried in a mass grave there. The Riga monument bears a stone scroll explaining the history.

She was a delegate to the Democratic National Convention in 1996, representing Greater Long Island. Seeman served as Town Councilwoman in the Town of North Hempstead, District 5, New York from 2005 to 2022 She represented the villages of Saddle Rock, Great Neck Estates, Great Neck Plaza, Russell Gardens, University Gardens, Lake Success, North New Hyde Park, Garden City Park, Floral Park and other unincorporated areas. Formerly, Seeman was a New York State committeewoman and the 16th Assembly District leader of North Hempstead. She was co-chairman of the Clinton campaign in Nassau County. January 2022, the Village of Great Neck Plaza designated a portion of Bond Street to be named “Lee Seeman Way”.

== Early life and education ==
Lee R. Seeman was born and grew up in Jackson Heights, Queens, daughter of Mollie née Getzug and Leon C. Sachs, an insurance company owner and former President of Temple Emanuel of Queens, New York. Her mother, Mollie Getzug, was a millinery buyer for stores in Charlotte, North Carolina, Cincinnati and Columbus, Ohio, and others in the Southeast. Her uncles on her maternal side were five brothers who were jewelers, owning Getz Jewelry in Ohio and Mayor’s Jewelry in Florida. Her family on her paternal side dates to Israel in the 1800s. Her great-grandfather Michal HaCohen edited the first Hebrew newspaper in Palestine and founded Nahalat Shiva, the first town outside the walls of Jerusalem.HaCohen was one of the representatives of the Jews welcoming Franz Joseph I of Austria on his trip to Jerusalem, receiving a new printing press from the emperor in appreciation.

Seeman attended the University of Miami.

== Personal life ==
In 1953, Lee married Murray Seeman, a lawyer and real estate developer who served as a captain with the US Army during World War II. Together they had four children.
