= Motocrotte =

Motorized vehicle designed to vacuum up dog faeces in France

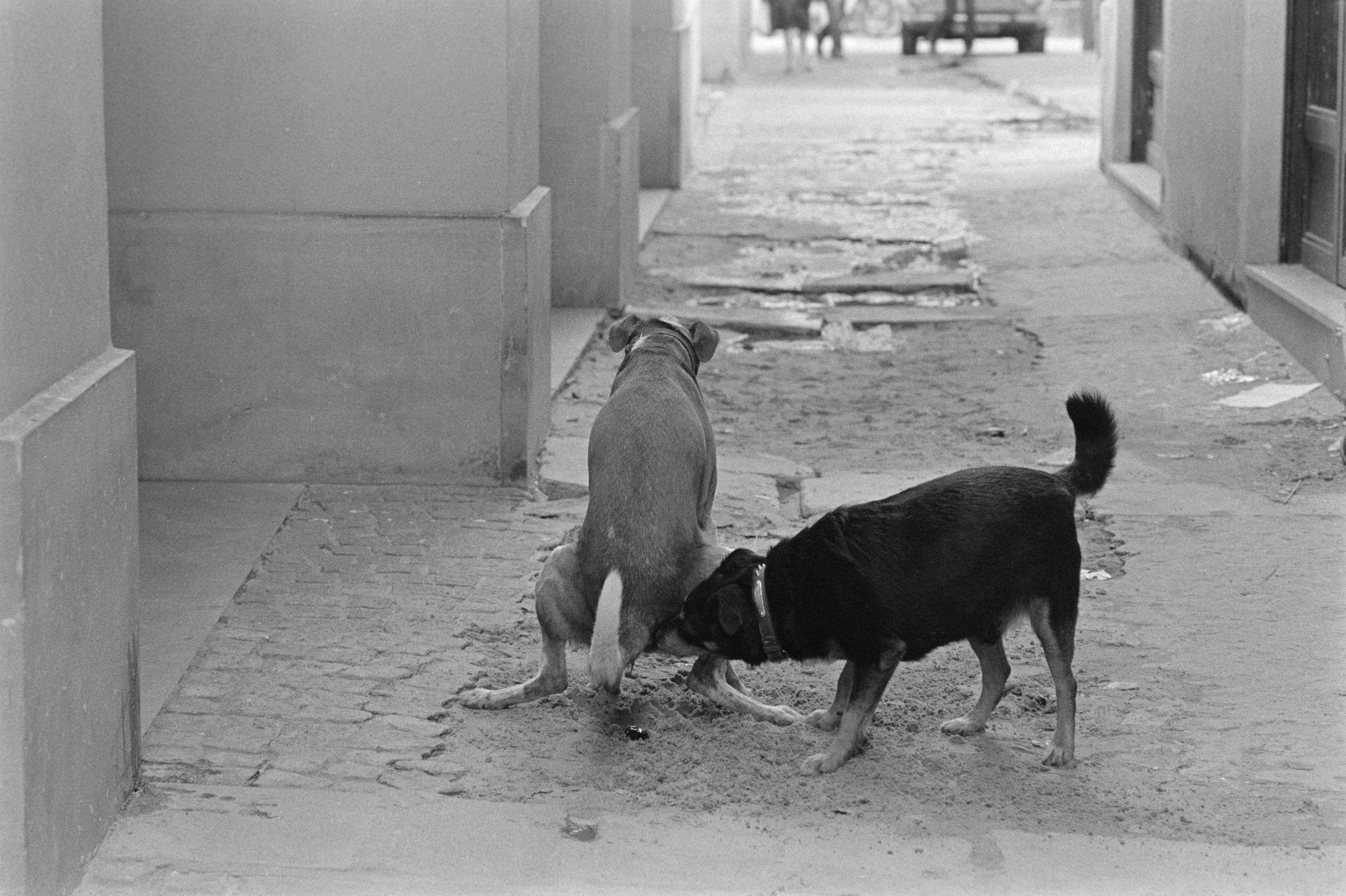
A dog defecates in a Paris alley in autumn 1982, shortly after the city introduced motocrotte vehicles specifically for dog poop cleanup.

A Motocrotte, meaning "crudmobile", (officially Caninette) was a type of motorcycle with a powerful vacuum that had one specific purpose within urban sanitation: to suck dog poop off the Paris sidewalks. From 1982 to 2002, the city of Paris paid patrollers to operate a fleet of 100 motocrotte vehicles through the most heavily-soiled sidewalks of Paris. Every day, an estimated 20 tons of canine feces were left sitting in the city's streets.

Paris faced a far more intense dog poop problem than other cities, likely due to the French population's cultural unwillingness to deal with dog feces and the immense popularity of dogs (with France described as having the highest dog ownership rate). In the 1990s, an estimated 650 people were hospitalized after slipping in it each year, and medical experts warned of heightened pathogen and parasite risks.

Motocrotte vehicles were called "one of the most celebrated of Parisian institutions, almost as well-known as the Eiffel Tower of the Arc de Triomphe" (Irish Independent).

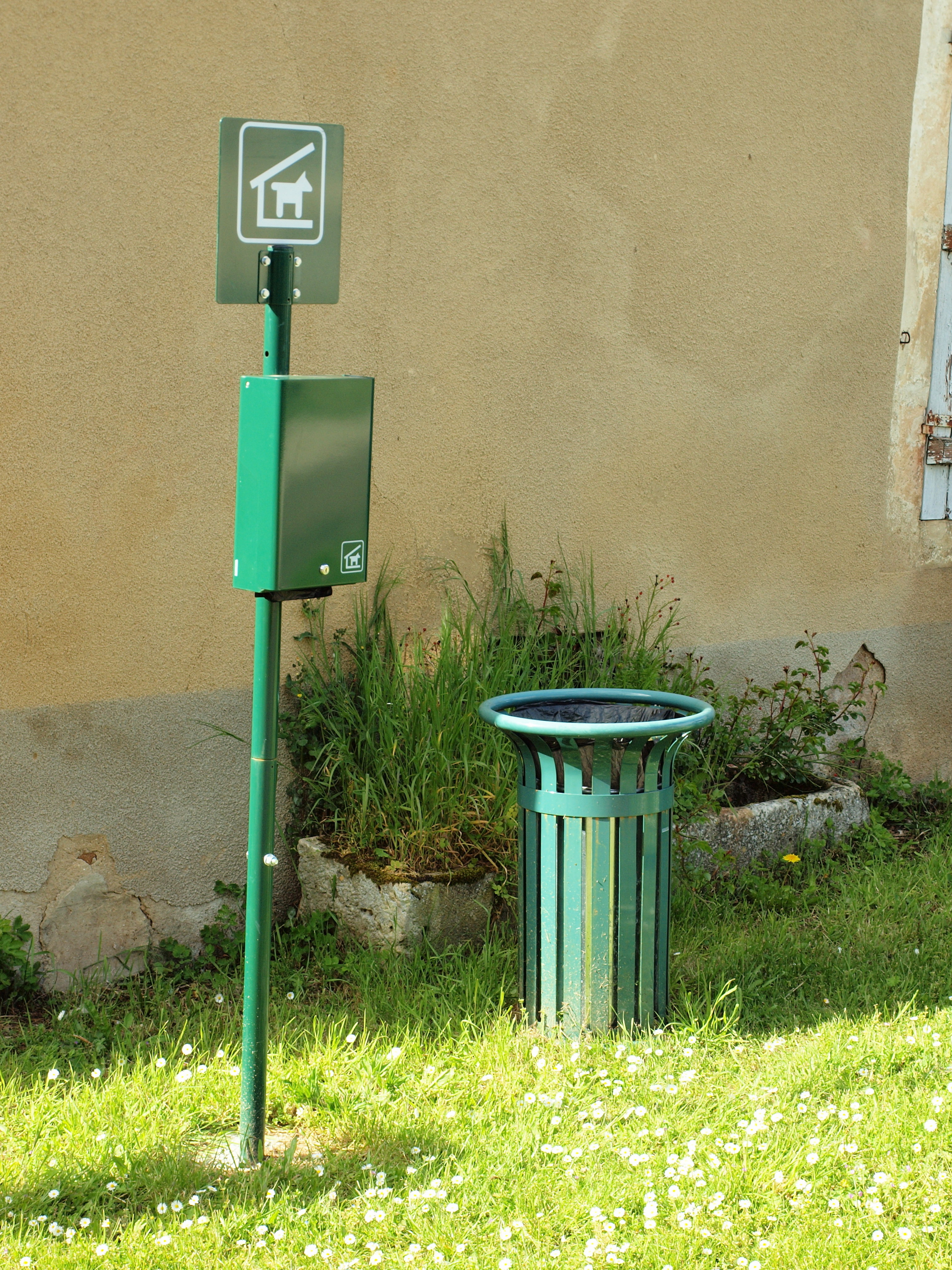
Doggy bags are now available in France for owners to pick up after their dogs, a practice that was uncommon in decades past

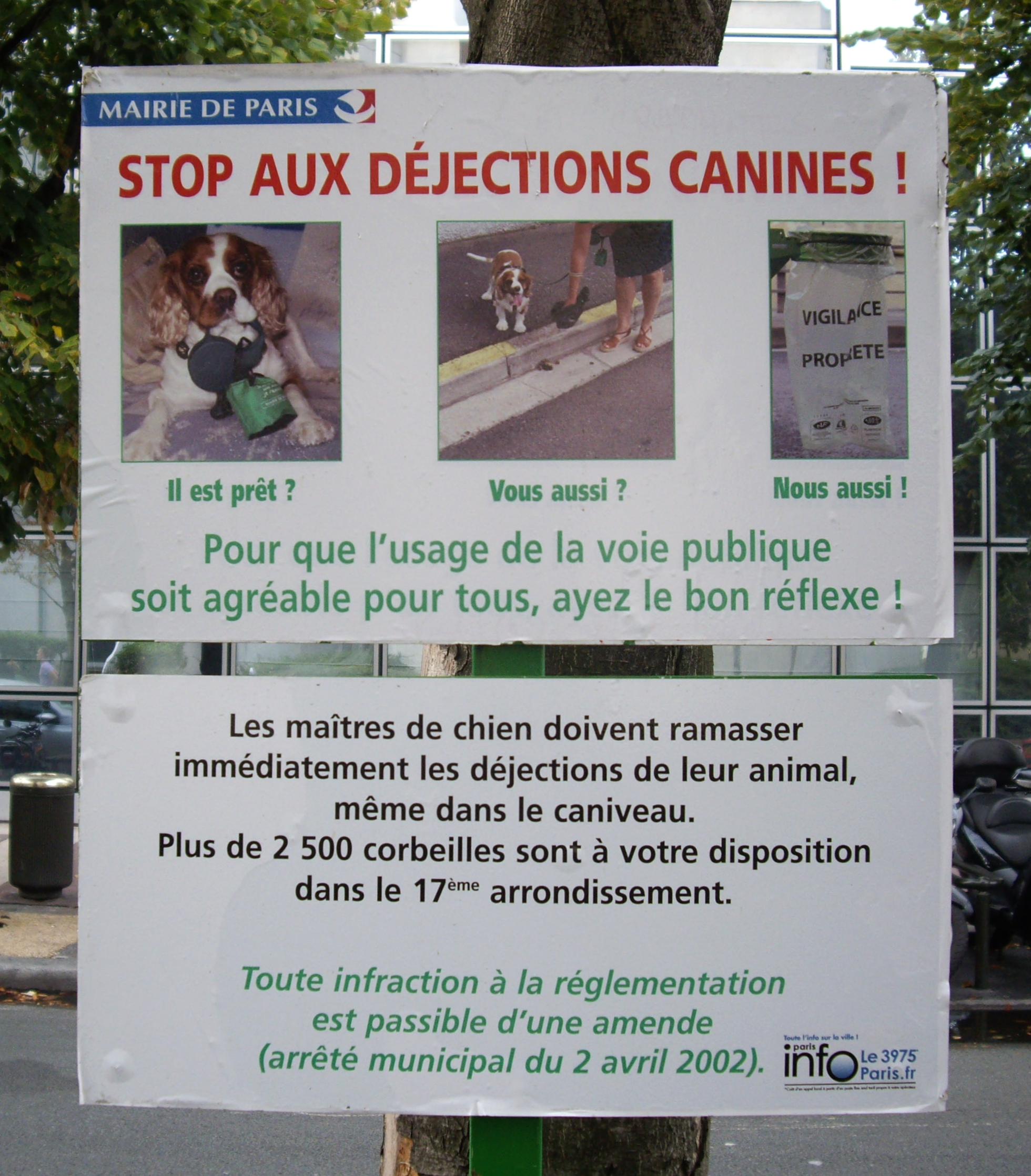
A French public notice in Paris urges "Stop dog droppings!" and warns that dog owners who fail to clean up after their dog will be fined.

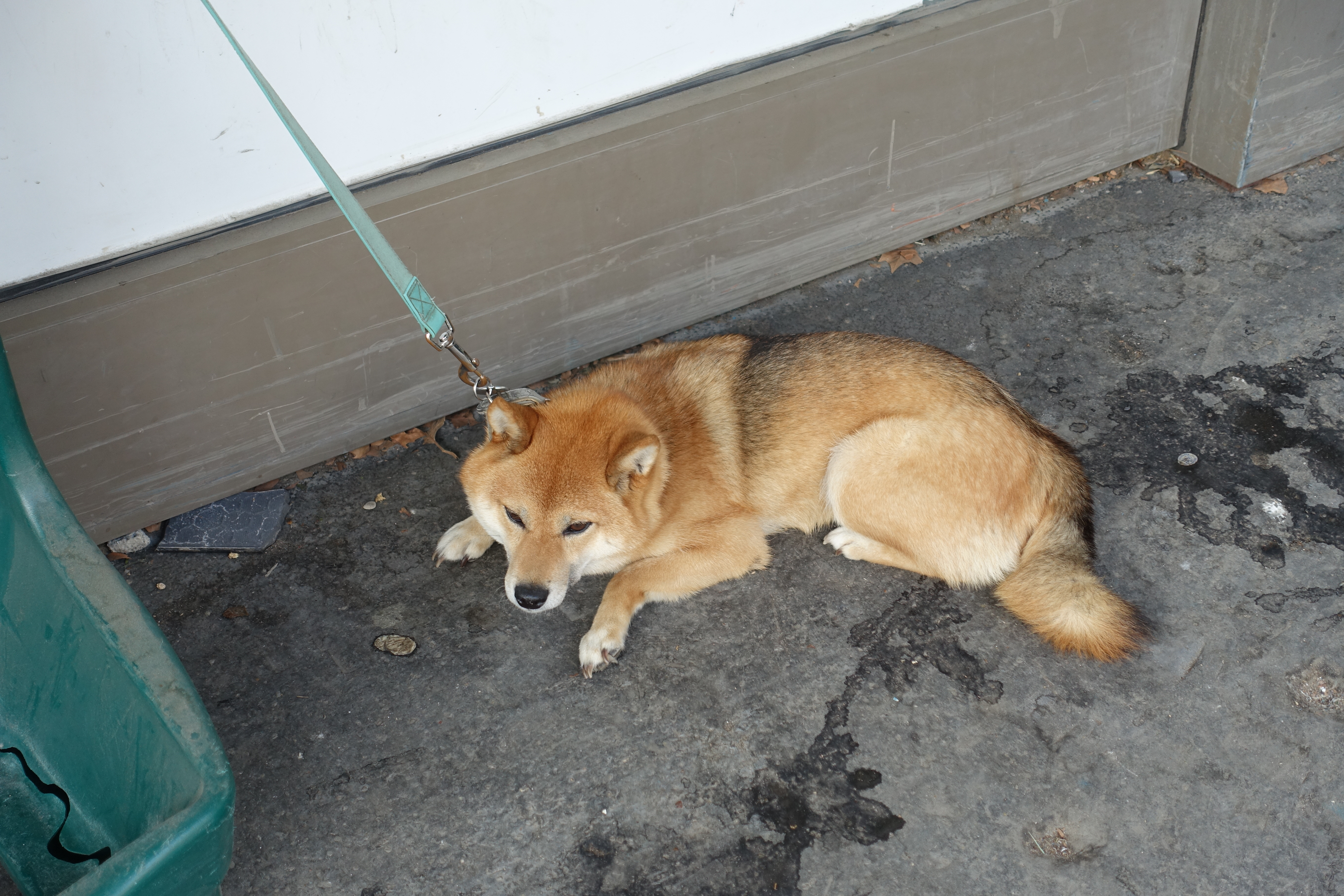
Paris has a long and colorful history of waste disposal, and it is home to many dogs.

== Background of the dog poop problem in Paris ==
Public dog poop has been called "the most intractable Parisian problem". In 1977, Jaques Chirac won the first French municipal election for mayor of Paris, a position he held for 18 years until he was elected President of France in 1995. Over his 18 years, Chirac created expensive and elaborate systems to alleviate the dog poop problem in the streets, but failed to lead to prevention.

On 20 November 1979, the Paris interprefectoral order on sanitary regulations declared that dogs must restrict their "natural functions" to gutters and other designated areas, with the owner at risk of 600 and 1300-franc fines for non-compliance.

However, in practice, violators who left piles of dog poop on the pavement were rarely penalized, perhaps because Mayor Chirac feared losing their political support. Instead of enforcement, he focused funds on anti-excrement campaigns and elaborate cleanup systems, such as dog "urinals" that cost the city $17,000 each. In 1980, Mayor Chirac launched the "apprenez-lui le caniveau!" ("teach him the gutter!") campaign for dog owners to direct their pets' poop into gutters or dog urinals, created with ad agency Young and Rubican. In ubiquitous posters and an educational dog booklet called ½ million d’autres Parisiens, distributed to 200,000 people, Paris officials promoted the use of designated dog defecation spots. Mayor Chirac posed with his own dog Jasmine, a Braque d’Auvergne named Jasmine that he was given by Giscard d’Estaing. The city commissioned a study that provided categories of dog owners in Paris (sensitized, passive sensitized, authoritarian sensitized, unconcerned, and impervious).

Unfortunately, these tactics failed to reduce the volume of feces covering the pavements of Paris. A vast majority of Parisians reported "no change" in street cleanliness in a poll published early 1981. Though the campaign aimed to dog owners of their responsibilities, the poll found that just 21% of dog owners and 14% of non-dog owners believed it had done so.

=== Motocrotte vehicles and further efforts ===
With dog owners unwilling to take the slightest responsibility for Paris's sidewalk feces, city officials resigned to cleaning up after their residents. In 1982, to supplement to the city's daily street sweeping (which did not address the increasingly poop-covered sidewalks) Paris purchased its first fleet Motocrotte vehicles, bright green modified Yamaha XT 600 scooters. A crew of cleaners called décrotteurs were hired to be a mobile strike force, accessing heavily-soiled sidewalks to collect poop. The scooters had a large tank at the rear which housed both water and waste, and from the 1985 edition onward, Motocrotte vehicles were outfitted with a vacuum hose strong enough to suction turds off the sidewalk. They scoured sidewalks twice per day, during mid-morning and late evening, peak dog traffic.

Motocrotte vehicles became a subject of derision among Parisians, who sometimes held their noses in mocking and yelled insults as the décrotteurs rode past. Patrollers continued to issue citations rarely, with a sanitation department leader saying, "Fines have never been our first line of defense".

== Growth in sanitation service ==
In 1990, the city of Paris sent a plea to dog food manufacturers to change their formulas to make turds more firm.

The Paris environmental services department grew into a massive operation with 6000 employees, typically dressed in bright green uniforms. The department cost the city 330 million Euros each year (as of 1996). Streets were swept daily, washed at least once a week, with gutters washed daily using water and street sweepers. Garbage was collected seven days a week (more than in European cities), and Motocrottes regularly vacuumed feces-covered walkways. Yet the turd problem persisted, attributed by one sanitation department staffer to the deep French psyche, saying "when something is forbidden, people want to do it even more."

In the streets, the fecal situation remained very serious, "venturing out for a walk after dark in residential quarters of Paris is more like stepping into a minefield". A Paris man who regularly asked miscreant dog owners to clean their dog's poop from the sidewalk, reported that owners "often react violently". On a poop-laden street, several neighbors organized a demonstration against dog poop behaviors, and adopted a bizarre reaction to owners caught leaving poop: a "humorous" act of droppning piles of spaghetti on the poop piles.

Street sanitation issues intensified in late 1995, when a series of bombings — including a trash can explosion that injured 17 near the Arc de Triomphe — caused the city to lock its 18,771 trash cans. Citizens piled trash on top of closed receptacles, dropped it in the street, or threw it into the Paris Métro. Even with extra street sweeper and trash staff, the city failed to keep up with “wind-blown garbage”. The trash cans returned in April 1996, and mayor Jean Tiberi announced the number of trash cans would increase to 30,000 .

The French "think nothing of leaving dog poop on every corner but hire an army of 5500 street sweepers in bright green uniforms to sweep debris into the sewers at night," wrote Jay McCormick in USA Today. The awareness and education campaigns had failed to improve the situation.

== Increased dog poop patrolling ==
After two decades of dog toilets, sanitation campaigns, motocrotte servicing, and the like, local dog owners had largely refused to perform responsible feces habits. "They showed few signs of self-governing or responsible behaviour", according to a Social History of Medicine article, which calls the dog excrement a "source of social tensions" and "an affront to modern sensibilities" as well as a public hygiene danger.

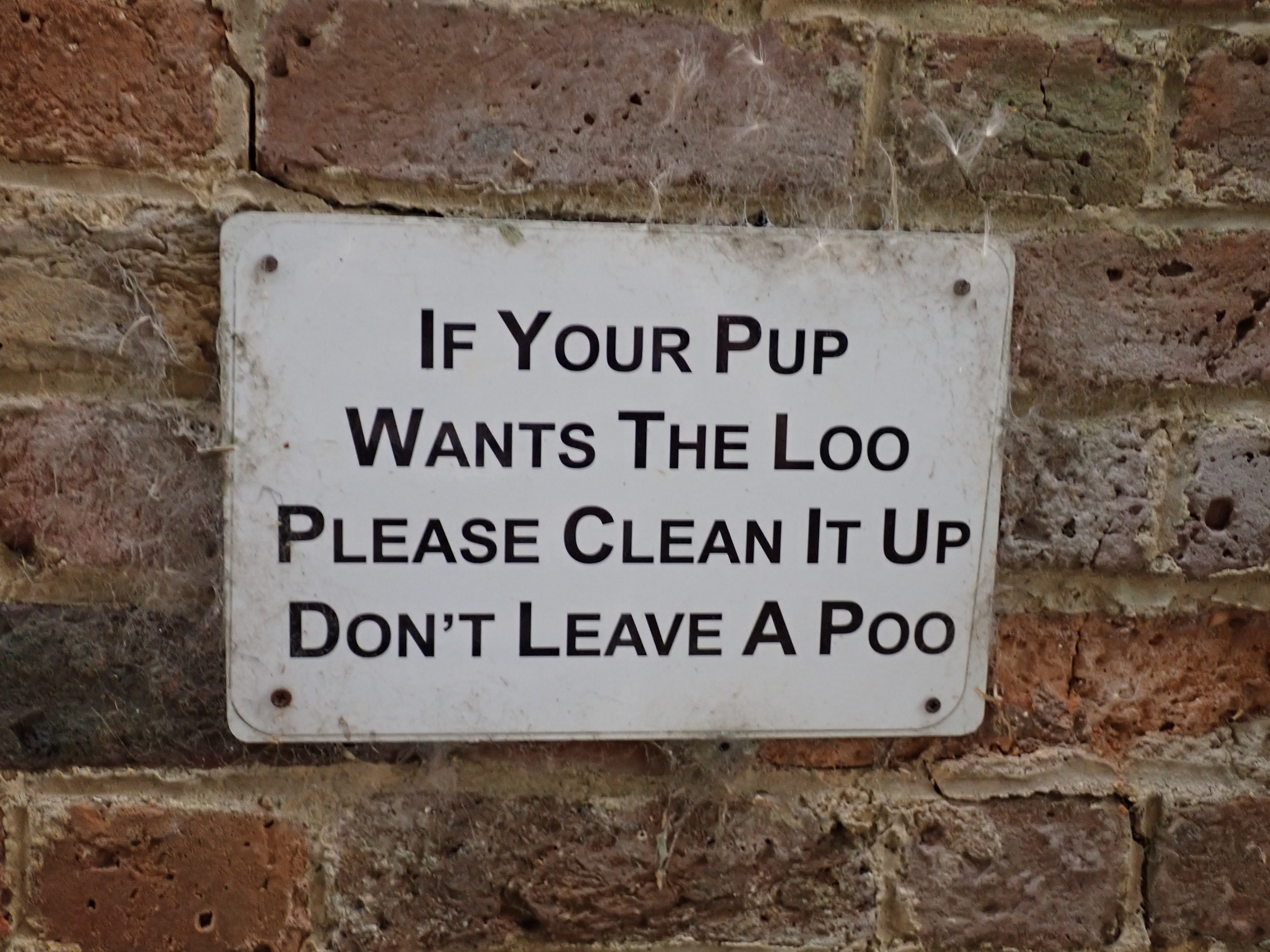
Just because public signage prohibits dog waste does not mean that dogs and owners actually obey it.

In the late 1990s, repressive and coercive measures were implemented. For the first time, dog owners were required to pick up their pet's feces, shouldering some of the responsibility for keeping streets free of fecal matter along with street sweepers. Ramassage (collecting) began gently with an educational and public relations campaign. When the administration of Jean Tiberi, Chirac's successor revamped dog toilets with the introduction of the sani-can in 1998, and providing bags and cans in which owners could collect turds. Tiberi introduced dog-keeping courses alongside the by now obligatory publicity campaign.

In 1999, Mayor Tiberi launched an unprecedentedly aggressive campaign in response to 94% of Parisians ranking dog poop as the most infuriating issue in sanitation, as well as the financial burden of spending 60 million francs on dog poop. Ad firm Leo Burnett worked with the city to create a poster, which was displayed on 2000 boards across Paris, as well as a sobering commercial, both depicting vulnerable Parisians, such as a blind man with a cane and a young child playing outside, smeared with poop, with the sarcastic message: "You're quite right to not pick them up. He will happily do it for you." Tiberi debuted the ad at a "solemn" press event. This was the first of Paris's dog poop publicity campaigns to actually depict dog poop. It employed shock tactics and shaming, and shifted street sanitation from collective to individual responsibility.

In 2001, a 30-year-old artist called Cho circled about 2000 poop piles with sidewalk chalk and marked them with flags, initially the Flag of France to mock the way French people had national pride in their unsanitary street turd tradition. "I am protesting the plague of poop on our streets", he said. Since starting the project, Cho got called "Mr. Turd", and faced intense backlash from dog owners who made threatening calls to his workplace, defending their right to "leave crap anywhere". "maybe they're lobotomized" said Cho, who was nicknamed "Mr. Turd".

== Discontinuation and later developments ==
Socialist mayor Bertrand Delanoë held office of mayor from 2001 to 2014, and tasked deputy mayor for the environment Yves Contassot, with enacting a staunchly anti-excrement agenda. Contassot was frustrated with the previous leaders' inaction, which he blamed on far-fetched re-election worries, saying, "For a long time, it was said in France that a dog owner was a voter. But I think that if we have a little courage, we might find that voters like clean streets." City Hall received more letters complaining about dog poop than other city issues, such as crime.

The Paris town hall decided the Motocrotte fleet was inefficient and possibly counterproductive. In 2001, a report showed that Motocrotte vehicles only picked up 20% of Paris's 16 ton of feces. Operating the fleet cost $5 million per year, occupying half of the city's allotted budget for street dog poop removal.

The Motocrotte program was abandoned in 2002, for a new and better enforced local law which now fines dog owners up to 500 euros for not removing their dog feces, and outlawing dog poop in the gutter. It was estimated at the time of their removal that the remaining fleet of 70 Motocrotte vehicles were cleaning up only 20% of dog feces on Parisian streets, for an annual cost of £3million. Use continued in other French cities including Montpellier as of 2016. The city intensely policed violators by enlisting the city's 2000 parking ticket patrollers for the extra task, a large increase from the 70-person squad that had previously policed dog poop. "Our aim is to have not a single turd on the streets of Paris by March 2002," said Yves Contassot, deputy mayor for the environment. Contassot deliberately designed the system to prevent government workers from pardoning tickets for their friends, which was happening to about 30% of parking tickets.

In 2002, the Motocrotte storage garage burned in a fire, and destroyed half of the 100 scooters. In 2003, the new Socialist administration increased the fine value issued. Penalties now started at 183 euros for first time offenders and 450 for repeat offenders. This was enforced scrupulously by police, who issued 4000 fines in 2002.

In 2009, Contassot said that Paris was no longer the "capital of dog mess", though problems continued in neighborhoods with a dense poodle population, namely the 7th arrondissement and 14th arrondissement.

== Legacy ==
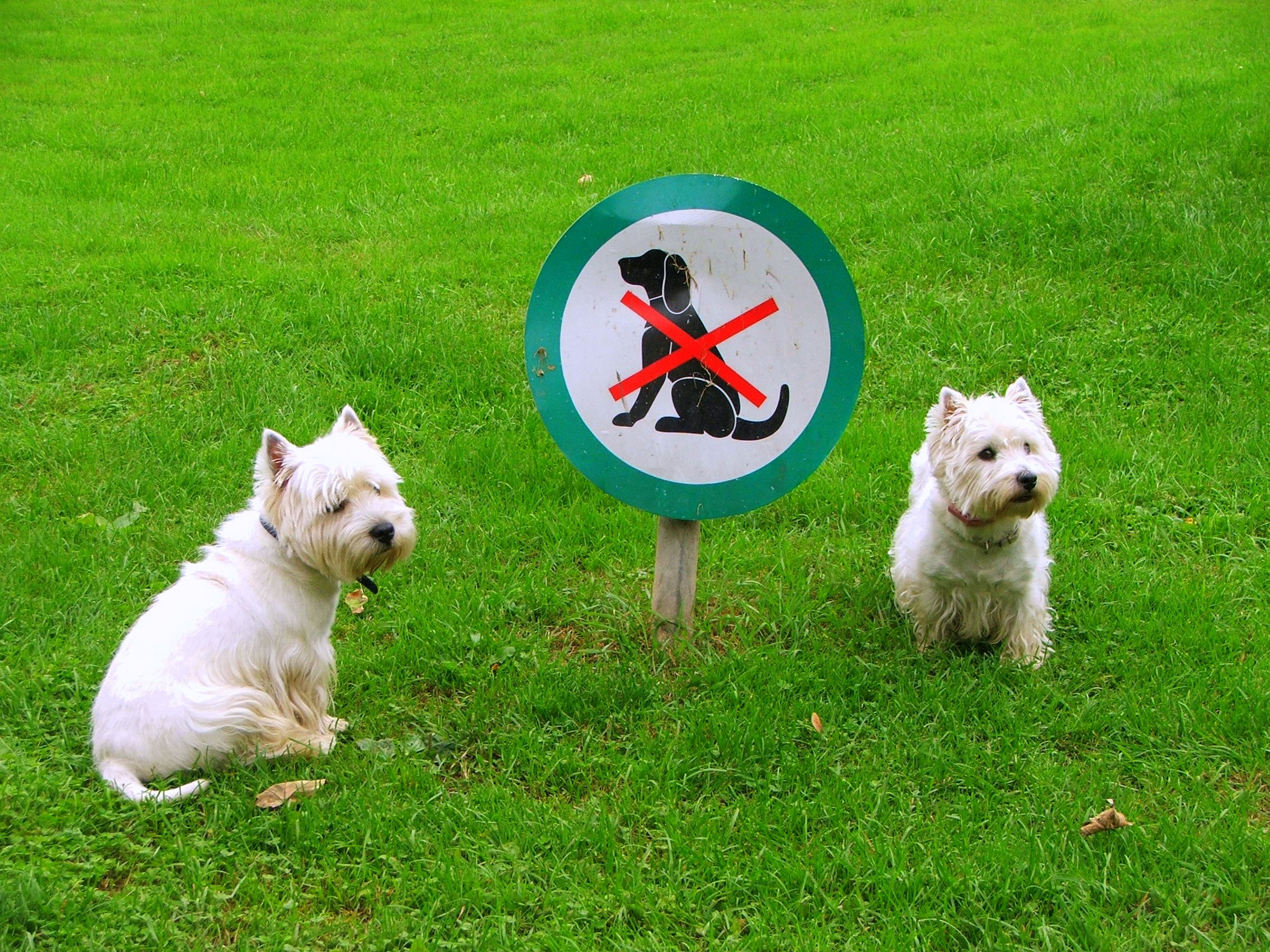
Dogs do not always follow the rules.

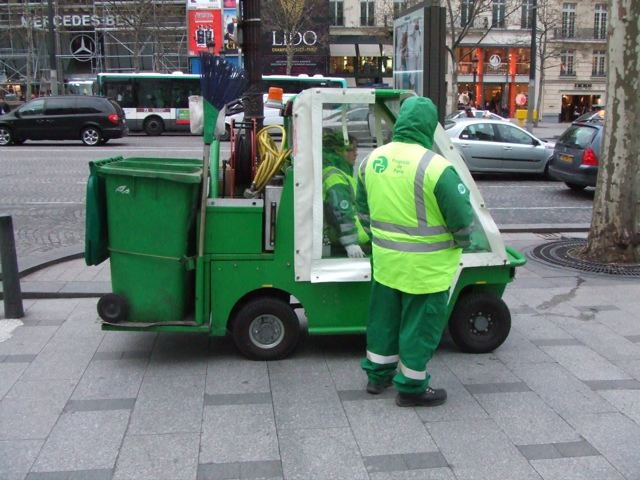
The Motocrotte has not been used since 2002, but Paris uses different bright green waste management vehicles small enough to drive on walking paths.

Motocrotte vehicles were called "one of the most celebrated of Parisian institutions, almost as well-known as the Eiffel Tower of the Arc de Triomphe" in the Irish Independent.

In the Evening Standard, Paris's long struggle to improve its excrement problem was called "a quintessentially French struggle between two quintessentially French values, liberté and fraternité." A leading citizen anti-excrement activist called Midol blamed the city for legitimising the behavior with its regular cleaning, enabling such sloppiness in citizens, calling it a "paradigm for the ills of France". "[The] French tend to have a teenager view of the state: they strenuously assert a right to personal freedom, but believe that it is someone else's duty to clean up after them," commented Midol.

Japanese used the excrement problem as an argument against Paris's bid for the 2008 Olympics.

In 2004, an episode of Sex and the City that was set in Paris featured protagonist Carrie Bradshaw dirtying her stilettos while walking on the Champs-Elysées.

== See also ==
- Pooper-scooper
