= Dog Land (app) =

Dog themed social app

Dog Land is an app currently for iPhone only which allows users to upload photos, add filters and effects, and share with other users. Users may also directly message users in their area or around the world. The Dog Land app also serves as a resource for finding dog-friendly places like dog parks, cafes, shops, and services and hotels. The app is one of the largest mobile communities for dog owners.
