= Dog beach =

Public beach area designated for dogs

Dog Beach Area, Brohard Paw Park in Venice, Florida (2012)

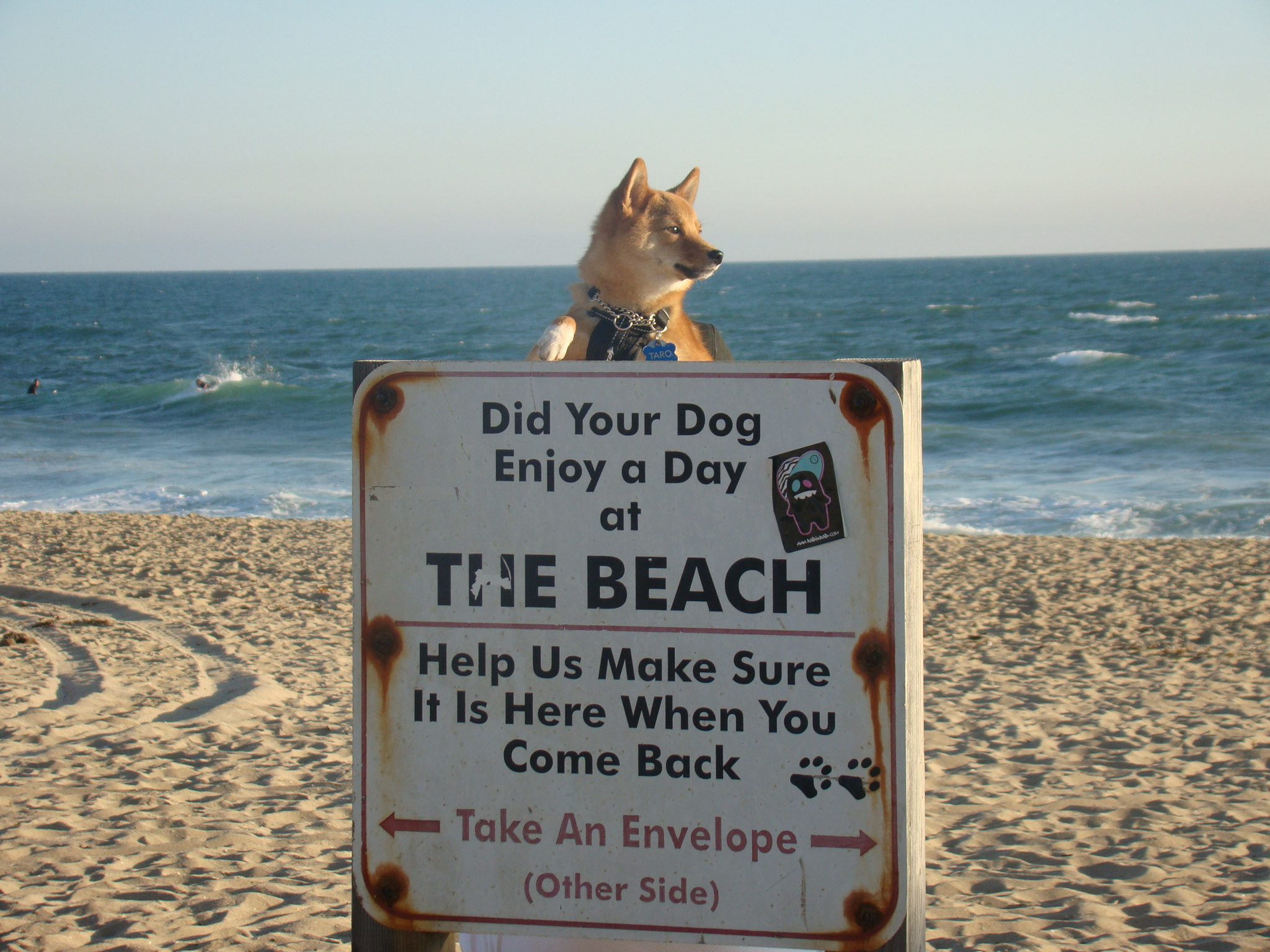
A Shiba Inu poses atop a sign promoting the dog beach in Huntington Beach, California

A dog beach is a public beach area designated as a dog park. The spaces allow dogs to swim recreationally as well as play off-leash with their human companions and other dogs. Many are true beaches located along the coasts of major bodies of water, while some, such as the dog beach at Prospect Park Lake in Brooklyn, are simply ponds, reservoirs, or inland lakes designated for dogs.

Despite being maintained by municipalities and public organizations, some beaches require a fee for access, while some charge specifically for nearby parking. Others are free entirely. Some dog beaches constitute fenced-off portions of larger public beaches.

Some beaches, despite allowing the presence of leashed dogs, will assess fines if dogs are discovered off-leash; these are generally not designated as dog beaches.

== Issues ==
Dog beaches can face threats from a lack of political support, and challenges such as funding availability and maintenance can lead to their closure. Some may also suffer from an unwillingness to invest in improvements such as accessible infrastructure.

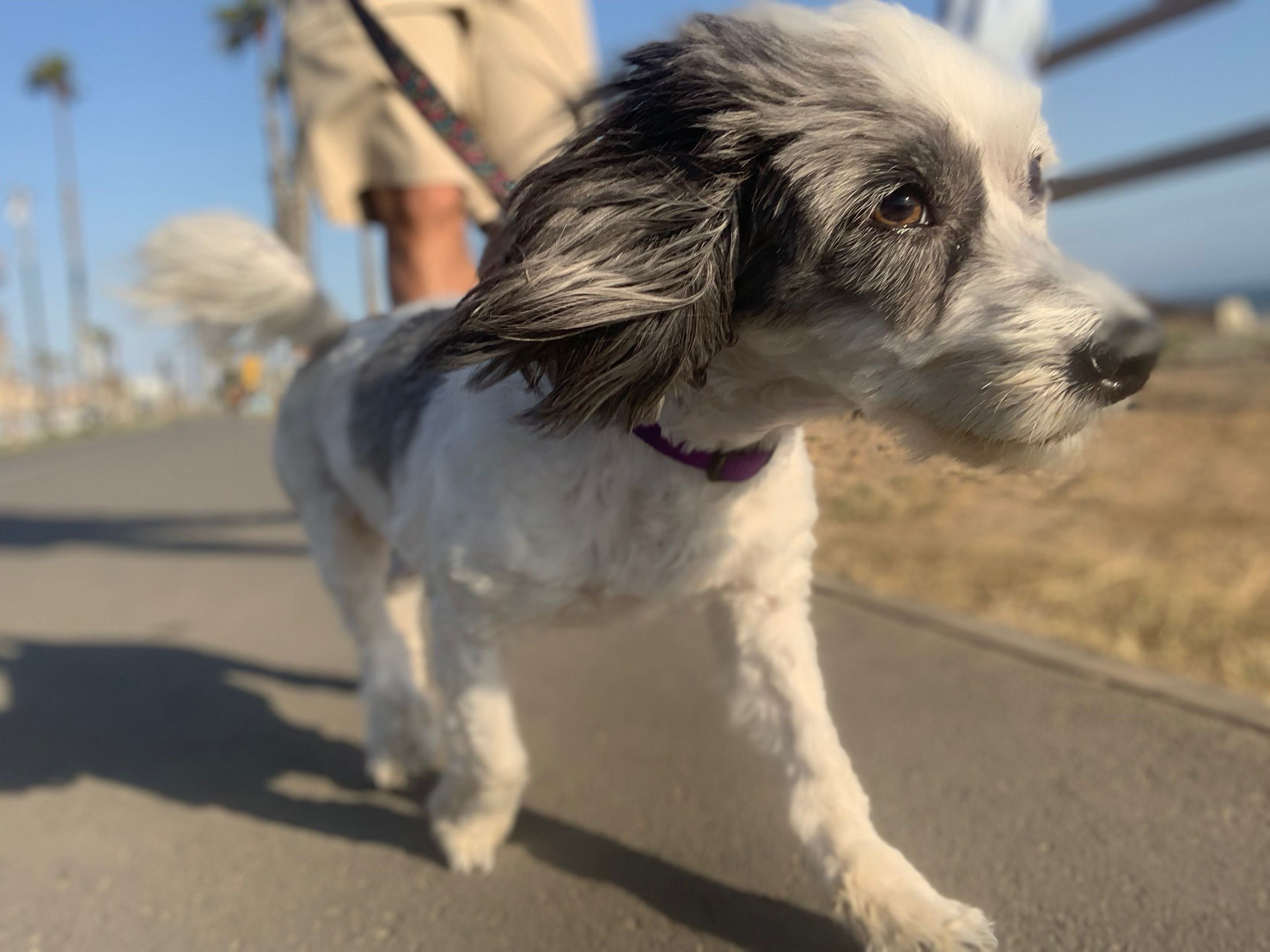
Dog walking at a dog beach in Long Beach, California

Some dog beaches can expose dogs to harmful bacteria from the presence of feces and other contaminants in the water, particularly in small inland bodies of water. A study of dog beaches in Monterey County, California, found that dogs contributed significant levels of fecal contamination in the water.

Conservationists sometimes oppose the presence of dogs on beaches due to their potential to threaten wildlife species, including vulnerable nesting birds. Some ecologists believe dogs disrupt marine ecosystems in indirect ways, such as by dispersing scavengers.

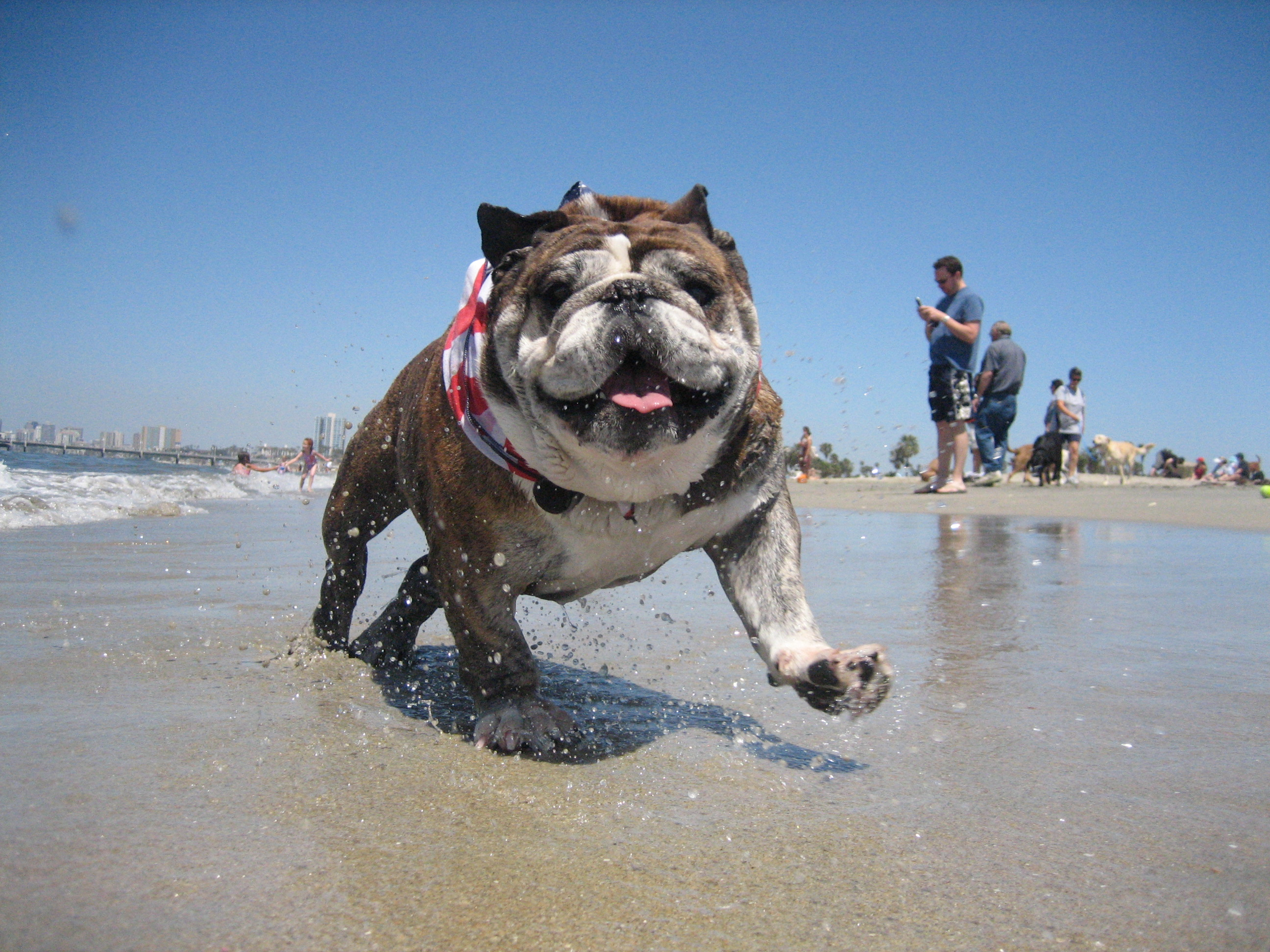
Rosie, the namesake of Rosie's Dog Beach, plays at Rosie's Dog Beach in Long Beach, California

The value of coastline can make it difficult to secure the space necessary to host a dog beach; for instance, Los Angeles County, California, the United States' most populous county, only offers one dog beach.

== Amenities ==
Rosie's Dog Beach, a popular park in Long Beach, California, features a nearby concession stand named Monty's Dog Beach, which serves refreshments for dogs and humans as well as a dog agility course.

== See also ==
- Dog surfing
