= Curb your dog =

New York idiosyncrasy

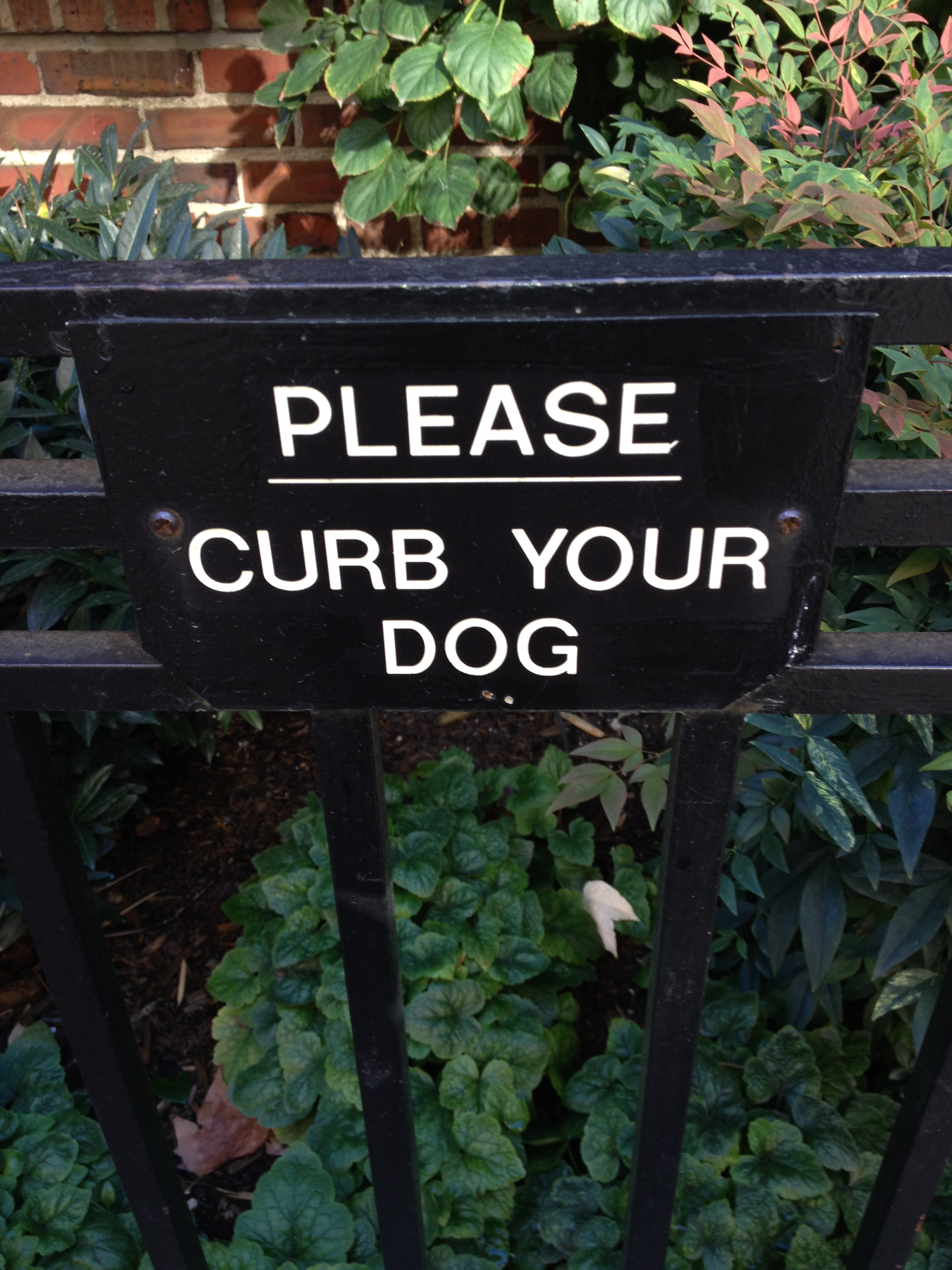
Curb your dog sign, Gramercy Park, 2013

In New York City from the 1930s to 1978, before citywide pooper-scooper laws were enacted, street signs were put in place encouraging citizens to "curb" their dogs - defecate in the edge of the street, near the curb and in "the gutter", rather than on the sidewalk.

The first known "curb your dog" signs in New York City, twenty five in number, were distributed in 1937 "at points around the city" "in an effort to train owners."

In the 1970s, a curb your dog sign campaign was launched in response to a problem that was becoming intolerable. Signs were erected to educate residents that it was required for them to have their dogs defecate in the street gutter, as opposed to the sidewalk, with the intent that NYC Sanitation Department street sweeping machines would clean the streets on an overnight basis. This expensive approach to managing dog waste coincided with an NYC livability, demographic, and financial crisis and proved to be economically untenable.

The signs were of a civic nature being informational and educational. They did not list fines, cite law, or express consequences. In New York City beginning in 1955, education regarding sanitation (including signage and campaigns) was seen as a cost effective way to manage a public quality of life and health concerns known as "street pollution."

"Curb Your Dog" signs from the late 1960's to 1970's were often simple in presentation, with a white border and white lettering stating "Curb your dog - Keep New York Clean" against a black background. An analog sign stated "leash, gutter and clean up after your dog Please."

The legacy of "curb your dog" signage remains in generational memory to such an extent that subsequent statutory laws have been confused/conflated with the educational signage campaign that ended in the late 1970's. A quotation or misquotation ascribed to Sanitation Commissioner Jessica Tisch in April 2022 stated that, "Those who don't pick up their pup's poop will be hit with up to a $250 fine under the city's "Curb Your Dog" law, which was passed back in 1978." The statement erroneously confused the "Curb Your Dog" educational campaign with pooper-scooper laws and signage enacted during the later Koch administration that threatened and imposed fines for failing to pick up after your dog.

== Kacik designs ==
Walter Kacik, an industrial designer, made the graphics on "Curb York Dog" signs, garbage trucks, and "Keep New York City Clean" signs for the New York City Department of Sanitation during the John Lindsay administration in the late 1960's. The modern industrial design of the signs reduced visual pollution within the city with an aim to improve quality of life through education and advertising.

The use of Helvetica within "Curb Your Dog" signs was a prominent feature of Kacik's esthetic. Helvetica was popular from 1968 into the 1970's and thus was widely used by mass-transit systems, retailers (Bloomingdale's), in advertising, and in signage.

Once ubiquitous, the iconic "Kacik" "Curb your dog" signs were highly collectable when introduced (and often stolen) and remain collectable to this day with few remaining.
