= Walter Kacik =

American graphic designer

Walter Kacik (1931 – March 21, 2013) was a designer known for his work on the Department of Sanitation's branding as well as the Curb Your Dog signs introduced in the 1960s in New York City.

After graduating with his BFA from Yale in 1953 and prior to launching his own eponymous firm, Kacik worked for I.M. Pei from 1956 to 1962. Among his high-profile clients at his own firm was the Lindsay Administration's Sanitation Commissioner, Samuel Kearing Jr., who hired Kacik to redesign the department's logo and trucks as well as the Keep New York Clean sign. The design, which was introduced between 1966 and 1968, remains in use as of 2022 and was part of a broader redesign of signage in New York City.
