= Temima Gezari =

American Jewish artist

Temima Gezari (December 21, 1905 – March 5, 2009) was an American artist and art educator. Her life's work in painting and sculpture is presented in the photographic retrospective The Art of Temima Gezari, edited by her son, Daniel Gezari.

== Early life ==
Temima was born Fruma Nimtzowitz on December 21, 1905 in Pinsk, Russia to Yisroel Nimtzowitz and Bella (nee Cohen). She came to the United States as an infant with her family. She grew up in Brownsville, Brooklyn with her parents, sister Etta, and brother Ruby. The family lived in the back of her father's hardware store on Pitkin Avenue in Brownsville.

She graduated from Brooklyn Girls High School in 1921 and the Teacher's Institute of the Jewish Theological Seminary of America in 1925. She also studied at Master Institute of United Arts. She went on to study art at the Parsons New York School of Fine and Applied Arts with Emil Bisttram and Howard Giles (1923–1927), and the Art Students League of New York. In 1933, Diego Rivera befriended and mentored her while he was painting his mural at Rockefeller Center. She also studied at Columbia University, the New School for Social Research, and Hunter College. In 1995 she received an honorary doctorate of letters from the Jewish Theological Seminary of America.

In the early 1930s, when few unmarried women traveled alone to pursue their dreams, Temima drove across country in a Model A Ford, spending summers painting in Taos, New Mexico and in Mexico. She traveled alone to Paris, Egypt, and eventually Palestine, where she painted and taught art at kibbutz Mishmar HaEmek. There she met Zvi Gezari, an early member of the kibbutz movement Hashomer Hatzair. They married in Tel Aviv in 1938, and then she and Zvi moved back to New York City.

== Career ==
Professor Mordecai Kaplan, founder of Reconstructionist Judaism, had a great influence on her professional life. In 1935, as Dean of the Teachers Institute of the Jewish Theological Seminary, he appointed her to the faculty, where she taught art education and art history over the next forty-two years.

In 1940, Dr. Alexander Dushkin, director of the newly formed Jewish Education Committee, asked her to be the Director of the Department of Art Education of what is now the Board of Jewish Education of Greater New York, a position she held for 63 years, retiring in 2003 at the age of 98.

In 1995, Gezari was awarded an honorary Doctor of Letters degree by the Jewish Theological Seminary of New York.

Zvi and Temima built a house and sculpture studio in Rocky Point, New York. Zvi pursued a successful career as an industrial engineer; he was also an amateur astronomer who, in 1953, built a telescope for Albert Einstein. This telescope was the first one that Einstein had looked through. They raised two sons, Daniel (now a NASA astrophysicist) and Walter (a businessman, entrepreneur and industry leader in marine manufacturing).

Well into her 90s, Temima was a fierce advocate for the role of art in child development and for the innate creative spirit of the child. During her long career, she lectured on art and education all over the U.S. and around the world. Temima was a humanist. She discovered, and actively promoted, an important approach to the development of full human potential: recognizing children's innate creativity and encouraging them to express it. Her book Footprints and New Worlds (Reconstructionist Press 1957) presents her philosophy of child development through her experiences in art with children and adults. Temima Gezari dedicated her life to helping others find their creative self: to recognize in her art, and in ourselves, the creative capacity of the human being.

She died peacefully at her home and studio in Rocky Point at age 103.

== Books by Temima Gezari ==
The following books are published by Studio Workshop Press, 66 Noah's Path, Rocky Point, NY 11778:

Retrospective collection of her work:

- The Art of Temima Gezari ISBN 0-9616269-0-9

Philosophy of Art Education:

- Now That I’m Ninety-Five ISBN 0-9616269-1-7
- Art and Education ISBN 0-9616269-2-5
- Footprints and New Worlds (see below)

Autobiographical 5 Book Series:

- Mama, Papa and Me ISBN 0-9616269-4-1
- Never a Dull Moment ISBN 0-9616269-7-6
- Is There a Tomorrow? Yes! ISBN 0-9616269-5-X
- This is the House that Zvi Built ISBN 0-9616269-6-8
- I Remember ISBN 0-9616269-3-3

The following out of print books may also be obtained through Studio Workshop Press:

- The Jewish Kindergarten by Deborah Pessin and Temima Gezari, Union of American Hebrew Congregations (1944)
- Dovidl by H. A. Friedland, Illustrated by Temima Gezari, National Council for Jewish Education (1944)
- Hillel’s Happy Holidays by Mamie Gamoran, Illustrated by Temima Gezari, Union of American Hebrew Congregations (1939)
- Footprints and New Worlds by Temima Gezari, Reconstructionist Press (1957)
