= Margaret Ayer =

American author and illustrator

- Born: June 29, 1894; New York City
- Died: April 24, 1981 (aged 86); Castro Valley, California
- Education: Philadelphia Museum School of Industrial Arts; Private art instruction in Paris and Rome
- Occupations: Writer; Illustrator
- Organizations: Asia Society; Society of Illustrators; Women's National Book Association; Artists Guild of New York
- Spouse: Alfred Babbington Smith
- Parents: Ira Ayer; Louise Foster Ayer

Margaret Ayer (d. 1981) was an American author and self-illustrator of six books for children. She also illustrated 52 books, including Anna and the King of Siam, written by other authors. In addition, she contributed short stories and articles to children's magazines.

== Early life career ==
Born in New York City to Ira Ayer, a physician, and Louise Foster Ayer, she spent much of her childhood in Mexico and the Philippines, where she traveled with her parents and developed an interest in art. As an adult, she lived in Thailand (formerly known as Siam) from 1916 until 1928 and visited again in 1962–63.

Ayer studied at the Philadelphia Museum School of Industrial Arts and received private art instruction in Paris and Rome. She was a member of the Artists Guild of New York, serving for a time as its vice president. She also held membership in the Asia Society, the Society of Illustrators, and the Women's National Book Association.

Some of Ayers' manuscripts, publications, illustrations, and correspondence related to her interest in art and in Thailand are available to the public in the University of Oregon Libraries archives in Eugene. In addition, a watercolor and pencil study for the book jacket of Surprise at Sampey Place can be found in the archives of the University of Minnesota Libraries in Minneapolis.

== Personal life ==
Ayer married Alfred Babbington Smith, a banker. She died in Castro Valley, California, in 1981.

== Bibliography ==
=== Author and illustrator ===
- Magic Window (1933)
- The Elves Service Station (1951)
- The Wish That Went Wild (1952)
- Getting to Know Thailand (1959); revised edition (1972)
- Made in Thailand (1964)
- Animals of Southeast Asia (1970)

=== Illustrator ===
- The Young Revolutionist, Pearl S Buck (1932)
- Lin Foo and Lin Ching: A Boy and Girl of China, Phyllis A. Sowers (1932)
- Nam and Deng a Boy and Girl of Siam, Phyllis A Sowers (1933)
- Totaram, Irene Mott Bose (1933)
- YasuBo and Ishiko a Boy and Girl of Japan, Phyllis A Sowers (1934)
- Let's Go 'Round the World with Bob and Betty, Phyllis A Sowers (1934)
- The Wind Blows West, Christine W Parmenter (1934)
- The Lotus Mark, Phyllis A Sowers (1935)
- The Whistling Snake, Elizabeth Morse (1935)
- Carlos and Lola A Boy and Girl of the Philippines, Phyllis A Sowers (1935)
- My Little Corinthian Cousin, Phyllis A Sowers (1937)
- Under the Japanese Moon, Phyllis A. Sowers (1937)
- Dahn of the Pearl Country, Phyllis A Sowers (1939)
- Nature Was First, Walter C. Fabell (1939)
- Pagoda Anchorage: A Story of the Tea Clipper Days in China, Mary B. Hollister (1939)
- Far Round the World, Grace W. McGavran (1939)
- Story Way, Julia L. Hahn, editor (1940)
- Ann of Ava, Ethel Daniels Hubbard (1941)
- Luck of a Sailor, Charles Coppock (1942)
- Sons of the Dragon, Phyllis A. Sowers (1942)
- New Town in Texas, Siddie J. Johnson (1942)
- Rainbow Stories, Dorothy Christian and R. C. Wheeler (1943)
- Dragons on Guard, Anna C. Chandler (1944)
- Anna and the King of Siam, Margaret Landon (1944)
- The Secret Spring, Emma Atkins Jacobs (1944)
- Girl without a Country, Martha L. Poston (1944)
- Swords and Sails in the Philippines, Phyllis A. Sowers (1944)
- Little Boat Boy: A Story of Kashmir, Jean Bothwell (1945)
- Around the World Stories, Dorothy Christian and R. C. Wheeler (1945)
- Sylvia Sings of Apples, Martha Gwinn Kiser (1945)
- Brave & Glad, Rachel S Sutton ED (1946)
- Scotch Town Tale, Betty Elise Davis (1946)
- River Boy of Kashmir, Jean Bothwell (1946)
- Underground Retreat, Maribelle Cormack and P. L. Bytovetzski (1946)
- Thirteenth Stone: A Story of Rajputana, Jean Bothwell (1946)
- Secret of the Old Sampey Place, Frances F. Wright (1946)
- Brave and Glad, Rachel S Sutton Ed (1946)
- Adventure in Palestine: The Search for Aleizah, Judith Ish-Kishor (1947)
- Star of India, Jean Bothwell (1947)
- Anna and the King, Margaret Landon (1947)
- Fig Tree Village, Grace W. McGavran (1947)
- Juan of Manila, Marie McSwigan (1947)
- Scarlet Bird, Ethel T. Anderson (1948)
- Empty Tower, Jean Bothwell (1948)
- Number Eleven Poplar Street, Frances F. Wright (1948)
- Let's Go to Nazareth, Elizabeth L. Reed (1948)
- Star Shone, Robbie Trent (1948)
- Elephant Boy of the Teak Forest, Phyllis A. Sowers (1949)
- Little Flute Player, Jean Bothwell (1949)
- Fawn and the White Mountain Press, Genevieve Cross (1949)
- Favorite Old Fairy Tales, Muriel Fuller, editor (1949)
- Rainbow Campus, Ethel T. Anderson (1950)
- Onions without Tears, Jean Bothwell (1950)
- Peter Holt, Jean Bothwell (1950)
- Lost Kingdom, Chester Bryant (1951)
- Paddy and Sam, Jean Bothwell (1952)
- A Candle for your Cake, Carolyn Sherwin Bailey (1952)
- Stephen Foster: His Life, Catherine O. Peare (1952)
- Poplar Street Park, Frances F. Wright (1952)
- John James Audubon, Catherine O Peare (1953)
- Golden Letter to Siam, Jean Bothwell and Phyllis A. Sowers (1953)
- Borrowed Monkey, Jean Bothwell (1953)
- Henry Wadsworth Longfellow: His Life, Catherine O. Peare (1953)
- Red Barn Club, Jean Bothwell (1954)
- Mark Twain: His Life, Catherine O. Peare (1954)
- Gilbert and Sullivan Song Book, Malcolm Hyatt and W. Fabell (1955)
- Cal's Birthday Present, Jean Bothwell (1955)
- Ranch of a Thousand Horns, Jean Bothwell and Phyllis A. Sowers (1955)
- Robert Louis Stevenson: His Life, Catherine O. Peare (1955)
- Jules Verne: His Life, Catherine O. Peare (1956)
- The Golden Coin, Grace W McGavran (1963)
