= Sulamith Ish-Kishor =

American poet

- Born: 1896; London, United Kingdom
- Died: June 23, 1977 (aged 80–81)
- Education: Hunter College

Sulamith Ish-kishor (1896 – June 23, 1977) was an American writer, known for her religious and children's literature.

== Biography ==
She was born in London, England, one of eight children of Ephraim and Fanny Ish-Kishor. Her father was a well-known writer of Jewish children's literature and an early proponent of Hovevei Zion, a pre-Zionist movement, and later of political Zionism. Her older sister, Judith Ish-Kishor, was a pioneering writer of Jewish children's literature in English.

Sulamith began writing at age 5 and had several of her poems printed in British publications by the time she was 10. When Sulamith was 13, her family moved to New York City (like the family in her novel Our Eddie).

At Hunter College, she studied languages and history. She wrote widely, and was published in several magazines, including The New Yorker, Saturday Review, and Reader's Digest. Her now-classic story of a long-distance correspondence and its fateful conclusion, "Appointment with Love," was published in a 1943 edition of Collier's and was subsequently plagiarized by preacher-author Max Lucado (as "The Rose") in a 1992 collection.

Our Eddie was a 1970 Newbery Honor book. It portrays a father whose abusive treatment of his child contrasts with the Jewish values he claims to promote. A Boy of Old Prague, which recounts the friendship between a 16th-century Gentile boy and a Jewish family, was a popular selection of the Scholastic Book Club in the 1970s and dealt with the issue of antisemitism in late Renaissance Europe.

== Works ==
- The Bible Story. The United Synagogue of America. 1921. (reprinted, Nabu Press ISBN 9781276379205)
- The Heaven on the Sea, together with Twenty Poems, New York, Bloch Publishing Co, 1924
- Friday night stories: Series I, New York: The Women's League of the United Synagogue of America (reprinted 1949)
- Friday Night Stories. Series II, New York: The Women's League of the United Synagogue of America, 1928
- The Children's Story of the Bible, a Bible History for School And Home, New York, Educational Stationery House, 1930
- Children's History of Israel (In 3 Volumes Illustrated: Volume One: From Creation to the Passing of Moses. Volume Two: From Joshua to the Second Temple. Volume Three: From the Second Temple to the Present Time), Jordan Publishing Company, 1933
- Magnificent Hadrian: A Biography of Hadrian, Emperor of Rome, New York, Minton, Balch & Company, 1935 (also London, Victor Gollancz, 1935)
- Jews to Remember, Hebrew Publishing Company, 1941
- "Appointment With Love," Collier's, June 5, 1943 (fulltext available)
- American Promise: A History of the Jews in the New World, New York, Behrman House, 1947
- Everyman's history of the Jews, New York, Frederick Fell, 1948
- The Palace of Eagles and Other Stories, New York, The Shoulson Press, 1948
- A Stranger Within Thy Gates, New York, The Shoulson Press, 1948
- Blessed Is the Daughter ISBN 0-88400-064-8 Shengold Publishers, Inc., 1959 reprinted ISBN 9780548442753
- How Theodor Herzl Created the Jewish National Fund Together with an album of Herzliana, a chronology and excerpts from his diaries and autobiography, New York, Youth and Education Department, Jewish National Fund, 1960 (reprinted ISBN 9781258188757)
- A Boy of Old Prague, Pantheon Books, 1963
- The Carpet of Solomon: A Hebrew Legend, Pantheon Books, 1966 ISBN 978-0-394-91131-1
- Zalman Shazar: President of the People, New York, Youth and Education Department, Jewish National Fund, 1966
- Pathways Through the Jewish Holidays, Hoboken, New Jersey, KTAV Publishing House, 1967 ISBN 0-87068-537-6
- Our Eddie, Pantheon Books, 1969 ISBN 0-394-81455-X
- Drusilla, a Novel of the Emperor Hadrian, Pantheon Books, 1970 ISBN 3-570-07526-5)
- The Master of Miracle: A New Novel of the Golem, Harper & Row, 1971 ISBN 9780060260880
- Ferrer, the Sweetest Sula, 2006
- Meggie and the Fairies, New York: Works Progress Administration

== Awards ==
- 1964: National Jewish Book Award for A Boy of Old Prague

== See also ==
- Deborah Pessin
