= Alfred Giardino =

American lawyer

Alfred A. Giardino
- Born: 1913
- Died: 1994 (aged 80–81); Brooklyn, New York
- Education: Brooklyn College; Columbia College Law School
- Occupation: Lawyer
- Children: 2

Alfred A. Giardino (1913 – 1994) was a prominent New York lawyer. He was the former President of the New York City Board of Education and chairman of the New York City Board of Higher Education.

== Early life and education ==
Giardino was born in Brooklyn in 1913. He had a sister, Jeanne.

In 1933, Alfred Giardino, Capt. and Murray Seeman were the representatives of the Brooklyn College Varsity Debating Team in a series of debates defeating Rutgers College, Rider College, and Penn State.

The Brooklyn College student council awarded silver keys to Seeman and Giardino. Giardino graduated Brooklyn College in 1934 and received his law degree from Columbia Law School in 1937.

== Career ==
Giardino specialized in employment and labor law. He represented the New York Shipping Association and was chief negotiator between the shipping industry and the International Longshoremen's Association.

He held faculty positions at Brooklyn College, Columbia University, Cornell Universal, and New York University School of Law.

1964, appointed to the Board of Education by Mayor Robert F. Wagner.

1967, elected president of the Board of Education

Giardino opposed decentralization of the schools and did not seek re-election

1974, appointed chairman, Board of Higher Education by Mayor Abraham D. Beame,

1976 resigned in opposition to Governor Hugh Carey's plans to charge tuition fees for students to attend City University.

== Personal life ==
Giardino was married to Lucienne and had two daughters. He lived in Riverdale, the Bronx. Giardino died while attending his 60th class reunion at Brooklyn College.
