= Mutt Mitt =

Plastic glove brand

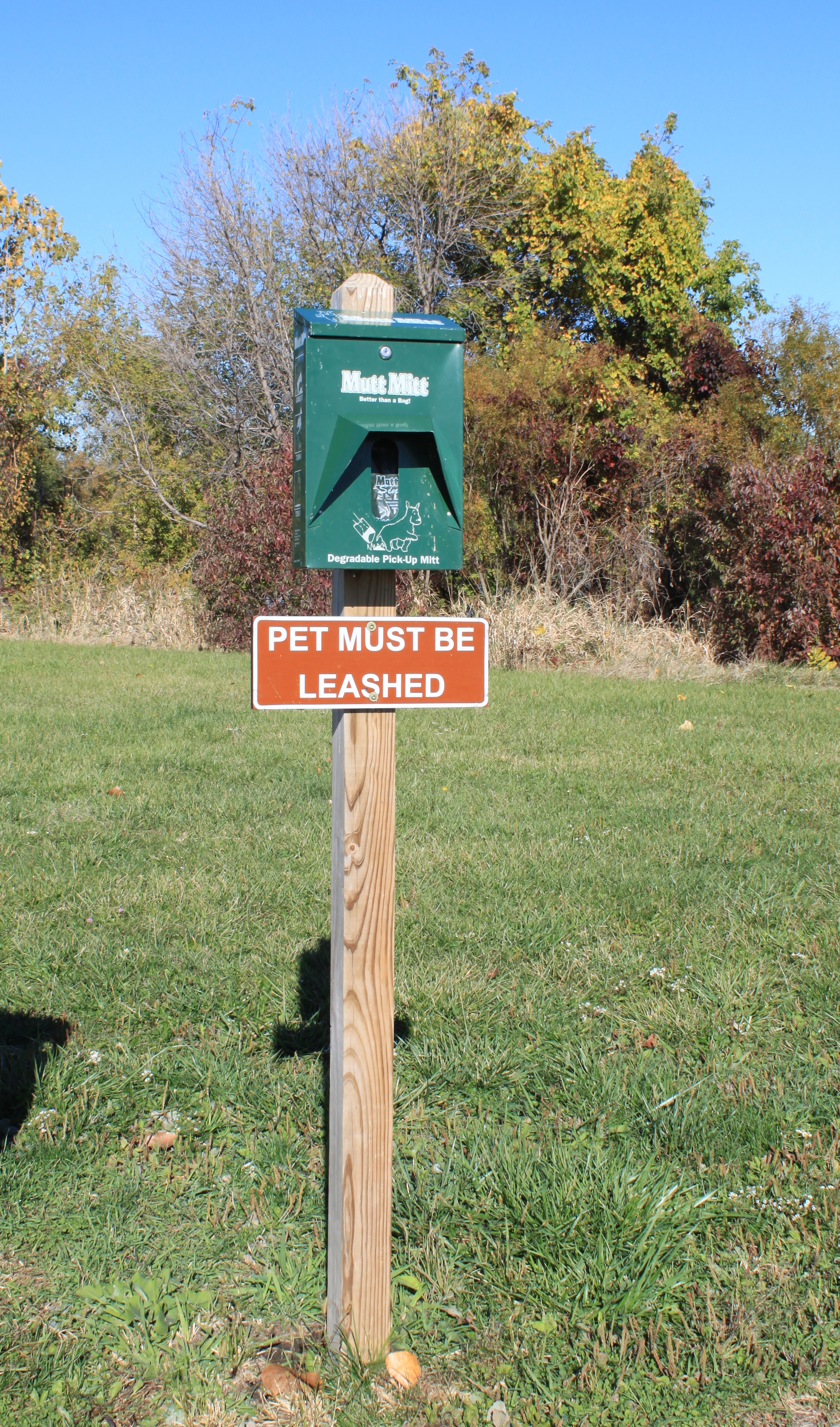
Mutt Mitt dispenser in Sterling State Park, Michigan

Mutt Mitt is a brand of plastic mitts used to pick up waste from pets, especially dogs.

== About ==
Mutt Mitt plastic mitts are two-ply with a bottom pouch, and are constructed so that the user cannot get waste on their hands. They are also puncture-resistant, and leave no mess when the mitt is turned inside out. They are discarded after waste has been picked up.

Mutt Mitts are single-use for non-commercial customers and come in packages of 300 and 500.

== See also ==
- Pooper-scooper, device used to pick up animal feces
