= Pooper-scooper =

Device used to pick up animal feces

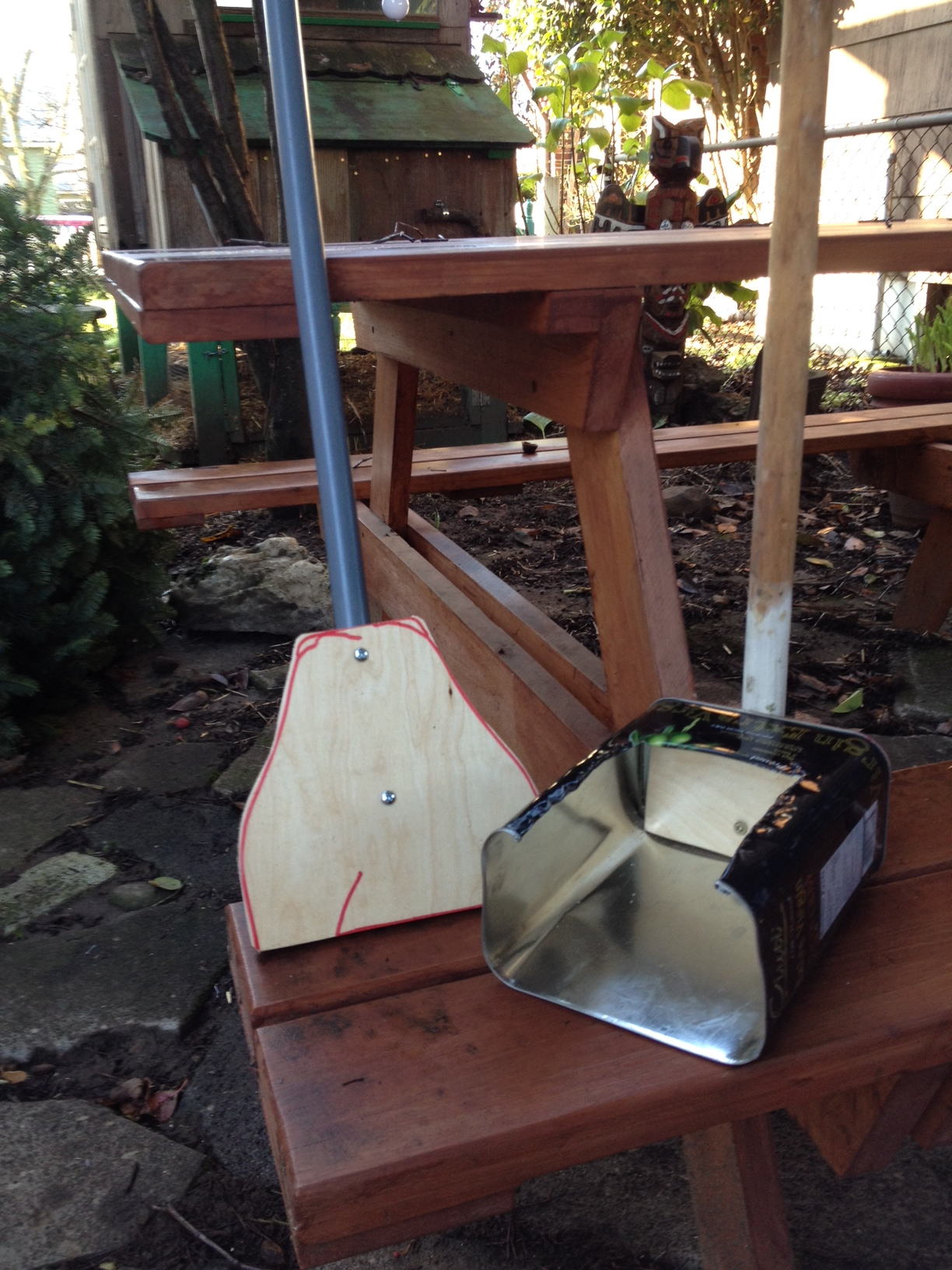
A homemade pooper-scooper in Portland, Oregon, 2012

A pooper-scooper, or poop scoop, is a device used to pick up animal feces from public places and yards, particularly those of dogs. Pooper-scooper devices often have a bag or bag attachment. 'Poop bags' are alternatives to pooper scoopers, and are simply a bag, usually turned inside out, to carry the feces to a proper disposal area. Sometimes, the person performing the cleanup is also known as the pooper-scooper.

== History ==
The invention is credited to Brooke Miller, of Anaheim, California. The design she patented is a metal bin with a rake-like edge attached to a wooden stick. It also includes a rake-like device to scoop the poop into the scooper and a hatch that can be attached to a garbage bag that fits onto the base. The generic term pooper-scooper has been included in dictionaries since the early 1970s.

== Legislation ==
Around 1935, "Curb Your Dog" signs started appearing in NYC, initiating discussions and correspondence with the Department of Sanitation.

The Village of Great Neck Estates was one of the earliest communities to enact a local ordinance, in 1975, requiring residents to remove pollution on private and public property caused by dogs. Murray Seeman, Jay S. Goodman and Howard Zelikow, advocated in the face of heated opposition.

In 1978, New York State passed the Pooper-Scooper Law. It was so controversial that Mayor Koch needed the New York State Legislature to pass it, after being unable to convince the New York City Council. The New York Times called actress and consumer advocate Fran Lee "New York's foremost fighter against dog dirt".

October 20, 1978, KQED San Francisco news footage featured scenes from a Harvey Milk press conference in Duboce Park in which he discussed the city's new "pooper scooper law" with a how-to demonstration.

Marking the 25th anniversary of the Pooper-scooper law, NYC Mayor Ed Koch was quoted saying, "If you’ve ever stepped in dog doo, you know how important it is to enforce the canine waste law. New Yorkers overwhelmingly do their duty and self-enforce. Those who don’t are not fit to call friend."

In 2018, the City of San Francisco allocated budget funds in the amount of $830,977 to address this issue.

A number of jurisdictions, including New York City, San Francisco and Chicago have laws requiring pet owners to clean up after their pets:

a) A person who owns, possesses or controls a dog, cat or other animal shall not permit the animal to commit a nuisance on a sidewalk of any public place, on a floor, wall, stairway or roof of any public or private premises used in common by the public, or on a fence, wall or stairway of a building abutting on a public .

Authorized employees of New York City Departments of Health (including Animal Care & Control), of Sanitation, or of Parks and Recreation can issue tickets.

Such laws are often nicknamed "pooper-scooper laws", though the laws only stipulate that dog owners remove their dogs' feces, not the method or device used (thus using a hand-held plastic bag to remove feces complies with these laws).

Some apartment complexes, condos, and neighborhoods require residents to pick up dog poop and use DNA testing on poop to fine people who did not pick up after their pet.

== Health concerns ==
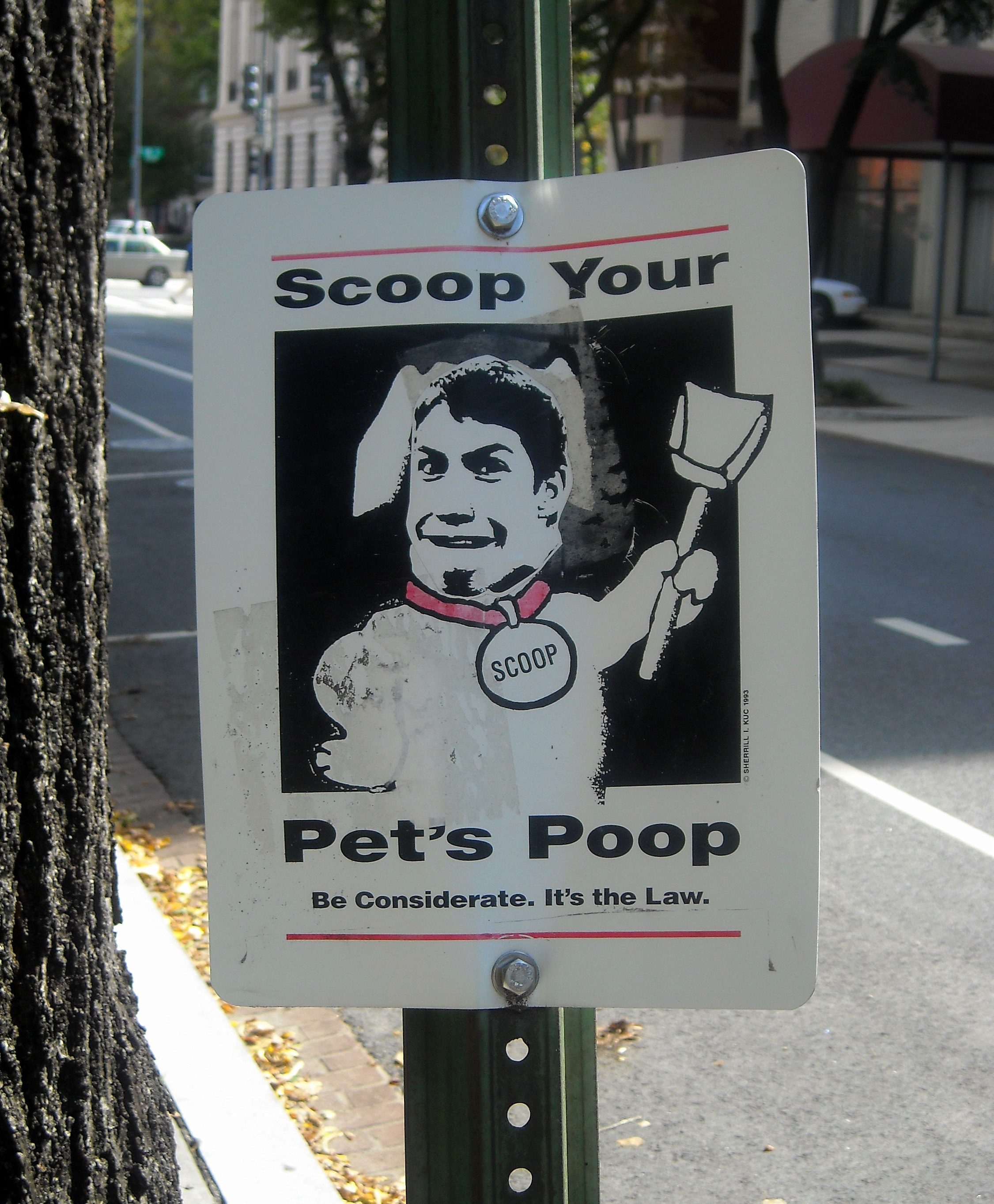
A sign instructing park-goes to be courteous and pick up after their pet with an image of a pooper-scooper.

Dog droppings are one of the leading sources of E. coli (fecal coliforms) bacterial pollution, Toxocara canis and Neospora caninum helminth parasite pollution. One gram of dog feces contains over 20,000,000 E. coli cells. While an individual animal's deposit of feces will not measurably affect the environment, the cumulative effect of thousands of dogs and cats in a metropolitan area can create serious problems due to contamination of soil and water supplies. The runoff from neglected pet waste contaminates water, creating health hazards for people, fish, ducks, etc.

In Germany an estimated 1,400 tonnes (1,500 short tons) of feces are deposited daily on public property. A citizen commission (2005) overwhelmingly recommended a plan that would break even at about seven months. DNA samples would be required when pet licenses come up for renewal. Within a year, a database of some 12,500 registration-required canine residents would be available to sanitation workers with sample-test kits. Evidence would be submitted to a forensics laboratory where technicians could readily match the waste to its dog. The prospect of a prompt fine equivalent to $600 US (at 2005 exchange rate) would help assure preventive compliance, as well as cover costs. In adult dogs, the infection by Toxocara canis is usually asymptomatic but can be fatal in puppies. A number of various vertebrates, including humans, and some invertebrates can become infected by Toxocara canis. Humans are infected, like other paratenic hosts, by ingestion of embryonated T. canis eggs. The disease caused by migrating T. canis larvae (toxocariasis) results in visceralis larva migrans and ocularis larva migrans. Clinically infected people have helminth infection and rarely blindness.

== See also ==
- Motocrotte – motorcycle-based solution for cleaning the streets of Paris
- Mutt Mitt – a plastic mitt used to pick up waste from pets

== Sources ==
- Blackman, Diane (2003-07-14). "Dog Parks, Dog Runs and Off Leash Play". Dog Play.
- "Parks Business Plan". King County Parks and Recreation Division. Department of Natural Resources and Parks. 2004-05-25.
- Kargl, Reinhard (July 2005). "A Pooper Scooper Law with Bite. The Germans consider DNA testing to match poop to pooch". Science. Popular Science.
- "The Scoop on Poop". ROMP. September 2000.
  ROMP (Responsible Owners of Mannerly Pets), metropolitan Twin Cities recreation-advocacy group; June 1996 in Roseville, MN, nonprofit incorporation April 2000 [About ROMP]
- "Scoop the Poop Campaign". BurlingtonEcoInfo > Water > issues > Scoop the Poop. University of Vermont. n.d.
- "Wildlife". NYC Health Code. Animal Care & Control of New York City. Archived from the original on 2012-02-16.
- Zand, Joel R., Esq. "New York City's Dog Poop Scoop Law". Legal issues and laws affecting dogs, companion animals, and their people. Joel R. Zand.
  New York attorney and dog lawyer;
