= Judith Ish-Kishor =

American children's author (1892–1971)

- Born: Rebecca Judith Ish-Kishor; 25 March 1892; Boston, Massachusetts, United States
- Died: 1971 (aged 78–79)
- Education: Hunter College
- Spouse: Herbert Lapides (m. 1949)
- Parent: Ephraim Ish-Kishor
- Relatives: Sulamith Ish-Kishor (sister)
- Writing career
- Language: English
- Genre: Children's literature

Rebecca Judith Ish-Kishor (25 March 1892 – 1971) was an American writer of Jewish children's historical fiction.

She was born in Boston in 1892, the daughter of Zionist leader Ephraim Ish-Kishor. She was raised in London before returning to the U.S. to study at Hunter College in New York. She is best known for her works Adventure in Palestine: The Search for Aleezah (1947), Joel is the Youngest (1954), and Tales From the Wise Men of Israel (1962). She also wrote a popular column for Jewish children in the English-language Jewish press, entitled The Sabbath Angel.

Her sister, Sulamith Ish-Kishor, was also a prominent children's writer.

== Publications ==
- Here and There: A Chamisho Osor Playlet. New York: National Jewish Welfare Board. 1923.
- The Lady of the House: A Story of a Boy and Girl in Jerusalem. New York: Palestine Penny Luncheon Fund Committee. 1926.
- The Slave from Egypt: A Play in One Act. New York: Samuel French. 1930.
- To the Land of the Cornflower. New York: National Young Judaea. 1945. Illustrated by Theresa Sherman.
- Adventure in Palestine: The Search for Aleezah. New York: J. Messner. 1947. Illustrated by Margaret Ayer.
- Joel is the Youngest. New York: J. Messner. 1954. Illustrated by Jules Gotlieb.
- Tales from the Wise Men of Israel. Philadelphia: Lippincott. 1962. Illustrated by W. T. Mars.
