= Howard Simon =

American illustrator, painter, and printmaker (1902–1979)

Howard Simon (1902–1979) was an American illustrator, painter, and printmaker who is known for his woodcuts.

Simon provided illustrations for several dozen books, and his work is displayed in numerous museums.
