= Great Neck Estates, New York =

- Village
- Incorporated Village of Great Neck Estates
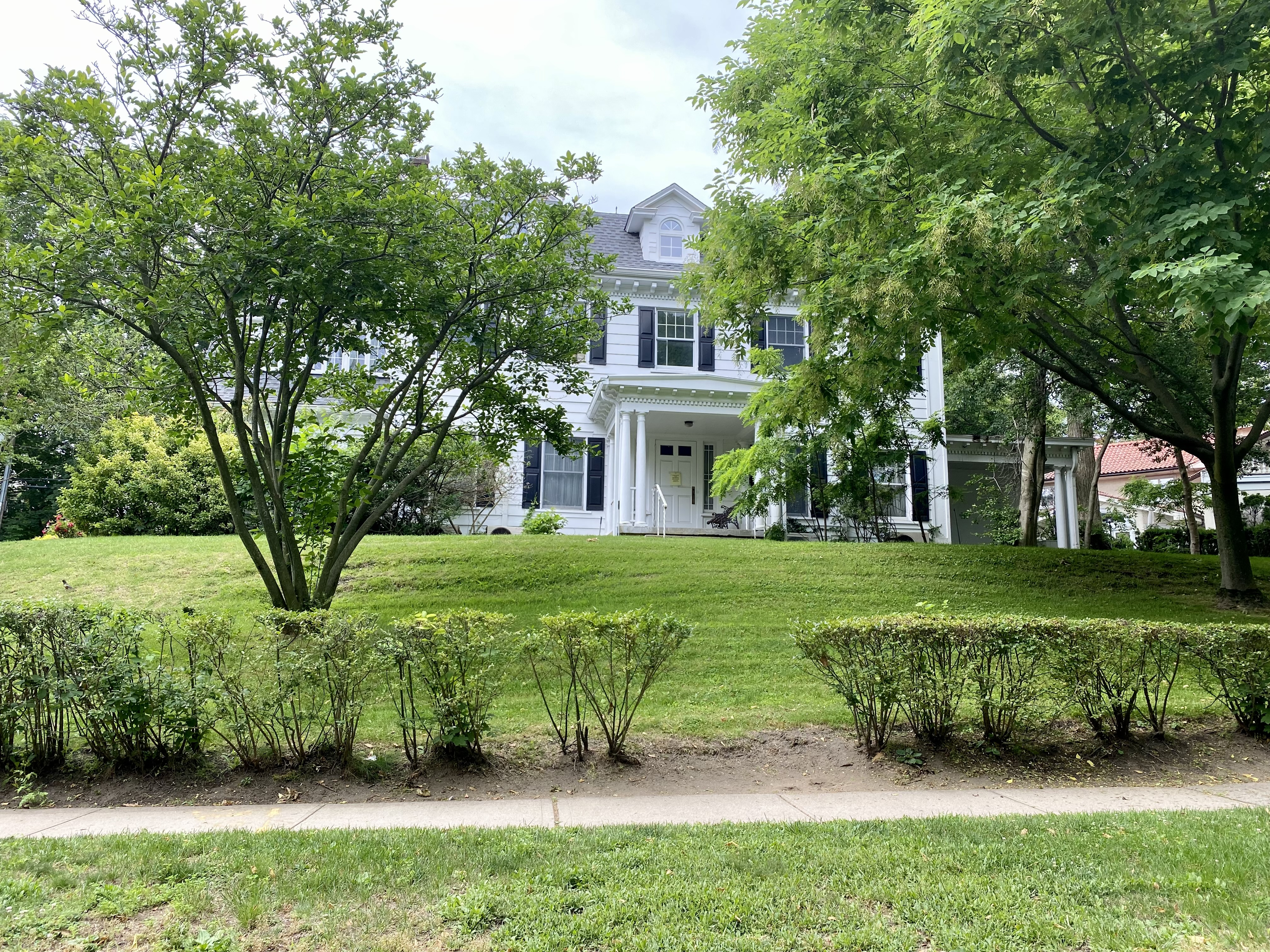
- Great Neck Estates Village Hall in 2021
- Nicknames: The Estates; GNE; VGNE
- Location in Nassau County and the state of New York

- Location on Long Island Location within the state of New York
- Coordinates: 40°47′14″N 73°44′17″W
- Country: United States
- State: New York
- County: Nassau
- Town: North Hempstead
- Incorporated: 1911

Government
  - Mayor: William D. Warner
  - Deputy Mayor: Jeffrey Farkas

Area
  - Total: 0.80 sq mi (2.08 km^{2})
  - Land: 0.76 sq mi (1.98 km^{2})
  - Water: 0.035 sq mi (0.09 km^{2})
- Elevation: 82 ft (25 m)

Population (2020)
  - Total: 2,990
  - Density: 3,903.8/sq mi (1,507.27/km^{2})
- Time zone: UTC−5 (Eastern (EST))
  - Summer (DST): UTC−4 (EDT)
- ZIP Code: 11021 (Great Neck)
- Area codes: 516, 363
- FIPS code: 36-30191
- GNIS feature ID: 0951638
- Website: www.greatneckestates-ny.gov

Great Neck Estates is a village on the Great Neck Peninsula in the Town of North Hempstead, in Nassau County, on the North Shore of Long Island, in New York, United States. The population was 2,990 at the time of the 2020 census.

== History ==
Great Neck Estates incorporated in 1911, making it the second village on the Great Neck Peninsula to incorporate. Residents felt that the incorporation was imperative in order to maintain home rule. They also felt that by incorporating, they would be able to have services which they otherwise would not be able to have through the Town of North Hempstead.

A plaque was installed at Village Hall, the former John Jacob Atwater residence, in 1981 to commemorate the 70th Anniversary of Great Neck Estates' incorporation as a village.

In 1982, Great Neck Estates became the first village on Long Island to call for a nuclear freeze between the United States and the former Soviet Union after trustees approved of a petition started by three concerned residents on the Great Neck Peninsula. Copies of their document were delivered to the leaders of both nations as peace efforts.

== Geography ==
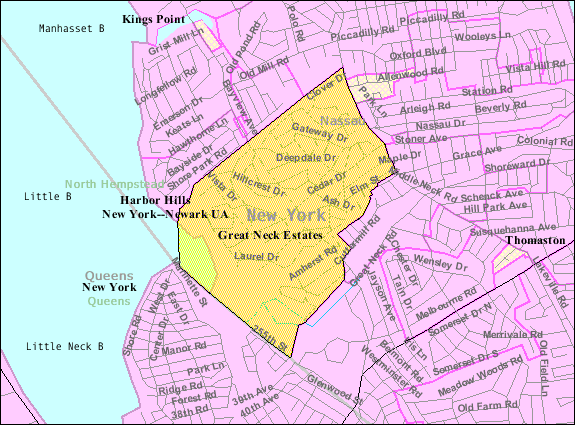
U.S. Census map of Great Neck Estates

According to the United States Census Bureau, the village has a total area of 0.8 square miles (2.1 km^{2}), of which 0.8 square miles (2.1 km^{2}) is land and 0.04 square miles (0.10 km^{2}), or 4.94%, is water.

== Demographics ==
Historical population
| Census | Pop. | Note | %± |
|---|---|---|---|
| 1920 | 339 | | — |
| 1930 | 1,738 | | 412.7% |
| 1940 | 1,969 | | 13.3% |
| 1950 | 2,464 | | 25.1% |
| 1960 | 3,262 | | 32.4% |
| 1970 | 3,131 | | −4.0% |
| 1980 | 2,936 | | −6.2% |
| 1990 | 2,790 | | −5.0% |
| 2000 | 2,756 | | −1.2% |
| 2010 | 2,761 | | 0.2% |
| 2020 | 2,990 | | 8.3% |
U.S. Decennial Census

=== Racial and ethnic composition ===
Great Neck Estates village, New York – Racial and ethnic composition Note: the US Census treats Hispanic/Latino as an ethnic category. This table excludes Latinos from the racial categories and assigns them to a separate category. Hispanics/Latinos may be of any race.
| Race / Ethnicity (NH = Non-Hispanic) | Pop 2000 | Pop 2010 | Pop 2020 | % 2000 | % 2010 | % 2020 |
|---|---|---|---|---|---|---|
| White alone (NH) | 2,495 | 2,336 | 2,159 | 90.53% | 84.61% | 72.21% |
| Black or African American alone (NH) | 23 | 21 | 16 | 0.83% | 0.76% | 0.54% |
| Native American or Alaska Native alone (NH) | 0 | 3 | 2 | 0.00% | 0.11% | 0.07% |
| Asian alone (NH) | 133 | 281 | 563 | 4.83% | 10.18% | 18.83% |
| Native Hawaiian or Pacific Islander alone (NH) | 0 | 0 | 0 | 0.00% | 0.00% | 0.00% |
| Other race alone (NH) | 2 | 3 | 30 | 0.07% | 0.11% | 1.00% |
| Mixed race or Multiracial (NH) | 31 | 37 | 98 | 1.12% | 1.34% | 3.28% |
| Hispanic or Latino (any race) | 72 | 80 | 122 | 2.61% | 2.90% | 4.08% |
| Total | 2,756 | 2,761 | 2,990 | 100.00% | 100.00% | 100.00% |

=== 2020 census ===
As of the 2020 census, Great Neck Estates had a population of 2,990. The median age was 42.0 years. 26.6% of residents were under the age of 18 and 21.5% were 65 years of age or older. For every 100 females, there were 103.0 males, and for every 100 females age 18 and over, there were 96.7 males.

100.0% of residents lived in urban areas, while 0.0% lived in rural areas.

There were 879 households, of which 40.0% had children under the age of 18 living in them. Of all households, 74.1% were married-couple households, 7.3% were households with a male householder and no spouse or partner present, and 17.6% were households with a female householder and no spouse or partner present. About 12.4% of all households were made up of individuals, and 8.9% had someone living alone who was 65 years of age or older.

There were 937 housing units, of which 6.2% were vacant. The homeowner vacancy rate was 2.5%, and the rental vacancy rate was 7.1%.

=== 2000 census ===
At the 2000 census there were 2,756 people, 919 households, and 767 families in the village. The population density was 3,581.3 inhabitants per square mile (1,382.7/km^{2}). There were 944 housing units at an average density of 1,226.7 per square mile (473.6/km^{2}). The racial makeup of the village was 92.71% White, 0.94% African American, 4.83% Asian, 0.33% from other races, and 1.20% from two or more races. Hispanic or Latino of any race were 2.61%.

Of the 919 households 38.2% had children under the age of 18 living with them, 78.0% were married couples living together, 3.6% had a female householder with no husband present, and 16.5% were non-families. 14.6% of households were one person and 9.6% were one person aged 65 or older. The average household size was 3.00 and the average family size was 3.31.

The age distribution was 26.9% under the age of 18, 5.3% from 18 to 24, 20.9% from 25 to 44, 29.6% from 45 to 64, and 17.3% 65 or older. The median age was 43 years. For every 100 females, there were 92.9 males. For every 100 females age 18 and over, there were 88.9 males.

The median household income was $142,038 and the median family income was $161,545. Males had a median income of $100,000 versus $55,938 for females. The per capita income for the village was $72,476. About 1.6% of families and 2.3% of the population were below the poverty line, including 2.4% of those under age 18 and none of those age 65 or over.

== Government ==
=== Village government ===
As of June 2025, the Mayor of Great Neck Estates is William D. Warner, the Deputy Mayor was Jeffrey Farkas, and the Village Trustees were Ira D. Ganzfried, Howard Hershenhorn, and Lidia Shemesh.

The Mayor and Village Trustees each serve for four-year terms, and they are elected every odd-numbered year.

==== Mayors of Great Neck Estates ====
- William D. Warner
- David Fox
- Murray Seeman
- Lawrence Nadal
- Jean Margouleff

=== Representation in higher government ===
==== Town representation ====
Great Neck Estates is located in the Town of North Hempstead's 5th council district, which as of June 2025 is represented on the North Hempstead Town Council by David A. Adhami (R–Great Neck).

==== Nassau County representation ====
Great Neck Estates is located in Nassau County's 10th Legislative district, which as of June 2025 is represented in the Nassau County Legislature by Mazi Melesa Pilip (R–Great Neck).

==== New York State representation ====
===== New York State Assembly =====
Great Neck Estates is located in the New York State Assembly's 16th State Assembly district, which as of June 2025 is represented by Daniel J. Norber (R–Great Neck).

===== New York State Senate =====
Great Neck Estates is located in the New York State Senate's 7th State Senate district, which as of June 2025 is represented in the New York State Senate by Jack M. Martins (R–Old Westbury).

==== Federal representation ====
===== United States Congress =====
Great Neck Estates is located in New York's 3rd congressional district, which as of June 2025 is represented in the United States Congress by Thomas R. Suozzi (D–Glen Cove).

===== United States Senate =====
Like the rest of New York, Great Neck Estates is represented in the United States Senate by Charles Schumer (D) and Kirsten Gillibrand (D).

=== Politics ===
In the 2024 U.S. presidential election, the majority of Great Neck Estates voters voted for Donald Trump (R).

== Education ==
=== School district ===
Great Neck Estates is located entirely within the boundaries of (and is thus served by) the Great Neck Union Free School District. As such, all children who reside within the village and attend public schools go to Great Neck's schools.

=== Library district ===
Great Neck Estates is located within the boundaries of (and is thus served by) the Great Neck Library District.

== Landmark ==
- Ben Rebhuhn House – A home designed by Frank Lloyd Wright; listed on the National Register of Historic Places.

== Notable people ==
- F. Scott Fitzgerald – Author best known for his 1925 novel, The Great Gatsby; lived at 6 Gateway Drive.
- Lee Seeman – Politician; wife to Murray Seeman.
- Murray Seeman – Lawyer, politician, and real estate developer; husband to Lee Seeman.
- Victor Young – Conductor and composer; lived on Myrtle Drive.

== The Great Gatsby ==
In the 1920s, F. Scott Fitzgerald lived in Great Neck Estates, which is probably Great Neck's greatest claim to fame. It was a modest house, not dissimilar to that of Nick Carraway, the protagonist of his novel, The Great Gatsby. It is said that Fitzgerald modeled West Egg, the fictional town in which Nick lived, next to the mansion of Jay Gatsby, after Great Neck (specifically Kings Point), for its epitome of nouveau riche gaudiness, atmosphere, and lifestyle. He modeled East Egg, the town where Daisy and Tom lived, after Great Neck's eastern neighbor Sands Point, which is part of Port Washington.

== See also ==
- List of municipalities in New York
