= Roxanne Seeman =

American songwriter, lyricist, record producer and theatre producer

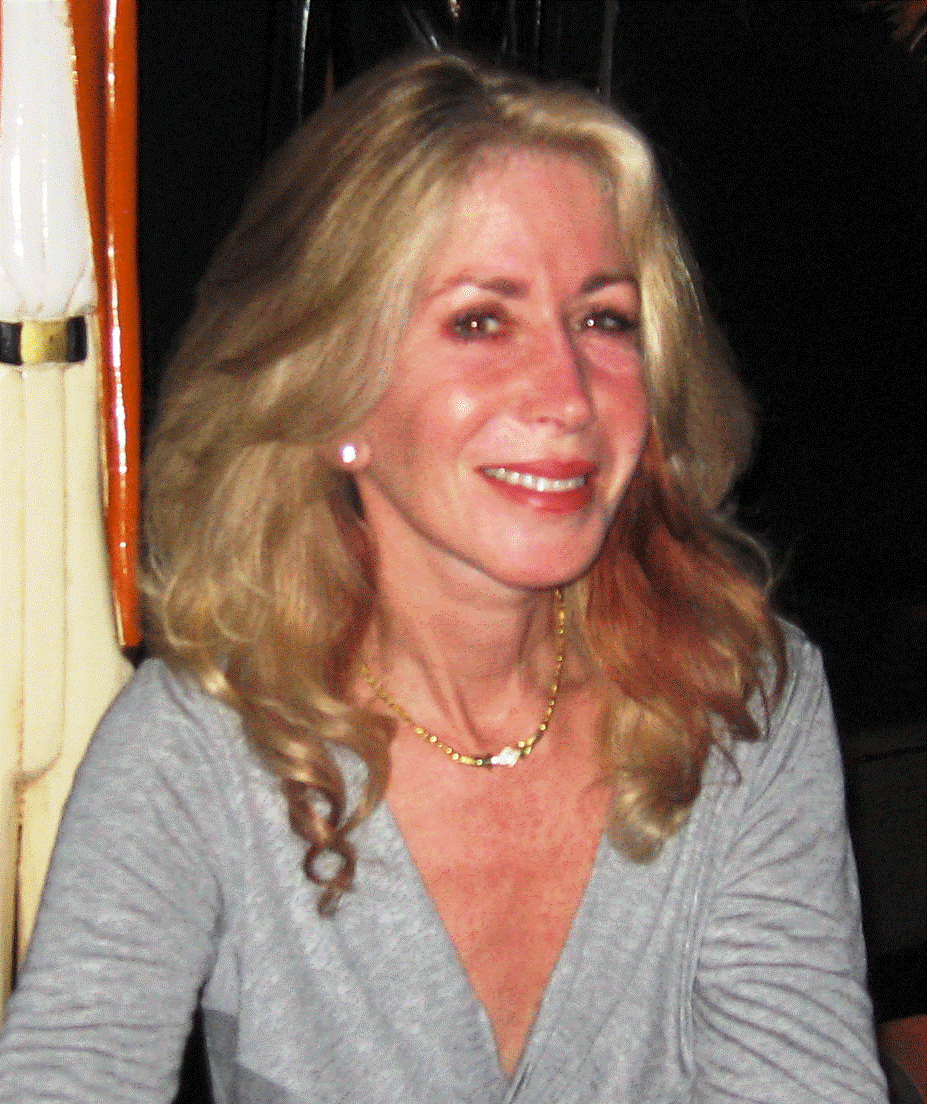
- Roxy in 2008
- Born: Roxanne Joy Seeman; New York City, U.S.
- Other name: Roxy Seeman
- Education: Barnard College, Columbia University
- Occupations: Songwriter; lyricist; record producer; music publisher; Broadway producer
- Years active: 1979–present
- Partner: Billie Hughes (1982–1998)
- Relatives: Murray Seeman (father); Lee Seeman (mother)
- Musical career
- Genres: Pop; R&B; soul; rock; jazz; classical crossover
- Website: noanoamusic.com

Roxanne Joy Seeman is an American songwriter and lyricist. She is best known for her songs by Billie Hughes, Philip Bailey, Phil Collins, Earth, Wind & Fire, Barbra Streisand, Bette Midler, The Sisters of Mercy, The Jacksons, Jacky Cheung, and in film and television. She has two Emmy nominations.

Seeman is a writer and producer of the Japan Gold Disk Award International Single of the Year "Welcome To The Edge" by Billie Hughes.

She has written songs for Chinese artists including Jacky Cheung, Yang Kun, Chen Linong, Super Vocal, Rainie Yang and productions by Zhang Yadong and Gao Xiaosong.

Seeman is a producer of the Broadway shows To Kill a Mockingbird and The Waverly Gallery.

== Early life and education ==
Seeman was born in New York to Jewish parents, Murray Seeman, a lawyer and real estate developer, and his wife, Lee (née Sachs). Her father was a scholar, World War II veteran, and former mayor of Great Neck Estates, where they lived. Thirty-three relatives of the Seeman family were killed in the Holocaust. Her mother, a former member of the U.S. Commission for the Preservation of America's Heritage Abroad, is of Israeli descent dating back to the 1800s on her paternal side and from the Getz family of jewelers on her maternal side.

At age 10, Seeman pursued piano lessons. She took up violin at the Saddle Rock Elementary School and picked up guitar at 16.

During Seeman's high school years, she was an avid fine artist. Seeman attended Carnegie-Mellon University, Pittsburgh, Pennsylvania with the intention of pursuing a career in art. In the practice rooms of Carnegie-Mellon, Seeman found a piano teacher and studied classical piano.

At Carnegie-Mellon, Seeman was on the School Activities Board, booking bands to perform on campus. With a passion for jazz, Seeman attended a jazz theory class taught by Dr. Nathan Davis, Director of Jazz Studies at the University of Pittsburgh where she learned to play "Giant Steps", "Moment's Notice" and "Round Midnight".

Wishing to learn Chinese calligraphy, Seeman attended a class in Chinese language where she learned to write Chinese characters. This motivated Seeman to apply as a transfer student to Columbia University in New York, where she would pursue Asian Studies and be in the music world in New York City.

While on Long Island, Seeman studied piano with Tony Aless, jazz pianist who played with Woody Herman, Charlie Parker, among others. Seeman also took several lessons from Sir Roland Hanna.

Seeman is a graduate of Columbia University and Barnard College, with a B.A. in Oriental Studies, Chinese Arts and Language. She studied Chinese, Japanese and Indian literature, art, and took a class on Chinese music from Professor Chou Wen-Chung.

== Career ==
=== Songwriting career ===
Seeman spent nights in New York City jazz clubs while working as a temporary secretary at Atlantic Records and Warner Communications. In between jobs, while lying on a dock over the Long Island Sound in Kings Point, she was inspired to write lyrics for jazz instrumentals. In NY, she met David Lasley, a songwriter and session singer touring with James Taylor, who sang demos of her lyrics to the instrumentals.

Seeman relocated to Los Angeles in 1977 for a position at ABC Records, which was sold the next year to MCA Records. In 1979 Dee Dee Bridgewater recorded Seeman's lyric version of the Ramsey Lewis instrumental "Tequila Mockingbird", composed by Larry Dunn of Earth, Wind & Fire and produced by George Duke. This led to a collaboration with Philip Bailey of Earth, Wind & Fire, with whom she, Maurice White and Eddie del Barrio wrote "Sailaway", for Earth, Wind & Fire's Faces album.

During this time, she met Carmine Coppola and Italia Pennino and began a collaboration developing themes from Carmine's movie scores into songs, writing lyrics and producing song demos for the themes from The Black Stallion, The Outsiders, and Napoleon.

Seeman began writing originals with David Lasley and others co-writers, producing 24-track recordings at ABC Recording Studios with David Benoit, Bobby Watson, Eduardo del Barrio, David Garibaldi, Doug Rodrigues, Terry Reid, Hubert Laws, Sylvia St. James, Arnold McCuller and ABC staff recording engineers Al Schmitt, Jr. and Zoli Osaze. She met Gerry Brown, a young recording engineer and tape librarian at ABC. He had mixed one of her songs and was listening so enthusiastically, she told him he could mix all of her songs.

While recording at ABC Recording Studios, she met Jermaine Jackson and gave him a demo of the Eumir Deodato - Maurice White composition "Tahiti Hut", an instrumental with her lyrics sung by David Lasley. "Tahiti Hut" was recorded during Jermaine Jackson's sessions with the band Switch, along with the track "Reaching For Tomorrow", co-written with Paul Jackson, Jr and Seeman. "Reaching For Tomorrow" became the title track of Switch's subsequent album, while "Tahiti Hut" remained unreleased until issued as a bonus track on an expanded digital edition of the album in 2019.

In 1982, Seeman signed an exclusive writer agreement with Intersong Music, PolyGram Publishing. While under contract, she wrote "Walking On The Chinese Wall" with Billie Hughes, which her publisher turned down as too unusual, giving her back the song. However, by 1984, Earth, Wind & Fire co-frontman Philip Bailey expressed interest in recording the song, which became the title track of his subsequent solo album Chinese Wall and also a pop hit that cracked the Billboard Hot 100, accompanied by a music video.

Seeman has maintained her own publishing company, Noa Noa Music, named after the Tahitian words "noa noa" (fragrant scent) she used in her lyrics for "Tahiti Hut".

Seeman was interviewed twice by Ray Cordeiro (Uncle Ray) on All the Way with Ray on RTHK Radio 3 in Hong Kong, first in 2009 with producer Andrew Tuason, and again in 2010 with Jacky Cheung and Daniel Nitt. In 2019, Seeman was interviewed by Mike Gormley on The Jeremiah Show as part of the program's Season 6 "Women of Power & Inspiration" series.

Seeman has attended international music conferences, including MIDEM in Cannes, where she had annual dinners with an EMI Brazil executive that led to her writing English lyrics for songs in the EMI Brazil catalog, and met with licensees from Thailand and Indonesia; CEEMPC15 in Istanbul; and the Live at Heart Film & Music Festival Seminar in Örebro, where she appeared as a panelist.

At the 2025 NAMM Show, Seeman appeared on two panels, "The Soul of a Recording: The Producer / Engineer Connection", moderated by record producer Jeffrey Weber, with Gerry Brown, Clark Germain, Michael Lloyd and Bob Kearney, and "Music Career Paths for Underrepresented Populations".

=== Partnership with Billie Hughes ===
Seeman's partnership with recording artist and songwriter/composer Billie Hughes, began in 1983 until his death in 1998.

With Hughes, she wrote "Walking On The Chinese Wall" by Philip Bailey, "If You'd Only Believe" by The Jacksons, "Night And Day" by Bette Midler, "Under The Gun" by The Sisters of Mercy and numerous songs by Billie Hughes in film and television."Walls Of Love" and "I Love The Way You Make Me Feel" performed by Hughes appeared in the original 1989 Baywatch series and were of the only original songs that remained in the 2019 Baywatch HD Remastered series, Season 1 E11 Shelter Me and E12 The Reunion.

Together they wrote and produced Hughes' "Welcome to the Edge" which was nominated for an Emmy. In the same year "Welcome To The Edge" was appearing as a love theme in the television show "Santa Barbara", it appeared as the theme song in the Japanese primetime television show "I’ll Never Love Anyone Anymore" (''もう誰も愛さない'') ("Mou Daremo Aisanai") .

"Welcome To The Edge" was a #1 single in Japan, remaining on the Billboard's Japan Top 10 chart for four months, selling 520,000 copies. It was also the title track of their album "Welcome To The Edge" by Billie Hughes.

Hughes performed "Welcome To The Edge at the NHK Japan Grand Prix Gold Disk Awards where they were up against MC Hammer in the best international single category. Hughes received #1 International Single of the Year.

Seeman and Hughes were nominated for a second Emmy for their song "Dreamlove".

Phil Collins later included Philip Bailey's version of "Walking on the Chinese Wall", which Collins had produced, in his box set Plays Well with Others.

=== Working at Twentieth Century-Fox Films and casting ===
Seeman held the position of Executive Assistant to Scott Rudin, President of Production for 20th Century Fox in the mid-1980s. In 1987, she worked on the film Off Limits, starring Willem Dafoe and Gregory Hines, on location in Bangkok and is credited for Thai casting.

=== Broadway producer ===
Roxanne Seeman & Jamie deRoy are co-producers of Scott Rudin's Broadway productions of "To Kill A Mockingbird" and "The Waverly Gallery". The nominees for the 73rd annual Tony Awards were announced on April 30, 2019, with 9 nominations for "To Kill A Mockingbird" and 2 nominations for "The Waverly Gallery" including Best Revival of A Play and Best Performance by a Leading Actress in a Play by Elaine May.

"The Waverly Gallery" won the Drama Desk Award for Outstanding Revival of A Play and the Drama League Award for Outstanding Revival of a Play. Elaine May won the Tony Award, Drama Desk Award, and Drama League Award for her performance.

=== Songwriting career 1998 to present ===
In 1998, Terry Reid recorded "In Love and War" for the finale episode of the Conan the Adventurer TV series scored by Charles Fox with music by Fox and lyrics by Seeman.

Seeman wrote the English lyrics "Come Back To Me" for "Gel Ey Seher", a poem by Fikret Goja set to music by Polad Bülbüloğlu. The song was a hit song for Bulbuloglu in the late 1960’s. In 1998, Paul Buckmaster was commissioned to write a new arrangement for Bulbuloglu, then Minister of Culture of Azerbaijan, recommending Seeman for an English version.

In 1999, Barbra Streisand released "Let's Start Right Now", an adaptation of the Brazilian song "Raios de Luz" with Roxanne Seeman's original English lyrics, recorded with a 72 piece orchestra arranged and conducted by Jorge Calandrelli. It was included as a bonus CD single in a limited edition of Streisand's A Love Like Ours album and as a bonus track on the international CD single release of Streisand's duet with Vince Gill.

In 2002, Seeman wrote English lyrics for Alejandro Sanz' Quisiera Ser onstage Grammy duet with Destiny's Child, performed in Spanish and English, with Beyoncé singing Seeman's English lyrics in the bridge.

In 2003, Jermaine Jackson performed "Let's Start Right Now" on The View.

Seeman participated in the 2003 Songwriters Summit at Henson Studios along with Lamont Dozier, K.C. Porter, and Narada Michael Walden, sponsored by the Oneness organization. Oneness organization whose goal was to inspire songs promoting social and racial unity.

For Sarah Brightman, Seeman wrote "Harem", original English lyrics for "Cancao do Mar", a Portuguese fado made famous by Amalia Rodrigues. "Harem" was a dance club chart single, video and title of Sarah Brightman's Harem album, which stayed in the Billboard Top 10 Crossover Classical chart for over 80 weeks.

In December 2008, Daniel Lindstrom, first Swedish Pop Idol winner, released "Caught In That Feeling", written by Seeman, Lindstrom, and Samsson, as the second single from his D-Day album.

In March 2009, Seeman and Philipp Steinke began a writing collaboration while Steinke, from Berlin, was in Los Angeles. In the same year, Alejandra Guzmán, Mexico's "Queen Of Rock", released "Amor En Suspenso (Crocodile Tears)", written by Seeman and Steinke with Spanish lyrics by Guzman and Fernando Osorio, on Guzman's Único album on EMI Latin.

Seeman and Steinke wrote "Everyday Is Christmas" and "Which Way, Robert Frost?" for Jacky Cheung's "Private Corner" album. Earth, Wind & Fire covered "Everyday is Christmas" on their "Holiday" album released in 2014. In 2016, Nils Landgren covered "Everyday Is Christmas" on his Christmas With My Friends V album.

Austrian blues-rock singer Saint Lu released "Falling For Your Love", written by Saint Lu, Seeman, and Jimmy Messer for Saint Lu's 2 album released in 2013. A live acoustic video of the song premiered on YouTube.

December 2015, Argentinian tenor Eduardo Bosio, recorded Seeman's lyrics "Part Of Me", adapting Beethoven's "Moonlight Sonata" into a new song.

June 2018, The Stanley Clarke Band released the album "The Message" with "Lost In A World", written by Stanley Clarke, Beka Gochiashvili, Cameron Graves, Mike Mitchell, Seeman, Skyeler Kole and Trevor Wesley.

=== Asia ===
In early 2009, Seeman began writing in LA for Jacky Cheung, China's "God of Songs", in collaboration with Andrew Tuason, producer, and Cheung, both in Hong Kong. Seeman wrote five songs: "Everyday Is Christmas", "Which Way, Robert Frost", "Let It Go", "Lucky In Love" and "Double Trouble" with German and Scandinavian co-writers in Europe, in a jazz style Cheung later coined "Canto-jazz". Four songs were adapted into Cantonese while "Everyday Is Christmas" he sings in English. When the album was finished, Cheung called it "Private Corner".

Cheung wanted to try a different style, jazz, for his new album which he called Private Corner, because Cheung says it is a personal expression, something he wanted to do for himself. The first song, "Everyday Is Christmas", Seeman co-wrote with Philipp Steinke. Cheung liked "Everyday Is Christmas" so much, he asked Seeman and Steinke to write another song and they composed "Which Way, Robert Frost?". Seeman continued to write songs for Cheung in the new "Canto-jazz" style, a phrase Cheung coined to describe the music of his Private Corner album. "不只有緣 (Lucky in Love)", "Double Trouble", "Let It Go", "Which Way, Robert Frost?", and "Everyday Is Christmas", were co-written with European collaborators and all of the songs were adapted into Cantonese, except "Everyday Is Christmas". Cheung said he tried having the lyrics for "Everyday Is Christmas" adapted into Cantonese, but he liked the meaning of the lyrics in English so much that he decided to record it in English. Nokia's music download service website (Ovi.com) announced that "Everyday Is Christmas" was the 10th most downloaded Christmas song in the world in 2010, joining classic hits such as Wham's 'Last Christmas' and Mariah Carey's "All I Want for Christmas is You". Jacky is the only Chinese language singer to make it into the Top Ten.

In 2009, the newly formed South Korean girl group 4Minute with Kim Hyun-Ah of The Wonder Girls, recorded "Tick Tock". When 4 Minute did not release "Tick Tock", it was recorded by Rainie Yang (Sony Taiwan) in Mandarin. "Tick Tock (Rainie Yang song Qing Chun Dou)" by Rainie Yang was featured in the hit Taiwanese TV drama Hi My Sweetheart starring Rainie Yang and Show Lo. "Tick Tock" is co-written with Kine L. Fossheim and Olav Fossheim.

Following Seeman's trip to Asia in 2009, her songs were recorded by Rainie Yang, Jacky Cheung, Evan Yo, Allen Su, Amber Kuo, Yang Kun, Linda Chung, and Stephy Tang.

The Jacky Cheung 1/2 Century Tour opened at the Mercedes-Benz Arena, Shanghai on New Year's Eve 2011. Cheung's stage performance of "Double Trouble" featured a set built on the flip side of a 60-foot LCD screen, 25 musicians, 18 dancers, and a prop helicopter that he exited the stage from.

In 2011, Yang Kun released "Hui Bu Hui (Will We)", written by Seeman with Fredrik Samsson and Tobias Forsberg and produced by Zhang Yadong. The song is the theme song and music video for the Mainland China hit thriller "Lost in Panic Cruise".

In November 2011, Lin Yu-chun, who gained fame by his viral performance of "I Will Always Love You" on One Million Star (超級星光大道), released "Saving Grace", written by Seeman with Steinke and Finn Martin.

Seeman returned to Hong Kong in May 2012 for the finale concerts of Jacky Cheung's 1/2 Century Tour joining Han Xue in Suzhou, after recording "Lonely Kiss" for They Said released by Gold Typhoon. She continued to Shanghai, Beijing, where she met with Ai Dai, and on to Tokyo.

In 2013, while Paolo Onesa was appearing on the first season of The Voice of the Philippines, he recorded Seeman and Daniel Nitt's "Lucky in Love" ("Bu Zhi You Yuan", 不只有緣). Seeman was in Manila in October during the show's first season. MCA Music released Onesa's recording as a single and included it as a bonus track on The Voice of the Philippines: The Final 4. It was also the lead single from his debut studio album, Pop Goes Standards, released on February 14, 2014. "Lucky in Love" won two Awit Awards at the 27th Awit Awards, for Best Performance by a Male Recording Artist and Best Performance by a New Male Recording Artist.

Onesa also recorded Seeman and Philipp Steinke's "Which Way, Robert Frost?" for Pop Goes Standards. The recording received four nominations at the 28th Awit Awards in 2015: Paolo Onesa for Best Performance by a Male Recording Artist, Benjie Pating for Best Musical Arrangement, Arnie Mendaros for Best Vocal Arrangement, and Ferdie Marquez and Efren San Pedro of Freq Studio and 12 Stone Studio for Best Engineered Recording.

Jason Dy, winner of The Voice of The Philippines (season 2) performed "Caught in that Feeling" live during the All Star Cast Finale Episode on March 7, 2015. The studio recording of the song was released March 30, 2015 as the lead single from his self-titled album Jason Dy, also including Seeman's songs "Turn Out The Night" and "When You Hear This Song".

Zendee released "Watch This!" and a cover of "When Love Calls Your Name" on her album Z, released on August 7, 2015 by MCA Music Universal Philippines.

On September 22, 2016, Kyle Echarri, 13 year old contestant of The Voice Of The Philippines, season 2, released Seeman's song "Our Moment", co-written with Philip Doron Bailey, jr., Jens Hoy, and Rasmus Rudolph Soegaard.

On April 28, 2017, Edray Teodoro, contestant of The Voice Kids of The Philippines season 1 (2014), released her first EP, including Seeman's song "What You Doin' Tonight", co-written by Tinashe Sibanda and Melody Hernandez Noel.

On September 9, 2017, the Chinese version "久久真爱 (Forever True Love)" of Seeman's song "The Story of Us" was released as a theme song for Irene 9·9 International True Love Day Ceremony. The song was recorded by CARO Su Ai and produced by Gao Xiaosong.

On March 20, 2020, China's first male bel canto quartet, Super Vocal, performed "Qui con me (Ni De Se Cai)" ("Your Colors") on the Hunan Television singing competition "Singer 2020", in both Italian and Chinese lyrics. The performance received more than 40 million views in 24 hours. The studio version single of "Ni De Se Cai" was released on March 27, 2020, by Decca China. "Ni De Se Cai" was composed by Seeman, George Komsky, and Ivo Moring with Italian lyrics "Qui con me" written by Saverio Principini, and Chinese lyrics "Ni De Se Cai" written by Cheng He. The song was produced by Nick Patrick and Wu Qinglong.

December 2020 Aarif Rahman (Chinese: 李治廷; Pinyin: Lǐ Zhìtíng) released "Won't You Be Mine" by Aarif Li Zhiting, Daryl Wang, and Seeman.

On July 30, 2021, Rose Liu (刘明湘) released "Ain't Gonna Wait" (没时间等你) written by Seeman, Boon Hui Lu, I-Wei Wu and Victor Lau at the MUST Songwriting Camp.

August 2024 Chen Linong (Chinese: 陈立农; Pinyin: Chen Linong) released "Compromise" by Seeman and Gao Fansheng.

January 22, 2025 Too Young To Grow Old, the 24-episode streaming spinoff series of To Us, From Us debuted in China on iQIYI, featuring an on-camera performance of Seeman’s “So Sad To Say Goodbye”. Seeman and Fansheng Gao, OST music producer and collaborator, attended the first screening in Shenzhen, June 2023, held by director Lanxin Yu.

=== Film and television ===
Seeman wrote "So Hard To Know" for Chet Baker, appearing in Bruce Weber's Oscar-nominated documentary Let's Get Lost".

February 19, 1994, The Jackson Family Honors live ABC telecast from Las Vegas at the MGM Grand Hotel featured Seeman, Hughes and Jermaine Jackson's song "If You'd Only Believe", in the finale performance with Michael Jackson, Celine Dion among many guest artists. March 15, 1993, The Jacksons performed the song on the stage of the Grand Théâtre de Genève for The Evening Of The Nations. On January 14, 1990, Jermaine Jackson performed the song in tribute to Martin Luther King, during King Week '90 in Atlanta.

"Welcome to the Edge" received an Emmy nomination for Best Original Song in the TV drama Santa Barbara in 1991. In 1994, Seeman and Hughes received a second Emmy nomination for Best Original Song for "Dreamlove" in the TV drama Another World. In 1996, Seeman received Special Recognition for Musical Contribution, Daytime Drama Guiding Light, for her work with, and the Emmy awarded to, music director, Jonathan Firstenberg.

With Earth, Wind & Fire, Seeman co-wrote "Cruisin'" for Spike Lee's Get On The Bus. In collaboration with Eric Levi of ERA and Philip Bailey of Earth, Wind & Fire, Seeman wrote "People And Places", the end-title song of the French film La Vengeance d'une blonde.

Seeman co-wrote "Hold On To The Good Things" for Stuart Little 2, recorded by Grammy-winning artist Shawn Colvin. "Hold On To The Good Things" appears as the second end-credit song.

From William Ross' theme for The Young Black Stallion, Seeman and Gavin Greenaway developed and produced the song "Born To Ride" sung by Biana Tamimi, the 11-year-old actress from the film, for the DVD release December 2004.

Seeman co-wrote "不只有緣 (Lucky in Love)" with Daniel Nitt for Jacky Cheung. "不只有緣 (Lucky in Love)" appears over the end-credits of Crossing Hennessy, a Hong Kong movie produced by William Kong. "Crossing Hennessy", starring Tang Wei (Lust, Caution) and Jacky Cheung, premiered as the opening night film for the 34th Hong Kong International Film Festival March 21. The track is produced by Andrew Tuason.

For Arif Mardin's All My Friends Are Here album and The Greatest Ears in Town: The Arif Mardin Story companion documentary released in 2010, Seeman wrote lyrics for Mardin's composition So Blue. featuring Chaka Khan and David Sanborn.

"Hui Bu Hui (Will We)" written by Seeman and performed by lead actor Yang Kun appears as the theme song of the Mainland China thriller Lost In Panic Cruise released October 27, 2011.

Seeman's songs appeared in the 2012 Nickelodeon television series Hollywood Heights.

Seeman and Riccardo Cocciante wrote "When Love Calls Your Name" for The Voice of Italy winner Elhaida Dan, who performed the song on the May 30, 2013 finale show. Cocciante joined Dani on stage, performing an emotional reprise of "When Love Calls Your Name".

"Qing Chun Dou" by Rainie Yang appears in Netflix Marvel's Daredevil, season 2, episode 1. "Qing Chun Dou" is the Mandarin language version of "Tick Tock (Beat The Clock)", written by Seeman - Ludvigsen - Fossheim.

=== Musical theatre ===
For Jambalaya, The Musical, Seeman and Kennard Ramsey wrote the song "Put It In The Pot", an all cast song performance. "Jambalaya, The Musical", written and directed by Nancy Gregory, premiered November 30 at The Orpheum Theatre, New Orleans, for a four night run with a three night return run on December 21, 2016 and showcase performances at the Jefferson Performing Arts Center in Metairie, Louisiana.

=== Veterans History Project ===
As an advocate, for the Veterans History Project 20th Anniversary Event Celebration, Seeman contributed a song performance in tribute to Murray Seeman, World War II veteran, with an introduction to his collection of video interviews, photos, and letters being donated to the Library of Congress archives. Pianist Elise Solberg accompanied Hannah Goldblatt singing "In Love And War" written by Seeman with Charles Fox. The performance was filmed at Mack Sennett Studios, and live-streamed on November 7, 2020, from the Library of Congress, Washington, D.C.

On the weekend of Memorial Day 2021, Seeman appeared on The Jeremiah Show for a tribute episode with Solberg and Goldblatt to talk with about the making of their song performance of "In Love And War" for the Veterans History Project.

=== Film discography ===
Year	Film	Song	Artist	Writers	Director	Studio
2011	Lost in Panic Cruise(Mi Shi Zi Ke Kao An)	Hui Bu Hui (Face to Face)	Yang Kun	Roxanne Seeman - Fredrik Samsson - Tobias Forsberg	Fanfan Zhang	Beijing Shengshi Huarui Film Company
2010	Crossing Hennessy (Yut Mun Hinneisi)	Lucky In Love	Jacky Cheung	Roxanne Seeman - Daniel Nitt	Ivy Ho	Edko Films, Ltd.
2011	Summer Love	No One Knows	Terence Siufay	Roxanne Seeman - Kine Ludvigsen - Olav Fossheim	Wilson Chin	Sun Entertainment
2010	The Greatest Ears in Town: The Arif Mardin Story	So Blue	Chaka Khan - David Sanborn	Roxanne Seeman - Arif Mardin	Doug Biro - Joe Mardin	Joe Mardin
2003	The Young Black Stallion	Born To Ride	Biana Tamimi	William Ross - Roxanne Seeman - Gavin Greenaway	Simon Wincer	The Kennedy/Marshall Company - Disney IMAX
2002	Stuart Little 2	Hold On To The Good Things	Shawn Colvin	Roxanne Seeman - Holly Knight	Rob Minkoff	Columbia Pictures
2000	Jonghab Beyongwon The Movie: Cheonil Dangan (General Hospital)	Welcome To The Edge	Billie Hughes	Roxanne Seeman - Bille Hughes - Dominic Messinger	Yun-seok Choi	AFDF (Korea)
1996	Get on the Bus	Cruisin'	Earth Wind & Fire	Roxanne Seeman, Philip Bailey, Sonny Emory, Morris Pleasure	Spike Lee	Columbia Pictures, 40 Acres and a Mule Filmworks
1995	Pourquoi maman est dans mon lit?	Africa	Billie Hughes	Roxanne Seeman - Billie Hughes	Patrick Malakian	Gaumont
1995	Above Suspicion (1995 film)	Yours	Scott Mayo	Roxanne Seeman - Philip Bailey - Chuck Wild	Steven Schachter	Rysher Entertainment
1994	La Vengeance d'une Blonde	People and Places	Philip Bailey - Dee Dee Bridgewater	Roxanne Seeman - Eric Levi - Philip Bailey	Jeannot Szwarc	Les Films de la Colline
1992	Chain of Desire	So Hard To Know	Chet Baker	Roxanne Seeman - Rique Pantoja	Temistocles Lopez	Distant Horizon - Mad Dog Pictures - October Films
1990	Under Crystal Lake	Safe Back In Your Arms	Warren Wiebe	Roxanne Seeman - Darin Scheff - Tony Smith	Kris Kertenian	American Entertainment Circle
1988	Let's Get Lost (1988 film)	So Hard To Know	Chet Baker	Roxanne Seeman	Bruce Weber	Little Bear Films
1985	The Heavenly Kid	Heart of Love	Jamie Bond	Roxanne Seeman - Billie Hughes	Cary Medoway	Orion Pictures
1989	Little Monsters	I Wanna Yell	Billie Hughes	Roxanne Seeman - Billie Hughes	Richard Greenberg	Vestron/MGM Films
1982	Fighting Back (1982 American film)	Meant For You	Debra Laws	Roxanne Seeman - David Lasley	Lewis Teague	Paramount Pictures
1980	New Year's Evil	New Year's Evil	Shadow	Roxanne Seeman - Eduardo del Barrio	Emmet Alston	Cannon Films

== Discography ==
Phil Collins Plays Well with Others/Philip Bailey	Walking On The Chinese Wall	Writer
The Stanley Clarke Band	Lost In A World	Writer
Earth, Wind & Fire	Everyday Is Christmas	Writer
Arif Mardin feat. Chaka Khan & David Sanborn	So Blue	Writer
Alejandra Guzman	Amor en Suspenso (Crocodile Tears)	Writer
Sarah Brightman	Harem (single)	Writer
Shawn Colvin	Hold On To The Good Things	Writer
Barbra Streisand	Let's Start Right Now	Writer
Diane Schuur	I'd Fly	Writer
Philip Bailey	Sail Away	Writer
Phyllis Hyman	Maybe Tomorrow (Four Tops song)	Writer
Earth, Wind & Fire	Divine	Writer
Melissa Manchester	Heart of Love	Writer
Philip Bailey	Yours	Writer
The Sisters of Mercy	Under the Gun (single)	Writer
Earth, Wind & Fire	Cruising	Writer
Double You	Walking On The Chinese Wall	Writer
Laima	Dreamlove	Writer
Randy Crawford	If You'd Only Believe	Writer
Billie Hughes	Dreamlove	Writer
Billie Hughes	Welcome To The Edge (single)	Writer
Bette Midler	Night & Day (single)	Writer
The Jacksons	If You'd Only Believe	Writer
Chet Baker/Rique Pantoja	So Hard To Know	Writer
Angela Bofill/Peabo Bryson	For You & I	Writer
Terri Gonzalez	Dynamic Attraction	Writer
The Manhattans feat. Regina Belle	Maybe Tomorrow (Four Tops song)	Writer
The Four Tops feat Phyllis Hyman	Maybe Tomorrow (Four Tops song)	Writer
Randy Crawford	Actual Emotional Love	Writer
The Triplets	Win Your Love	Writer
Jamie Bond (The Heavenly Kid soundtrack)	Heart of Love (single)	Writer
Earth, Wind & Fire	Straight From the Heart	Writer
Dianne Reeves	Passageway	Writer
Stephanie Mills	Wailin'	Writer
Revelation	Without Love	Writer
Sylvia St. James	Grace	Writer
Stanley Turrentine	Only You & Me	Writer
Debra Laws	Meant For You (single)	Writer
Debra Laws	All The Things I Love	Writer
Jean Carne	Don't Say No (To Love)	Writer
Earth, Wind & Fire	Sailaway	Writer
Switch/Jermaine Jackson	Reaching for Tomorrow	Writer
Dee Dee Bridgewater	Tequila Mockingbird	Writer

== International recordings ==
Song	Artist	Writers	Producer	Label	Territory
Cuo Dui Le (Wrong But Right)	Boon Hui Lu	Boon Huilu - Victor Lau - Roxanne Seeman - I-Wei Wu	Bing Wang	HIM Music	Taiwan
Everyday Is Christmas	Nils Landgren	Seeman - Steinke		ACT Music	Europe
What You Doin' Tonight	Edray Teodoro	Seeman - Hernandez - Sibanda		MCA Music (Universal Music Philippines)	Philippines
Our Moment	Kyle Echarri	Seeman - Bailey - Hoy - Soegaard	Francis Guevarra	MCA Music (Universal Music Philippines)	Philippines
Caught In That Feeling	Jason Dy	Seeman - Lindstrom - Samsson	Fredrik Samsson	MCA Music (Universal Music Philippines)	Philippines
Caught In That Feeling	Jason Dy	Seeman - Lindstrom - Samsson	Moh Denebi	MCA Music (Universal Music Philippines)	Philippines
When You Hear This Song	Jason Dy	Seeman - Nitt		MCA Music (Universal Music Philippines)	Philippines
Turn Out The Night	Jason Dy	Seeman - Moring - Messinger		MCA Music (Universal Music Philippines)	Philippines
Which Way, Robert Frost?	Paolo Onesa	Seeman - Steinke	Francis Guevarra	MCA Music (Universal Music Philippines)	Philippines
Lucky In Love	Paolo Onesa	Seeman - Nitt	Francis Guevarra	MCA Music (Universal Music Philippines)	Philippines
When Love Calls Your Name	Elhaida Dani	Seeman - Cocciante	Riccardo Cocciante	Universal Italy	Italy
Falling For Your Love	Saint Lu	Saint Lu - Seeman - Messer	Patrik Majer	Warner Germany	Europe
Lonely Kiss	Cecilia Han	Seeman - Christensen - Lange - Munk	Cecilia Han	Gold Typhoon	China
Saving Grace	Lin Yu-Chun	Seeman - Steinke - Martin		Sony Music	Taiwan China
Hui Bu Hui (Will We)	Yang Kun	Seeman - Samsson - Forsberg	Zhang Yadong		China
Reach Out (That's What It's All About)	Oslo Soul Children	Seeman - Fossheim - Ludvigsen	Olav Fossheim	MTG Music	Norway
No One Knows	Stephy Tang	Seeman - Fossheim - Ludvigsen	Gary Chan	Gold Typhoon	Hong Kong China
When You Hear This Song	Allen Su	Seeman - Nitt		Sony Music	China
Arrest Me	Amber Kuo	Seeman - Grubert - Zuckowski	Andrew Chen	Warner Music	Taiwan China
Everyday Is Christmas	Jacky Cheung	Seeman - Steinke	Andrew Tuason	Universal	Hong Kong China
Lucky In Love	Jacky Cheung	Seeman - Nitt	Andrew Tuason	Universal	Hong Kong China
Double Trouble	Jacky Cheung	Seeman - Fossheim Ludvigsen	Andrew Tuason	Universal	Hong Kong China
Which Way Robert Frost	Jacky Cheung	Seeman - Steinke	Andrew Tuason	Universal	Hong Kong China
Let It Go	Jacky Cheung	Seeman - Lindstrom - Musto	Andrew Tuason	Universal	Hong Kong China
Tick Tock	Rainie Yang	Seeman - Fossheim - Ludvigsen	Andrew Tuason	Sony Music	Taiwan China
Tick Tock	Rainie Yang	Seeman - Fossheim - Ludvigsen	Andrew Tuason	Sony Music	Japan
Cha Cha Cha	Linda Chung	Seeman - Fossheim - Ludvigsen	Andrew Tuason	Star Entertainment	Hong Kong China
All Pumped Up	Evan Yo	Seeman - Grubert - Zuckowski		Sony Music	Taiwan China
Caught In That Feeling	Daniel Lindstrom	Seeman - Lindstrom - Samsson	Fredrik Samsson - Moh Denebi	Laluff Music	Sweden
Let's Start Right Now	Leila Maria	Seeman - Silva - Bastos		Rob Digital	Brasil
Goodnite But Not Goodbye	Nina	Seeman - Keller - Oberoff		Waner Music	Philippines
Welcome To The Edge	Billie Hughes	Seeman - Hughes - Messinger	Hughes	Pony Canyon Warner Music	Japan
Welcome To The Edge	Billie Hughes	Seeman - Hughes - Messinger	Seeman	Pony Canyon Warner Music	SE Asia
Theme From The Edge	Billie Hughes	Seeman - Hughes - Messinger	Hughes	Pony Canyon Warner Music	Japan
Theme From The Edge	Billie Hughes	Seeman - Hughes - Messinger	Seeman	Pony Canyon Warner Music	SE Asia
Hurricane	Billie Hughes	Seeman - Hughes	Hughes	Pony Canyon Warner Music	Japan
Hurricane	Billie Hughes	Seeman - Hughes	Seeman	Pony Canyon Warner Music	SE Asia
Night & Day	Billie Hughes	Seeman - Hughes	Hughes	Pony Canyon Warner Music	Japan
Night & Day	Billie Hughes	Seeman - Hughes	Seeman	Pony Canyon Warner Music	SE Asia
I'll See You Again	Billie Hughes	Seeman - Hughes	Hughes	Pony Canyon Warner Music	Japan
I'll See You Again	Billie Hughes	Seeman - Hughes	Seeman	Pony Canyon Warner Music	SE Asia
Two Worlds Apart	Billie Hughes	Seeman - Hughes	Hughes	Pony Canyon Warner Music	Japan
Two Worlds Apart	Billie Hughes	Seeman - Hughes	Seeman	Pony Canyon Warner Music	SE Asia
The Blue Line	Billie Hughes	Seeman - Hughes	Hughes	Pony Canyon Warner Music	Japan
The Blue Line	Billie Hughes	Seeman - Hughes	Seeman	Pony Canyon Warner Music	SE Asia
Dreamlove	Billie Hughes	Seeman - Hughes	Hughes	Pony Canyon Warner Music	Japan
Dreamlove	Billie Hughes	Seeman - Hughes	Seeman	Pony Canyon Warner Music	SE Asia
Wish You Were Around	Billie Hughes	Seeman - Hughes	Hughes	Pony Canyon Warner Music	Japan
Wish You Were Around	Billie Hughes	Seeman - Hughes	Seeman	Pony Canyon Warner Music	SE Asia
Expectations Of Love	David Lasley	Seeman - Bailey - Sigman - Robbins	Seeman	Passion	UK
Will To Survive	David Lasley	Seeman - Oliver - Dreau	Seeman Oliver	Passion	UK
Night Of Our Lives	David Lasley	Seeman - Oliver - Messinger	Seeman Oliver	Passion	UK
Revelations	David Lasley	Seeman - Oliver	Seeman Oliver	Passion	UK
Meant For You	David Lasley	Seeman - Lasley	Lasley Seeman	Cool Sounds	Japan
Your Voice	David Lasley	Seeman - Lasley	Lasley Seeman	Cool Sounds	Japan
Til I Walk With You	David Lasley	Seeman - Lasley	Lasley Seeman	Cool Sounds	Japan
I'd Fly	Riccardo Cocciante & Francesca Bellenis	Seeman - Cocciante Dreau	Richard Cocciante	Virgin/Italy "Un Uomo Felice"	Europe
Show Me	Barbara Weathers	Seeman - Cocciante	Jeffrey Weber	Polygram	Japan
For You And I	Paola Mei	Seeman - Del Barrio	Italy	Interbeat	Italy
People And Places	Philip Bailey & Dee Dee Bridgewater	Seeman - Bailey - Levi	Eric Levi	BMG	France
People And Places	Philip Bailey & Dee Dee Bridgewater	Seeman - Bailey - Levi	Eric Levi	BMG	Asia
Walking On The Chinese Wall	Philip Bailey/una Canzone	Seeman - Hughes	Phil Collins	P.M./Sony	Italy
Walking On The Chinese Wall	Indiana	Seeman - Hughes		Blanco Y Negro	Spain
Walking On The Chinese Wall	Indiana	Seeman - Hughes		Blanco Y Negro	Italy
Welcome To The Edge	Santa Barbara Soundtrack	Seeman - Hughes - Messinger		Intercord	Germany
Welcome To The Edge	Wink	Seeman - Hughes - Messinger		Polystar	Japan
Welcome To The Edge	Mie Yamamoto	Seeman - Hughes - Messinger		Apollo Sounds	Japan
Welcome To The Edge	Bon Chic	Seeman - Hughes - Messinger		Teichiku	Japan
Welcome To The Edge	The Nolans	Seeman - Hughes - Messinger		Virgin	Japan
Welcome To The Edge	Bill Champlain	Seeman - Hughes - Messinger		King	Japan
Welcome To The Edge	The Best Hits Of T.V Theme	Seeman - Hughes - Messinger		Toshiba / Emi	Japan
Welcome To The Edge	New Energy Beat	Seeman - Hughes - Messinger		Pony Canyon	Japan
Welcome To The Edge	Fuji Television Themes	Seeman - Hughes - Messinger		Nippon Phonogram	Japan
Welcome To The Edge	Crystal Sound Orchestra	Seeman - Hughes - Messinger	Valentin Coupeau	Alfa Records Compilations	Japan
Night And Day	Jasmine	Seeman - Hughes		Polystar	Japan
Night And Day	Jasmine	Seeman - Hughes		Polystar	Hong Kong
Night And Day	Cherrie Tsoi	Seeman - Hughes		Warner Music	Hong Kong
Welcome To The Edge	Joyce	Seeman - Hughes - Messinger		Golden Pony	Hong Kong
Love Is An Art	Wink	Seeman - Hughes - Keller		Polystar	Japan
My World	Wink	Seeman - Hughes		Polystar	Japan
Night And Day	Wink	Seeman - Hughes		Polystar	Japan
Mysterious	Wink	Seeman - Curiale		Polystar	Japan
The Hotter The Night	Sachiko Suzuki	Seeman - Goldberg - St. James		Polystar	Japan
Expectations Of Love	David Lasley	Seeman - Bailey - Sigman - Robbins	Seeman	Crazy Time Magazine	Italy
Yours	Scott Mayo	Seeman - Bailey - Chuck Wild	Seeman	New Sounds Monografie Magazine	Italy
Night Of Our Lives	David Lasley	Seeman - Oliver - Messinger	Seeman Oliver	Crazy Time Magazine	Italy
Ready To Fall In Love	David Lasley	Seeman - Lasley - Barken - Black		Crazy Time Magazine	Italy
Winter, Summer	Steve Tavaglione	Seeman - Bailey - Chuck Wild	Seeman	New Age Magazine "sky" Sampler	Italy
Night Of Our Lives	David Lasley	Seeman - Oliver - Messinger	Seeman Oliver	Crazy Time Magazine	Italy
Night Of Our Lives	Steve Tavaglione	Seeman - Oliver - Messinger	Seeman Oliver	New Sounds Monografie Magazine	Italy
Yours	Philip Bailey	Seeman - Bailey - Chuck Wild	Seeman Bailey	Crazy Time Magazine	Italy
For You & I	Satoshi Ikeda	Seeman - Del Barrio		Teichiku	Japan
Love Is An Art	Joe Yamanaka	Seeman - Hughes - Keller	Bunetta Chudakoff	Bunetta, Chudakoff & Kitajima	Japan
I Don't Mind	Joe Yamanaka	Seeman - Steele - Del Barrio	Bunetta Chudakoff	Bunetta, Chudakoff & Kitajima	Japan
What Will We Do Now	Yuki Kuni	Seeman - Hughes	Osamu Kitajima	Higher Octave / Teichiku	Japan
The Blue Line	Iwasake Yoshimi	Seeman - Hughes	Bobby Watson	CBS /Sony	Japan
One Step	Kazuo Takeda	Seeman - Ballard - Marcoulier	Ballard Marcoulier	JVC/Victor	Japan
My World	Zoe Heywood	Seeman - Hughes	Yasohachi '88	CBS/Sony	Japan
Expectations Of Love	Jeff Sigman	Seeman - Bailey - Sigman - Robbins	Seeman	Polydor	Japan
Expectations Of Love	David Lasley	Seeman - Bailey - Sigman - Robbins	Seeman	Polydor	Japan
Love Brought Us Here	Rique Pantoja	Seeman - Pantoja	Pantoja	Pony Canyon WEA	Japan Brazil
In A Night	Rique Pantoja	Seeman - Pantoja	Pantoja	Pony Canyon WEA	Japan Brazil
I'll See You Again	Allan Clarke	Seeman - Hughes	Tony Taverner	Italy	Germany
Every Heart Has A Vision	Allan Clarke	Seeman - Hughes	Tony Taverner	Italy	Germany
Mwanzia	Roger Christian	Seeman - Hughes	Gary Katz	Island	England
Love Is An Art	Pernilla Wahlgren	Seeman - Hughes - Keller	Ingrosso & Bolyos	Sonet	Sweden
Walking On The Chinese Wall	Young Talent Team Now & Then 15th Anniversary	Seeman - Hughes		Hammond TV Prods/Records	Australia
Anna Maria	Tsu-Ba-Sa	Seeman - Hughes	Giroh Gotoh	Sony Music	Japan
The Way You Make Me Feel	Kamifusen	Seeman - Hughes - Nelson	Hughes & Gotoh	West Wings	Japan
The Outside In	Kamifusen	Coppola - Pennino - Seeman	Henry Lewy	2nd Avenue King	Japan
The Outside In	I Ragazzi Della 54th Strada	Coppola - Pennino - Seeman	Carmine Coppola	Italy	Italy
Heart On The Line	Grace Kennedy	Seeman - Phillips	Philip Swirn	DJM	England
Heart On The Line	Grace Kennedy	Seeman - Phillips	Philip Swirn	DJM	So. Africa
Tequila Mockingbird	ITS	Seeman - Dunn	Akira Taguchi	JVC	Japan
Bittersweet	ITS	Seeman - Ritenour	Akira Taguchi	JVC	Japan
