= Rogerio Caetano =

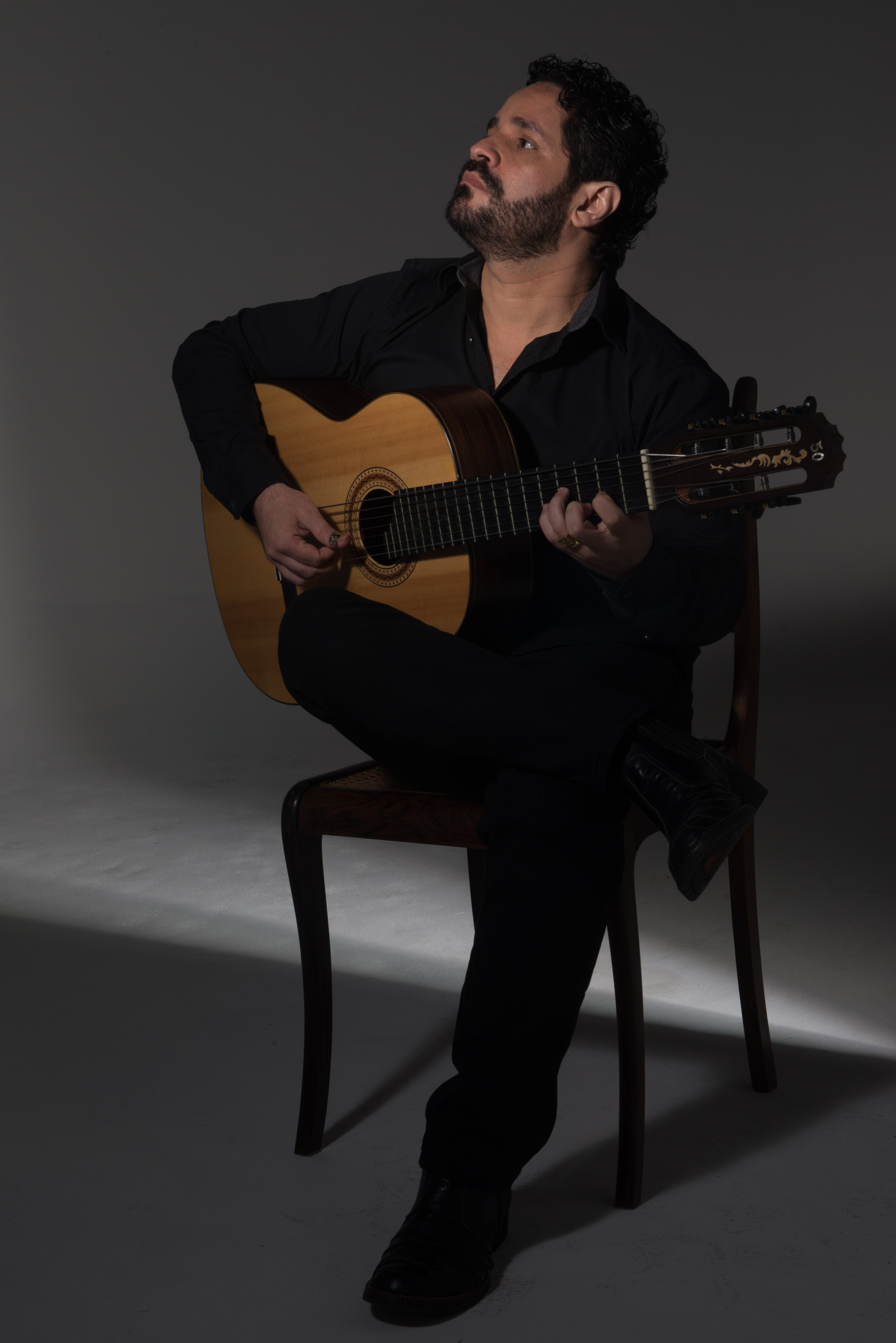

Background information
- Birth name: Rogério Caetano de Almeida
- Born: September 26, 1977 (age 47); Goiânia, Brazil
- Genres: Samba, choro, jazz, valse
- Occupation(s): Musician, songwriter, composer, producer, arranger
- Instrument: 7-string guitar
- Years active: 1983–present
- Website: http://www.rogeriocaetano.com

Rogerio Caetano (born Goiânia, September 26, 1977) is a Brazilian musician, arranger, musical producer and composer. Bachelor of Music in Composition by the University of Brasília, he is an awarded virtuoso and international reference in 7 string guitar. Using a revolutionary language, within the choro and samba music genres and mixing jazz elements, he represents a new school for this instrument.

He has a method for the instrument and a discography with 11 albums, being awarded in 2016 in the Brazilian Music Awards. In 2015 and 2019 he was awarded the IMA (Independent Music Awards), Best Instrumentalists 2015/Embrulhador, and 2017 and 2021, in the Music Pro Awards.

His partners include Yamandu Costa, Hamilton de Holanda, Daniel Santiago, Marco Pereira, Eduardo Neves, Celsinho Silva, Luís Barcelos, Gian Correa, Cristovão Bastos, and Coletivo Choro na Rua.

He has been promoting his art in Brazil and abroad, performing concerts in countries such as Germany, France, Italy, Spain, Austria, Portugal, Holland, Belgium, USA, China, India, Israel, Turkey, South Africa, and Ecuador.

He has recorded with artists such as Zeca Pagodinho, Paulinho da Viola, Arlindo Cruz, Beth Carvalho, Caetano Veloso, Monarco, Dona Ivone Lara, Maria Bethânia, Nana Caymmi, Ivan Lins, Alcione, Zélia Duncan, Diogo Nogueira, Teresa Cristina, among many others.

In partnership with Marco Pereira, Rogerio Caetano wrote the "SETE CORDAS, TÉCNICA E ESTILO" method, a work that deeply addresses the language of the 7-string guitar, mainly in the universe of choro and samba.

Also participated as protagonist of the series / documentary Sete Vidas em Sete Cordas that has been exhibited with great success in the Canal Brasil and TV Cultura.

In 2021, his album Cristovão Bastos e Rogério Caetano (with Cristóvão Bastos) was nominated for the Latin Grammy Award for Best Instrumental Album.

== Discography ==
- Abre Alas, Brasilia Brasil. Hamilton de Holanda, Daniel Santiago, Rogério Caetano. 2001
- Pitando o Sete. Rogério Caetano. 2004
- Rogério Caetano. 2009.
- Yamandu Costa & Rogério Caetano. 2012
- Só Alegria. Celsinho Silva, Eduardo Neves, Luis Barcelos, Rogério Caetano. 2013
- Rogério Caetano e Eduardo Neves. Cosmopolita. 2016
- Rogério Caetano Convida. 2017.
- Rogério Caetano e Gian Correa, 7. 2018
- Cristóvão Bastos e Rogério Caetano. 2020
- Brasília Brasil Trio Ao Vivo. 2020
- Rogério Caetano Solo. 2021

== Productions ==
- Tocata à Amizade. 2015. Yamandu Costa, Rogério Caetano, Alessandro Kramer, Luis Barcelos.
- Um abraço no Raphael Rabello, 50 anos. 2012.
- Obrigado Zé da Velha. 2023. Coletivo Choro na Rua.

== Awards ==
- IMA (Independent Music Awards) 2015
- Best Instrumentalists 2015 - Embrulhador
- 27th Brazilian Music Awards, 2016
- Music Pro Awards 2017
- Music Pro Awards 2018
- Best Instrumental Group and Best New Album (2024 Brazilian Music Award, Coletivo Choro na Rua).
