= Cristovão Bastos =

Brazilian musician, songwriter and arranger

- Born: Cristovão da Silva Bastos Filho; December 3, 1946 (age 79); Rio de Janeiro, Brazil
- Genre: MPB
- Occupations: Singer, musician, songwriter
- Instrument: Piano
- Years active: 1970s–present

Cristovão da Silva Bastos Filho (born December 3, 1946) is a Brazilian songwriter, pianist and arranger. He has performed and composed for artists including Maria Bethânia, Milton Nascimento, Gal Costa, Ivan Lins, Barbra Streisand, Dionne Warwick and Paulinho da Viola. Bastos has been nominated for a Latin Grammy and has won 6 Brazilian Music Awards.

== Work ==
Bastos has been active as a songwriter, arranger and pianist since the 1970s. In 1992, he released "Bons Encontros", his first album as a primary artist along with Marco Pereira. In 1996, he released his first solo album, "Avenida Brasil".

Bastos was the pianist and arranger for Dionne Warwick's 1994 album "Aquarela do Brasil", a collection of Brazilian jazz and pop standards.

Barbra Streisand's 1999 song "Let's Start Right Now" is set to the music of "Raios de Luz", written by Bastos and Abel Silva.

In 2006, Bastos composed the soundtrack for the film “Zuzu Angel”, directed by Sérgio Rezende.

== Awards and honors ==
Bastos' album "Cristovão Bastos e Rogério Caetano" was nominated for the Latin Grammy Award for Best Instrumental Album at the 22nd Annual Latin Grammy Awards.

Together with Marco Pereira, Bastos won the 1994 Brazilian Music Awards (also known as the Sharp Awards) for Best Instrumental Album for their album "Bons Encontros". His song "Tua Cantiga", co-written and performed by Chico Buarque, was awarded the 2018 Brazilian Music Awards for Best Song.

As arranger, Bastos received Sharp prizes for his work with Paulinho da Viola (1990), Parceria (1995), Disfarça e Chora (1996), and Tantos Caminhos (1997).

== Personal life ==
Bastos was married to Amelia Rabello.

== Discography ==
- Bons Encontros (1992)
- Avenida Brasil (1996)
- Interpreta Tom Jobim (1999)
- Cristovão Bastos e Rogério Caetano (2020)
