= Hui Bu Hui =

"Hui Bu Hui (Will We)"

Single by Yang Kun

from the album I Really Care (真的很在乎)
- Released: October 13, 2011
- Genre: pop; Mandopop; Soft rock
- Length: 4:35
- Songwriters: Roxanne Seeman; Fredrik Samsson; Tobias Forsberg; Cui Shu - Mandarin lyrics
- Producer: Zhang Yadong

Music video
- "Hui Bu Hui (Will We)" on YouTube

"Hui Bu Hui (Will We)" is a song by Chinese singer Yang Kun, and introduced in the 2011 Chinese suspense thriller Lost in Panic Cruise. The song was written by Roxanne Seeman, Fredrik Samsson and Tobias Forsberg. The Mandarin title and lyrics Hui Bu Hui 会不会 were written by Cui Shu. The recording was produced by Zhang Ya Dong. "Hui Bu Hui (Will We)" was released on October 13, 2011, as the first single from Yang Kun's album "I Really Care (真的很在乎)".

Hui Bu Hui (Will We) is the theme song accompanied by promo music video for the mainland China hit thriller Lost in Panic Cruise, the sequel to Lost in Panic Room. Yang Kun, actor and singer, appears in Lost in Panic Cruise and in the accompanying music video. The movie premiered in Mainland China on October 27, 2011. Kun performed the song at the movie's press conference on October 14, 2011.

== Background ==
Yang Kun's appearance as an actor in the film was his first performance on screen. The role he played in the film was as a psychopathic criminal. The writing and production of the movie theme song Hui Bu Bui was a departure from Yang Kun's usual style, as it was the first time that he was not involved in the writing and creation of the song and the first time that he interpreted a work not his own. Whereas his style as a singer was familiar to his audience for its unique and distinctive emotional expression and introverted characteristics, his performance in the film was described as fierce.

== Composition, lyrics, and production style ==
The song was produced by Zhang Yadong, known as China's "Golden Producer", in a pop style. It was written by American songwriter Roxanne Seeman, Swedish producer/writer Fredrik Samsson, and Swedish songwriter Tobias Forsberg. Mandarin lyrics were written by Cui Shu.

== Cover version ==
An English version of the song by the Swedish band Calle & The Undervalleys was released with the title "Face to Face".

== Critical response ==
Guangzhou Daily wrote that Yang kun performed the song at the movie's premiere, praising the moving lyrics and commenting on the audience's instant reaction.
