= When Love Calls Your Name =

Single by Elhaida Dani

from the album Elhaida Dani
- Released: 2013
- Recorded: 2013
- Genre: Pop
- Length: 3:42
- Label: Universal Music Italia Srl
- Songwriters: Riccardo Cocciante & Roxanne Seeman
- Producer: Riccardo Cocciante

Music video
- "When Love Calls Your Name (Live The Voice of Italy, Milano) on YouTube

"When Love Calls Your Name" is a song by Albanian singer Elhaida Dani, written by Richard Cocciante and Roxanne Seeman. Dani performed the song as a contestant of The Voice of Italy during the finale episode on May 30, 2013. Upon being announced as winner of the competition, Cocciante joined Dani on stage for a reprise performance of the song. A studio recording of the song was issued as a single by Universal Music Italia, followed by inclusion in Dani's self-titled album release.

On July 2, 2013, Universal Music Italia released Dani's 7-song EP, including both the studio single recording and the live performance version of "When Love Calls Your Name".

When Love Calls Your Name is track 5 on The Voice of Italy - The Originals released on May 30, 2013, by Universal Music.

== Overview ==
Originally from Tirana, Albania, Elhaida Dani entered and won singing competitions Star Academy Albania, Top Fest and Festivali i Këngës. At 19, she auditioned for The Voice of Italy and became a member of Team Cocciante. For the finale episode, Cocciante gave her the song When Love Calls Your Name, which she performed and won, becoming the winner of the first series of the show, with over 70% of the votes. A videoclip of the recording session for "When Love Calls Your Name" by Elhaida Dani with Riccardo Cocciante, "Coach" (Judge") and producer, was posted at the Rai Television site, and the song was made available at iTunes Italy for voters.

Cocciante later commented on the song saying it was "a rough stone that Elhaida transformed into a diamond".

== Zendee version ==
Zendee Rose Tenerefe, known mononymously as "Zendee", a Filipina singer who rose to prominence after a video of her singing a karaoke version of Whitney Houston's "I Will Always Love You" went viral on YouTube., recorded "When Love Calls Your Name" on her album "Z", released by MCA Music Universal Philippines on August 7, 2015.
