= Caught in that Feeling =

2008 song performed by Daniel Lindström

"Caught In That Feeling"

Single by Daniel Lindstrom

from the album D-Day
- B-side: "Caught In That Feeling (acoustic version)"
- Released: December 12, 2008
- Genre: Pop; electronic; house; trance
- Length: 3:52
- Label: Laluff
- Songwriters: Daniel Lindstrom; Roxanne Seeman; Fredrik Samsson
- Producers: Fredrik Samsson; Moh Denebi

Daniel Lindstrom singles chronology
""Saturday Night"" (2008)	"Caught In That Feeling" (2008)	""I Know Nothing"" (2012)

Music video
- "Caught In That Feeling" on YouTube

"Caught In That Feeling" is a song by Swedish singer-songwriter Daniel Lindstrom, released on December 12, 2008, through independent Swedish label Laluff Music Production and distributor Playground Music Scandinavia as the second single from his third studio album D-Day (2008). It was produced by Fredrik Samsson and Mohammed Denebi. Samsson co-wrote the joint song with Lindstrom and American songwriter Roxanne Seeman.

The single release included an acoustic version. Radio remix and Club remix versions were released in August 2009 as Caught in That Feeling the Remix by Daniel Lindstrom feat Flow Vibe.

Lindstrom performed Caught in That Feeling at the Future Gala 2018 at the Vasa Theatre in Stockholm.

Filipino singer Jason Dy performed Caught In That Feeling during the All Star Cast Finale Episode of the second season of The Voice of the Philippines upon winning the competition. A studio recording of the song was released on March 30, 2015, through UMUSIC Philippines as the lead single from his eponymous album Jason Dy.

== Background ==
Roxanne Seeman was visiting the studio of Moh Denebi in Stockholm, where she met Fredrik Samsson. Samsson gave Seeman a CD of songs, including one unfinished song with the vocals of Daniel Lindstrom. Upon returning to Los Angeles, Seeman listened to the songs and called Samsson inquiring after the unfinished song and the singer. Samsson replied that it was Daniel Lindstrom, winner of the first Swedish Pop Idol season, and invited Seeman to write with them for Lindstrom's upcoming album, which Samsson and Denebi were producing. Seeman returned to Stockholm and wrote "Caught In That Feeling" with Fredrik Samsson and Daniel Lindstrom at Samsson's studio.

== Style ==
The song was recorded during the D-Day album sessions using the latest technology of the time, mixing live sessions with synths to get both a retro feel and a current sound. Samsson explained "It is not so common to do so today. I've never done that before. It has been like baking a nice cake."

== Credits and personnel ==
- Daniel Lindstrom - vocals, songwriter
- Fredrik Samsson - producer, songwriter
- Mohammed Denebi - producer
- Per Lindvall - drums
- Andreas Unge - bass
- Jesper Nordenstrom - piano
- Erik Arvinder - string arranger

== Jason Dy version ==
"Caught In That Feeling"

Single by Jason Dy
- Released: March 30, 2015
- Genre: Soul
- Length: 3:31
- Label: UMUSIC Philippines
- Songwriters: Daniel Lindstrom; Roxanne Seeman; Fredrik Samsson
- Producer: Francis Guevarra

Music video
- "Caught In That Feeling" on YouTube

A studio recording of the song was produced by Francis Guevarra and released March 30, 2015 through UMUSIC Philippines as the lead single from Jason Dy's album of the same name. An acoustic version of the song also appears on Dy's eponymous album.

Edray Teodoro and Micka Gorospe performed Caught In That Feeling at a celebration at Robinsons Galleria in Quezon City, Philippines, where Dy received a gold record award from MCA Music for his Jason Dy album.
