= Let's Start Right Now =

"Let’s Start Right Now"
- Promotional Single

Song by Barbra Streisand
- Published: Noa Noa Music, Sony/ATV Music Publishing, Ediçoes Musicais Tapajos, Ltda.
- Released: 1999
- Studio: Sony Scoring Stage
- Length: 4:59
- Label: Sony Entertainment Inc.
- Composers: Cristovão Bastos, Abel Silva
- Lyricist: Roxanne Seeman
- Producer: Barbra Streisand

"Let's Start Right Now" is a song recorded by Barbra Streisand set to the music of the Brazilian song "Raios de Luz" written by Brazilian songwriters Cristovão Bastos and Abel Silva released in 1991 by Simone. Its English lyrics were written by Roxanne Seeman and are unrelated to the original Portuguese-language song.

The song was recorded with a 72-piece orchestra arranged and conducted by Jorge Calandrelli at the Sony Pictures Studio Scoring Stage in 1999, produced by Barbra Streisand during the "A Love Like Ours" album sessions. Humberto Gatica was the recording engineer. Barbra Streisand and Jay Landers are the executive producers of the track.

"Let's Start Right Now" was included as a promotional bonus CD single (Columbia #CSK 43719) in a limited edition of Barbra Streisand's "A Love Like Ours" album (Columbia #CK 63981) sold exclusively at Sam Goody and all U.S. Musicland Group stores.

"Let's Start Right Now" appears as a bonus track on the international CD single release of the Barbra Streisand & Vince Gill duet, "If You Ever Leave Me". Versions of this single were released September - October 1999 with Let's Start Right Now included on the September 13, 1999 in Holland (#667801-2), October 18, 1999 in the UK (#668124-2), and Australia (EP CD 667914–2) releases.

== Raios de Luz ==
"Raios de Luz" (sometimes written as Raio de Luz) is the original Portuguese-language song by Simone, cited by producer Quincy Jones as "one of the world's greatest singers". The music is composed by Cristóvão Bastos with lyrics written by Abel Silva. It is the first track on Simone's "Raio de Luz" album, produced by Marco Mazzola, and released by Columbia in 1991. The song is noted for its theme of romantic love and passion, frequent in Simone's repertoire. Raios de Luz was included again in Sou Eu, in 1993.

Raios de Luz by Simone was the theme song of the TV series Of Body And Soul (De Corpo e Alma). It also appeared in Xou da Xuxa.

=== Personnel ===
- Simone - vocals, co-producer, music director
- Cristovão Bastos - arranger, piano
- Chiquinho de Moraes - string arranger
- Dener de Castro Campolina - contrabass
- Ricardo Raymundo - contrabass
- Alfredo Vidal - violin
- Carlos Eduardo Hack - violin
- Giancarlo Pareschi - violin
- João Daltro de Almeida - violin
- José Alves da Silva - violin
- Michel Bessler - violin
- Paschoal Perrota - violin
- Walter Hack - violin
- Alceu de Almeida Reis - cello
- Jorge Kundert Ranevsky (Iura) - cello
- Arlindo Figueiredo Penteado - viola
- Geraldo Augusto da Costa Monte - viola
- Jesuína Noronha Passaroto - viola
- Maria Léa Magalhães - viola

=== Production ===
- Mazzola - producer
- Antonio Foguete – production assistant
- Impressão Digital Studios (RJ), recording studio
- Marcelo Sabóia – recording engineer
- Rogério (Bigin), Geraldo (Ya Ya), Marcelo (Load) - assistant recording engineering
- Mazzola – mixing
- Keith Rose - assistant mixer
- Mike Fuller, Fullersound Inc. - master engineering
- Carlos Nunes - art direction
- Garrido - photography

== Jermaine Jackson version ==
May 19, 2003, Jermaine Jackson performed "Let's Start Right Now" live on-camera on "The View (U.S. TV series)" talk show, introduced by Barbara Walters.

== Other versions ==
The Brazilian singer Leila Maria released "Let's Start Right Now" on her album "Off Key" initially released in Brasil by Rob Digital. It was released in Germany by ZYX Music. Cristovão Bastos, the composer of the song, arranged and played piano on the recording.
