= Christopher Greenbury =

British film editor

Christopher Greenbury (September 24, 1951 – January 4, 2007) was an English film editor with more than thirty film credits dating from 1979's The Muppet Movie. With Tariq Anwar, he won the BAFTA Award for Best Editing for American Beauty (1999), which he was also nominated for an Academy Award for Best Film Editing. American Beauty is a serious drama, but in general Greenbury edited comedy films, including six directed by the Farrelly brothers commencing with 1994's Dumb and Dumber.

Greenbury was a member of the American Cinema Editors (ACE).

== Filmography ==
Based on Greenbury's filmography at the Internet Database. The director and release date of each film are indicated in parentheses.

Editor

Year	Film	Director	Notes
1979	Survival Run	Larry Spiegel	
1979	The Muppet Movie	James Frawley	
1980	Where the Buffalo Roam	Art Linson	
1981	Liar's Moon	David Fisher	
1982	Some Kind of Hero	Michael Pressman	First collaboration with Michael Pressman
1983	Doctor Detroit	Michael Pressman	Second collaboration with Michael Pressman
1983	Smokey and the Bandit Part 3	Dick Lowry	
1984	The Woman in Red	Gene Wilder	Third collaboration with Gene Wilder
1985	The Heavenly Kid	Cary Medoway	
1986	Haunted Honeymoon	Gene Wilder	Fourth collaboration with Gene Wilder
1987	Three for the Road	Bill L. Norton	
1989	Options	Camilo Vila	
1991	The Naked Gun 2½: The Smell of Fear	David Zucker	
1992	Live Wire	Christian Duguay	
1993	Loaded Weapon 1	Gene Quintano	
1994	Frank and Jesse	Robert Boris	
1994	Dumb and Dumber	Peter Farrelly	First collaboration with the Farrelly brothers
1995	The Baby-Sitters Club	Melanie Mayron	
1996	Bio-Dome	Jason Bloom	
1996	Kingpin	Farrelly brothers	Second collaboration with the Farrelly brothers
1997	Booty Call	Jeff Pollack	First collaboration with Jeff Pollack
1998	There's Something About Mary	Farrelly brothers	Third collaboration with the Farrelly brothers
1999	Lost & Found	Jeff Pollack	Second collaboration with Jeff Pollack
1999	American Beauty	Sam Mendes	
2000	Me, Myself & Irene	Farrelly brothers	Fourth collaboration with the Farrelly brothers
2001	Serendipity	Peter Chelsom	
2001	Shallow Hal	Farrelly brothers	Fifth collaboration with the Farrelly brothers
2003	View from the Top	Bruno Barreto	
2003	Daddy Day Care	Steve Carr	
2003	Stuck on You	Farrelly brothers	Sixth collaboration with the Farrelly brothers
2005	The Pacifier	Adam Shankman	First collaboration with Adam Shankman
2005	Cheaper by the Dozen 2	Adam Shankman	
2006	Gettin' It	Nick Gaitatjis	
2007	Wild Hogs	Walt Becker	Posthumous release

Editorial department

Year	Film	Director	Role	Notes
1973	The Sex Thief	Martin Campbell	Assistant editor	
1975	The Day of the Locust	John Schlesinger	Assistant editor	
1975	The Adventure of Sherlock Holmes' Smarter Brother	Gene Wilder	Assistant editor	First collaboration with Gene Wilder
1977	The World's Greatest Lover	Gene Wilder	Supervising editor	Second collaboration with Gene Wilder
1979	On the Air Live with Captain Midnight	Beverly Sebastian; Ferd Sebastian	Supervising editor	
1981	Chu Chu and the Philly Flash	David Lowell Rich	Additional editor	
2001	Say It Isn't So	J. B. Rogers	Editorial consultant	

Actor

Year	Film	Director	Role
1985	The Heavenly Kid	Cary Medoway	Man with Hot Dog
1987	Three for the Road	Bill L. Norton	Walter

Producer

Year	Film	Director	Credit
1977	The World's Greatest Lover	Gene Wilder	Co-producer
1987	Three for the Road	Bill L. Norton	Associate producer

Thanks

Year	Film	Director	Role	Notes
2007	The Heartbreak Kid	Farrelly brothers	Dedicated to	Seventh collaboration with the Farrelly brothers

== Editing award nominations for American Beauty ==
In addition to winning the BAFTA, the editors of American Beauty were also nominated for the Academy Award for Film Editing, an ACE Eddie Award, the Las Vegas Film Critics Society Award, the Online Film Critics Society Award and the Satellite Award.
