= Abel Silva (writer) =

Brazilian poet, lyricist

- Born: 28 February 1945; Cabo Frio, Rio de Janeiro, Brazil
- Education: Federal University of Rio de Janeiro
- Occupations: Poet; lyricist

Abel Silva (born 28 February 1945) is a Brazilian poet, composer, and lyricist best known for his books of poetry including "Berro em Surdina" and his collaborations as a lyricist with Sueli Costa, João Donato, Dominguinhos, João Bosco, Fagner, Moraes Moreira and Roberto Menescal.

Silva has won two Brazilian Music Awards for his songs "Voz de mulher", co-written with Sueli Costa and recorded by Edson Cordeiro, and "Sempre você", co-written with and recorded by Dominguinhos.

Silva's songs have been recorded by Elis Regina, Simone, Gal Costa, Morais Moreira, Fagner, Emílio Santiago, João Donato, Zizi Possi, Luiz Gonzaga, Nélson Gonçalves and Nara Leão, among others. Silva's lyrics include the Brazilian contemporary standard "Simples Carinho" written to João Donato's melody and harmonized by Donato for the recording by Angela Rô Rô.

Raios de luz, written with Cristóvão Bastos, was first recorded by Simone. It was the theme song for the Brazilian television series De Corpo e Alma and appeared in Xou da Xuxa. In 1999, the song was released by Barbra Streisand, with the English lyrics "Let's Start Right Now"; Festa do interior (performed by Moraes Moreira) had more than 20 recordings outside Brazil.

== Career ==
In the 1970s, Silva was a professor of Brazilian Literature at UFRJ and at the Pontifical Catholic University of Rio de Janeiro. During this time, he was the culture editor for the newspaper "Opinião". In 1975, he launched, with Capinam, the cultural magazine "Anima".

In 2006, a public exhibition of 80 works of art inspired by popular Brazilian songs was displayed at the Paço de São Cristóvão Imperial Palace, Rio de Janeiro. The Brazilian artist Adão Iturrusgarai, a cartoonist and comics artist, contributed his illustration of Abel Silva's lyrics "Simples Carinho" which read "I want to see you / because last night / daydreaming / I slept with you", with a daring design.

== Humanitarian work ==
In 1995, Silva appeared as himself in the documentary Fome Zero a program created by the Brazilian federal government to eradicate hunger and extreme poverty.

Silva, with his song "Simples Carinho", joined the artists contributing to the Abramas Project in donating percentages of their songs to professionals in need affected by the pandemic. In 2020, the first Abramas campaign, called the Humanitarian Artist Campaign, distributed more than 32 tons of food.
