= Heart of Love =

Single by Jamie Bond

from the album The Heavenly Kid (Original Motion Picture Soundtrack)
- Released: 1985
- Studio: Le Gonks West, Los Angeles
- Genre: Pop
- Length: 4:41
- Label: Elektra
- Songwriters: Roxanne Seeman, Billie Hughes
- Producer: George Duke

"Heart of Love", also known by the title "Climbing to the Heart of Love", is a song written by Roxanne Seeman and Billie Hughes. It was recorded by Joni Paladin, under the pseudonym Jamie Bond, and produced by George Duke for the soundtrack to the film The Heavenly Kid. It appears in a montage scene with Bobby (Lewis Smith) and Emily (Jane Kaczmarek). The song was released as the first single in 1985 by Elektra Records.

While the single received airplay in 1985, six years later in 1991, as reported by Shelly Weiss in Cashbox, "Heart Of Love" MJQ Majic 102.5, Buffalo, Program Director Hank Nevins caught the movie on HBO and put the song on the air. The sensational reaction of listeners from Buffalo, Rochester, and Toronto moved "Heart Of Love" into power rotation. MJQ received overwhelming requests from record stores in Canada and the U.S. wishing to buy the disc.

== Production ==
- George Duke - Producer, Executive-Producer
- Erik Zobler - Recording Engineer
- Errol Sober - Music Supervisor
- Recording Studio – Le Gonks West
- Mixed At – Lion Share Recording Studios
- Mastered At – Bernie Grundman Mastering
- Mastered By – Brian Gardner

Pressed By – Allied Record Company

== Other versions ==
- Billie Hughes
- Melissa Manchester, If My Heart Had Wings, 1995, produced by Ron Nevison, Arif Mardin, executive producer

== Critical reception ==
Billboard gave a "Recommended Pick" which said: "Ballad from the "Heavenly Kid" soundtrack; fans of Whitney Houston should take note of a comparable talent."

William Ruhlmann, writing for AllMusic, described the songs on "If My Heart Had Wings": "Melissa Manchester's first album of new material in a decade was filled with big, dramatic ballads and widescreen production values."
