= Cica Zhou =

Chinese actress and model

- 周韦彤
- Cica Zhou in April 2014 at the Beijing International Film Festival.
- Born: Zhou Na (周娜); 26 August 1982 (age 44); Qiandongnan Miao and Dong Autonomous Prefecture, Guizhou, China
- Education: Beijing Newface Model School
- Occupations: Actress, model
- Years active: 2003-present
- Agent: Wonderful Music Co. Ltd. (2013-)
- Notable work: The Princess; Single No More; Silent Witness
- Spouse: Lin Didi (m. 2007–2010)
- Modeling information
- Height: 1.75 m (5 ft 9 in)
- Hair color: Black
- Eye color: Black

Cica Zhou (simplified Chinese: 周韦彤; traditional Chinese: 周韋彤; pinyin: Zhōu Wěitóng; born 26 August 1982) is a Chinese actress and model of Sui ethnicity.

== Early life ==
Zhou was born and raised in Qiandongnan Miao and Dong Autonomous Prefecture, Guizhou. She graduated from Beijing Newface Model School.

== Career ==
Zhou began her career as a fashion model in Beijing at age 17. In 2000, Zhou won the 6th China Model Star Contest and was rated as one of China's top 10 professional models in 2000-01.

Zhou made her acting debut in Spring in the Summer (2004), playing Miao Ge.

Zhou's first film role was uncredited appearance in the film My Crazy Father (2005). That same year, she also had a minor role as Liu Man in True Love of Heaven and Earth.

In 2009, Zhou had a supporting role in Welcome to Shama Town, an adventure film starring Sun Honglei and Lin Chi-ling.

After playing minor roles in various films and television series, Zhou received her first leading role in the horror film Lost In Panic Cruise.

In 2012, Zhou co-starred with Kimi Qiao, Francis Ng and Lam Suet in Good-for-Nothing Heros as Lucy.

In 2013, Zhou participated in Silent Witness as Yang Dan, alongside Sun Honglei, Deng Jiajia, Tong Liya, Yu Nan, and Aaron Kwok.

== Personal life ==
Zhou was married to a Taiwanese businessman Lin Didi (Chinese: 林狄迪) in 2007. The couple divorced in 2010.

== Filmography ==
=== Film ===
Year	Title	Chinese title	Role	Notes
2005	My Crazy Father	大荒野	Zhao Lan	
2006	Love in Memory	爱的是你	Xin Yu	
2010	The Love Clinic	爱情维修站	Chen Xiaofang	
2010	After 80s	80后	Xing Chen's mother	
2010	Welcome to Shama Town	决战刹马镇		
2011	Single No More	光棍终结者	Ke Ke	
2011	Lost in Panic Cruise	密室之不可靠岸	Zhu Di	
2011	Zombie-108	Z-108弃城		
2012	Good-for-Nothing Heros	请叫我英雄	Lucy	
2013	Yellow Emperor	轩辕大帝	Leizu	
2013	Silent Witness	全民目击	Yang Dan	
2014	Husband and Wife Game	夫妻游戏		
2014	Urban Games	城市游戏	Ma Jia	
2014	Are You Ready to Marry Me	我想结婚的时候你在哪		
2015	Love Without Distance	土豪520		
2016	Love Studio	同城邂逅		
2016	Xuan Yuan the Great Emperor	轩辕大帝		

=== Television ===
Year	Title	Chinese title	Role	Notes
2004	Spring in the Summer	夏日里的春天	Miao Ge	
2005	True Love of Heaven and Earth	天地真情	Liu Man	
2006	25ans	朋友的朋友是朋友		
2010		安与安寻	Bai Keke	
2013	People's Princess	全民公主	He Min	
2014	Advance Toward Happiness	向着幸福前进	An Qi	
2014	Never Give Up Dodo	钱多多炼爱记		
2014	The Four Cute Constables	四大萌捕	Chaser	

== Photo album ==
- Cica loves YOU! – ISBN 978-4087805819, Shueisha.
- Loving, Cica
