= The Heavenly Kid =

- Theatrical release poster
- Directed by: Cary Medoway
- Written by: Cary Medoway; Martin Copeland
- Produced by: Mort Engelberg
- Starring: Lewis Smith; Jane Kaczmarek; Jason Gedrick; Richard Mulligan
- Cinematography: Steven Poster
- Edited by: Christopher Greenbury
- Music by: Kennard Ramsey; Roxanne Seeman
- Distributed by: Orion Pictures
- Release date: July 26, 1985
- Running time: 90 minutes
- Country: United States
- Language: English
- Box office: $3.9 million

The Heavenly Kid is a 1985 American romantic comedy fantasy film directed by Cary Medoway and starring Lewis Smith, Jason Gedrick, Jane Kaczmarek and Richard Mulligan.

== Plot ==
In the early 1960s, young greaser-type rebel Bobby Fontana challenges Joe Barnes to a game of chicken for making a pass at his girlfriend Emily. Bobby wins the race easily when Joe dives out of his car, but he himself is unable to get out of the car in time due to his bracelet getting caught on the gearshift. He dies as his car plummets over the cliff into a fiery wreck.

Bobby awakens to find himself aboard a speeding train, which stops at a station housing a huge escalator going up into a bright white light, which one of the attendants refers to as "Uptown" (Heaven). He is denied access to the escalator, and Rafferty appears and explains that he is not yet considered ready and needs to carry out an "assignment" in order to earn his ticket Uptown. Until then, he has to stay on a train in "Midtown" (Purgatory), where he meets people from different eras.

After many years, Rafferty takes Bobby back to Earth and gives him his assignment: he is to act as a guardian angel and friend for Lenny Barnes, a promising high school student who is constantly picked on in school, particularly by school bullies Fred Gallo and Bill McIntyre. However, Bobby is instructed that he is only allowed to reveal himself to Lenny and nobody else.

Bobby helps Lenny by giving him a makeover, assisting him in dealing with Fred and Bill, and helping him win the affection of the hottest girl in school, Sharon. However, Bobby comes to realize that the new lifestyle Lenny is leading is not noble, as it causes him to rebel against everyone, including his parents and long-time friend Melissa.

Bobby discovers that Lenny's mother is Emily, his former girlfriend, and is married to Joe, the man he was racing when he died. Bobby breaks the rules and reveals himself to Emily to confess his love for her, and she informs him that he is Lenny's father.

In a scene reminiscent of the opening sequence, Lenny is challenged to a race of chicken at the local quarry by Fred, Sharon's former boyfriend. Having been told by Rafferty that Lenny will die just as Bobby did earlier, Bobby offers to trade his own chance to move Uptown (essentially, his own immortal soul) to save Lenny's life.

Much like Bobby's car race, the race ends with Lenny flying over the edge of a cliff, and the car exploding in a fiery wreck. However, Bobby appears in Lenny's car, prevents him from dying, and helps him climb up the cliff. Bobby helps Lenny see the error of his ways as Lenny reunites with Melissa.

After bidding an emotional goodbye to Lenny, during which he tells him that they will always be best friends, Bobby offers himself to Rafferty to fulfill his end of the bargain by accepting a ride "Downtown" (Hell).

However, Rafferty explains that this will not be happening. Bobby incredulously asks why, since he had made a deal to trade his own soul for Lenny's second chance at life. Rafferty explains to Bobby that he had learned to love and value someone more than himself, and that is how one earned a ticket Uptown. They fly into the sky on a motorbike, and Bobby boards the escalator to Uptown.

== Cast ==
- Lewis Smith as Bobby Fontana
- Jason Gedrick as Lenny Barnes
- Jane Kaczmarek as Emily Barnes
- Richard Mulligan as Rafferty
- Mark Metcalf as Joe Barnes
- Beau Dremann as McIntyre
- Stephen Gregory as Fred Gallo
- Anne Sawyer as Sharon
- Nancy Valen as Melissa
- Chad Wiggins-Grady as Jerry
- Scott Stone as Frank
- Rooney Kerwin as Suburbanite
- Will Knickerbocker as Max
- Harold Bergman as Mr. Finley
- Donna Rosae as Boulevard Girl
- Barney Johnston as Platform Official
- Lit Gonnah as Bag Lady
- Bill Ash as Older Official
- Willie Woods as Vendor
- Jody Sharlow as Surfer
- David Stidham as Slick Salesman
- Kevin L. Clarit as Grease Jockey
- T.R. Durphy as Drug Dealer
- Debra Gallagher as Plain Girl
- Lynne Griffin as Waitress
- Stacy Koolick as Student
- Christopher Greenbury as Man Eating Hot Dog

== Reception ==
Metacritic, which uses a weighted average, assigned the film a score of 30 out of 100, based on 6 critics, indicating "generally unfavorable" reviews. On the review aggregator website Rotten Tomatoes, the film holds a 30% approval rating based on 10 critics. The film won Best Family Motion Picture at the 7th Youth in Film Awards.

Candace Russell wrote in the Fort Lauderdale News, "this sweet romantic comedy succeeds even though it follows a predictable course, with credit due to the straightforward credible performances, likable characters and a pleasant retooling of the idea that one can tamper with destiny." Film critic Paul Attanasio opined that "everything about The Heavenly Kid is ripped off, from a sprig of music that apes the Beverly Hills Cop theme to Gedrick, who was obviously cast because he looks like Tom Cruise, but cheaper."

In her review for The New York Times, Janet Maslin said, "guardian angel movies almost always have a little charm, but The Heavenly Kid has none." She also complained that the director, Cary Medoway, "kept the film visually bland and gave it no sense of humor." Gene Siskel panned the film in the Chicago Tribune, writing that the movie is "teenage summer film trash", and went on to say, "it's a toss-up which kid is less interesting in The Heavenly Kid – the savior (Lewis Smith) or the savee (Jason Gedrick). Neither actor has much personality. And a last-minute grab through a plot twist for some genuine emotion is thrown away for a lack of screen time."

== Soundtrack ==
The film's soundtrack, The Heavenly Kid (Original Motion Picture Soundtrack) was produced by George Duke and consists of ten songs featured in the movie.

=== Track listing ===
Side one
No.	Title	Writer(s)	Performer	Length
1.	"Heartless"	Bruce Gaitsch, Lisa Sennett	Joe Lynn Turner	3:59
2.	"The Heavenly Kid (Out on the Edge)"	George Duke, Randy Goodrum	Jon Fiore	4:09
3.	"Heart of Love"	Billie Hughes, Roxanne Seeman	Jamie Bond	4:36
4.	"Obsession"	David Martin, Greg Guidry	Howard Hewett	4:03
5.	"Cruisin' Tonight"	George Duke, Randy Goodrum	Debra Laws	3:52

Side two
No.	Title	Writer(s)	Performer	Length
1.	"Animal Attraction"	Gloria Sklerov, Lenny Macaluso	Jamie Bond	3:59
2.	"Two Minute Love"	Danny Sembello, Jim McKeever	Mickey Thomas	3:58
3.	"So Mean to Me"	George Duke	The George Duke Band	3:59
4.	"Hamburgers"	George Duke	George Duke	3:41
5.	"When the Children Make the Mighty Fall"	Mick Muhlfreidel	Neko-Meka	4:52

== See also ==
- List of films about angels
