= Hold on to the Good Things =

Song by Shawn Colvin

from the album Stuart Little 2 Original Soundtrack - Music from and Inspired by Stuart Little 2
- Released: July 19, 2002
- Length: 3:30
- Label: Epic Soundtrax
- Songwriters: Holly Knight; Roxanne Seeman
- Producer: Marc Tanner

Music video
- "Hold On To The Good Things" on YouTube

"Hold on to the Good Things" is a song by American singer-songwriter Shawn Colvin appearing in the film Stuart Little 2 as the second end-credit song. It was written by Holly Knight and Roxanne Seeman for the film and included in the soundtrack album, released by Epic Soundtrax, Sony Music, on July 19, 2002.

== Background ==
Bonnie Greenberg and Christy Gerhardt, music supervisors for Stuart Little 2, sent Roxanne Seeman the script for Stuart Little 2, asking whether she would write a song. Roxanne Seeman wrote the song with Holly Knight.

"Hold on to the Good Things" was written for a montage scene in the movie where the family is in the dining room. During a long period of editing where changes were made to scenes in the movie, the recording of the song was put on hold. The song was chosen out of 100 songs and recorded by Shawn Colvin with Marc Tanner producing, the week the film locked and placed as the second end-credit song, following Celine Dion's "I'm Alive".

== Writing and composition ==
The song is written in the key of B-flat major with a lively, swing tempo. The lyrics are uplifting and reassuring, following the movie's themes of friendship and love.

After Glen Brunman of Sony Music Soundtrax heard "Hold on to the Good Things", the lyrics in the chorus were revised: the words "silvery lining" from the last line of the second verse going into the chorus, was repeated as "silver lining" in the second line of the chorus, replacing "kindness".

During the recording session, Shawn Colvin recorded both lyric versions. The original unedited version was used in the film. An edited version with the lyric revision in the chorus appears on the soundtrack. Ken Karman was the music editor of the film.

== Critical reception ==
Reviewing the Stuart Little 2 soundtrack William Ruhlmann of All Music described the song's "sunny sentiments".

== Credits and personnel ==
Credits adapted from album's liner notes.

Personnel

- Shawn Colvin – vocals
- Marc Tanner – production
- Kim Richey – background vocals
- Craig Stull –guitar
- Jebin Bruni –keyboards
- Lance Morrison– bass guitar
- Matt Laug – drums, percussion
- Marc Greene – engineer
- Chris Holmes– engineer
- Gina Fant-Saez– engineer
- David Thoener – mixing engineer
- Jeff Rothschild – mixing engineer
- Dave Donnelly – mastering
- Douglas Wick, Lucy Fisher, Rob Minkoff – Executive producers
