= Simone Bittencourt de Oliveira =

Simone
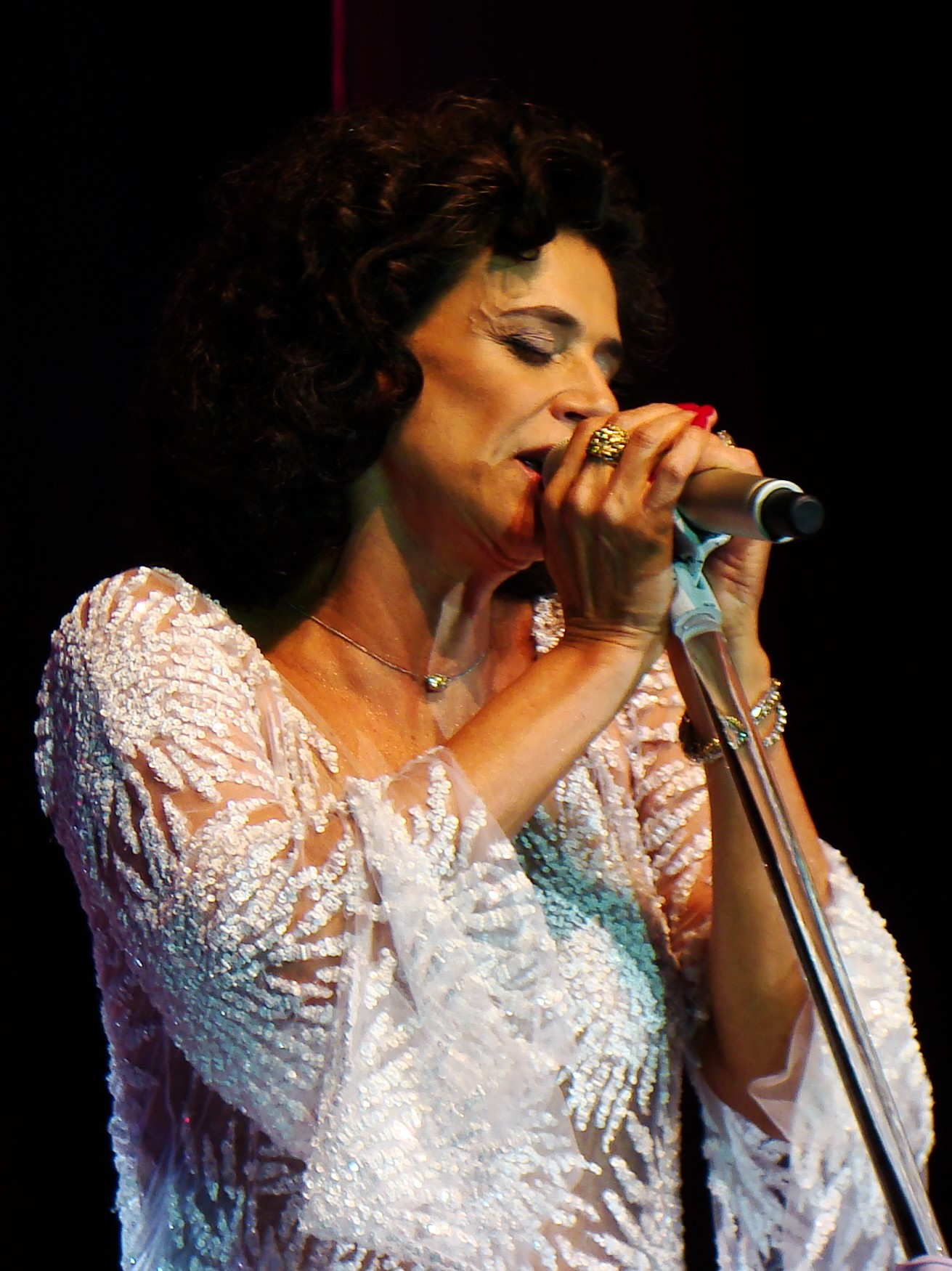
- Simone in 2009

Background information
- Also known as: Cigarra (Cicada, Buzzer)
- Born: Simone Bittencourt de Oliveira; December 25, 1949 (age 76); Salvador, Bahia, Brazil
- Genres: Romantic, MPB, samba
- Occupation: Singer
- Years active: 1973–present
- Labels: Odeon, EMI, Universal
- Website: www.Simone.art.br

Simone Bittencourt de Oliveira (born December 25, 1949), better known as Simone, is a Brazilian singer of Música Popular Brasileira (MPB) who has recorded more than 30 albums.

== Biography ==
Simone was born on December 25, 1949, in Salvador, Bahia, as the seventh daughter in a family of nine children. During her teenage years, she was a professional basketball player and moved to São Paulo to become a member of the women's national basketball team. She studied in Santos, São Paulo, majoring in physical education.

== Career ==
Her music career began when a close friend and guitar teacher Elodir Barontini invited her to sing at a dinner with Odeon's marketing manager. At the end of this encounter, specially scheduled for her performance, came an offer of a contract to record not one but four albums at once. Her eponymous debut album was recorded in October 1972 at a low cost and with a few musicians, conducted by José Biamonte. It circulated only among friends, relatives, and artists; ten years later it would be re-edited and with a different cover. On March 20, 1973, Simone was launched for the press in a closed meeting at the Hilton Hotel in São Paulo; later on, she would appear for the first time on a TV program, for TV Bandeirantes. This was followed by an appearance on Mixturação (director/producer Walter Silva, April 1973), a TV Record program where she was one of the promising new talents. Thus, success gradually took place.

When she transitioned from sports to stage performance, she was supported by her father, an amateur opera singer, and her mother, a pianist. Early in her musical career, she was invited to participate in an international tour, starting with a presentation at the Olympia in Paris. This tour was organized by Hermínio Bello de Carvalho, a major record producer in Brazil. They performed at Olympia, Madison Square Garden in New York City, Belgium, and Canada with great success, launching two albums, Brasil Export 73 and Festa Brasil. Both were produced by Hermínio Bello, who would also produce the next two albums, Quatro Paredes and Gotas D'Água, the last with Milton Nascimento's production.

=== Shows and TV festivals ===
By 1977, she reached national recognition in Brazil, notably with Jura Secreta, Face a Face and O Que Será. The last, composed by Chico Buarque, was featured in the soundtrack of the film Dona Flor and Her Two Husbands, by Bruno Barreto, which helped to popularize the music. The same year, she also met Chico Buarque at the studio and said, "O Que Será opened doors for me and my career."

From June 16 to September 15, 1978, she was among artists of the Projeto Pixinguinha that traveled around the country with upcoming new singers. An excerpt from the Projeto comments on her success:

In 1977, beyond launching 'Face a Face' and the Dona Flor and Her Two Husbands soundtrack, she was acclaimed in a spectacle at the Museu de Arte Moderna. At the Teatro Clara Nunes, directed by Hermínio Bello de Carvalho, she presented "Face a Face". She is improving her performance in each spectacle and is featured now among Brazil's best singers. She has just recorded "Cigarra", singing Gonzaguinha's "Petúnia Resedá" as well as songs by Fagner and Abel Silva ("Sangue e Pudins"), Milton Nascimento and Ronaldo Bastos ("Cigarra").

A performance in 1977 was also claimed to be one of her best. (Excerpt by Funarte): "Along with Belchior, young Simone brought crowds to João Caetano theatre for her Seis e Meia performance on August 25, 1977, and was highly acclaimed when singing 'Gota D'Água'; Seis e Meia marked her first national recognition."

Two years later, on December 12, 1979, her next LP Pedaços was launched at Canecão Rio de Janeiro; it was positively received by critics and drew over 120,000 attendees for the album tour. Pedaços gave her her first golden disc.

=== The largest album seller of the 1980s ===
According to Revista Veja (Brazil's largest weekly news magazine): "Simone Bittencourt de Oliveira was born twice. The first time, in 1949, in a lower-class Salvador area, in Bahia. The second time was last February 7 at the 'Morumbi Stadium', in São Paulo, when she raised a vibrant chorus of 90,000 at the 'Canta Brasil' spectacle, singing 'Caminhando'. When her presentation ended, she was another shining star in the sky." She recorded her career's first golden disc and an eponymous program for Rede Globo, recorded live at the 'Globo Theater' (March 1980). The program, Simone Bittencourt de Oliveira, was the first of a series called Grandes Nomes. Also in 1979, she was present at the Festival de Música Popular Brasileira, interpreting Para Lennon & McCartney (by Márcio and Lô Borges and Fernando Brant). In 1982, the same magazine would declare Simone to be the largest album seller of the decade on the cover, with seven pages of coverage.

From the 1960s, when the Festival de Música Popular Brasileira series was launched (Rede Record), until the 1980s, Brazilian television broadcast programs from live music festivals. Mulher 80 (Rede Globo) exhibited a series of interviews and musicals discussing women's role in society with an approach to the national music evolution and the predominance of female voices, including Elis Regina, Maria Bethânia, Fafá de Belém, Marina Lima, Simone, Rita Lee, Joanna, Zezé Motta, Gal Costa and Regina Duarte and Narjara Turetta from the Malu Mulher TV series. In an interview given to O Pasquim journal (nº 572, from June 13 to 19, 1980), Elis Regina said about her: "I Like Simone very much. Potentially, there is a talent to bloom out. She is a beautiful woman; her repertoire is very good, and she is very well guided by Flávio Rangel and Nelson Ayres."

At the age of 32, she became the first female singer to fill the Maracanãzinho Stadium. In February 1982, 15,000 to 20,000 people attended Canta Brasil to see her perform music by Milton Nascimento, Ary Barroso, Chico Buarque, Tom Jobim, Fernando Brant, Vítor Martins, Paulo César Pinheiro, Hermínio Bello de Carvalho, Isolda, Sueli Costa and Abel Silva. In December 1983, she drew a crowd of 150,000 people to Quinta da Boa Vista to see a live transmission of Rede Globo for a New Year's TV show.

As her career grew, Simone became increasingly involved in political activities. She helped raise funds with Nordeste já, a Brazilian version of the American charity efforts We are the World or USA for Africa. The 155 choruses of voices recorded a compact disc with two songs of hers, Chega de Mágoa and Seca D'Água.

In May 2006, in a pocket show at Bourbon Street Nightclub in São Paulo, Simone and her band performed for the Credicard Project. Notable recent performances include the ones in Peru, where the audience stood by the stage clapping for more than five minutes straight; and in Miami, along with Ivan Lins. By June 2007, the Coliseum of Santos received an icon of MPB who had once been a resident. Amigo é Casa, sharing the stage with Zélia Duncan, was a show for the recording of an eponymous DVD and aimed to mark the partnership she had with Zélia Duncan for the past two years.

== Repertoire ==
Her repertoire includes some 350 interpretations, one of the largest among Brazilian female singers. The themes of romantic love and passion (Começar de Novo, Jura Secreta, Corpo, Medo de Amar nº2, Raios de luz, and Lenha), samba (O Amanhã, To Voltando, Disputa de Poder, and Ex-amor), and religious songs (Cantos de Maculelê, Reis e rainhas do Maracatu, Então é Natal, Ave Maria, and Jesus Cristo), are the frequent in her work.

During her childhood and teenage years, the main influences on this romantic repertoire were Roberto Carlos, Maysa Matarazzo, Dolores Duran, Ângela Maria, and Nora Ney—names of the samba-canção or fossa (gloom) genre. Samba-canção preceded the bossa nova music style, with which Maysa was associated, and had presented more gentle or soft melodies and interpretations. Maysa's legacy, even with its bossa nova bias, is that of a more dramatic singer and it would be more properly linked to the bolero and samba-canção rhythm. Simone's fondness for boleros results from this musical heritage.

Among her albums recorded after the 1980s, those that stand out include Simone Bittencourt de Oliveira (1995), featuring ballads among other classic and consecrated samba composers; Café com Leite (1996), a tribute to Martinho da Vila; Seda Pura, an incursion into pop (2001) and Baiana da gema, a tribute to Ivan Lins (2004)--works regarded as a reunion of a more refined repertoire and more selective arrangements. Among these is Café com Leite, in which she interprets Martinho da Vila's sambas. Singer and composer Caetano Veloso publicly offered his admiration for this album:

Simone's album of Martinho da Vila's compositions, I find divine, divine and yet it went unheralded... The press acted as if it was nothing special. It is divine. His repertoire fits her very well—that album is the kind I like to listen to at home, alone, together with my favourites. She gave clarity to those compositions, it is beautiful. And it was a project conceived as the recording of a singer perfectly suited to interpret a composer, I don't know how it came to be, but it is beautiful, it is a wonderful result. And she is a great singer, very good, I adore her. A very beautiful voice which makes one feels good.

As an interpreter of others' compositions, Simone has foregrounded Ivan Lins, Vitor Martins, Milton Nascimento, Fernando Brant, Paulo César Pinheiro, Gonzaguinha, Chico Buarque, Martinho da Vila, Fátima Guedes, João Bosco, Aldir Blanc, Isolda, Roberto Carlos, Hermínio Bello de Carvalho, Paulinho da Viola, Sueli Costa and Abel Silva. Her current repertoire includes Zélia Duncan, Cássia Eller, Adriana Calcanhotto, Aldir Blanc, Joyce, Martinho da Vila, Paulinho da Viola, and Zeca Pagodinho.

== "Começar de novo" ==
The song "Começar de novo", from her Pedaços album (1979), stands out for being the theme song of the TV series Malu Mulher (Rede Globo, 1979), a primetime soap opera that involved controversial issues at that time such as women's liberation, divorce, abortion, and domestic violence. The character Malu (played by Regina Duarte) was the first to take birth-control pills on a TV drama. Simone was chosen to interpret it instead of Maria Bethânia, who also sought that distinction. The composition was written especially for the series by Ivan Lins and Vítor Martins.

"Começar de Novo" was also recorded by Barbra Streisand and Sarah Vaughan with English lyrics as "The Island". Because of this interpretation, the North American producer Quincy Jones cites Simone as "one of the world's greatest singers". Alongside Jones, Brad Mehldau, compares her to Sarah Vaughan and Dinah Washington, referring to her "strong identity, passion, and grace". Julio Iglesias has referred to Simone as one of his favourites among Brazilian female singers.

== Bibliography ==
- Travessia: A vida de Milton Nascimento. Maria Dolores. 2006. Rcb Publisher.
- 1985, O ano em que o Brasil recomeçou. Edmundo Barreiros e Pedro Só. 2006. Ediouro Publisher.
- História sexual da MPB. Rodrigo Faour. 2006. Rcb publisher.
- Nada será como antes, a MPB nos anos 70. Ana Maria Bahiana. 2006. Senac Publisher.
- Timoneiro – Perfil Biográfico de Hermínio Bello de Carvalho. Alexandre Pavan. 2006. Casa da Palavra Publisher.
- Toquinho: 40 anos de música. João Carlos Pecci. 2005. RCS Publisher .
- Viver de Teatro – Uma biografia de Flávio Rangel. José Rubens Siqueira. Nova Alexandria Publisher.

== Discography ==
=== EMI ===
- 1973 – Simone
- 1973 – Brasil Export
- 1973 – Expo Som 73 – ao vivo
- 1974 – Festa Brasil
- 1974 – Quatro Paredes
- 1975 – Gotas D'Água
- 1977 – Face a Face
- 1978 – Cigarra
- 1979 – Pedaços
- 1980 – Simone Ao Vivo no Canecão
- 1980 – Simone (Atrevida)

=== Sony BMG / CBS ===
- 1981 – Amar
- 1982 – Corpo e Alma
- 1983 – Delírios e Delícias
- 1984 – Desejos
- 1985 – Cristal
- 1986 – Amor e Paixão
- 1987 – Vício
- 1988 – Sedução
- 1989 – Simone (Tudo por Amor)
- 1991 – Raio de Luz
- 1991 – Simone – Procuro olvidarte (Spanish) (featuring Hernaldo Zúñiga)
- 1993 – Sou Eu
- 1993 – La Distancia (Spanish)
- 1995 – Simone Simone
- 1995 – Dos Enamoradas (Spanish)

=== Universal / Polygram ===
- 1995 – 25 de Dezembro
- 1996 – Café com Leite
- 1996 – 25 de diciembre (Spanish)
- 1997 – Brasil, O Show – Live
- 1998 – Loca (Espanhol)
- 2000 – Fica Comigo Esta Noite
- 2001 – Seda Pura
- 2002 – Feminino – Live

=== EMI ===
- 2004 – Baiana da Gema
- 2005 – Simone ao Vivo

=== Biscoito Fino ===
- Amigo é Casa (CD)
- Amigo é Casa (DVD)

=== EMI ===
- O canto da Cigarra nos anos 70 (CD)

=== Brazilian soap opera theme songs ===
- Um desejo só não basta (Corpo a Corpo) – Sony
- Pensamentos (Explode Coração) – Universal
- Íntimo (Uma Esperança no Ar) – Sony
- Naquela noite com Yoko (Brilhante) – Sony
- Quem é Você (A Próxima Vítima) – Sony
- É festa (Senhora do Destino) – Universal
- Sentimental demais (Laços de Família) – Universal
- Será (Perigosas Peruas) – Sony
- Desafio (Mulheres de Areia) – Sony
- Apaixonada (Pantanal) – Sony
- Então Me Diz (Belíssima) – EMI
- Raios de Luz (De Corpo e Alma) – Sony
- Muito Estranho (Desejos de Mulher) – Universal
- Veneziana (A Lua me Disse) – EMI
- Seu Corpo (Sassaricando) – Sony
- Loca-Crazy (Torre de Babel) – Universal
- Tô Que Tô (Sol de Verão) – Sony
- Anjo de Mim (Anjo de Mim) – Sony
- Em Flor (Roda de Fogo) – Sony
- Amor explícito (Corpo Santo) – Sony
- Carta Marcada (Araponga) – Sony
- Beija, Me Beija, Me Beija (O Amor Está no Ar) – Universal
- Uma Nova Mulher (Tieta) – Sony
- Sob Medida (Os Gigantes) – EMI
- Saindo de Mim (Chega Mais) – EMI
- Medo de Amar nº 2 (Sinal de Alerta) – EMI
- Povo da Raça Brasil (Terras do Sem Fim) – EMI
- Mulher da Vida (Champagne) – Sony
- O Tempo Não Pára (O Salvador da Pátria) – Sony
- Começar de Novo (Malu Mulher) – EMI
- A Outra (Roque Santeiro) – Sony
- Desesperar jamais (Água Viva) – EMI
- Face a Face (O Pulo do Gato) – EMI
- Valsa do Desejo (Força de um Desejo) – Universal
- Mundo Delirante (Elas por Elas) – Sony
- Vento nordeste (Pé de Vento) – EMI
- Existe um céu (Paraíso Tropical) – EMI
- Jura secreta (O Profeta e Memórias de Amor) – EMI
- Cigarra (Cara a Cara) – EMI'
- Ela disse-me assim (Os Imigrantes – Terceira Geração) – EMI
- Então vale a pena (Salário mínimo) – EMI
- O que será (Dona Flor and Her Two Husbands) – EMI
- Enrosco (Paixões Proibidas) – EMI
