= Lost in Panic Cruise =

- Film poster
- Traditional Chinese: 密室之不可靠岸
- Simplified Chinese: 密室之不可靠岸
- Hanyu Pinyin: Mìshì Zhī Búkě Kào'àn
- Directed by: Zhang Fanfan
- Written by: Xiao Yu
- Produced by: Gao Jun
- Starring: Alec Su; Annie Wu; Cica Zhou; Yang Kun; Ni Hongjie
- Cinematography: Chen Ke
- Music by: Cheng Chi; Gao Ying
- Production companies: Beijing Shengshi Huarui Film Investment Management co., LTD; E'mei Film Group
- Distributed by: Beijing Shengshi Huarui Film Investment Management co., LTD
- Release date: October 27, 2011 (China)
- Running time: 98 minutes
- Country: China
- Language: Mandarin
- Box office: >¥10 million

Lost in Panic Cruise is a 2011 Chinese suspense thriller and sequel to the 2010 film Lost in Panic Room. The film was directed by Zhang Fanfan and written by Xiao Yu, starring Alec Su, Annie Wu, Cica Zhou, Yang Kun, and Ni Hongjie. The film was released in China on 27 October 2011.

== Plot ==
Detective novelist Liu Yunfei takes it upon himself to investigate a series of murders on a cruise ship.

== Cast ==
- Alec Su as Liu Feiyun, a detective and reasoning novelist.
- Annie Wu as Han Feifei, Dong Lei's lover.
- Cica Zhou as Zhu Di, Su Jingjing's colleague.
- Yang Kun as Dong Lei, a rich second generation, and Liu Feiyun's best friend.
- Ni Hongjie as Su Jingjing, Dong Lei's wife and Liu Feiyun's first lover.
- Mao Junjie as Xiao Yang, Su Jingjing's colleague.
- Sun Yili as Li Xiaofeng, Liu Feiyun's assistant.
- Gao Jun as the captain.

== Box office ==
It was released in October 2011, and was instantly a huge critical and box office success. It grossed ¥10 million on its opening weekend.

== Soundtrack ==
The theme song for Lost in Panic Cruise is "Hui Bu Hui (Will We)", performed by Yang Kun. The song is a music video and appears in the movie trailer. "Hui Bu Hui (Will We)" is written by Roxanne Seeman, Fredrik Samsson and Tobias Forsberg. Chinese lyrics are by Cui Shu.
