= Sueli Costa =

Brazilian singer and composer (1940–2023)

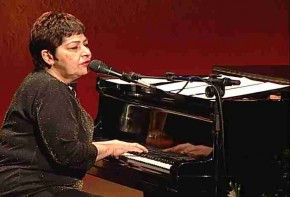
- Costa in 2013
- Born: Sueli Correa Costa; 25 July 1943; Rio de Janeiro, Brazil
- Died: 3 March 2023 (aged 79); Rio de Janeiro, Brazil
- Occupation: Singer
- Musical career
- Genres: MPB

Sueli Correa Costa (25 July 1943 – 3 March 2023) was a Brazilian singer-songwriter and composer.

== Biography ==
Born in Rio de Janeiro into a family of musicians, Costa grew up in Juiz de Fora, started playing the piano at the age of four, and learned to play the guitar by herself at the age of 15. She started her career as a composer in 1960 with the bossa-nova song "Balãozinho", and had her breakout in 1967, composing for Nara Leão the hit song "Por exemplo você". Among artists who recorded songs composed by her were Maria Bethânia, Elis Regina, Raimundo Fagner, Gal Costa, Cauby Peixoto, Ney Matogrosso, Simone, Ivan Lins, Fátima Guedes, Ithamara Koorax, Nana Caymmi, Joanna, Fafá de Belém.

Costa began her professional career as a singer in 1975 with the album Sueli Costa which included the hits "Dentro de Mim Mora um Anjo" and "Coração Ateu". In 1976 she formed a long professional association with lyricist Abel Silva. In 2002, Lucinha Lins honored her with a tribute album, Canção Brasileira, consisting of songs composed by Costa. Her last work was Sueli Costa Convida, a live album recorded in 2018 to celebrate her 50 years of career. Costa died on 4 March 2023, at the age of 79.

== Discography ==
Albums

- Sueli Costa - 1975
- Sueli Costa - 1977
- Vida de artista - 1978
- Louça final - 1980
- Íntimo - 1984
- Minha arte - 2000
- Amor blue - 2007
- Sueli Costa Convida - 2018
