= Lost in Panic Room =

- Traditional Chinese: 密室之不可告人
- Simplified Chinese: 密室之不可告人
- Hanyu Pinyin: Mìshì Zhī Bùkě Gàorén
- Directed by: Zhang Fanfan
- Written by: Xiao Yu
- Produced by: Song Chunyu; Kang Zhenghao
- Starring: Alec Su; Pace Wu; Hu Ming; Jerry Yuan
- Cinematography: Cai Zhenghui
- Edited by: Mao Mao
- Music by: Cheng Chi; Gao Ying
- Production companies: Beijing Shengshi Huarui Film Investment Management co., LTD
- Distributed by: Beijing Shengshi Huarui Film Investment Management co., LTD
- Release date: October 30, 2010 (China)
- Running time: 95 minutes
- Country: China
- Language: Mandarin
- Box office: >¥10 million

Lost in Panic Room is a 2010 Chinese suspense thriller film directed by Zhang Fanfan and written by Xiao Yu. The film stars Alec Su, Pace Wu, Hu Ming, and Jerry Yuan. It was followed by sequel Lost in Panic Cruise. The film was released in China on October 30, 2010.

== Summary ==
Liu Yunfei, a novelist who is well known for writing detective stories, finds himself in the middle of a real-life murder mystery. Using the knowledge gathered while putting together detective narratives, he sets out to help solve the puzzling series of murders that took place in a mountain villa.

== Cast ==
- Alec Su as Liu Yunfei
- Pace Wu as Zhang Hui
- Hu Ming as Li Xiaofeng
- Jerry Yuan as Mike
- Du Junze as Zhuo Ran
- Shi Guanghui as Bai Xiuqing
- Lin Longqi as Lin Quan
- Yang Xiao as Lin Hai
- Li Wanyi as Lin Xiaoyu
- Liu Xiaoxi as Duan Xinyu
- Zhang Yukui as Master Jiang
- Yu Dongjiang as Zhang Siyi

== Box office ==
It grossed ¥10 million on its first weekend.
