= Yang Kun =

Chinese singer-songwriter (born 1972)

- Born: 杨坤 (Yang Kun); 18 December 1972 (age 53); Baotou, Inner Mongolia, China
- Other name: Kane Yang
- Occupations: Singer-songwriter, composer, actor
- Years active: 1993–present
- Television: The Voice of China, I Am a Singer

Chinese name
Transcriptions
Standard Mandarin
- Hanyu Pinyin: Yáng Kūn
Yue: Cantonese
- Jyutping: Joeng4 Kwan1
- Musical career
- Origin: China
- Genres: Mandopop, C-pop, rock
- Instruments: Vocals, guitar
- Labels: Beijing Culture Development, Huayi Brothers, TH Entertainment

Yang Kun (Chinese: 杨坤; pinyin: Yáng Kūn. Born 18 December 1972) is a Chinese singer-songwriter. He was one of the judges of TV talent show The Voice of China during the first and third seasons. He was on the first season of Sing My Song, and was a contestant as one of the seven initial singers on Singer 2019, finishing in fourth place.

== Career ==
=== Early years ===
Yang Kun joined Baotou Steel Company art troupe in 1989. In 1993 Yang went to Beijing to start his musical career. He signed a contract with the record label, Beijing Culture Development. With that company, he released his first album (Indifferent), which turned him into a popular singer. From then on, Yang Kun started being widely known by his husky voice and his melancholic songs. Sadness and aimlessness are some of the emotions that can be found in Yang Kun's songs, which are mostly inspired by his own life experiences.

In 2003, the singer released his second album, entitled That Day, this release was known by the song "The moon represents my heart", in reference to the song of the same name by Teresa Teng, which was a great hit in China. The song also showed Yang's ability to sing love ballads apart from his previous songs. The same year, Yang Kun was prized for first time with a silver medal in the Eastern Billboard Awards ceremony in the category of "Best original song", for his track "Indifferent".

In 2004, Yang, started expanding his influence to other branches of entertainment debuting for first time as an actor in the indie film 13 Months, which was not very successful. In fact, this film has never been released for unknown reasons. Anyway, the popularity of the singer kept on rising and was awarded, once again, in the Eastern Billboard Awards, this time in the category of Most popular Mainland Chinese Male singer.

The third album by Yang Kun, which had the title of 2008, was released in 2005. It had a Pop-Rock style, similar to his previous works, although, this time, the singer incorporated ethnic instruments, and vocals from Inner Mongolia, the region where he was born. Although the sales of this album and his concerts were successful, the singer was not comfortable enough with his record label. That fact also coincided with many personal problems in the life of the performer, who suffered from depression.

=== New projects and as a judge ===
After recovering from his depression, two years later, Yang Kun released his fourth release, Cowboy, under Huayi Brothers. This album was considered by the singer as introspective, with all the songs talking about his recent life and how he tried to find himself. This album was highly promoted by his new company, and many concerts and promotional events for this release were made. During this time, he became friends with new collaborators such as Na Ying and David Huang.

Two years later, in 2009, the performer released a new album featuring a track that is now one of his best-known songs, "Empty city". The popularity of this track was widespread, to the point that has been viewed by over two million users in YouTube. Apart from his usual activities as a singer, Yang Kun not only started appearing in many shows and programmes, but he also returned to the film industry, after an unsuccessful attempt seven years before. In 2011, Yang took part in the film Lost in Panic Cruise, directed by Zhang Fangfang; the movie was a highly successful psychological thriller both critically and commercially. Yang Kun recorded Hui Bu Hui, the theme song for Lost in Panic Cruise.

In 2012, Yang Kun released a new album with the title of I Really Care and took part in the crime thriller movie Lethal Hostage, where he played a drug smuggler.

In July, he became one of the coaches of The Voice of China (now renamed and rebranded to Sing! China), a popular TV show with millions of viewers. During the show's blind auditions, if more than one judge turned alongside Yang Kun, he would try to persuade the contestant to pick himself by telling the contestant that he was holding a concert with 33 stops and that if the contestant picked Yang Kun, the contestant would be invited to come and perform as an additional special guest at the concert. Two years later, he returned to The Voice of China (season 3) once again as a coach with his chosen finalist placing third overall in the competition.

In 2013, he became the host of The Most Beautiful Harmony in the first season and two years later became a coach of the show in season 3.

In 2015, the singer was signed to TH Entertainment, a record label on the rise, where he has been releasing his new songs.

In 2016, Yang Kun was a judge and mentor of Chinese singing competition The Next with Karen Mok, Fei Yu-ching and Hua Chenyu in season 1 along with the addition of Jason Zhang in 2017 for season 2 with his finalists becoming 2nd overall in both seasons.

=== 2019: Participation On Singer 2019 ===
In 2019, Yang Kun returned to television as a contestant on Hunan TV's long-running singing competition Singer 2019 (called I Am a Singer before 2017) along with Liu Huan, Chyi Yu, Wu Tsing-fong, Escape Plan, Zhang Xin and Kristian Kostov as the first seven starting lineup singers where Yang Kun finished fourth in the finals.

Singer 2019 performances and results
| Episode | Song | Original Singer | Percentage | Rank | Result |
|---|---|---|---|---|---|
| Round 1 Qualifier | "I Am More Lonely Than Before" | Yang Kun | 9.01% | 6th | Safe (3rd overall, with 15.95% combined) |
| Round 1 Knockout | "Want To Die, Must Die In Your Hands" | Mo Xizi Shi | 22.90% | 1st | Safe (3rd overall, with 15.95% combined) |
| Round 1 Challenge | "See You Next Crossing" | Li Yuchun | 20.50% | 1st | Safe |
| Round 2 Qualifier | "Passed Love" | Ouyang Feifei | 18.785% | 2nd | Safe (6th overall, with 12.91% combined) |
| Round 2 Knockout | "I Love You" | Yutaka Ozaki | 7.035% | 7th | Safe (6th overall, with 12.91% combined) |
| Round 2 Challenge | "Entertaining Sky" | Eason Chan | 11.615% | 6th | Safe |
| Round 3 Qualifier | "Rejected Play Again" | Leslie Cheung | 15.535% | 3rd | Safe (5th overall, with 14.565% combined) |
| Round 3 Knockouts | "Really Care" | Yang Kun | 13.595% | 4th | Safe (5th overall, with 14.565% combined) |
| Round 3 Challenge | "Growth" | JIHU | 18.030% | 1st | Safe |
| Round 4 Qualifier | "Tamed Elephant" | Tanya Chua | 8.305% | 7th | Safe (This round’s results were deemed void due to Polina Gagarina injury and absence the following round which changed the next round from Knockouts to also Final Challenge round.) |
| Round 4 Knockouts/Challenge | "Back Here Again" | EggPlantEgg | 18.310% | 1st | Safe |
| Breakout Round | Exempt (Due to being one of the seven starting singers who had not been eliminated) | | | | |
| Semi Finals | "Drawing A Heart" Yang Kun's guest singer for this round was A-Lin | Jane Zhang | —N/a | | Safe The top three singers who received the highest count of votes in this round were entitled to a bonus of 10, 20 and 30 votes in the first round of the grand finals. |
| Grand Finals: Round 1 | "Towards The End Of The World" Yang Kun's guest singer for this round was Jason Zhang | Jason Zhang | Advanced Yang Kun lost in the first round, however he was saved by public vote (deciding which of the singers who lost in round 1 would advance) and advanced to round 2. | | |
| Grand Finals: Round 2 | "Big River" | The Melodians | 11.30% | 4th | Fourth Place |

== Awards ==
| Year | Award Show | Award(s) |
|---|---|---|
| 2003 | 10th Oriental Billboard Awards | Newcomer Silver Award and Top Ten Golden Songs《Indifferent》 |
| 2003 | 1st Southeastern Music Chart Awards | Madden Media Recommended Best Male Singer, Best Creator and Top Ten Hits For《Indifferent》 |
| 2004 | 11th Oriental Billboard Awards | Most Popular Male Singer and Top Ten Hits For《That Day》 |
| 2005 | 3rd Southeastern Music Chart Awards | Best Male Singer and Top Ten Hits For《I Am More Lonely Than Before》 |
| 2006 | 13th Oriental Billboard Awards | Top Ten Golden Songs《I Am More Lonely Than Before》 |
| 2010 | 8th Southeastern Music Chart Awards | Best Male Singer |

== Discography and Musical Work ==
=== Albums ===
- Indifferent (2001)
- That Day (2003)
- 2008 (2005)
- Cowboy (2007)
- Yang Kun (2009)
- Disco (2010)
- I Really Care (2012)
- 20 Years Old Tonight (2014)
- Lonely 颂 (2017)
- Beautiful Story (2020)
- Love finishes (2023)

=== EP's ===
- EP: Fast Gunner (July 2013)
- EP: I Am Not As Strong As You Think (September 2013)
- EP: Life Like Stone (November 2013)
- EP: Answer (Spring Festival Evening Duet With Amber Kuo) (January 2014)
- EP: Someone (Cover of Sing My Song Participant Du Qiu's works) (March 2014)
- EP: 20 Years Old Tonight (Sing My Song) (March 2014)
- EP: "Want To Die, Must Die In Your Hands (August 5, 2014)
- EP: Ten Thousand Women (August 20, 2014)
- EP: Save Me Quickly (September 2, 2014)
- EP: The River of Endlessness (October 10, 2016)
- EP: Come Home With Me (November 11, 2016)
- EP: Decorate and Hang Colours (Hua Chenyu Rap) (January 9, 2017)
- EP: Stray Dogs Also Have Homesickness (August 17, 2017)

== Filmography ==
- 13 Months (2004) (never released)
- Lost in Panic Cruise (2011)
- Lethal Hostage (2012)
- The Heart (2019)

=== Variety Shows ===
| Year | Show | Role | Ref. |
|---|---|---|---|
| 2012 | The Voice of China (season 1) | Mentor | |
| 2013 | The Most Beautiful Harmony Season 1 | Host | |
| 2014 | The Voice of China (season 3) | Mentor | |
| 2015 | The Most Beautiful Harmony Season 3 | Mentor | |
| 2015 | True Hero | Himself | |
| 2016 | The Next Season 1 | Mentor and Judge | |
| 2017 | The Next Season 2 | Mentor and Judge | |
| 2019 | Singer 2019 | Contestant | |
