= Jason Dy =

Filipino singer (born 1990)

- Born: Jason James Desiata Dy; June 19, 1990 (age 36); Cebu City, Cebu, Philippines
- Genres: Pop, R&B
- Occupations: Singer songwriter actor musician
- Instruments: Vocals, guitar, piano
- Years active: 2014–present
- Labels: MCA Music; Star Magic (2016–present); Cornerstone Entertainment (2018-present)
- Website: YouTube channel

Jason James Desiata Dy (born June 19, 1990) is a Filipino singer, songwriter, musician and occasional actor. He is best known as the winner of the second season of The Voice of the Philippines.

Dy was invited onstage by David Foster to perform with him during his HitMan tour at the Smart Araneta Coliseum, Manila, August 18, 2015. Dy sang "I Have Nothing" with Foster on piano.

Dy's eponymous album, Jason Dy, was released by MCA Universal on September 4, 2015. "Caught in that Feeling", "Milagro", and "Walang Iwanan" were released as singles. A deluxe edition with additional original compositions was released October 2016.

March 2017, Dy received a gold record award from MCA Music for his Jason Dy album at a celebration at Robinson's Galleria. Edray Teodoro and Micka Gorospe performed his songs Caught In That Feeling and Break My Heart.

In May 2017, Dy went on a Malaysian promo tour for his latest single "Nothing Like Cinta Ini" with Malaysian singer Fazura. "Nothing Like Cinta Ini" is the Malaysian version of Dy's single "Nothing Like Pag-Ibig" written by Jungee Marcelo. Dy is currently a regular performer at ABS-CBN's Sunday variety show ASAP. He was a part of the group ASAP Soul Sessions alongside fellow R&B artists, Kyla, Jay R, KZ Tandingan, and Daryl Ong, a group that had a segment from 2016 to 2017.

In 2025-2026, Dy is one of the contestants of the fourth season of Your Face Sounds Familiar and ended up as the third placer.

== Biography ==
=== Early life and education ===
Jason Dy was born on June 19, 1990, in Cebu City, Philippines but was raised by his parents in Butuan City. In 2003, his parents separated; they were granted an annulment in 2014. Jason lived with his mother until she needed to leave for Singapore to find work. He finished primary school at Enfant Cheri Study Centre Butuan City, high school at Father Saturnino Urios University and earned a bachelor's degree in Popular Music at Philippine Women's University.

To support himself, Dy started working as a "haranista". He serenades women in different places of their boyfriends or suitors. He also recorded demo tracks, including the original soundtrack of the 2013 film Bakit Hindi Ka Crush ng Crush Mo?, which was re-recorded by Xian Lim for his XL2 album, as well as "Kontrabida" and "Nasa 'Yo Na Ang Lahat" by Sam Concepcion and Daniel Padilla, respectively. He also uploaded covers on YouTube, and composing an original song entitled "2 Have U".

=== Music career ===
==== 2014–present: The Voice of the Philippines ====
During the second season auditions for ABS-CBN's The Voice of the Philippines, which aired on November 9, 2014, Dy performed Sam Smith's "Stay with Me". Coaches Sarah Geronimo, Lea Salonga, and Apl.de.ap all voted for him, stating that he was able to bring out the emotion of the song through his falsetto skills. Although Bamboo Mañalac did not turn for him, Mañalac expressed that it "was a great performance". Dy eventually chose Geronimo to coach him, as he believed that she would be able to help him build a career in the music industry.

Dy advanced to the finals after winning against Monique Lualhati during the two-part semi-finals stage live at the Newport Performing Arts Theater in Resorts World Manila. He received both the highest votes given by his coach and the viewers' text votes, totaling 60.10% of the combined votes. He then performed a duet with Charice during the first set of the finals night, singing the song "Wrecking Ball", and later sang "With You" for his solo performance. Both songs received praises from the coaches. Apl.de.ap commented, "Amazing job, you have grown so much in this competition. I've seen you dance, do all kinds of different things. Congratulations with that performance".

Along with Alisah Bonaobra, Dy advanced to the second round on the second night of the finale after garnering one of the two highest votes from the public. Subsequently, he won against Bonaobra, receiving 52.94% of the text votes, not including the votes from the first round. He was proclaimed the winner at the end of the competition, winning 2 million pesos, a house and lot from Camella Homes, and a recording and managing contract with MCA Music, among other prizes. His winning song, "Minsan Lang Kita Iibigin", received praises from his coach, Geronimo, who commented, "That is Jason, that is special about Jason. He is the voice of today, he is a world-class talent, and his voice deserves to be heard all over the world". Coincidentally, both Dy and Geronimo became champions on the same day, March 1.

On August 30, 2018, Dy held a collaboration concert with Jaya and Jay R titled SoulJa at the Newport Performing Arts Theater, Resorts World Manila.

The Voice of the Philippines season 2 performances and results
Week	Theme	Song	Original Artist	Date	Result
Blind Audition	—N/a	"Stay with Me"	Sam Smith	November 9, 2014	Three-chair turners (Sarah, Lea Salonga, Apl.de.ap); Joined Team Sarah
Battle Rounds	—N/a	"On Bended Knee" (with Daniel Ombao)	Boyz II Men	December 6, 2014	Won
Knockouts	—N/a	"Jar of Hearts"	Christina Perri	January 17, 2015	Advanced
Live shows	—N/a	"Thinking Out Loud"	Ed Sheeran	January 31, 2015	Sarah's choice
Live shows	—N/a	"OMG"	Usher	February 7, 2015	Sarah's Choice
Live shows	Dedication to loved one	"Kahit Kailan"	South Border	February 14, 2015	Public votes
Semi-finals	Personal stories	"Back at One"	Brian McKnight	February 21, 2015	Highest votes from both public votes and coach's score
Semi-finals	Duet with co-competitor	"Nothing's Gonna Stop Us Now" (with Monique Lualhati)	Albert Hammond and Diane Warren	February 22, 2015	Highest votes from both public votes and coach's score
Finals	Duet with guest artist	"Wrecking Ball" (with Charice)	Miley Cyrus	February 28, 2015	One of the two highest public votes
Finals	Upbeat songs	"With You"	Chris Brown	February 28, 2015	One of the two highest public votes
Finals	Dramatic songs	"Angels Brought Me Here"	Guy Sebastian	March 1, 2015	One of the two highest public votes
Finals	Duet with coach	"If I Ain't Got You"	Alicia Keys	March 1, 2015	One of the two highest public votes
Finals	Final showdown	"Minsan Lang Kitang Iibigin"	Ariel Rivera	March 1, 2015	Winner

In August 2026, Dy, along with Sassa Dagdag, are announced as artists participating in the Philippine Selection Night, the national selection for the Eurovision Song Contest Asia 2026, performing " 'Di 'Yan (Red Flag)" by composer Jason Marvin.

== Filmography ==
=== Television ===
Year	Title	Role	Network	Notes
2014	The Voice of the Philippines season 2	Himself / Contestant / Grand Winner	ABS-CBN	Blind Audition
2014	The Voice of the Philippines season 2	Himself / Contestant / Grand Winner	ABS-CBN	Battle Rounds
2015	The Voice of the Philippines season 2	Himself / Contestant / Grand Winner	ABS-CBN	Knockouts
2015	The Voice of the Philippines season 2	Himself / Contestant / Grand Winner	ABS-CBN	Live Shows
2015	The Voice of the Philippines season 2	Himself / Contestant / Grand Winner	ABS-CBN	Semi-finals
2015	The Voice of the Philippines season 2	Himself / Contestant / Grand Winner	ABS-CBN	Finals
2015	The Voice of the Philippines season 2	Performer	ABS-CBN	Ang Tinig Natin Special Concert
2015	Aquino & Abunda Tonight	Guest	ABS-CBN	
2015	It's Showtime	Guest	ABS-CBN	
2015	Kris TV	Guest	ABS-CBN	
2015	Gandang Gabi Vice	Guest	ABS-CBN	
2015	Banana Split	Guest	ABS-CBN	
2015–present	ASAP	Himself	ABS-CBN	ASAP Soul Sessions (2016–17); Main Performer
2016	Be My Lady	Emerson Francisco	ABS-CBN	Special Participation
2018	Ipaglaban Mo!	Brian	ABS-CBN	Episode: "Bitin"
2021	Maalaala Mo Kaya	Christian Ramos	Kapamilya Channel; A2Z	Episode: "Planner"
2024	Tawag ng Tanghalan Kids season 2	Himself	Kapamilya Channel; A2Z; GTV; GMA Network	Judge
2025	It's Showtime	Himself	Kapamilya Channel; A2Z; ALLTV; GMA Network	Guest Performer
2025–2026	Your Face Sounds Familiar season 4	Himself	Kapamilya Channel; A2Z; ALLTV; TV5	Contestant
2025–2026	Rainbow Rumble	Himself	Kapamilya Channel; A2Z; ALLTV; TV5	Contestant
2026	Everybody, Sing! season 4	Himself	Kapamilya Channel; A2Z; ALLTV; TV5	Guest Singers

== Discography ==
=== As a demo artist ===
- Bakit Hindi Ka Crush ng Crush Mo? OST, 2013 (recorded by Xian Lim)
- "Kontrabida", 2013 (recorded by Sam Concepcion)
- "Nasa 'Yo Na Ang Lahat", 2013 (recorded by Daniel Padilla)
- "Ikaw Na", 2014 (recorded by Jed Madela)

=== As a lead artist ===
==== Studio albums ====
- All About Me, 2013
- Jason Dy, 2015
- Jason Dy (Deluxe), 2016

==== Singles ====
- Caught in that Feeling, 2015
- Milagro, 2015
- Walang Iwanan, 2016
- Nothing Like Pag-ibig, 2017
- Nothing Like Cinta Ini with Fazura, 2017
- Pano Na Lang Ako, 2017
- Tayo Na Lang Kasi with Kyla, 2017
- Diyan Ba Sa Langit with Morissette and KIKX, 2019
- Gusto Ko Pa with Jay R, 2020
- Piliin ang Pag-ibig with Soc Villanueva, 2021

== Accolades ==
Year	Award	Category	Nominated work	Result	Ref.
2016	Myx Music Awards 2016	Favorite New Artist	Himself	Won	
2017	30th Awit Award	Best R&B Recording	Pano Na Lang	Nominated	

Preceded by Mitoy Yonting	The Voice of the Philippines; Winner; 2014–15	Succeeded by Elha Nympha
Preceded by Mitoy Yonting	The Voice of the Philippines Regular; Winner; 2014–15	Succeeded by Incumbent
