= Live at Heart =

Swedish film and music showcase

- Genre: Conference and festival
- Dates: September (dates vary sometimes starting in August)
- Frequency: Annual
- Locations: Örebro, Sweden
- Years active: 2010 to present
- Inaugurated: 2010
- Founders: Anders Damberg, Johannes Nilsson, Peter Astedt
- Next event: 11–14 September 2024
- Website: liveatheart.se

Live at Heart is an annual showcase festival of film, music festivals and conferences organized jointly that take place in September in Örebro, Sweden. It began in 2010 as a showcase for independent musical artists evolving into a platform for emerging talent and established artists of diverse musical genres. It is Scandinavia's biggest showcase festival for independent films, filmmakers, musical artists, and industry conference of panels, meetings, and workshops. It is attended by audiences and professional delegates from the international music and film industry.

Örebro, where the festival takes place, is a city with a castle, river, cobblestone roads along with modern night clubs, restaurants and bars. Films are screened in the Bio Roxy theatre, first opened in 1913.

In 2018, the first “Live at Heart” International Music Showcase was hosted in Canada on the Burin Peninsula by Vision 360 with support from the governments of Canada, Newfoundland and Labrador.
