= Kamifusen (duo) =

Japanese folk music group

Kamifūsen (Paper Balloon) 紙ふうせん
- Origin: Kansai, Japan
- Genres: J-pop; Folk rock
- Years active: 1974 - present
- Labels: EMI Music Japan; King; Sony Music; West Wings Records
- Members: Etsujiroh Gotoh; Yasuyo Hirayama
- Website: orange.zero.jp/kamifusen/top.html

Kamifūsen (紙ふうせん, Paper Balloon) is a Japanese folk duo formed in 1974 by Etsujirō Gotō (後藤悦治郎, b. April 29, 1946) and Yasuyo Hirayama (平山泰代, b. March 28, 1947). The artists were previously part of the Kansai folk group Akaitori (赤い鳥), which was known for its unique sound blending light rock with choral harmonies. Their style is characterized by interpretations of traditional songs with arrangements using contemporary sounds and rhythms. Kamifūsen is active in the Kansai region of Japan and have recorded internationally in Santa Monica, California, and Toronto, Canada.

== History ==
Kamifūsen's music was inspired by Peter, Paul & Mary, who had a strong influence on the 1970s Japanese folk movement. Gotō and Hirayama first formed a duo in 1967, when they were both in the second year of university. As they added more members, they formed Akaitori, which means "red bird", in 1969.

=== Akaitori ===
Akaitori was discovered by producer Kunihiko Murai (村井邦彦) after winning the 1969 Yamaha Light Music Contest Grand Prix Award for "Takeda's Lullaby." Making their formal debut in 1970, the folk group became best known for the hit single "Tsubasa wo Kudasai", which became the official song of the Japan Football Association when Japan made its first appearance at the World Cup in France. After disbanding in August 1974, former members formed Kamifūsen, Hi-Fi Set, and Humming Bird.

=== Kamifūsen (1974 to 1991) ===
In September 1974, Gotō and Hirayama started Kamifūsen, continuing to perform "Tsubasa wo Kudasai", which became part of the standard choral repertoire in elementary schools. In 1977, Kamifūsen had their first major hit "Before Winter Comes", which became a signature song for the group. The song reached number 4 on the Oricon Singles Chart, with lyrics written by Gotō, and music composed by Tadashi Urano (浦野直).

Kamifūsen released nine albums between 1974 and 1986; seven of them were recorded in Japan, while Here With Me was recorded in Santa Monica, California, and Echo Of Love in Toronto, Canada. Here With Me (1984) was produced by Henry Lewy, featuring the original song "Cherry Blossom" written by Peter Yarrow and a Japanese cover version of "The Outside In," a Carmine Coppola theme from The Outsiders soundtrack. Echo Of Love (1986) featured musicians from The Anne Murray Band.

=== TSU-BA-SA ===
In 1991, Gotō and Hirayama participated as members of TSU-BA-SA, formed by Yoshiyuki Nishiguchi (西口善之) and Tomomi Aoyama (青山智美). After releasing the albums Angel On The Roof (1990) and TIME (1991), they returned to work as Kamifūsen.

=== Kamifūsen (1993 to present) ===
Kamifūsen released seven albums from 1993 to present. Live performances included recitals at Osaka Central Public Hall, Osaka Theater Drama City, Osaka Sankei Hall Breeze, and Hyogo Performing Arts Center. In 2019, Kamifūsen held their "45th Anniversary Concert - 50th Anniversary Recital from Red Bird" at Yomiuri Ōtemachi Hall in Tokyo.

== Personal ==
Gotō and Hirayama were classmates at Amagasaki Kita High School in Hyōgo Prefecture. They were reunited after starting university, when they were both interested in traditional songs, and developed a connection. The couple were married at the age of 20 while part of Akaitori.

Hirayama has appeared as a radio show host for several decades. In 2005, Gotō appeared as a lecturer on NHK Educational TV 's Shumi Yūyū (趣味悠々).

== Discography ==
=== Albums ===
- 1974: We Became Two Again (またふたりになったね)
- 1976: Love and Freedom (愛と自由を)
- 1978: Reunion -A New Journey- (再会 -新たなる旅立ち-)
- 1979: Friends (フレンズ)
- 1982: Tomodachi ~ Poetry of the World of Chihiro Iwasaki ~ (ともだち 〜いわさきちひろの世界を詩う〜)
- 1983: Someday Together (いつか二人で)
- 1984: HERE WITH ME
- 1986: ECHO OF LOVE
- 2000: Saintjeum
- 2001: Blue Sky and Sea (青空と海)

==== With TSU-BA-SA ====
- 1991: Angel On The Roof
- 1992: TIME

=== Singles ===
- 1974: "Ikatsuri Uta (いかつり唄 )"
- 1974: "Something Good is Going to Happen (何かいいことありそうな)"
- 1975: "Sasabune (ささぶね)"
- 1975: "White Construction Paper (白い画用紙)"
- 1975: "Farewell Bell (別れの鐘)"
- 1976: "Love and Freedom (愛と自由を)"
- 1976: "Boy's Day (少年の日)"
- 1977: "Before Winter Comes (冬が来る前に)"
- 1978: "Even If it Gets Wet with Fog (霧にぬれても)"
- 1978: "Who Should I Tell... (誰に告げようか…)"
- 1979: "A Loving Farewell (愛ある別れ)"
- 1979: "I Was Born (僕は生まれた)"
- 1980: "Maruyama River Funauta (円山川舟唄)"
- 1980: "Showa Modori Bridge (昭和戻り橋)"
- 1982: "Friend (ともだち)"
- 1983: "Kitayama Longing (北山慕情)"
- 1983: "Spread Your Wings (翼ひろげて)"
- 1984: "One man band"
- 1986: "Stare at (みつめて)"
- 1986: "ECHO OF LOVE"
- 2003: "I Want to Be Like You (あなたの風になりたい)"

=== Tie-ups ===
Music	Tie-up	Recorded work
White Construction Paper (白い画用紙)	SHUFUNOTOMO Publishing "Watashi no Baby" 3rd Anniversary Lyric Recruitment Selected Works	Single "White Construction Paper (白い画用紙)"
On The Wings Of The Wind (風の翼に)	NHK Ginga Television Novel Furusato Series "Happiness Station Area & Ueno Station Area" Theme Song	Single "Who Should I Tell... (誰に告げようか…)"
I Was Born (僕は生まれた)	Ending theme for Fuji TV's Nissei Family Special Feature Animation "Tondemo Nezumi Daikaku"	Single "I Was Born (僕は生まれた)"
Spread Your Wings (翼ひろげて)	Theme song for TBS Television (Japan) drama Love Theater "Wagakoyo III"	Single "Spread Your Wings (翼ひろげて)"
ECHO OF LOVE	Mainichi Broadcasting System series drama (nationwide network) "Affair Family" theme song	Single "ECHO OF LOVE"
Times Change (時代は変わる)	TV Asahi "JO Kigen" theme song from the morning	Album TIME
Wedding Anniversary Day	Nippon Sheet Glass CM song	Album TIME
Give Me Wings (翼をください)	Japan Football Association official support song	Collaboration single "Give Me Wings (翼をください)"
Rainbow (虹)	TV Tokyo "TV Champion" ending theme	Album Blue Sky and Sea (青空と海)
I Want to Be Like You (あなたの風になりたい)	Mainichi Broadcasting System TV drama special "Cynthia ~The story of the birth of a service dog~" ending theme	Single "I Want to Be Like You (あなたの風になりたい)"

=== Songs used in NHK "Songs of Ours" ===
Song title	Lyricist	Composer	Producer	Period of use
Rape Blossoms (菜の花ばたけ)	Yoji Unno	Etsujiroh Gotoh	Katsuhisa Hattori	April-May, 1975
My Paper Balloon (わたしの紙風船)	Akira Shimaoka	Nobuyoshi Koshibe		April-May, 1983
Ho Hi Ho (ホーハイホー)	Etsujiroh Gotoh		Tetsuya Imade	June-July, 1999
