= Zendee =

Filipina singer (born 1991)

- Born: Zendee Rose Japitana Tenerefe; June 21, 1991 (age 35); General Santos, Philippines
- Genres: Pop music Original Pilipino Music; Rhythm and blues
- Instrument: Vocals
- Years active: 2011–present
- Labels: Warner Music Philippines; MCA Music Entertainment Group
- Website: www.zendeesinger.com

Zendee Rose Japitana Tenerefe, known mononymously as Zendee, is a Filipina singer & also a host. She rose to prominence after a video of her singing a karaoke version of Whitney Houston's "I Will Always Love You" was put on YouTube by Yuan Juan a.k.a. youngjay0918. Known on YouTube as the "Random girl of SM Megamall" she gained a following and went on to sign with the record label Warner Music Philippines. Prior to her discovery, she had already participated in numerous singing competitions in the Philippines.

== Personal life ==
Tenerefe was born in General Santos in South Cotabato province until she moved to Manila to audition for the ABS-CBN talent search X Factor Philippines. She failed to go far in the local version of X Factor but still made efforts to continue singing. Tenerefe also won as the Gensan Pop Idol in 2007, an annual competition every Tuna Festival.

Tenerefe is in relationship with Archer Perez, a shoutcaster, esports event host and content creator, since February 2024.

== Discovery and viral video ==
On July 28, 2012, a video called "Random Girl" was uploaded to the video site YouTube by youngjay0918 a.k.a. Yuan Juan. The video showed Tenerefe performing karaoke at the SM Megamall, Philippines. Her singing brought attention from that platform's viewers and immediately became a viral video. The original video got over 2 million views in three months. The video prompted the GMA Network magazine show, Kapuso Mo, Jessica Soho to look for her and when she was found they featured her in one of their episodes. She admitted later that she sang in public to try and gain people's attention.

Another video of her singing at the same event was uploaded to YouTube where she sings "And I Am Telling You" from the musical Dreamgirls.

== Musical career ==
After Tenerefe was identified she began to be invited to TV shows. Her most "global" exposure was her appearance on The Ellen DeGeneres Show after being invited by Ellen DeGeneres herself. Tenerefe is the fifth Philippine-raised singer to be invited after global superstar Charice, Ramiele Malubay, Rhap Salazar and Journey frontman Arnel Pineda. She also met singer Jason Mraz and was the opening act in one of his concerts. Zendee released her debut album, I Believe, in 2013. It has 10 songs and an acoustic version of her song "Runaway". Her second album, Z, was released in 2015.

== Discography ==
Albums

- I Believe (2013)
- Z (2015)

Singles

- "Runaway" (2012)
- "Cutie Uyyy" (2021)

== Shows and guest appearances ==
Year	Title	Character/Role	Note(s)
2023	Mukhang Perya	Co-host	
2023	Sino'ng Manok Mo?	Co-host	
2023	Pera o Bayong	Co-host	
2021–2022	Sing Galing!	Online Digiverse host	
2021	Lunch Out Loud	Guest performer	
2020	Eat Bulaga: Bawal Judgmental	Contestant	Together with Marvin Fojas
2019	Tawag ng Tanghalan: Celebrity Champions	Celebrity contender	Batch 2 contender
2012	Party Pilipinas	Guest performer	
2012	Magpakailanman: The Zendee Life Story	Guest	Role portrayed by Louise delos Reyes
2012	Headstart with Karen Davila	Guest	
2012	The Ellen DeGeneres Show	Guest	
