= Marco Pereira =

Brazilian classical guitarist and music educator (born 1950)

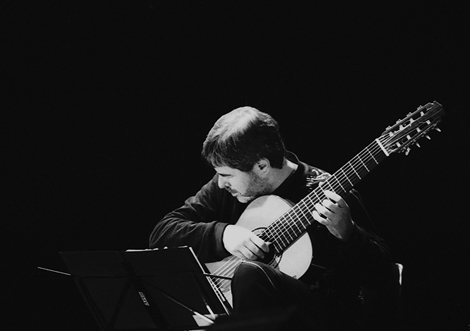
- Pereira in 2006
- Born: 1950 (age 75–76); São Paulo, Brazil
- Education: Paris-Sorbonne University
- Occupations: Guitarist; music educator
- Employer: Federal University of Rio de Janeiro
- Style: Classical
- Website: www.marcopereira.com.br

Marco Pereira (born 1950) is a Brazilian classical guitarist and music educator. He was born in São Paulo and took lessons from Isaías Sávio, an important Uruguayan guitarist and teacher who brought Miguel Llobet's technique to Brazil. Pereira obtained his master's degree at the Paris-Sorbonne University; his thesis was titled Heitor Villa-Lobos and His Work for Guitar. He teaches harmony, composition arranging, and improvisation at the Federal University of Rio de Janeiro (UFRJ). Pereira has released several solo CDs, including Dança dos Quatro Ventos (GHA, Belgium), Elegia (Channel Classics, Netherlands), Brasil Musical (Tom Brasil), Valsas Brasileiras (Garbolights), Luz das Cordas (Garbolights), O Samba da Minha Terra (Garbolights), Camerístico (Garbolights), Cristal (Garbolights), Original (Guitar Solo Publications), "Stella del Matino" (EGEA, Perugia, Italy) and "Essence" (Kind of Blue, Lugano, Switzerland). His compositions were issued by the publishers Éditions Lémoine of Paris and Guitar Solo Publications of San Francisco.

His instructional publications include Ritmos Brasileiros (Brazilian Rhythms), Cadernos de Harmonia (Harmony Method for Guitar), Brazilian Seven String Guitar – Technique and Style, Cristal and Valsas Brasileiras.

His compositions and books are edited by Éditions Lemoine (Paris), Guitar Solo Publications (San Francisco), Editora Musimed (Brasília) and Garbolights Produções Artísticas Ltda. (Rio de Janeiro).

== Awards ==
He has won important prizes in international guitar competitions such as Concurso Andrés Segóvia (Palma de Mallorca) and Concurso Francisco Tárrega (Valencia). In Brazil, he won the Brazilian Sharp Award for Best Soloist and for Best Album of the Year (1994). He also received an award for best arranger for the album Gal, by Gal Costa.

== Discography ==
- Cristal
- Cameristico (guitar and orchestra)
- O Samba da Minha Terra
- Original
- Afinidade
- Valsas Brasileiras
- Luz das Cordas
- Violão Popular Brasileiro Contemporaneo
- Circulo das Cordas
- Dança dos Quatro Ventos
- Elegia
- Bons Encontros
- Brasil Musical

== Books ==
- Cadernos de Harmonia
- Cristal
- Ritmos Brasileiros (Brazilian Rhythms)
- Valsas Brasileiras (Brazilian Waltzes)
- Heitor Villa-Lobos and His Work for Guitar
- Sete Cordas, Técnica e Estilo (Seven String Guitar, Technique and Style)
