= Music Moves Europe Awards =

Annual prize for emerging artists

- Awarded for: Award to stimulate cross border success of debuting European artists
- Date: January (Eurosonic Noorderslag opening night)
- Location: Oosterpoort Theatre, Groningen
- Country: The Netherlands
- Presented by: Eurosonic Noorderslag; European Commission
- Hosted by: Jools Holland
- Formerly called: European Border Breakers Award (2004–2018); Music Moves Europe Talent Award (2019–2021)
- First award: 2004
- Website: mmeawards.eu

Television/radio coverage
- Network: NOS/NTR, broadcast through NPO 3

The Music Moves Europe Awards, also known as the MME Awards, is an annual prize recognizing the success of ten emerging artists or groups who reached audiences outside their own countries with their first internationally released album in the past year. The prize was known as the European Border Breakers Awards (EBBA) until 2019, and the Music Moves Europe Talent Awards (MMETA) until 2022.

== Organization ==
The EBBA Awards were launched by the European Commission and are a European Union award. Since 2009, the awards are organised by Eurosonic Noorderslag and the award is presented at the Eurosonic Noorderslag festival.

== Partners ==
- European Broadcasting Union (EBU)
- The European Talent Exchange Program (ETEP), which creates a network between European popular music festivals, facilitating the booking of European bands from outside their home country. It also gives information to the media about emerging European artists.

== Selection of the winners ==
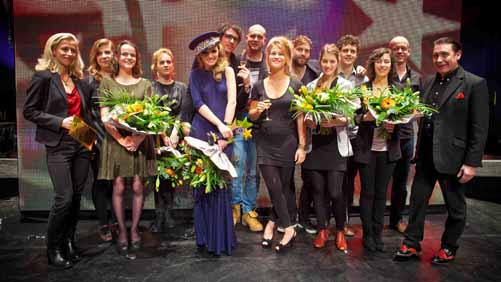
EBBA Awards 2012 – All Winners

The artists or groups nominated for the European Border Breakers Awards are selected on the basis of the following criteria:

- The success of the first international release in European countries other than the home territory of the artist in the past year.
- Radio airplay given to an artist by the European Broadcasting Union (EBU) radio channels.
- The artist's success at European festivals (ETEP) outside of his/her home country.

== Public Choice Award ==
Since 2010, an online vote takes place to choose which EBBA Award winner will receive the Public Choice Award, on top of the "regular" award. The first winner was Belgian singer-songwriter Milow. The German rock & roll band The Baseballs won in 2011. Selah Sue from Belgium won the prize in 2012.

== The show ==
Since 2009 the award ceremony takes place every year in January, during the Eurosonic Noorderslag festival, in the Dutch city of Groningen, presented by BBC host and musician Jools Holland. EBBA Award winners perform live during the show, as well as during the festival itself. Winners from previous years are invited to perform as special guests. The ceremony is recorded by the public broadcaster NOS/NTR and broadcast through NPO 3. The show is annually broadcast on several European television channels.

== Background ==
The EBBA Awards were initiated by the European Commission in 2004. With the awards, the European Commission aims to stimulate the cross-border circulation of popular music repertoire and to highlight Europe's great musical diversity. The European Border Breakers Awards are supported through the Culture Programme of the European Union, which seeks to promote cross-border mobility of artists and culture professionals; to encourage the transnational circulation of cultural and artistic output; and to foster intercultural dialogue.

== List of winners ==
=== 2004 ===
Country	Artist	Album
Belgium	Lasgo	Some Things
Denmark	Saybia	The Second You Sleep
France	Carla Bruni	Quelqu'un m'a dit
Germany	Masterplan	Masterplan
Ireland	The Thrills	So Much for the City
Italy	Tiziano Ferro	Rosso relativo
Portugal	Mariza	Fado Em Mim
Spain	Las Ketchup	Hijas del Tomate
United Kingdom	The Darkness	Permission to Land

=== 2005 ===
Country	Artist	Album
Denmark	The Raveonettes	Chain Gang of Love
Finland	Redrama	Everyday Soundtrack
France	Corneille	Parce qu'on vient de loin
Germany	Wir sind Helden	Die Reklamation
Ireland	Damien Rice	O
Italy	Benny Benassi	Hypnotica
Poland	Myslovitz	Korova Milky Bar
Sweden	Ana Johnsson	The Way I Am
United Kingdom	Katie Melua	Call Off the Search

=== 2006 ===
Country	Artist	Album
Belgium	Sam Bettens	Scream
Denmark	Hush	A Lifetime
France	Amel Bent	Un jour d'été
Germany	Juli	Es ist Juli
Hungary	Heaven Street Seven	Get Out And Walk!
Ireland	Hal	Hal
Spain	Bebe	Pafuera Telarañas
Sweden	Arash	"Boro Boro"
United Kingdom	KT Tunstall	Eye to the Telescope

=== 2007 ===
Country	Artist	Album
Belgium	Gabriel Ríos	Ghostboy
France	Ilona Mitrecey	Un monde parfait
Germany	Tokio Hotel	Schrei
Greece	Helena Paparizou	My Number One
Ireland	Celtic Woman	Celtic Woman
Italy	Vittorio Grigolo	In the Hands of Love
Poland	Blog 27	LOL
Spain	Beatriz Luengo	BL
Sweden	José González	Veneer
United Kingdom	Corinne Bailey Rae	Corinne Bailey Rae

=== 2008 ===
Country	Artist	Album
Belgium	Born	Fools Rush In
Denmark	Dúné	We Are In There You Are Out Here
Finland	Sunrise Avenue	On The Way To Wonderland
France	Ayọ	Joyful
Germany	Cascada	Everytime We Touch
Ireland	Dolores O'Riordan	Are You Listening?
Poland	Hemp Gru	Klucz
Spain	Miguel Ángel Muñoz	M.A.M.
Sweden	Basshunter	LOL <(^^,)>
United Kingdom	The Fratellis	Costello Music

=== 2009 ===
Country	Artist	Album
Denmark	Alphabeat	Alphabeat
Denmark	Ida Corr	One
France	AaRON	Artificial Animals Riding on Neverland
France	The Dø	A Mouthful
Germany	Cinema Bizarre	Final Attraction
Ireland	The Script	The Script
Netherlands	Kraak & Smaak	Boogie Angst
Sweden	Lykke Li	Youth Novels
United Kingdom	Adele	19
United Kingdom	The Ting Tings	We Started Nothing

=== 2010 ===
Country	Artist	Album
Austria	Soap&Skin	Lovetune for Vacuum
Belgium	Milow	Milow
Estonia	Kerli	Love Is Dead
France	Sliimy	Paint Your Face
Germany	Peter Fox	Stadtaffe
Italy	Giusy Ferreri	Gaetana
Netherlands	Esmée Denters	Outta Here
Portugal	Buraka Som Sistema	Black Diamond
Sweden	Jenny Wilson	Hardships!
United Kingdom	Charlie Winston	Hobo

Public Choice Award: Milow

=== 2011 ===
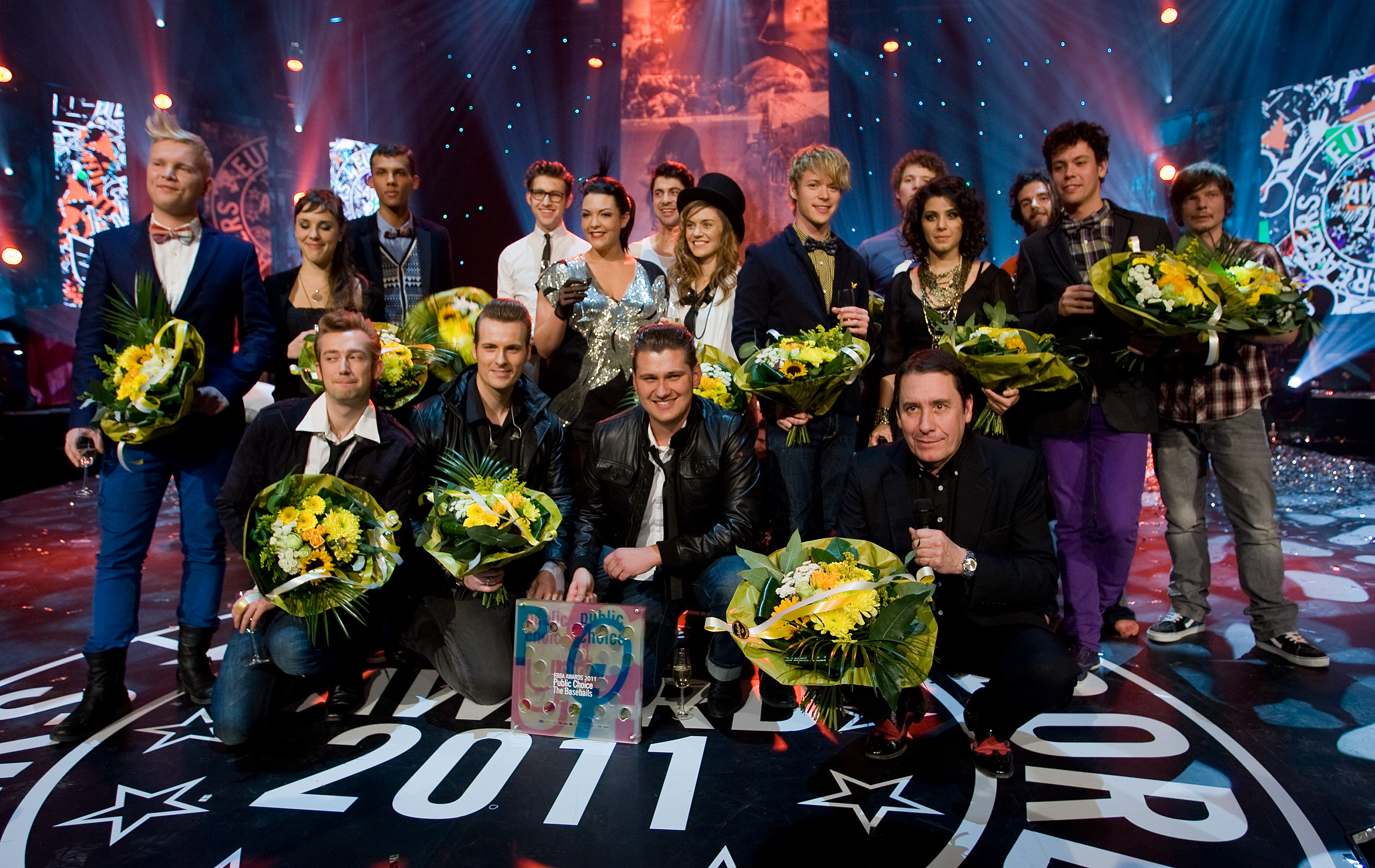
EBBA Awards 2011 – All Winners

Country	Artist	Album
Austria	Saint Lu	Saint Lu
Belgium	Stromae	Cheese
Denmark	Aura Dione	Columbine
France	Zaz	ZAZ
Germany	The Baseballs	Strike!
Netherlands	Caro Emerald	Deleted Scenes from the Cutting Room Floor
Norway	Donkeyboy	Caught in a Life
Romania	Inna	Hot
Sweden	Miike Snow	Miike Snow
United Kingdom	Mumford & Sons	Sigh No More

Public Choice Award: The Baseballs

=== 2012 ===
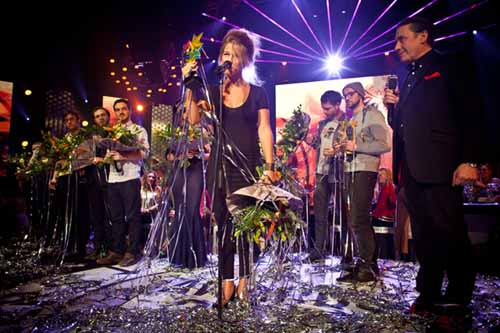
EBBA Awards 2012 – Selah Sue wins Public Choice Award

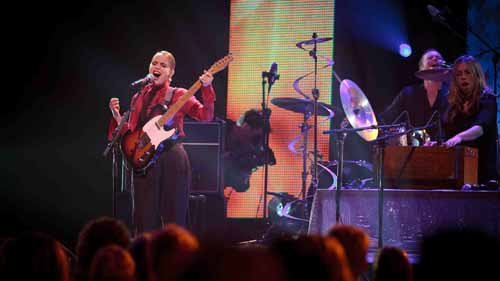
EBBA Awards 2012 – Anna Calvi

Country	Artist	Album
Austria	Elektro Guzzi	Elektro Guzzi
Belgium	Selah Sue	Selah Sue
Denmark	Agnes Obel	Philharmonics
France	Ben l'Oncle Soul	"Soulman"
Germany	Boy	Mutual Friends
Ireland	James Vincent McMorrow	Early in the Morning
Netherlands	Afrojack	Lost and Found
Romania	Alexandra Stan	Saxobeats
Sweden	Swedish House Mafia	Until One
United Kingdom	Anna Calvi	Anna Calvi

Public Choice Award: Selah Sue

=== 2013 ===
Country	Artist	Album
Denmark	Nabiha	More Cracks
Estonia	Ewert and The Two Dragons	Good Man Down
Finland	French Films	Imaginary Future
France	C2C	Tetra
Iceland	Of Monsters and Men	My Head Is an Animal
Netherlands	Dope D.O.D.	Branded
Portugal	Amor Electro	Cai o Carmo e a Trindade
Spain	Juan Zelada	High Ceilings & Collarbones
Sweden	Niki & The Dove	Instinct
United Kingdom	Emeli Sandé	Our Version of Events

=== 2014 ===
Country	Artist	Album
Austria	GuGabriel	Anima(L)
Denmark	Lukas Graham	Lukas Graham
France	Woodkid	The Golden Age
Germany	Zedd	Clarity
Iceland	Ásgeir	Dýrð í dauðaþögn
Ireland	Kodaline	In a Perfect World
Netherlands	Jacco Gardner	Cabinet of Curiosities
Norway	Envy	The Magic Soup and the Bittersweet Faces
Sweden	Icona Pop	This Is... Icona Pop
United Kingdom	Disclosure	Settle

=== 2015 ===
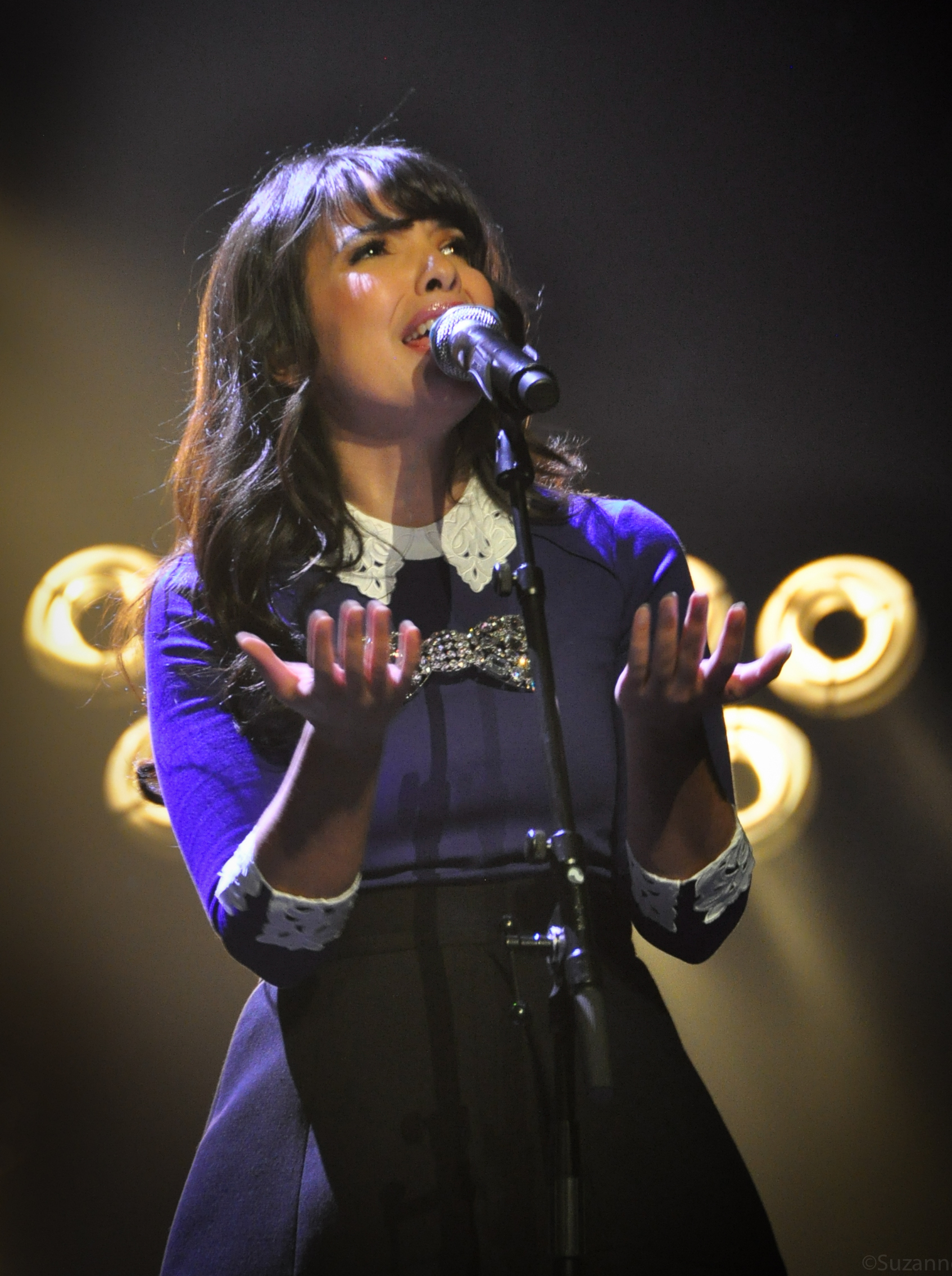
EBBA Awards 2015 – Indila

Country	Artist	Album
Austria	Klangkarussell	Netzwerk
Belgium	Mélanie De Biasio	No Deal
Denmark	MØ	No Mythologies to Follow
France	Indila	Mini World
Germany	Milky Chance	Sadnecessary
Ireland	Hozier	Hozier
Netherlands	The Common Linnets	The Common Linnets
Norway	Todd Terje	It's Album Time
Sweden	Tove Lo	Queen of the Clouds
United Kingdom	John Newman	Tribute

Winner Public Choice Award: The Common Linnets

Best festival act award (awarded for the first time at this edition): Jungle

=== 2016 ===
Country	Artist	Album
Belgium	Oscar and the Wolf	Entity
France	Christine and the Queens	Chaleur humaine
Germany	Robin Schulz	
Ireland	Soak	Before We Forgot How to Dream
Latvia	Carnival Youth	No Clouds Allowed
Netherlands	Kovacs	
Norway	Aurora	Running with the Wolves
Spain	Álvaro Soler	Eterno Agosto
Sweden	Seinabo Sey	Pretend
United Kingdom	Years & Years	Communion

Public Choice Award: Carnival Youth

=== 2017 ===
Country	Artist
Albania	Era Istrefi
Austria	Filous
Finland	Jaakko Eino Kalevi
France	Jain
Germany	Namika
Ireland	Walking on Cars
Netherlands	Natalie La Rose
Norway	Alan Walker
Spain	Hinds
United Kingdom	Dua Lipa

Public Choice Award: Dua Lipa

=== 2018 ===
Country	Artist
Belgium	Blanche
Bulgaria	Kristian Kostov
Denmark	Off Bloom
France	The Blaze
Finland	Alma
Germany	Alice Merton
Norway	Sigrid
Portugal	Salvador Sobral
Sweden	Skott
United Kingdom	Youngr

Public Choice Award: Kristian Kostov

=== 2019 ===
Genre	Musical artist	Country
Pop	Bishop Briggs	United Kingdom
Pop	Lxandra	Finland
Rock	Pale Waves	United Kingdom
Rock	Pip Blom	Netherlands
Electronic	Smerz	Norway
Electronic	Stelartronic	Austria
RnB/Urban	Rosalía	Spain
RnB/Urban	Aya Nakamura	France
Hip-Hop/Rap	Blackwave	Belgium
Hip-Hop/Rap	Reykjavíkurdætur	Iceland
Singer-songwriter	Avec	Austria
Singer-songwriter	Albin Lee Meldau	Sweden

=== 2020 ===
- Meduza (Italy)
- Girl in Red (Norway)
- Naaz (Netherlands)
- Anna Leone (Sweden)
- Pongo (Portugal)
- Harmed (Hungary)
- 5K HD (Austria)
- Flohio (United Kingdom)

Public Choice Award: Naaz (Netherlands)

=== 2021 ===
- Alyona Alyona (Ukraine)
- Inhaler (Ireland)
- Julia Bardo (Italy)
- Lous and the Yakuza (Belgium)
- Melenas (Spain)
- Rimon (Netherlands)
- Sassy 009 (Norway)
- Vildá (Finland)

Public Choice Award: Alyona Alyona (Ukraine)

=== 2022 ===
The list of 2022 winners:

- Grand Jury MME Award: Meskerem Mees (Belgium)
- MME Awards:
  - Mezerg (France)
  - Alina Pash (Ukraine)
  - Denise Chaila (Ireland)
  - Дeva (Hungary)
  - Blanks (Netherlands)
- Public Choice Award: Ladaniva (Armenia)

=== 2023 ===
The list of 2023 winners:

- Grand Jury MME Award: Sans Soucis (Italy)
- MME Awards:
  - July Jones (Slovenia)
  - Kids Return (France)
  - OSKA (Austria)
  - Queralt Lahoz (Spain)
  - Schmyt (Germany)
- Public Choice Award: Jerry Heil (Ukraine)

=== 2024 ===
The list of 2024 winners:

- Grand Jury MME Award: Zaho de Sagazan (France)
- MME Awards:
  - Yunè Pinku (Ireland)
  - Bulgarian Cartrader (Bulgaria)
  - Giift (Denmark)
  - freekind. (Slovenia)
  - Ralphie Choo (Spain)
- Public Choice Award: Zaho de Sagazan (France)

=== 2025 ===
The list of 2025 winners:

- Grand Jury MME Award: Yamê (France)
- MME Awards:
  - Judeline (Spain)
  - Kingfishr (Ireland)
  - Naomi Sharon (Netherlands)
  - Night Tapes (Estonia)
  - Uche Yara (Austria)
- Public Choice Award: Judeline (Spain)

=== 2026 ===
The list of 2026 winners:

- Grand Jury MME Award: Lia Kali (Spain)
- MME Awards:
  - Sofie Royer (Austria)
  - Camille Yembe (Belgium)
  - Sarah Julia (Netherlands)
  - Della (Cyprus)
  - Carpetman (Ukraine)
- Public Choice Award: Lia Kali (Spain)

== See also ==
- MTV Europe Music Award for Best European Act
- European Parliament Lux Prize
