= Zelada =

Zelada is a Spanish surname. Notable people with the surname include:

- Francesco Saverio de Zelada (1717-1801) Italian Roman Catholic Cardinal
- Héctor Zelada (born 1957), Argentine footballer
- Juan Zelada (born 1981), Spanish musician
- Leo Zelada (born 1970), Peruvian writer
