= Uche Yara =

Austrian singer-songwriter

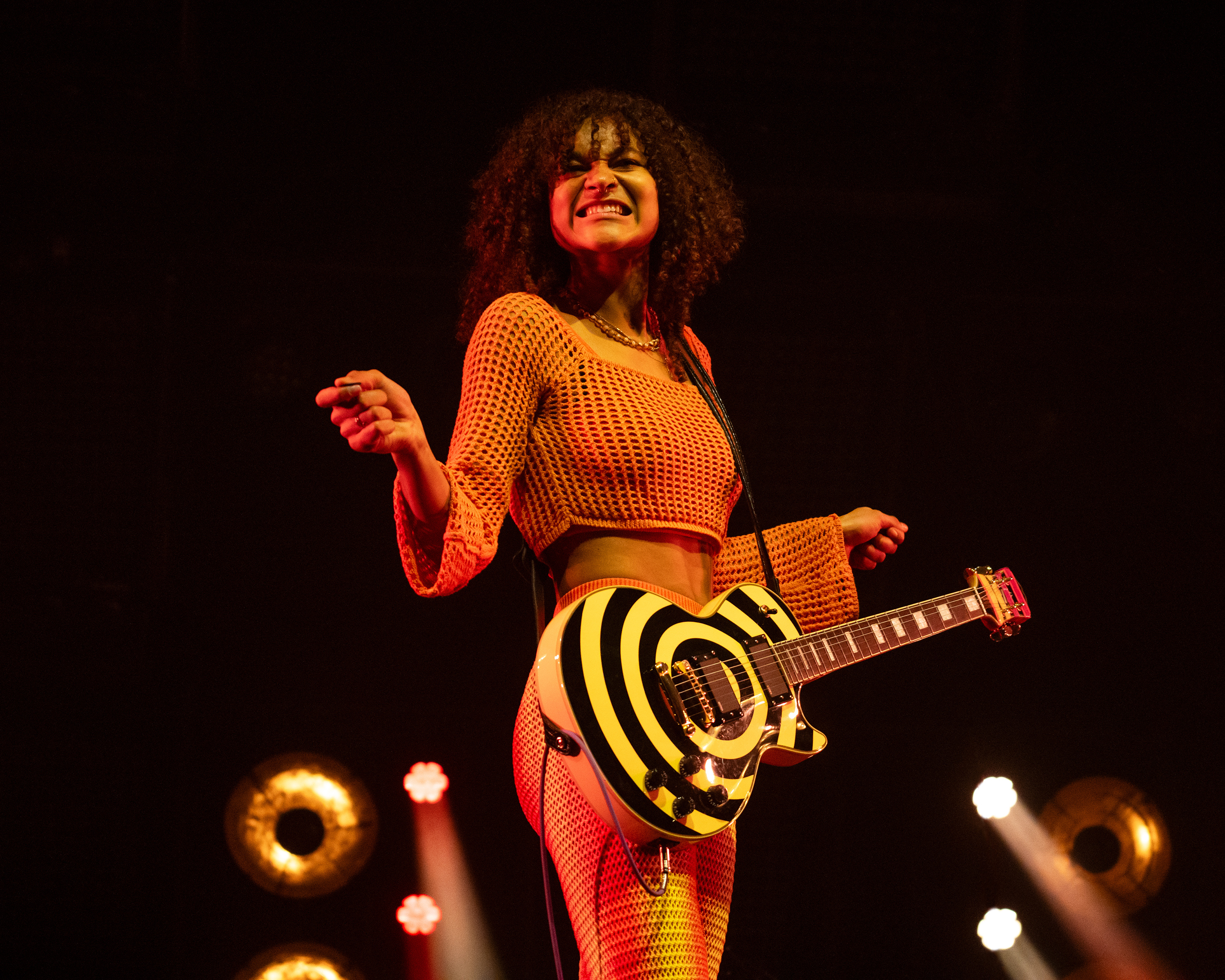
- At Rencontres Trans Musicales 2023

Background information
- Born: Uchenna Yara Katzmayr; Linz, Austria
- Occupations: Singer; songwriter; multi-instrumentalist; record producer

Uchenna Yara Katzmayr, known professionally as Uche Yara (stylized in all caps), is an Austrian singer, songwriter, multi-instrumentalist, and record producer living in Berlin.

== Early life and career ==
Music has accompanied Yara since her earliest childhood. At the age of seven, she began playing classical percussion and later composed her first small pieces for marimba and percussion. At 13, she took electric guitar lessons. Three years later, she wrote her first original songs. Uche Yara is in 2026 a 21-year-old artist with Nigerian roots, who grew up in Linz in Austria and who is now living in Berlin.

== Musical career ==
After graduating from the Pop BORG in Linz, Yara moved to Berlin in 2021 during the COVID-19 pandemic. She initially uploaded her music to SoundCloud – including the song "Tango," which was also played on the radio but was not available on the usual streaming platforms or in stores. Even before her first official release, Yara played her first concert supporting Bilderbuch at the Elbphilharmonie in Hamburg. However, she had already gained stage experience earlier – including as a guitarist with Mavi Phoenix.

For the ReBoot Culture series by YouTube Music, Diffus, Google Arts & Culture, and Initiative Musik, Yara played alongside Esther Graf at the Belvedere Museum in Vienna in June 2022. Just one month later, she performed as support for The Rolling Stones at the band's concert in Vienna's Ernst Happel Stadium. The following year, Yara finally released her first official single Www she hot, with which she performed on shows such as Inas Nacht. The accompanying music video was directed by Mala Kolumna and Florin Elbel and was nominated for the Austrian Music Video Award at the Vienna Shorts 2024.

In May 2024, Yara was named FM4 Soundpark Act of the Month and also released her first EP, Golden Days. At the 2024 Amadeus Awards, she was nominated in the Alternative category. In the same year, she won the VUT Indie Award for Best Newcomer. As part of the online format A Colors Show, she performed her song "Zuu (zoo)", which was also released by ColorsxStudios along with the video. Her second EP, Honey, was released in December 2024.

In January 2025, Yara was one of five winners at the Music Moves Europe Awards. In June 2026, she released "Bodyscanner", the title track for her debut album, as a single. The album is scheduled to release on September 25, 2026.

== Discography ==
Albums

2026: BODYSCANNER (goldendays FM)

=== EPs ===
- 2024: Golden Days (goldendays FM)
- 2024: Honey (goldendays FM)

=== Singles ===
- 2023: "Www she hot" (Goldendays FM)
- 2023: "Sophie" (Goldendays FM)
- 2024: "Yesterday I was in London // homesick" (Goldendays FM)
- 2024: "Sasha (wake up!)" (Goldendays FM)
- 2024: "Zuu (zoo) - A Colors Show" (ColorsxStudios)
- 2024: "As I left the room" (Goldendays FM)
- 2026: "Bodyscanner" (Goldendays FM)

== Awards and nominations ==
Award	Year	Category	Nominee(s)	Result	Ref.
Music Moves Europe Awards	2025	MME Awards	Herself	Won	
