= Tal Madesta =

French writer, women's and trans rights activist (born 1993)

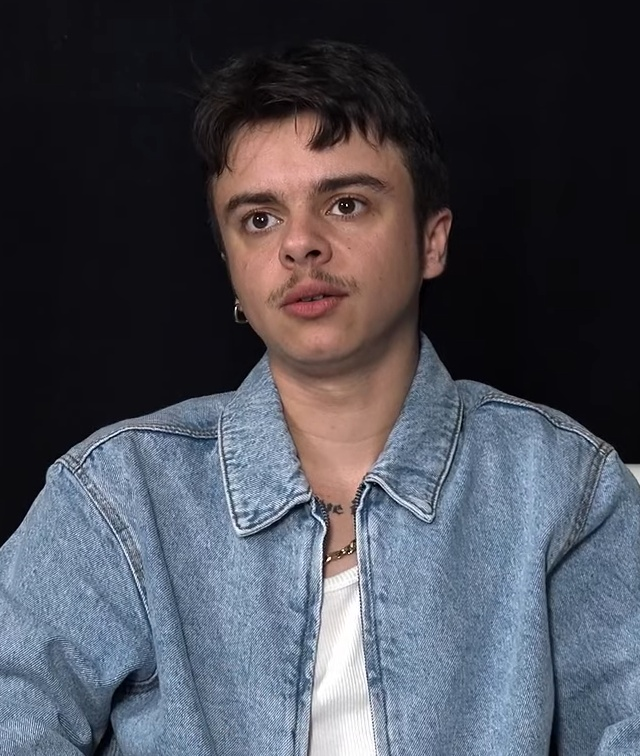
Tal Madesta

Tal Madesta (b. 1993) is a French activist, journalist, and author, known for his commitment to feminism and the defense of transgender rights.

== Early life ==
Tal Madesta comes from a Sephardic Jewish family.

In 2019, he joined the feminist collage movement during the Grenelle on domestic violence. At the same time, he began speaking out on feminist issues via social media. In 2020, he began his gender transition.

== Career ==
In 2021, he took part in the podcast Le Cœur sur la table by Victoire Tuaillon to talk about love without oppression. This podcast episode became his first book, Désirer à tout prix (English: Desire at All Costs), published in 2022 by Binge Editions. His book critiques compulsory sexuality and explores alternative emotional bonds. He also examines the sexual revolution, arguing that it has benefited men more than women. He emphasizes that he is not talking about asexuality but rather about the restriction of sexuality for society as a whole, and suggests alternative approaches to intimacy.

In 2023, he published his second essay, La Fin des monstres (English: The End of Monsters), which is autobiographical. In it, he recounts his own gender transition to counter anti-trans arguments; he also discusses minority stress, detransition, and transphobic violence in contemporary France. The book was commissioned following four essays he wrote for the magazine La Déferlante. It is the first work published by the magazine’s associated publishing house.

== Bibliography ==
- Désirer à tout prix, Binge Editions, 2022
- La Fin des monstres, La Déferlante, 2023
- with Janis Sahraoui (2024). Révéler mes visages. HarperCollins. p. 160. ISBN 979-10-339-1686-4.
