= Oska =

Austrian singer (born 1996)

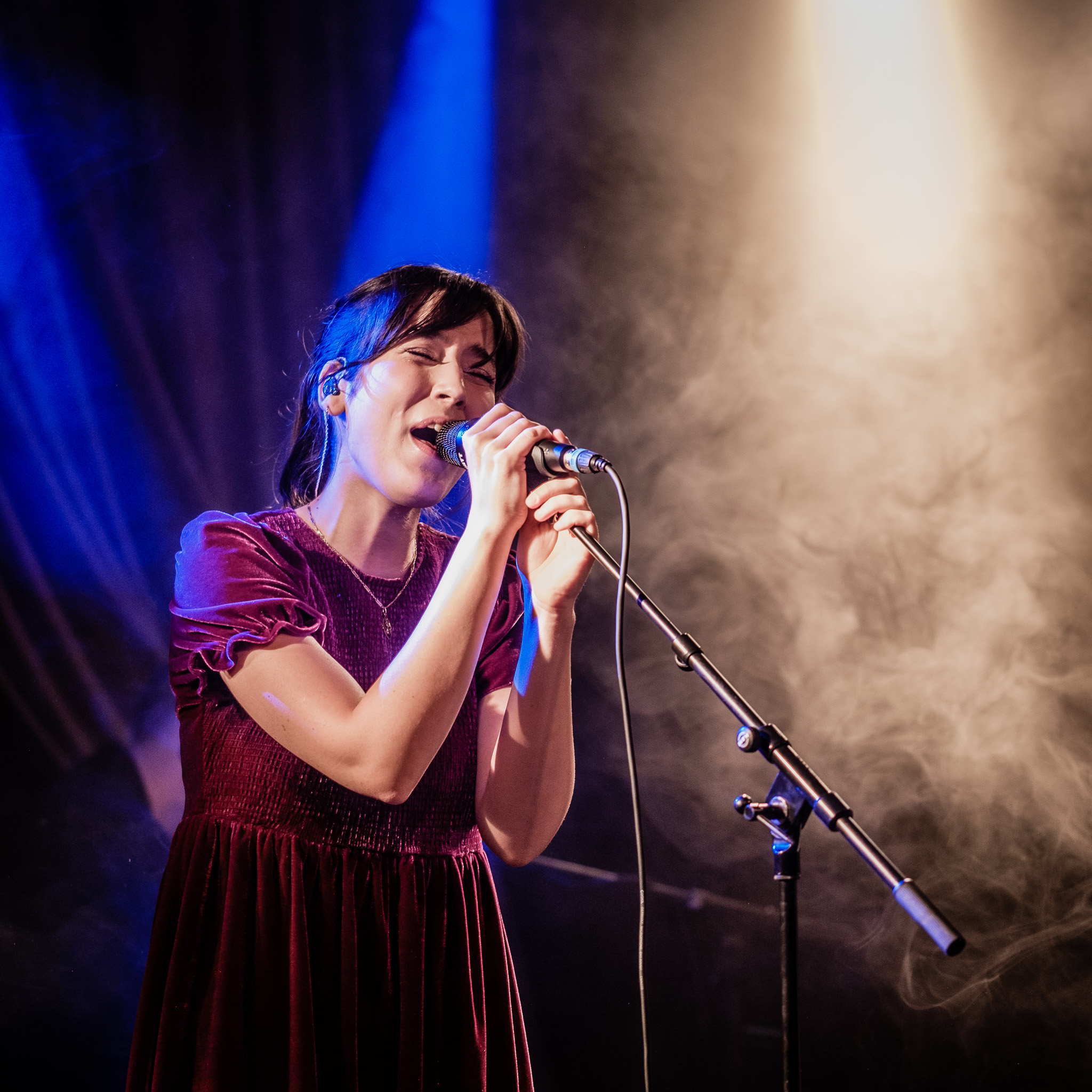

Background information
- Also known as: OSKA
- Born: Maria Burger; 22 October 1996 (age 29); Rastenfeld, Austria
- Genres: Pop
- Occupations: Singer; songwriter
- Instruments: Vocals, Guitar
- Years active: ~2014 – present
- Label: Nettwerk
- Website: goodoldoska.com

Maria Burger (born 22 October 1996), known professionally as Oska (stylized in all caps), is an Austrian singer and songwriter.

== Career ==
After graduating from high school, the then 18-year-old Oska went to Vienna to do street music. On her mother's advice, she also studied pop and jazz singing there. In mid-2020, she signed her first record deal with the Canadian label Nettwerk. With her debut EP "Honeymoon Phase" (2021), she won the "Best Sound" recording studio award at the Amadeus Austrian Music Awards in April 2022. A few months earlier, she had released her debut album "My world, My love, Paris". She accompanied, among others, Milow, Tom Odell, Stu Larsen, HAEVN and Matt Simons on tour. In August 2024 she will appear as the opening act for Coldplay in Vienna's Ernst-Happel-Stadion for four days.

== Personal life ==
Oska grew up with her four older siblings in Rastenfeld, Lower Austria (Krems-Land District). The inspiration for her stage name came from her eldest brother "Oskar", with whom she also wrote her first song. She taught herself to play the guitar in her youth.

== Discography ==
=== Studio albums ===
- My world, My love, Paris (2022)
- Refined Believer (set to come out June 2025)

=== Extended plays ===
- Honeymoon Phase (2021)
- It’s Normal to Shiver (2022)
- Live at TV Noir (2023)

=== Singles ===
- 2020: Come Home
- 2020: Distant Universe (Live Acoustic Session)
- 2020: Honeymoon Phase / Wide Awake & Dreaming
- 2021: In the Bleak Midwinter
- 2022: Hallucinating (It's Normal to Shiver Version)
- 2022: Too Nobody (It's Normal to Shiver Version)
- 2022: Misunderstood (It's Normal to Shiver Version)
- 2023: pretty by night (from the Amazon Original Motion Picture "Silver and the Book of Dreams")
- 2024: Like a Song
- 2024: April May July
- 2024: Forever Blue
- 2024: Maybe I Love You
- 2024: It Happens Either Way
- 2024: The Final Straw
- 2025: With Love, Your Clementine
- 2025: Gloria (set to come out May 2025)

== Awards ==
- 2020: XA – Export Award at Waves Vienna
- 2022: Tonstudiopreis „Best Sound“ at the Amadeus Austrian Music Awards for „Honeymoon Phase“
- 2023: Music Moves Europe Award (MME)
- 2024: NÖN-Leopold in the category "Kultur"
- 2025: Amadeus Awards 2025: award in the category Alternative

== Tours ==
=== Headlining ===
==== Forever Blue Tour ====
Date	City	Country	Venue	Opener
2024
26. September 2024	Salzburg	Austria	Argekultur	Doppelfinger
27. September 2024	Dornbirn	Austria	Spielboden	Doppelfinger
28. September 2024	Vöcklabruck	Austria	OKH	Doppelfinger
3. October 2024	Waidhofen an der Ybbs	Austria	Plenkersaal	Doppelfinger
4. October 2024	Innsbruck	Austria	Die Bäckerei	Doppelfinger
5. October 2024	Linz	Austria	Posthof	Doppelfinger
10. October 2024	St. Pölten	Austria	Bühne im Hof	Doppelfinger
11. October 2024	Klagenfurt	Austria	Kammerlichspiele	Doppelfinger
12. October 2024	Graz	Austria	Orpheum Extra	Doppelfinger
14. October 2024	Prague	Czech Republic	Cross Club	Doppelfinger
15. October 2024; (cancelled, due to illness)	Warsaw	Poland	Bardzo Bardzo	Doppelfinger
16. October 2024	Berlin	Germany	Privatclub	Doppelfinger
18. October 2024	Copenhagen	Denmark	Vega (Ideal Bar)	Doppelfinger
19. October 2024	Flensburg	Germany	Kühlhaus	Doppelfinger
21. October 2024	Amsterdam	Netherlands	Paradiso	Doppelfinger
22. October 2024	Groningen	Netherlands	Lutherse Kerk	Doppelfinger
23. October 2024	Cologne	Germany	Jaki	Doppelfinger
26. October 2024	London	United Kingdom	The Courtyard Theatre	Doppelfinger
27. October 2024	Paris	France	Supersonic Records	Doppelfinger
28. October 2024	Brussels	Belgium	Continental	Doppelfinger
30. October 2024	Zurich	Switzerland	Papiersaal	Doppelfinger
31. October 2024	Munich	Germany	Strom	Doppelfinger
1. November 2024	Dresden	Germany	Club Puschkin	Doppelfinger
22. November 2024	Krems	Austria	Kino im Kesselhaus	Doppelfinger
23. November 2024	Mistelbach	Austria	Kronen Kino	Doppelfinger
22. April 2025	Vienna	Austria	Konzerthaus	Doppelfinger

==== Refined Believer Tour ====
Date	City	Country	Venue	Opener
2025				
22. Mai 2025	Vienna	Austria	Bank Austria Kunstforum	nicht bekannt
11. July 2025	Gmunden	Austria	Salzkammergut Festwochen	nicht bekannt
12. July 2025	Feldkirch	Austria	Poolbar Festival	nicht bekannt
21. November 2025	Berlin	Germany	Prachtwerk	nicht bekannt
23. November 2025	Hamburg	Germany	Nochtwache	nicht bekannt
26. November 2025	Hannover	Germany	Kulturzentrum Pavillon	nicht bekannt
27. November 2025	Amsterdam	Netherlands	Cinetol	nicht bekannt
12. March 2026	Salzburg	Austria	Argekultur	nicht bekannt
13. March 2026	Munich	Germany	Milla	nicht bekannt
19. March 2026	Linz	Austria	Posthof	nicht bekannt
20. March 2026	Dornbirn	Austria	Spielboden	nicht bekannt
21. March 2026	Graz	Austria	Orpheum	nicht bekannt
22. May 2026	Vienna	Austria	Arena	nicht bekannt
