= Skygolpe =

Italian visual artist

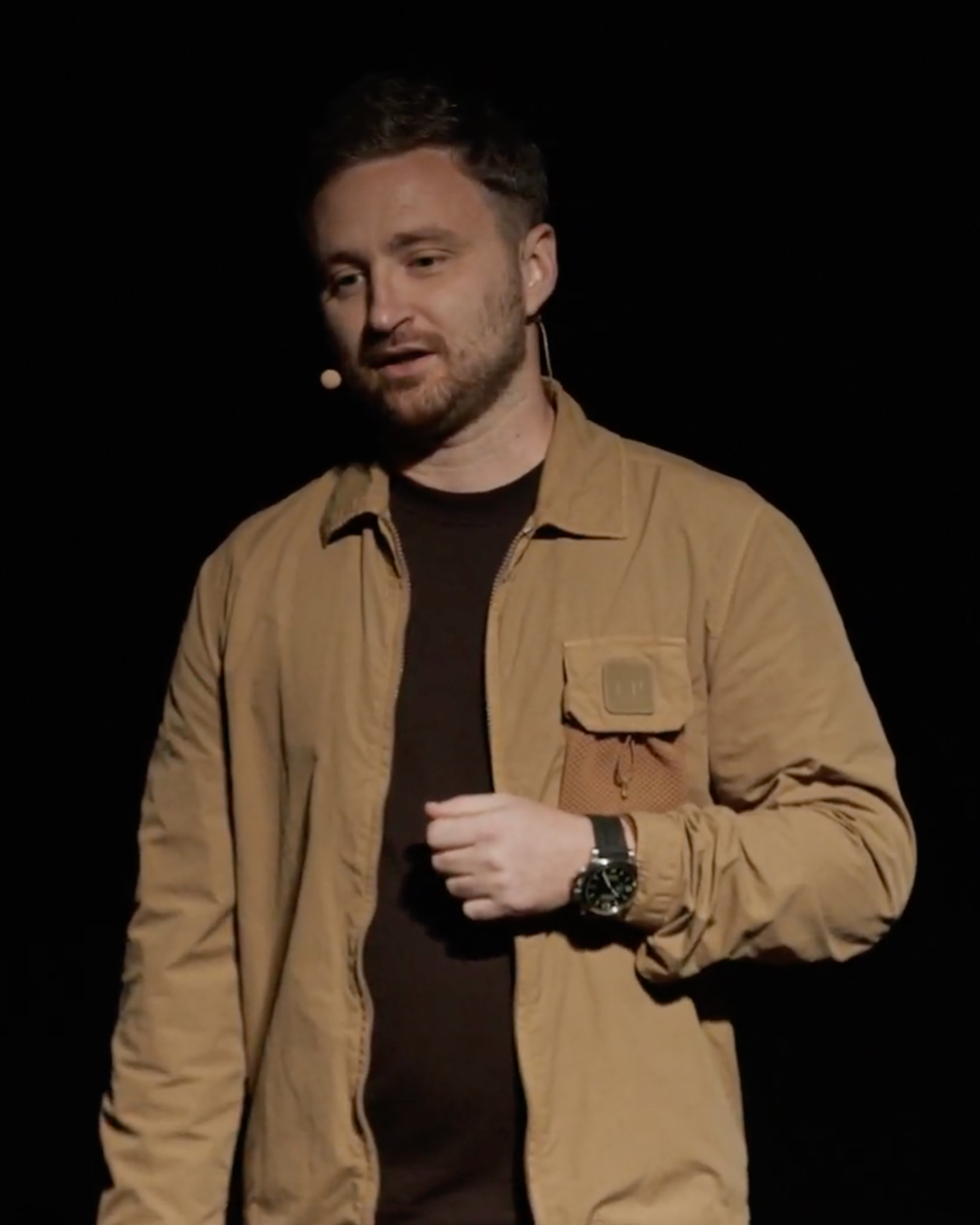
- Skygolpe speaking at NFT in Europe, Théâtre du Gymnase, Paris, 17 September 2022
- Born: 1986 (age 39–40)
- Known for: Digital art; non-fungible tokens; painting; installation

Skygolpe (born 1986) is an Italian visual artist whose practice spans digital art, painting, photography and installation. He is noted for faceless portraiture and for works that bridge physical and digital media. In July 2022, Christie's sold an NFT certificate linked to his painting PX4826E; Italian press described it as the auction house's first sale of an NFT of a physical artwork. He has since achieved an auction record at Christie's Hong Kong.

== Career ==
Skygolpe gained broader media attention in Italy in 2021, when Sette (Corriere della Sera) profiled his work and approach to crypto art.

In July 2022, Christie's sold the NFT certificate representing the ownership of his painting PX4826E for US$69,300, a sale widely covered by the Italian press.

In November 2023–January 2024, Foundry in Dubai presented his solo exhibition Third Dimension, produced by Valuart and curated by Giuseppe Moscatello, which brought together physical canvases from the series Paint on Pixel, AI photographic works and digital pieces.

In May–June 2025, he realized the public art project BLACKOUT in Milan, a series of large-format interventions across the city that combined enigmatic textual slogans with AI-generated imagery, prompting public debate on identity and technology. The artist discussed his practice and themes in a 2025 interview with Sky TG24.

== Work and themes ==
Commentators have linked Skygolpe’s practice to a sustained inquiry into identity and the interaction between physical and digital media. Vanity Fair Italia highlighted his faceless portraiture and hybrid method mixing paint, photography and digital processes, while Artnet News framed his work as “collapsing the boundaries between digital and physical art” around the Paint on Pixel series.

== Projects ==
- 2025: BLACKOUT, citywide public installation, Milan, Italy.

=== Exhibitions ===
- 19–21 December 2024: Paint on Pixel, 48 Hester Street, New York (solo).
- 2023–2024: Third Dimension, Foundry, Dubai (solo).

== Selected auctions ==
- 21 July 2022: PX4826E (NFT certificate plus physical work), Christie’s Online, sold for US$69,300.
- 29 May 2024: PX8371S, Christie’s Hong Kong, price realised HKD 1,008,000 (reported as a record for the artist).
