= Gianluigi Fazio =

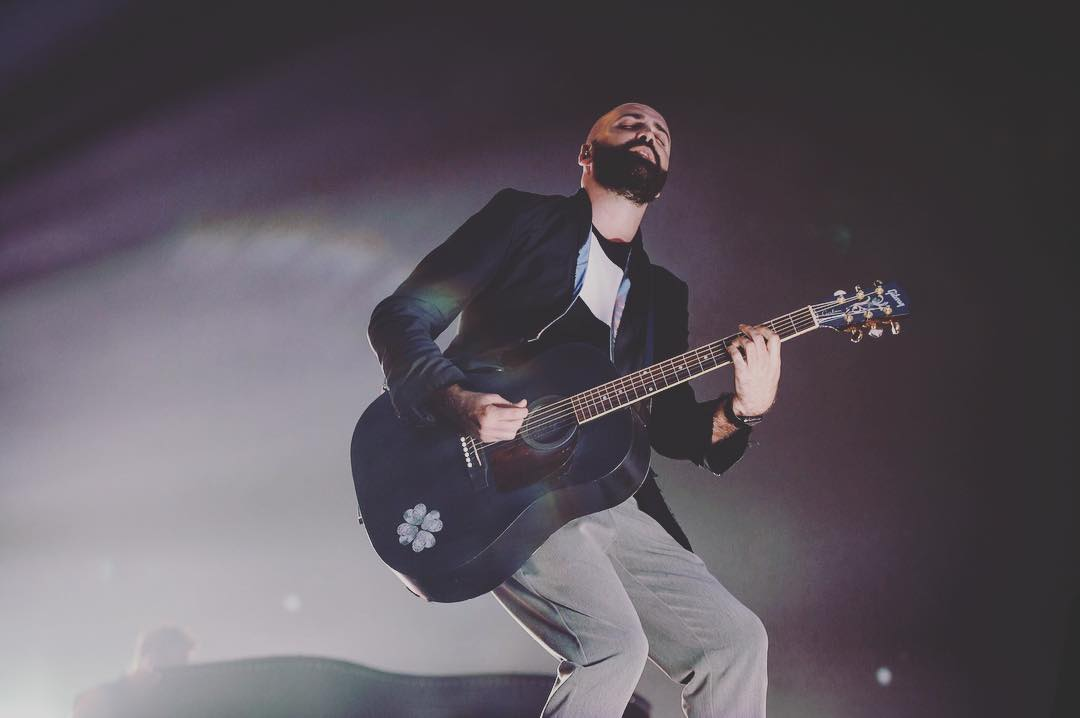
- Gianluigi Fazio performing during the Pausini Stadi – Simili Tour 2016 at San Siro, Milan

Background information
- Born: Gianluigi Fazio; 14 November 1978 (age 47); Busto Arsizio, Italy
- Origin: Italy
- Occupations: Singer-songwriter, record producer, multi-instrumentalist
- Years active: 2000s–present
- Awards: David di Donatello (Best Original Song, 2025); Latin Grammy (Best Traditional Pop Vocal Album, 2018)

Gianluigi Fazio (born 14 November 1978) is an Italian singer-songwriter, record producer and multi-instrumentalist. He is known for collaborations as songwriter and producer with Laura Pausini, Dargen D'Amico, Marco Mengoni, Nek, Elodie and Eros Ramazzotti. In 2025 he won the David di Donatello for Best Original Song with "Aria!", composed together with Margherita Vicario, Dade, Edwyn Roberts and Andrea Bonomo for the film Gloria!.

== Biography ==
Active professionally since the late 2000s, he joined Laura Pausini’s band as backing vocalist and multi-instrumentalist on the World Tour 2009. With Pausini he continued performing on the Inedito World Tour (2011–2012), The Greatest Hits World Tour (2013–2015, including Australia and Russia), Simili/Pausini Stadi (2016) and Fatti sentire – World Wide Tour (2018), including concerts at the Circo Massimo.

In studio, he worked with Eros Ramazzotti as backing vocalist on the albums Noi (2012) and Noi due (2019). In 2018 he joined Cesare Cremonini’s band for Cremonini Live 2018 as backing vocalist and acoustic guitarist, returning for Live Stadi 2022 and Indoor 2022.

== Selected works ==
=== Songwriter / composer ===
Year	Song	Performer	Album / Event	Notes	Ref
2013	"Invisibili"	Ape Escape	X Factor 7 / single	Co-writer	
2013	"Io scelgo te"	Alessandro Casillo	single	Co-writer	
2015	"Fatti avanti amore"	Nek	Prima di parlare	Co-writer	
2015	"Nati insieme"	Nek	Prima di parlare	Co-writer	
2015	"Invisibile"	Nek	Prima di parlare	Co-writer	
2016	"To stjerner"	Muri & Mario	Melodi Grand Prix 2016	Danish national final	
2017	"The Payback Song"	Frederik Leopold	single	Co-writer	
2018	"Non è detto"	Laura Pausini	Fatti sentire / Hazte sentir	Co-writer	
2018	"Voglio"	Marco Mengoni	Atlantico	Co-writer	
2018	"Tra noi è infinita"	Federica Carta	Molto più di un film	Co-writer	
2018	"Felice"	Sister Cristina	Felice	Co-writer	
2018	"Grandi insieme"	Sister Cristina	Felice	Co-writer	
2019	"Le Olimpiadi tutti i giorni"	Paola Turci	Viva da morire	Co-writer	
2019	"Il mio gioco preferito"	Nek	Il mio gioco preferito – Parte prima	Co-writer	
2019	"Musica sotto le bombe"	Nek	Il mio gioco preferito – Parte prima	Co-writer	
2020	"Freaky!"	Senhit	Eurovision Song Contest 2020 (San Marino)	Co-writer	
2020	"Superbowl"	Elodie	This Is Elodie	Co-writer	
2022	"Dove si balla"	Dargen D'Amico	Sanremo Music Festival 2022	Co-writer; 3× Platinum (FIMI)	
2022	"Ubriaco di te"	Dargen D'Amico	Nei sogni nessuno è monogamo	Co-writer	
2022	"Onde"	Margherita Vicario	single	Co-writer (prod. Dade)	
2022	"Sinfonia della distruzione"	Pyrex	single	Co-writer	
2022	"Closer"	Emma Muscat	I Am Emma	Co-writer	
2023	"L'infinito più o meno"	Francesco Renga & Nek	single	Co-writer	
2024	"Frammenti di universo"	Il Volo	Ad Astra	Co-writer	
2024	"Onda alta"	Dargen D'Amico	Ciao America / Sanremo 2024	Co-writer	
2024	"Daisy"	Benji & Fede	Rewind	Co-writer	
2025	"Aria!"	Margherita Vicario	Gloria! (soundtrack)	David di Donatello 2025 – Best Original Song	
2025	"CREDO"	Mondo Marcio	Credo	Co-writer and co-producer	
2025	"Nullatenente"	Dargen D'Amico feat. Gabry Ponte, Massimo Pericolo & Jake La Furia	single	Co-writer	
2025	"promessa."	Rkomi	decrescendo.	Co-writer	
2025	"il ritmo delle cose."	Rkomi	Sanremo 2025	Co-writer	

=== Producer / sound engineer ===
- Il mio gioco preferito – Parte prima (2019) – Nek, co-production, recording and mixing.
- "Ubriaco di te" (2022) – Dargen D'Amico, produced with Edwyn Roberts.

== Tours ==
Cesare Cremonini

- Cremonini Live 2018 – backing vocals, acoustic guitar.
- Stadi 2018
- Live Stadi 2022
- Indoor 2022

Dargen D'Amico

- Summer Tour 2022 – backing vocals, keyboards, guitar.

Laura Pausini

- World Tour 2009
- Inedito World Tour (2011–2012)
- The Greatest Hits World Tour (2013–2015, incl. Australia and Russia)
- Gira Grandes Éxitos (Mexico, 2014)
- Pausini Stadi (2016)
- Similares World Tour (2016)
- Fatti sentire – World Wide Tour (2018)

Laura Pausini & Biagio Antonacci

- Stadi 2019

== Music videos and direction ==
Alongside songwriting and production, Fazio co-directed several music videos with his brother Giorgio Fazio (creative director and filmmaker).

- Laura Pausini – Mi tengo (2012) — directed by Gianluigi and Giorgio Fazio ; premiered on TGcom24.
- Les Enfants – Dammi un nome (2014) — directed by Gianluigi and Giorgio Fazio ; premiered on Rolling Stone Italia.
- Il Fieno – Del conseguimento della maggiore età (2015) — directed by Gianluigi and Giorgio Fazio; published on Italian portals such as Rockit.

== Personal life ==
Fazio is in a relationship with Sofia Sacchetti, a clinical psychologist and researcher at Sigmund Freud University in Milan. In 2025 the couple had a son, Lucio.

== Awards and recognition ==
- David di Donatello for Best Original Song (2025): "Aria!" (with Margherita Vicario, Dade, Edwyn Roberts, Andrea Bonomo).
- Latin Grammy Award for Best Traditional Pop Vocal Album (2018) – contribution as songwriter on Fatti sentire by Laura Pausini.
