= Painted face =

Painted face may refer to:

- Face painting
- Jing (Chinese opera), also known as painted face, a principal role type in Chinese opera
- Painted Faces, a 1988 Hong Kong film about a Chinese opera school
- The Painted Faces, a 1960s American rock band

== See also ==
- Paint Your Face, a 2009 studio album by French recording artist Sliimy
