= One Step Closer =

One Step Closer may refer to:

- One Step Closer (band), an American melodic hardcore band
- "One Step Closer" (Mutant X), a 2003 television episode

== Albums ==
- One Step Closer (The Doobie Brothers album) or the title song, 1980
- One Step Closer (Gavin Christopher album), 1986
- One Step Closer (Marta Sánchez album), English-language version of Azabache, 1997
- One Step Closer (The String Cheese Incident album) or the title song, 2005
- One Step Closer (Sylvia album) or the title song, 1985
- One Step Closer (EP), by Saint Lu, 2004
- One Step Closer, by the Dells, or the title song, 1984
- One Step Closer, by Heinz Winckler, or the title song, 2002

== Songs ==
- "One Step Closer" (Linkin Park song), 2000
- "One Step Closer" (S Club Juniors song), 2002; covered by American Juniors, 2003
- "One Step Closer" (U2 song), 2004
- "One Step Closer", by Asia from Asia, 1982
- "One Step Closer", by Bon Jovi from Lost Highway, 2007
- "One Step Closer", by R. Kelly from Write Me Back, 2012
- "One Step Closer", by Simple Minds from Cry, 2002
- "One Step Closer" by Leona Lewis, 2023
