= Saint Lu =

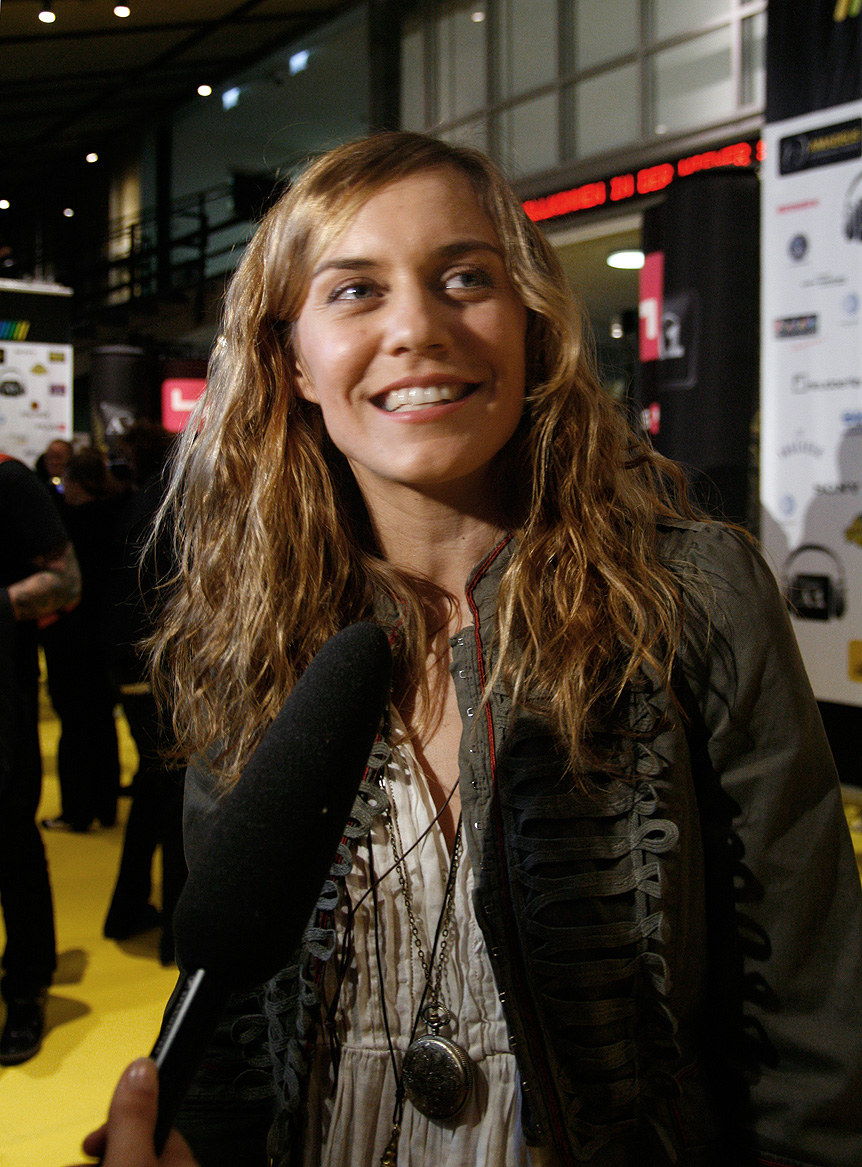
- Saint Lu in 2010

Background information
- Also known as: Luise
- Born: Luise Gruber; 27 June 1982 (age 43); Wels, Austria
- Genres: Rock; blues rock; soul
- Occupations: Singer; songwriter
- Instruments: Vocals; guitar
- Years active: 2003–present
- Website: www.saintlu.com

Luise Gruber (born 27 June 1982 in Wels, Austria), better known by her stage name Saint Lu is an Austrian singer and songwriter. She currently lives and works in Berlin, Germany.

== Recording career ==
Luise Gruber was a member of many short-living bands, including the school band "Joe Graham", the Big Band Neuhofen the show band "Connection" and the rock band "Djaleb". She has also mentioned in an interview that she has been a member of several metal and jazz bands.

In 1998, she was part of a rock band called Luise Gruber & Zentao, which was later renamed Centao. Soon after the recording of the first demos, Gruber left the band. Two demos were recorded—"Pop 33, 34," a split tape with the band "Sick Orange," and "Promo '000."

In 2003, she was a part of the casting show "Starmania", where she ended tenth. She has recorded some cover songs for the compilation albums of the show. Soon after Starmania, she started working as a singing teacher at the music school "CreatiV".

In 2005, she has released her debut EP "One Step Closer" via "AGENTUR NETZWERK records" under the name Luise. The EP includes three tracks, two of which were written by Gruber ("Why Are You Under My Skin?" and "Left to Heaven") and the third one (Amazing Grace) is a traditional gospel song produced by The Alphabet. The EP saw no success. It is currently out of print and cannot be found at the regular stores or as a digital download. "Why Are You Under My Skin" was planned to be released as the first single from the EP.

In 2009 Warner Bros. Records signed her under the pseudonym Saint Lu. Her debut album "Saint Lu" was released on 20 November 2009. It includes songs, written or co-written by Gruber, a mixture of 70s Blues and Rock music. Critically acclaimed, the album failed to get into the top 20 in Austria, charting on place 30. Two singles were released after the release of the album: Don't Miss Your Own Life and Here I stand. In 2010 she performed two songs for the Austrian comedy series "Wir Sind Kaiser", called "Kaiserhymne" and "Heroes".

Gruber's second album, called "2", was recorded in 2012, and scheduled for release in early 2013. The album is noteworthy for its music direction change, from the blues and rock of its predecessor toward a more soul-oriented aesthetic. One of the songs from her second album, called "Falling For Your Love" written by Gruber with Jimmy Messer and Roxanne Seeman, was premiered on YouTube. Luise Gruber is taking part of the Eurovision Song Contest for 2013 with another song from her yet to be released second album, called Craving, which was released on 1 February 2013 as a digital download. A third song, "No One Loves You Like I Do", is available as a free download on her official website. Gruber confirmed on her official Facebook page, that her new album "2" and was released on 15 February 2013.

== Influences ==
Gruber's biggest musical influences are Janis Joplin and Jimi Hendrix along with other 60s and 70s Blues/Rock artists.

== Awards ==
In 2011 Saint Lu won a European Border Breakers Award at the European Border Breakers Award Ceremony at the Eurosonic Noorderslag Festival in the Netherlands for her international success.

== Discography ==
=== Albums ===
- Saint Lu (2009) No. 30 AT, No. 84 CH, No. 79 GER
- 2 (2013) #42 GER

=== EPs ===
- One Step Closer (2005) – Debut EP under the name Luise
- Acoustic (2010) – includes acoustic versions of "Don't Miss Your Own Life" and "Memory"
- 2 (Acoustic EP) (2013) – a six track EP, including acoustic versions of songs from the "2" era

=== Singles ===
Year	Title	Chart Positions			Album
Year	Title	AT Singles	GER Singles	CH Singles	Album
2005	"Why Are You Under My Skin?"	—	—	—	One Step Closer
2009	"Don't Miss Your Own Life"	42	80	—	Saint Lu
2010	"Here I Stand"	34	—	—	Saint Lu
2010	"Rockstar Car"	—	—	—	Saint Lu
2013	"Craving"	—	88	—	2

=== Other songs ===
Luise Gruber & Zentao (also known as Centao)

- “Hunt” – 4:02 (1999)
- “I've Got Your Number” – 3:51 (1999)
- “I Feel High” (2000)
- “Nothing Doing” (2000)
- “I'm Not Your Wench” (2000)

Starmania

- “Family Portrait” – Pink cover, for the compilation album Starmania – Die Neue Generation II
- “First Cut Is The Deepest” – Rod Stewart cover, for the compilation album Starmania – Die Neue Generation II
- “Hoamweh nach B.A.” – Ausseer Hardbradler cover, for the compilation album “Starmania – Die Neue Generation – Best Of Qualification”
- “Thank God It's Christmas” – from the compilation album “Starmania – Die Neue Generation – Xmas hits”
- “In The Shadows” – The Rasmus cover, for the compilation album Starmania – Die Neue Generation I
