= Meskerem Mees =

Belgian singer and songwriter (born 1999)

- Born: 15 July 1999 (age 26); Addis Ababa, Ethiopia
- Occupations: Singer; songwriter

Meskerem Mees (born 15 July 1999) is a Belgian singer and songwriter.

== Early life ==
Mees was born in Addis Ababa, Ethiopia on 15 July 1999. She came to Merendree near Deinze, Belgium, through adoption when she was ten months old. Her first name means "new beginning", which refers to 1 September, the first day of the Ethiopian New Year. After high school in Ghent and MUDA Atheneum for Performing Arts in Evergem, she added an extra year at Vestjyllands Højskole in Denmark where she developed her creative skills in painting, music, cooking, dance and singing.

== Career ==
In 2013, Mees participated in Who will be Junior? and had Brahim as coach, although she did not win the competition. In 2019, she won the Sound Track stage competition. A year later she released the debut single Joe, which ended up at #1 in De Afrekening. She also participated in Humo's Rock Rally 2020, which she also won. In 2021 she won the Montreux Jazz Talent Awards and in 2022 the Music Moves Europe Award (Grand Jury Award). In 2024 she was winner of the Golden Afro Artistic Awards, category Musique. Meskerem Mees is also the name under which the singer-songwriter initially performed with cellist Febe Lazou and later with cellist Frederik Daelemans.

Since 2023, Mees has been collaborating on the performance Exit Above by theater maker Anne Teresa De Keersmaeker. When the latter goes looking for music for a new performance, she takes a detour to guitarist Jean-Marie Aerts. De Keersmaeker felt that a female voice is missing and she then contacted Mees, who not only wants to sing but also compose (together with Jean-Marie Aerts and Carlos Garbin) and dance with the dancers of Rosas. The starting point for the music is Walking Blues by Robert Johnson and in the performance “walking as a primal movement and the blues as a musical origin come together”. Exit Above had a world premiere on 31 May 2023 at the Théâtre National Wallonie-Bruxelles, and has also been shown at the Volksoper Wien, the Concertgebouw Brugge, the Festival d'Avignon, the Haus der Berliner Festspiele, the Kaaitheater, Opera Ghent, De Singel, Theater Rotterdam, and other theaters in Norway, Sweden, Italy, Germany and France. In 2024, the production is set to travel to the Hasselt Cultural Center, the Netherlands, Germany, France and Spain for various performances.

== Discography ==
=== Studio albums ===
- Julius (2021)
- Caesar (2022)
