= One Step Closer (EP) =

EP by Luise Gruber
- Released: 2004
- Recorded: 2003–2004
- Genre: Rock/pop
- Length: 10:23
- Label: AGENTUR NETZWERK
- Producer: The Alphabeth

Saint Lu album chronology
One Step Closer (2004)	Saint Lu (2009)

One Step Closer is the official debut release by the Austrian blues-rock singer Luise Gruber, better known as Saint Lu, released mononymously under the name Luise. It was released by the Austrian independent label "Agentur Netzwerk" in 2004. The EP contains three tracks, two of which were written by Gruber herself. The third one is a cover version of the traditional gospel song "Amazing Grace". Although the name of the EP is "One Step Closer", it does not contain a song, named "One Step Closer". Gruber mentioned in an interview, that she called the EP this way because that is "one step closer" in her career as a musician. The EP differs from the sounding of her studio albums Saint Lu and 2, showing a more pop-rock oriented sound. The EP saw no success. It is currently out of print and cannot be found at the regular stores or as a digital download.

== Track listing ==
No.	Title	Lyrics	Length
1.	"Why Are You Under My Skin?"	Luise Gruber	4:01
2.	"Left To Heaven"	Luise Gruber	3:18
3.	"Amazing Grace"	traditional - John Newton	3:04
