= Giorgio Fazio =

Italian creative director, filmmaker and electronic music producer

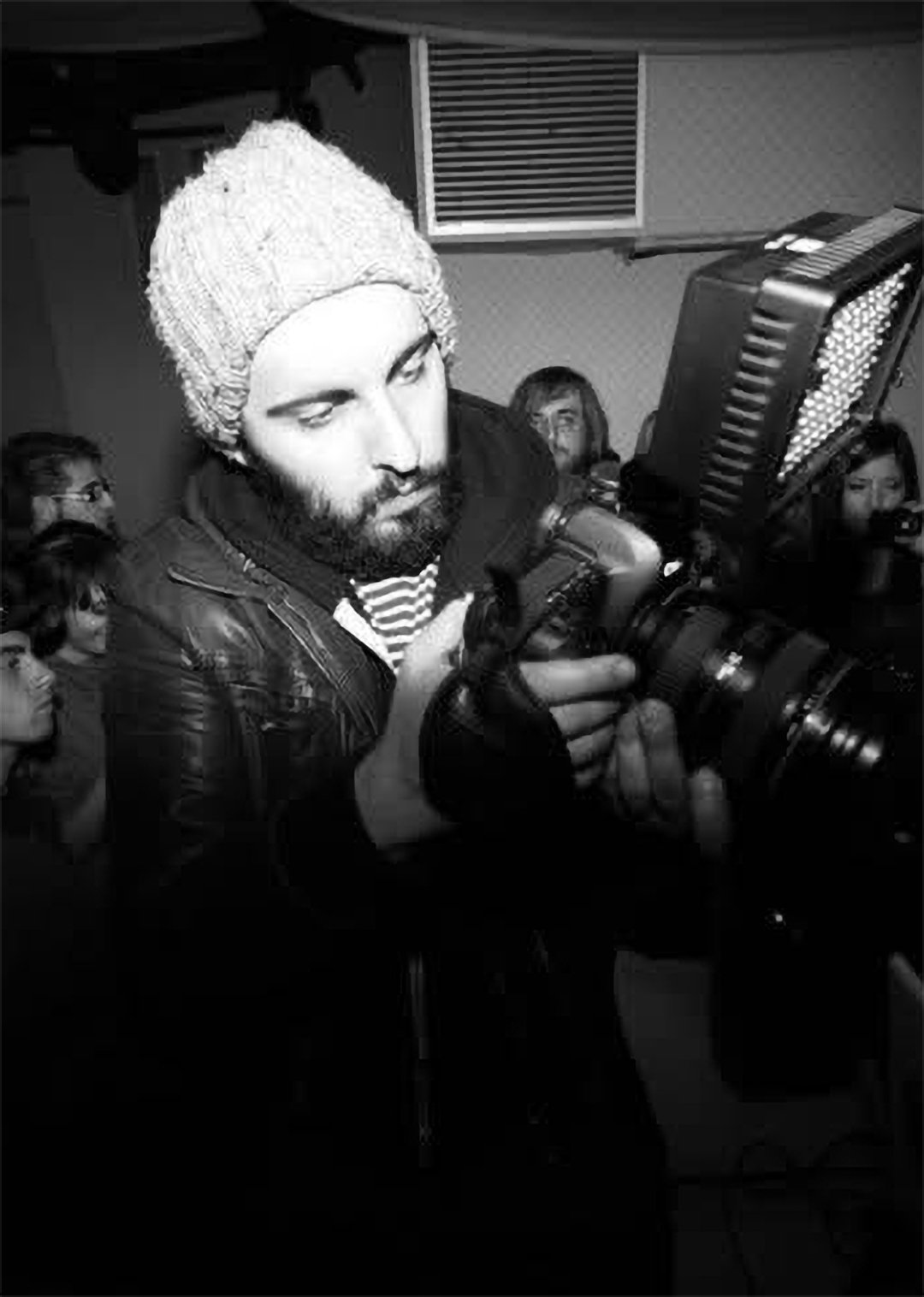
- Fazio at Code Club Busto Arsizio, 2009
- Born: 9 June 1989 (age 37); Catania, Italy
- Occupations: Creative director, filmmaker, music producer
- Years active: 2010–present

Giorgio Fazio (born 9 June 1989 in Catania, Italy) is an Italian creative director, filmmaker and electronic music producer based in Paradiso, Switzerland. He is the Creative Director of the Swiss art–technology company Valuart and is known for combining visual direction, contemporary art, and experimental electronic sound. His work bridges digital aesthetics, fashion and music, exploring the dialogue between human perception and technology.

== Career ==
Fazio began his career in Milan between 2010 and 2012, collaborating with Amnesia Milano and its media partner House of Wronga, filming acts such as Nina Kraviz, Tale of Us, and Skrillex. In 2012 he co-directed Laura Pausini’s music video Mi tengo from the album Inedito. He later directed projects featured in Rolling Stone Italia.

Since 2021, he has been the Creative Director at Valuart, based in Lugano Paradiso.

In 2025, Fazio released his electronic EP Nothing But Simulation, a conceptual project inspired by Nick Bostrom’s simulation hypothesis, marking his official debut as a solo producer. The work explores the tension between digital and human perception and received positive reviews from outlets such as Magnetic Magazine.
