= Ewert and The Two Dragons =

Estonian musical group

Ewert and the Two Dragons
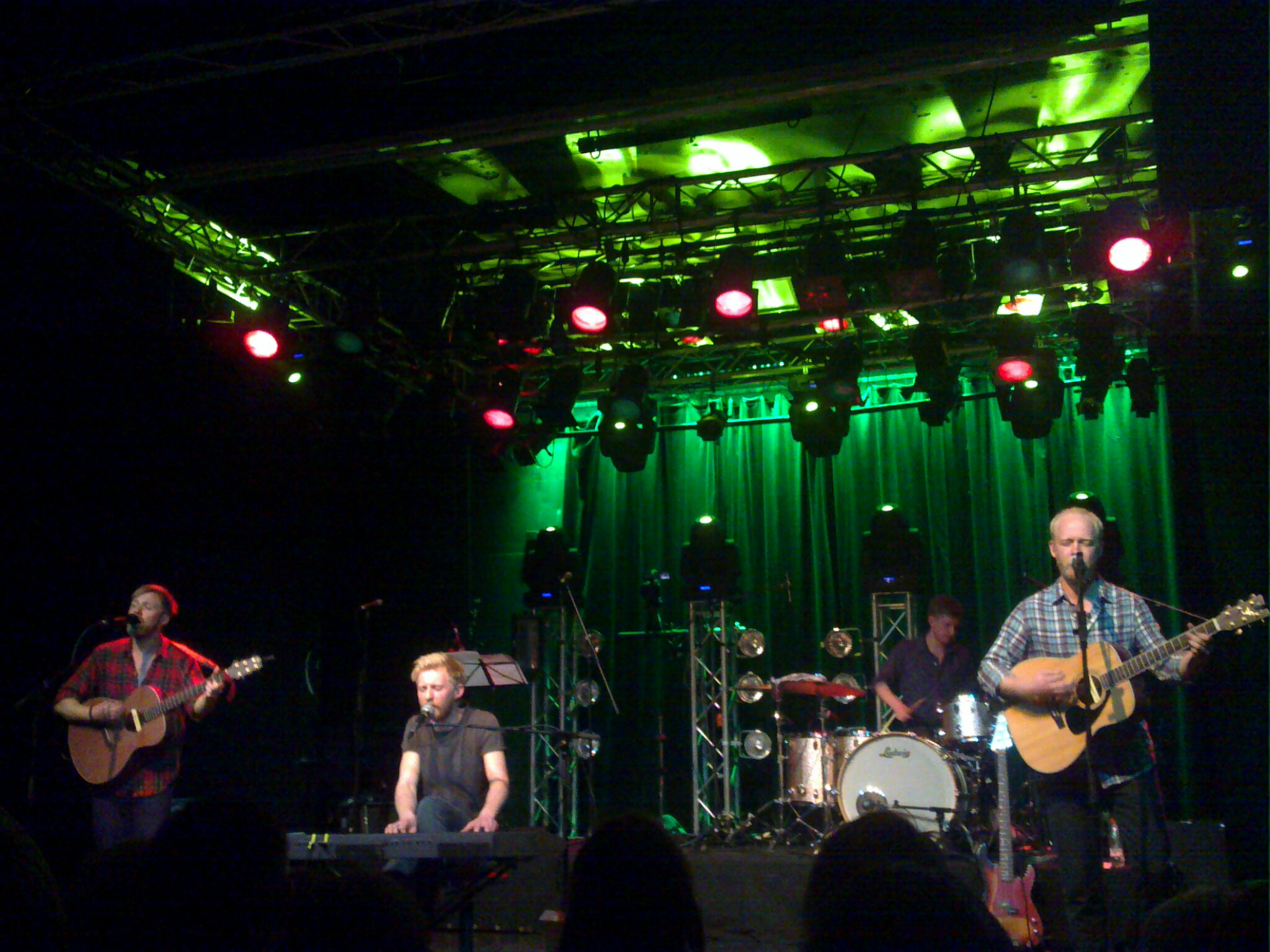
- Estonian band Ewert and the Two Dragons performing live in Helsinki, Finland (2012)

Background information
- Origin: Tallinn, Estonia
- Genres: Indie folk; baroque pop; indie pop
- Years active: 2009–2024
- Labels: Warner Bros. Records; Sire Records; Talitres; Made In Baltics; I Love You Records
- Members: Ewert Sundja; Erki Pärnoja; Kristjan Kallas; Ivo Etti
- Website: ewertandthetwodragons.com

Ewert and the Two Dragons were an Estonian indie-rock band. The line-up consisted of vocalist Ewert Sundja, guitarist Erki Pärnoja, drummer Kristjan Kallas, and bassist Ivo Etti. Their debut album The Hills Behind the Hills was released in 2009. The follow-up Good Man Down was recorded at the beginning of 2011 and was released in April on I Love You Records. The group's third album, Circles, was released in 2015 on Sire Records. They have gained recognition in the Baltic states as well as in several other European countries.

== History ==
Ewert Sundja, Erki Pärnoja and Kristjan Kallas are friends who first started playing together in 2008. The band name came from a movie that Sundja was a fan of. After a while the band got used to it and decided to stick with it. Although the name states that there are three people in the group, the band describes one of the dragons to have two heads. For the first concerts, they mostly played covers of the Police, Radiohead, Jeff Buckley and others. Soon the trio decided to use their own material which resulted in the release of their debut album The Hills Behind the Hills. The album was recorded in three days at the summer cottage of Ewert Sundja's in-laws and was released in October 2009. When they started to perform live, Ivo Etti joined the line-up.

In May 2010, the band started their first Baltic tour and gave concerts across the Baltics — in Riga, Sigulda, Liepāja and Klaipėda. In May 2010, the band was the opening act of TEDxTallinn conference. On 17 July 2010, the band gave a concert at the Positivus.

On 25 September, the band signed a record deal with Latvian indie label I Love You Records. Second album Good Man Down was released on 5 April 2011 and it has since then received critical acclaim in Estonia, Latvia, Finland, France and Sweden. The album was one of the best-selling records in Estonia in 2011.

The first single off the album, "(In the End) There's Only Love" was popular in all three Baltic countries and became a breaking point in the band's career. It was premiered in Estonia by Mart Normet on Raadio 2 and in Latvia by Toms Grevins from Radio 101. The track was picked up by Estonian commercial radio stations in mid-2011 and peaked Uuno Radio Top 25 chart in September. Renārs Kaupers from Brainstorm mentioned his fondness for the group in many of his interviews and in August 2011 Ewert and the Two Dragons played the song together with Brainstorm at the Freedom Song event at the Tallinn Song Festival Grounds.

Since 2011, Ewert and the Two Dragons have performed in various European countries, also at the festivals like Popkomm (Germany), Waves Vienna (Austria), Eurosonic Festival 2012 (Netherlands) and Lost In Music (Finland). In November 2011, they had sold out shows at the Nokia Concert Hall in Tallinn and Palladium in Riga.

Ewert and the Two Dragons were the winners of the Tallinn Music Week / Skype "Go Change the World" award of 2011. The band won three awards at the Estonian Radio2 Annual "Hit of the Year" Ceremony: Best New Act, Station's Favourite, and The Hit of the Year Award for the song "Good Man Down". Estonian National Television station voted "Good Man Down" as the best video of 2011. The band was nominated and won five Estonian Music Awards in 2012. The awards included Best Band, Best Video, Song of the Year, Best Rock Album and Album of the Year.

In summer 2012 the band signed a worldwide publishing deal with BMG Rights Management Germany.

Ewert and the Two Dragons are a winner of the 2013 European Border Breakers Awards. The European Border Breakers Awards honour the best new music acts in Europe. The award ceremony takes place at the Eurosonic Noorderslag music festival in Groningen (NL).

In November 2023, they were announced as one of the semi-finalists of Eesti Laul 2024, with the song "Hold Me Now". They qualified to the final during the first round of the semi-final.

At the beginning of 2024, the group decided to disband, with final concert announced to be held July 2025.

== Members ==
- Ewert Sundja – vocals, keyboards
- Erki Pärnoja – guitar, backing vocals
- Ivo Etti – bass, acoustic guitar, backing vocals
- Kristjan Kallas – drums, percussion

Additional live members

- Aarne Ots – trumpet (2011–present)
- Johannes Kiik – trombone (2011–present)
- Indrek Varend – saxophone (2011–present)

== Discography ==
- The Hills Behind the Hills (2009)
- Good Man Down (2011)
- Circles (2015)
- Hands Around the Moon (2018)
- Live at the Arena (2021)

== Awards and nominations ==
=== Estonian Music Awards ===
Year	Nominee / work	Award	Result
2012	Good Man Down	Album of the Year	Won
2012	Good Man Down	Best Rock Album	Won
2012	"Good Man Down"	Song of the Year	Won

=== Radio 2 Hit of the Year ===
Year	Nominee / work	Award	Result
2011	"Good Man Down"	Hit of the Year	Won

=== European Border Breakers Award ===
Year	Nominee / work	Award	Result
2013	Good Man Down	EBBA	Won

=== Estonian Music Awards ===
Year	Nominee / work	Award	Result
2016	"Circles"	Rock Album of the Year	Won
