= Vittorio Grigolo =

Italian operatic tenor (born 1977)

- Grigolo in 2007

Background information
- Born: 19 February 1977 (age 49); Arezzo, Tuscany, Italy
- Occupation: Tenor
- Years active: 1990–present
- Label: Sony Classical
- Website: www.vittoriogrigolo.com

Vittorio Grigolo (pronounced [vitˈtɔːrjo ɡriˈɡɔːlo]; born 19 February 1977) is an Italian operatic and classical crossover tenor.

== Early life ==
Grigolo was born in Arezzo and raised in Rome. He began singing by the age of four. When he was nine years old he accompanied his mother to have her eyes tested and, hearing someone singing from another room, he spontaneously began his own rendition of "Ave Maria". The singer, the optician's father, was so impressed that he insisted Grigolo have an audition for the Sistine Chapel Choir as soon as possible. Young Vittorio was chosen to become part of Sistine Chapel Choir as a soloist. He then studied for five years at the Schola Puerorum at the Sistine Chapel. At age 13 he played the Pastorello in a performance of Tosca at Teatro dell'Opera di Roma, where he shared the stage with Luciano Pavarotti. He became the youngest man to perform in Milan's La Scala at age 23.

Grigolo made his debut at the Royal Opera House in 2010 as Des Grieux in Manon, going on to sing Faust, the Duke in Rigoletto, Rodolfo in La bohème, Nemorino in L'elisir d'amore, Werther, and Cavaradossi in Tosca. In August 2013 he took part in the first "Concert de Paris" on the Champ de Mars, performing before more than 800,000 spectators.

He made his role debut as Manrico in Il Trovatore in Barcelona in November 2021 and "commanded the stage".

Apart from his operatic roles, Grigolo has recorded an album of classical crossover music, In the Hands of Love (2006), which contains a cover of "If you're not the one" sung in Italian as "Se tu non sei lei" (if you are not her). He has also sung songs by Queen live in concert, including a medley of their songs at Sanremo in 2020.

== Private live ==
Vittorio Grigolo was married to Roshi Kamdar, an American art director of Iranian descent. They divorced in 2013. He then had a relationship with Nathalie Dompé, owner and manager of a family-owned pharmaceutical company. Since 2018, he has been in a relationship with Ukrainian model Stefania Seimour, with whom he had a daughter (Bianca Maria) in 2020. In January of that year, during the show All Together Now, he proposed to Stefania live on air, but they have not yet married.

== Allegations of inappropriate behavior ==
In September 2019 Grigolo was dismissed firstly by the Royal Opera House Covent Garden on the grounds of inappropriate behavior during the Royal Opera's tour in Japan. His contracts with the Metropolitan Opera were subsequently also cancelled.

== Repertory ==
- Giuseppe Verdi: Don Carlo, I due Foscari, Un ballo in maschera, Luisa Miller, Messa da Requiem, Rigoletto, La traviata, Il corsaro
- Gaetano Donizetti: L'elisir d'amore, Don Sebastiano, La favorite, Anna Bolena, Lucrezia Borgia, Lucia di Lammermoor
- Giacomo Puccini: La Bohème, Tosca, Madama Butterfly
- Charles Gounod: Faust, Roméo et Juliette
- Gioachino Rossini: Petite Messe Solennelle, Stabat Mater
- Wolfgang Amadeus Mozart: Idomeneo, Così fan tutte
- Jules Massenet: Werther, Manon
- Leonard Bernstein: West Side Story
- Jacques Offenbach: Les contes d'Hoffmann

== Awards ==
The European Commission of the EU granted Grigolo and Romano Musumarra a European Border Breakers Award, along with the record company, authors and publishers, for recording the highest sales for a debut album in 2006 within the European Union, but outside of its country of production.

=== Nominations ===
- Grammy Award 2008 for Best Musical Show Album - West Side Story

== Discography ==
=== Albums ===
Title	Details	Peak chart positions							Certifications
Title	Details	AUS	FRA	GER	NL	UK	US	US Class.	Certifications
In the Hands of Love	Released: 13 March 2006; Label: Polydor Records; Formats: Digital download, CD	24	—	—	36	6	195	2	ARIA: Gold
West Side Story	Released: 2007; Label: Decca Records; Formats: Digital download, CD	—	—	—	—	—	—	—	
Incognito	Released: 2007; Label: Sony Classical; Formats: Digital download, CD	—	—	—	—	—	—	—	
The Italian Tenor	Released: 2010; Label: Sony Classical; Formats: Digital download, CD	—	101	88	—	—	—	2	
Arrivederci	Released: 2011; Label: Sony Classical; Formats: Digital download, CD	—	—	—	—	—	—	13	
Ave Maria	Released: 2013; Label: Sony Classical; Formats: Digital download, CD	—	—	—	—	—	—	18	
The Romantic Hero	Released: 2014; Label: Sony Classical; Formats: Digital download, CD	—	—	—	—	—	—	—	
Verissimo	Released 2024 Label: Sony Classical Formats: Digital Download								
"—" denotes a recording that did not chart or was not released in that territory.

=== Singles ===
Title	Year	Album
"You Are My Miracle" (featuring Nicole Scherzinger or Katherine Jenkins)	2006	In the Hands of Love

== DVD ==
Dreams of Rome

Recorded at Hadrian's Villa in Tivoli, Italy. A live performance of tracks from his album, as well as a few additional pieces. The DVD was recorded specifically for the Great Performances series on PBS TV USA.

Grigolo plays Cassio in Giuseppe Verdi Otello recorded at Gran Teatre del Liceu Barcelona 2006

== Appearances ==
- 'Cosi' in Miss Universe 2006 at Shrine Auditorium in Los Angeles, California, United States of America on July 23, 2006.
- 'Camillo de Rossillon' in La vedova allegra at Roma Opera House, Rome December 2007
- 'Rodolfo' in La bohème at the Kennedy Center Opera House, Washington, D.C. September 2007 and at Zurich Opera House, October/November 2009.
- Stabat Mater by Rossini at Sydney Opera House Australia, May 2007
- 'Alfredo' in La traviata at Roma Opera Theatre April 2007, at Théâtre Antique d'Orange, Les Chorégies d'Orange, 11 & 15 July 2009, at La Fenice September 2009, Deutsche Oper Berlin September 2009/March 2010
- 'Cassio' in Otello at the Liceu, Barcelona February 2006.
- 'Il Duca de Mantova' in Rigoletto at Hamburg State Opera, September/October 2005.
- 'Don Carlos' in Don Carlos at Geneva Opera House, June 2008.
- 'Edgardo' in Lucia di Lammermoor at Zurich Opera House, September 2008.
- Rigoletto, live from Mantua, 2010 RAI film version of Rigoletto, performed live on location in Mantua, Italy and broadcast simultaneously in 148 countries.
- 'Rodolfo' in La bohème at the Metropolitan Opera, New York, October 2010. It was his debut with the company.
- 'Corrado' in Il corsaro at Zurich Opera House, November 2009/January 2010.
- 'Hoffmann' in Les contes d'Hoffmann at Zurich Opera House, March/April 2010.
- 'Duke of Mantua in Rigoletto at the Metropolitan Opera, New York, 2013
- 'Rodolfo' in La bohème at the Metropolitan Opera, New York, 2014
- 'Hoffmann' in Les contes d'Hoffmann at the Metropolitan Opera, New York, January/February 2015
- 'Romeo' in Romeo et Juliette at the Metropolitan Opera, New York, 2017
- 'Nemorino' in L'Elisir d'Amore at the Royal Opera House, Covent Garden, 2017

== Other activities ==
In 2021, Grigòlo co-founded the Swiss art–technology company Valuart, based in Lugano Paradiso, together with entrepreneur Etan Genini and Michele Fiscalini. The firm gained international attention for its NFT reinterpretation of Banksy’s Spike, a work owned by Grigòlo, which was sold at auction for over US$150,000.
