= Kids Return (band) =

French indie pop band

- Origin: Paris, France
- Genres: Indie pop; psychedelic pop
- Years active: 2021–present
- Labels: Forever Melodies; Ekleroshock Records; Hamburger Records
- Members: Clément Savoye; Adrien Rozé

Kids Return are a French indie pop band formed in 2021. Based in Paris, the duo consists of Clément Savoye and Adrien Rozé.

== History ==
Savoye and Rozé formed the band Kids Return in 2021. In 2022, Kids Return released their first studio album, entitled Forever Melodies. Forever Melodies was ranked in 21st position in the ranking of the 100 best albums of 2022 by Les Inrockuptibles magazine. The band were one of the seven performers awarded a Music Moves Europe Award in 2023. The Quotidien show awarded them the prize for best group of the year during the 2023 Q d'or ceremony.

== Discography ==
=== Studio albums ===
- 2022 : Forever Melodies
- 2025 : 1997

=== Singles ===
- 2021 : Melody
- 2021 : Orange Mountains
- 2022 : Forever
- 2022 : I Will Wait For You
- 2022 : Lost In Los Angeles

== Awards and nominations ==
Award	Year	Category	Nominee(s)	Result	Ref.
Music Moves Europe Award	2023	MME Awards	Themselves	Won	
Q d'or 2023	2023	Best Group	Themselves	Won	
