= Mavi Phoenix =

Austrian musician

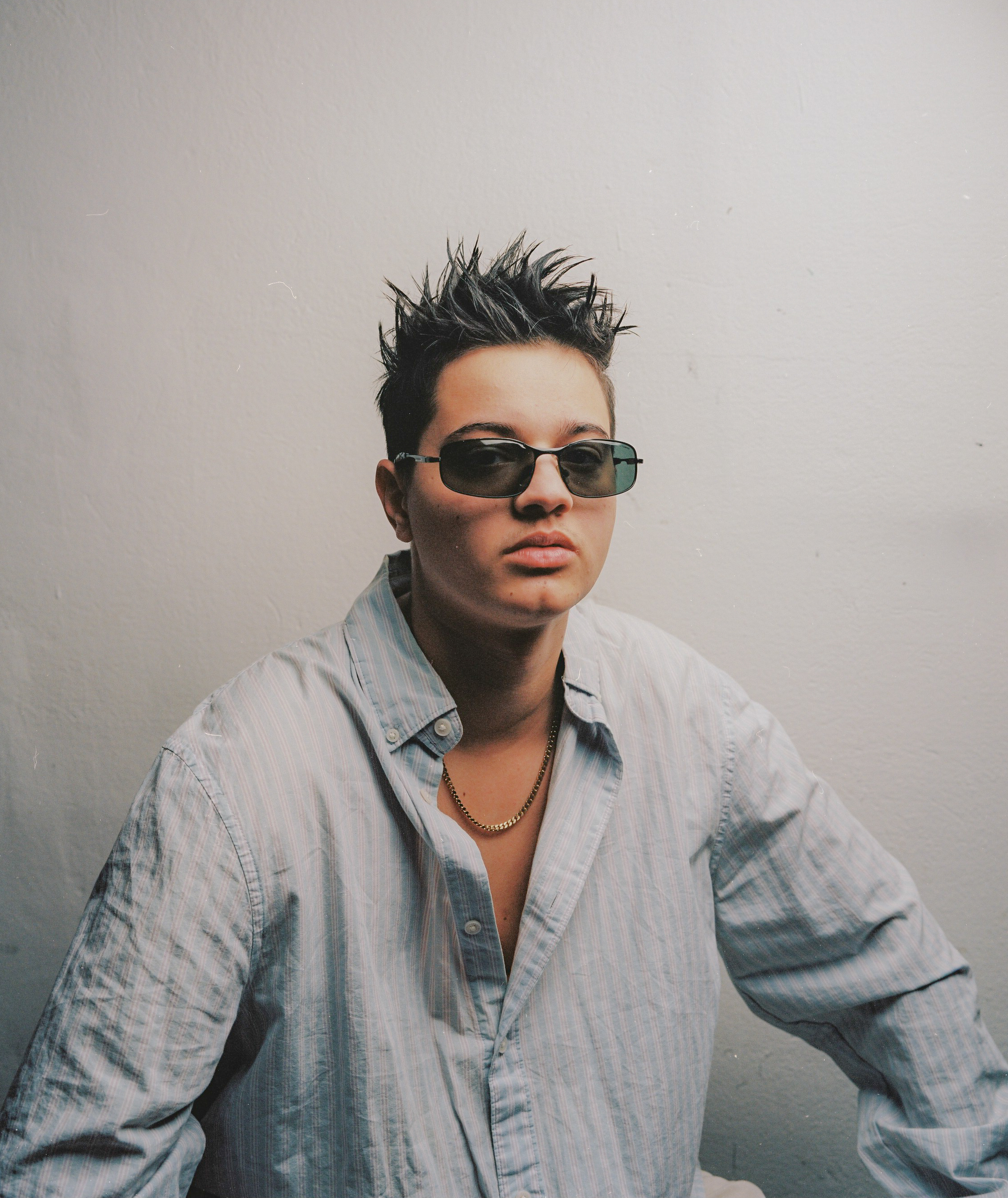

Background information
- Born: Marlene Nader; Linz, Austria
- Occupations: Songer, songwriter, producer
- Years active: 2017–present

Marlon Nader (born Marlene Nader), known professionally as Mavi Phoenix, is an Austrian singer, songwriter, and music producer.

== Biography ==
Phoenix was born in Linz, Austria. He grew up listening to Cyndi Lauper and Madonna from his mother’s record collection, and was exposed to David Bowie, Queens of The Stone Age, NERD and Justice while visiting his father in Vienna.

Phoenix first started making music after his father gifted him a secondhand laptop for his eleventh birthday. He used GarageBand to create beats inspired by Eminem and Foo Fighters. A few years later, he began sharing his music online, first posting on Myspace and eventually moving to YouTube.

Growing up, Phoenix, who was born a woman, wanted to be a man. However, he had little to no information about transsexuality, and decided to suppress his feelings.

Phoenix released his self-produced EP My Fault in 2014 when he was 17, after which he embarked on tour with the Austrian rock band Bilderbuch. In 2016, his dingle “Quiet” reached number one on the FM4 charts.

In early 2020, Phoenix toured Europe with the Kassel band Milky Chance. The same year, he released his debut album Boy Toys that “was characterized by trap, cloud rap and poppy hip-hop beats.” According to Steffen Greiner from Die Zeit: “With Boys Toys, [Phoenix] seemed to have not only found himself, but also a sound that made him the bearer of hope of the often monotonous genre.” The album reached number eighteen on the Austrian charts and earned him a second Amadeus Austrian Music Award. Shortly after, Phoenix came out as transgender, and changed his name from Marlene to Marlon, which was also the namesake for his next LP released on 25 February 2022.

In 2025, Phoenix released his fourth studio album Drama Cowboy, an entirely self-written two-part act that blends “edgy pop, country, drum and bass.” The album was produced by Maximilian Walch and explores “themes of gender, identity and emotion.” Felix Eisenreich from Kulturnews called it “richly produced in texture and theatrically staged.”
