= Hal (album) =

Studio album by Hal
- Released: 2005
- Recorded: 2004
- Studio: Bow Lane Studios (Dublin); West Heath Studios (London)
- Genre: Alternative, indie
- Length: 43:22
- Label: Rough Trade Records
- Producer: Ian Stanley and Edwyn Collins

Professional ratings
Review scores
Source	Rating
AllMusic	4/5 stars
Entertainment.ie	4/5 stars
Gigwise.com	3/5 stars
Uncut	4/5 stars

Hal is the debut of Irish band Hal, released by Rough Trade Records on May 10, 2005.

== Track listing ==
1. "What a Lovely Dance" (Allen, Mullan, O'Brien)
2. "Play the Hits" (Allen, O'Brien)
3. "Keep Love as Your Golden Rule" (Allen, Mullan, O'Brien)
4. "Don't Come Running" (Allen, Mullan, O'Brien)
5. "I Sat Down" (Allen, O'Brien)
6. "My Eyes Are Sore" (Allen, Mullan, O'Brien)
7. "Fools by Your Side" (Allen, Mullan, O'Brien)
8. "Worry About the Wind" (Allen, O'Brien)
9. "Satisfied" (Allen, O'Brien)
10. "Slowdown (You've Got a Friend)" (Allen, O'Brien)
11. "Coming Right Over" (Allen, O'Brien)

== Personnel ==
Hal

- David Allen — guitars, lead vocals
- Paul Allen — bass, backing vocals
- Stephen O'Brien — keyboards

Additional musicians

- Áine O'Brien – whistle
- Mike Thompson — horns
- Richard Watkins — horns
- Paul Archibald – trumpet
- Steven McDonnell – trumpet
- Richard Edwards – trombone
- Karl Ronan — trombone
- Gavin Roche – bass trombone
- Owen Slade – tuba
- Ian Humphries – violin
- Nicolette Kuo – violin
- Jim Sleigh – viola
- Philip Sheppard – cello
- Zoe Martlew – cello
- David Ayre – double bass
- Johnny Scott — pedal steel guitar, mandolin
- Clive Deamer – drums, percussion
- Philip Sheppard — string and brass arrangements
