= High Ceilings & Collarbones =

Studio album by Juan Zelada
- Released: 3 February 2012
- Recorded: 2010–2011
- Genre: Pop
- Length: 54:07
- Label: Decca Records

Singles from High Ceilings & Collarbones
- 1. "Breakfast in Spitalfields" Released: 4 July 2011; 2. "The Blues Remain" Released: 31 October 2011

High Ceilings & Collarbones is the debut studio album by Spanish singer, songwriter and musician Juan Zelada. It was first released on 2 December 2011 in the United Kingdom. The album peaked to number 53 on the UK Albums Chart.

== Track listing ==
Standard listing
No.	Title	Length
1.	"The Blues Remain"	4:09
2.	"Breakfast in Spitalfields"	3:50
3.	"Baby Be Mine"	4:42
4.	"Elsewhere"	4:08
5.	"What Do I know"	4:04
6.	"Barman"	4:31
7.	"The Boy With the Television On"	5:35
8.	"Open Up My Eyes"	4:02
9.	"Satisfied"	4:34
10.	"Four Days"	3:23
11.	"I Can't Love"	6:50
12.	"Don't You Hold Me Down"	4:19

== Chart performance ==
Chart (2012)	Peak position
UK Albums Chart	53

== Release history ==
Country	Date	Format	Label
United Kingdom	3 February 2012	Digital download	Decca Records
United Kingdom	6 February 2012	CD	Decca Records
