= 2 (Saint Lu album) =

Studio album by Saint Lu
- Released: 15 February 2013
- Genre: Soul, Pop, Soft rock
- Label: Warner Music
- Producer: Patrik Majer

Saint Lu chronology
Saint Lu (2009)	2 (2013)

2 is the second full-length album by the Austrian singer-songwriter Luise Gruber, better known as Saint Lu. The album is noteworthy for its music direction change, from the blues and rock of its predecessor toward a more soul-oriented aesthetic with elements of funk, jazz and baroque pop. The album was released on 15 February 2013 via Warner Music. The album was intended to accompany Saint Lu's representation of Germany at the Eurovision Song Contest in Malmö but the selection jury in Hannover selected Cascada instead.

== Track listing ==
2 – Standard edition
No.	Title	Writer(s)	Length
1.	"Waterfall"	Shelly Peiken, Luise Gruber, Xandy Berry	3:12
2.	"Craving"	Gruber, Stefan Skarbek	3:52
3.	"Falling for Your Love"	Jimmy Messer, Roxanne Seeman, Gruber	2:43
4.	"I Got a Feeling"	Gruber, Tim Baxter	3:37
5.	"No One Loves You Like I do"	Charlie Midnight, Gruber	4:39
6.	"Revive This Flower"	Gruber, Baxter	3:56
7.	"The Letter"	Gruber	2:58
8.	"Postcard from Hell"	Midnight, Messer, Gruber	3:05
9.	"Mrs. Suffer"	Midnight, Gruber	3:28
10.	"Why Do I Want Love"	James Bryan, Nicholas Whitecross, Gruber	3:51
11.	"Lady of the Lanterns"	Gruber, Baxter	3:57
Total length:			39:23

2 – iTunes edition (bonus track)
No.	Title	Writer(s)	Length
12.	"Craving (Saint Lu Bathroom Remix)"	Gruber, Skarbek	3:45

An acoustic EP, named "2 (Acoustic EP)" was released shortly after the release of the album. It contains new, acoustic arrangements of six of the songs from the album

2 (Acoustic EP)
No.	Title	Writer(s)	Length
1.	"Falling for Your Love (Acoustic Version)"	Messer, Seeman, Gruber	2:52
2.	"Waterfall (Acoustic Version)"	Peiken, Gruber, Berry	3:16
3.	"Postcard From Hell (Acoustic Version)"	Midnight, Messer, Gruber	3:15
4.	"I Got a Feeling (Acoustic Version)"	Gruber, Baxter	4:03
5.	"Craving (Acoustic Version)"	Gruber, Skarbek	3:28
6.	"Lady of the Lanterns (Acoustic Version)"	Gruber, Baxter	3:48
Total length:			20:45

== Personnel ==
- Patrik Majer – producer, engineer, percussion
- Sven Teichmann – engineer
- Steve Price – engineer
- Saint Lu – co-producer, glockenspiel
- Ben Hamilton – acoustic guitar
- Alex Grube – bass
- Philipp Schwär – co-producer
- Jan Burkamp – drums
- James Bryan – electric guitar
- Jimmy Messer – electric guitar
- Lars Cölln – electric guitar
- Christian Löhr – keyboards
- Philipp Schwär – keyboards, programming
- Philipp Steinke – keyboards
- Tim Baxter – keyboards
- Sebastian Borowski – saxophone
- Steve Sidwell – strings
- Christoph Titz – trumpet

== Critical reception ==
Oberösterreichische Nachrichten, Austria, describes the album as "abounding with emotions and ideas. Soul Pop and Blues combine with the dark, versatile grater-like voice of the 30-year old into a fascinating fusion".

Tracks Magazin, Switzerland, writes: "2 keeps what the self-titled debut from 2009 brought into view. At that time, she sang confident pop rock. Now it is more confident and more rock pop with a lot of soul in it".

Steve Braun of Rock Times writes: "2 offers magical moments that reveal Luise Gruber's huge potential. 'Falling For Your Love' must be mentioned first".

== Charts ==
Chart (2013)	Peak position
Germany (German Albums Chart)	42
Austria (O3 Austria Top 40)	27
Switzerland (Schweizer Hitparade)	36
