= In the Hands of Love =

Studio album by Vittorio Grigolo
- Released: 13 March 2006
- Recorded: 2005
- Genres: Classical; operatic pop
- Label: Polydor
- Producer: Romano Musumarra

Vittorio Grigolo chronology
In the Hands of Love (2006)	West Side Story (2007)

Singles from In the Hands of Love
- 1. "You Are My Miracle" Released: 2006

In the Hands of Love (released in the US under the title Vittorio) is the debut studio album by Italian operatic tenor Vittorio Grigolo, released in 2006 by Polydor Records.

== Background ==
The first single from the album, "You Are My Miracle" featuring Nicole Scherzinger, was released in 2006 as a debut single to American audiences, while another version of the song features singer Katherine Jenkins.

== Track listing ==
In the Hands of Love track listing
No.	Title	Writer(s)	Length
1.	"Tu sei"	Romano Musumarra, Giorgio Flavio Pintus	3:25
2.	"Il mio miracolo"	Musumarra, Pintus	4:15
3.	"Bedshaped (Cosi)"	Tom Chaplin, Richard Hughes, Tim Rice-Oxley, Musumarra (adaptation)	4:12
4.	"Magia de amor"	Liliana Gimenez, Musumarra	4:04
5.	"In the Hands of Love"	Musumarra, Carol Welsman	3:52
6.	"All in Love Is Fair (Se l'amore c'è)"	Stevie Wonder, Musumarra (adaptation)	3:43
7.	"Fuerte"	Luis Gómez-Escolar, Musumarra	4:04
8.	"If You're Not the One (Se tu non sei lei)"	Daniel Bedingfield, Musumarra (adaptation)	4:25
9.	"Querida"	Judith Bérard, Gimenez, Musumarra	4:47
10.	"Listen to the Bell (Chi ci ascolterà)"	Musumarra, Pintus	4:00
11.	"Roma sogna"	Musumarra, Pintus	4:06
12.	"Butterfly Forever"	Valerio Calisse, Musumarra, Pintus	3:39
13.	"You Are My Miracle" (duet with Katherine Jenkins)	Musumarra, Pintus, Welsman	4:15
14.	"Maria"	Leonard Bernstein, Stephen Sondheim	2:56
15.	"E lucevan le stelle"	Giuseppe Giacosa, Luigi Illica, Giacomo Puccini	3:02

== Charts ==
=== Weekly charts ===
Chart performance for In the Hands of Love
Chart (2006)	Peak position
Australian Albums (ARIA)	24
Dutch Albums (Album Top 100)	36
UK Albums (OCC)	6
US Billboard 200	195
US Top Classical Albums (Billboard)	2

=== Year-end charts ===
Year-end chart performance for In the Hands of Love
Chart (2006)	Position
UK Albums (OCC)	143

== Certifications ==
Region	Certification	Certified units/sales
Australia (ARIA)	Gold	35,000^{^}
^{^} Shipments figures based on certification alone.
