= Rastenfeld =

- Municipality
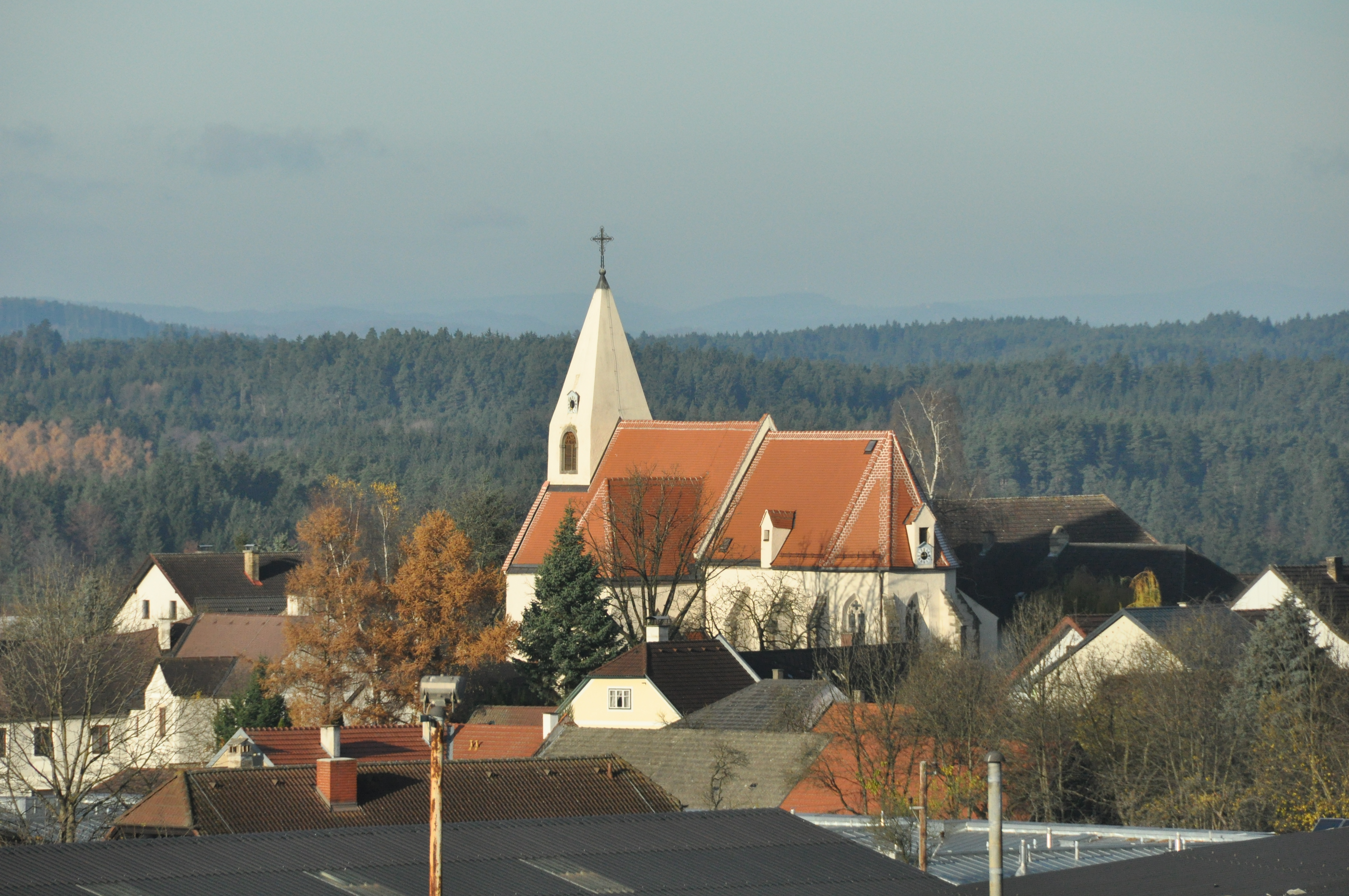
- Rastenfeld parish church

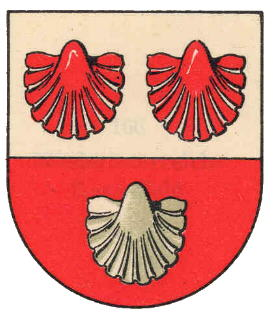
- Coat of arms

- Location within Austria
- Coordinates: 48°34′N 15°19′E
- Country: Austria
- State: Lower Austria
- District: Krems-Land

Government
  - Mayor: Gerhard Wandl

Area
  - Total: 47.62 km^{2} (18.39 sq mi)
- Elevation: 579 m (1,900 ft)

Population (2018-01-01)
  - Total: 1,551
  - Density: 32.57/km^{2} (84.36/sq mi)
- Time zone: UTC+1 (CET)
  - Summer (DST): UTC+2 (CEST)
- Postal code: 3532
- Area code: 02826
- Website: www.rastenfeld.at

Rastenfeld is a town in the district of Krems-Land in the Austrian state of Lower Austria.

== Population ==
Historical population
Year	Pop.	±%
1971	1,517	—
1981	1,383	−8.8%
1991	1,334	−3.5%
2001	1,367	+2.5%
2011	1,412	+3.3%
2021	1,601	+13.4%
