= Good Man Down =

2011 album by Ewert and The Two Dragons

Studio album by Ewert and The Two Dragons
- Released: April 5, 2011; June 25, 2013 (US re-release)
- Recorded: 2011
- Studio: Türi Center for the Performing Arts (Türi, Estonia); Sonicmedia Studios (Tallinn, Estonia)
- Genre: Indie folk
- Length: 48:36
- Label: I Love You Records (LV); Sire Records (US)

Ewert and The Two Dragons chronology
The Hills Behind the Hills (2009)	Good Man Down (2011)

Singles from Ewert and The Two Dragons
- 1. "(In the End) There's Only Love" Released: January 19, 2011; 2. "Jolene" Released: April 6, 2011; 3. "Good Man Down" Released: November 8, 2011

Good Man Down is the second album by Estonian indie rock band Ewert and The Two Dragons. It was released on April 15, 2011, as the follow-up to their debut album The Hills Behind The Hills. Upon release, the album was met with positive response from critics and was nominated for four awards for Estonian Music Awards, of which it won all. The album was the best-selling album of 2011 and 2012 in Estonia. On June 25, 2013, the album was re-released in the US by Sire Records and Warner Bros. Records.

== Summary ==
The band started recording the album as a follow-up to their 2009 album The Hills Behind The Hills. The songs were written and developed during the band's stay at a cottage in Kloogaranna which belonged to Ewert Sundja's father-in-law. The tracks "(In The End) There's Only Love" and "You Had Me At Hello" were recorded during the band's stay at Kloogaranna. The recording of the rest of the album took place in Türi Centre for Performing Arts at the end of 2010 and beginning of 2011. Additional recording and mastering of the album took place at Sonicmedia Studios by Siim Mäesalu.

On April 15, the album was released in Estonia and Latvia on the Latvian indie label I Love You Records. A year after that, the album was released in Belgium and the Netherlands on Talitres Records. On November 9, the album came out in Sweden under the label Adore Music.

The first single from the album, "(In The End) There's Only Love" was released in January 2011 for radio airplay in Estonia and Latvia. It was immediately picked up by Estonian and Latvian radio stations and was well received by listeners and critics. The music video for the song was released on January 19. The second single from the album, "Good Man Down" was released in November. On November 8, a music video for the single was released, directed by Andzei Matsukevits and Kaimar Kukk and produced by Contrast Eye and Caviar Productions.

== Track listing ==
All lyrics are written by Ewert Sundja or Erki Pärnoja except where noted

No.	Title	Length
1.	"(In The End) There's Only Love"	4:10
2.	"Good Man Down"	4:32
3.	"Jolene"	4:01
4.	"Panda"	7:02
5.	"Burning Bush"	2:52
6.	"Sailor Man" (Erki Pärnoja, Helen Sürje)	4:32
7.	"The Rabbit"	5:15
8.	"Road To The Hill"	4:10
9.	"Falling" (Ewert Sundja, Albert af Ekenstam)	4:56
10.	"You Had Me At Hello"	7:10

US re-release bonus track
No.	Title	Length
14.	"I Can See Yer House From Here"	3:04

== Awards and nominations ==
=== Estonian Music Awards ===
Year	Nominee / work	Award	Result
2011	"Good Man Down"	Album of The Year	Won
2011	"Good Man Down"	Best Rock Album	Won
2011	Good Man Down	Song of The Year	Won

=== Radio 2 Hit of The Year ===
Year	Nominee / work	Award	Result
2011	"Good Man Down"	Hit of The Year	Won

=== European Border Breakers Award ===
Year	Nominee / work	Award	Result
2012	Good Man Down	EBBA	Won

== Personnel ==
Ewert and The Two Dragons

- Ewert Sundja
- Erki Pärnoja
- Kristjan Kallas
- Ivo Etti

Additional personnel

- Siim Mäesalu - mastering, engineering
- Bruno Roze - artwork
- Johanna Eenma - photography
- Rasmus Jurkatam - photography
