= Saint Lu (album) =

Studio album by Saint Lu
- Released: 2009
- Genre: Rock, Blues
- Length: 51:22
- Label: Warner Music Group

Saint Lu chronology
One Step Closer (2005)	Saint Lu (2009)	2 (2013)

Saint Lu is the debut album by the Austrian singer-songwriter Luise Gruber, better known as Saint Lu. It features collaborations with the guitarist Peter Weihe. The album was critically acclaimed, but failed to chart higher than #30 in Austria.

== Track listing ==
No.	Title	Lyrics	Music	Length
1.	"Don't Miss Your Own Life"	Nina Vigors	Anya Vigos, Peter Weihe	4:00
2.	"Rockstar Car"	Luise Gruber, Anya Vigors	Luise Gruber, Peter Weihe	3:48
3.	"Love Song"	Luise Gruber	Luise Gruber, Peter Weihe, Marc Beierstedt	3:27
4.	"Ankle-Biter"	Luise Gruber, Anya Vigors	Luise Gruber, Peter Weihe	4:19
5.	"Here I Stand"	Anya Vigors	Anya Vigors, Peter Weihe	3:18
6.	"What Is That Love?"	Luise Gruber	Luise Gruber, Peter Weihe	3:56
7.	"All That I Ever Wanted"	Luise Gruber	Luise Gruber, Peter Weihe	3:34
8.	"All In One (Multifunctional Mum)"	Luise Gruber	Luise Gruber, Peter Weihe	3:41
9.	"I Say Yeah, You Say No"	Luise Gruber	Luise Gruber, Peter Weihe, Patrik Majer, W. Gaba	3:23
10.	"Memory"	Anya Vigors	Anya Vigors, Peter Weihe, Patrik Majer	3:41
11.	"Mister Blow"	Luise Gruber	Luise Gruber, Peter Weihe	2:11

iTunes bonus track

No.	Title	Length
12.	"High Time"	3:29

CD edition bonus track

No.	Title	Length
12.	"You Know, You Know"	4:04

iTunes Acoustic EP

No.	Title	Length
1.	"Don't Miss Your Own Life (Acoustic Version)"	4:01
2.	"Memory (Acoustic Version)"	3:38

== Singles ==
- Don't Miss Your Own Life

No.	Title	Length
1.	"Don't Miss Your Own Life (Album Version)"	4:00
2.	"Don't Miss Your Own Life (Acoustic Version)"	4:00
3.	"Don't Miss Your Own Life (Instrumental)"	4:00
4.	"Ankle-Biter (Album Version)"	4:19

- Here I Stand

No.	Title	Length
1.	"Here I Stand (Album Version)"	3:18
2.	"Here I Stand (UK Radio Mix)"	3:03

- Rockstar Car

No.	Title	Length
1.	"Rockstar Car (feat. Henning Wehland von Söhne Mannheims & H-Blockx)"	3:24
2.	"Rockstat Car (Single Version)"	3:24
3.	"Rockstar Car (Unplugged Version)"	3:47

== Charts ==
Chart (2009–2010)	Position
Austrian Albums (Ö3 Austria)	30
German Albums (Offizielle Top 100)	79
Swiss Albums (Schweizer Hitparade)	84
