= Leo Zelada =

Spanish-Peruvian writer

Braulio Rubén Tupaj Amaru Grajeda Fuentes, prominently known by his literary pseudonym Leo Zelada, is a Spanish-Peruvian poet and writer. He was born in Lima, Peru, but has been living in Madrid, Spain for 18 years.

== Biography ==
Zelada studied philosophy at San Marcos University of Peru and he was in charge of a poetical workshop called "Carpe Diem". He used to publish articles and writings in the most important newspapers of Latin America, such as El Peruano.

From 1983 to 1998 he traveled all over Latin America just with his backpack. He passed the Andes, the Amazons, the Darien, the Caribbeans and Chiapas, and finally he arrived at Los Angeles, United States of America. He has traveled throughout America and Europe, having Spain as his country of residence. He coordinates La Tertulia Literaria Exiles in Madrid. Colaborador of the newspaper Madridpress.

In May 2013, Vimeo and YouTube released a documentary short titled "Leo Zelada. Underground Poet", held in Madrid, by the Spanish audiovisual producer, Amagifilms.

Zelada won in February 2015 the Prize Poets of Other Worlds, granted by the International Poetic Fund of Spain.

Much of his work is in the National Library of Spain in Madrid.

His book Transpoética was published in Madrid in 2016 by Vaso Roto Ediciones. In February 2019 his novel El Último Nómada was published in Spain.

In January 2021, the documentary "Leo Zelada: Transpoética" was released on You Tube, a road movie with a musical background of trap, ethnic and electronic music. It has English and French subtitles. The documentary was pre-premiered in Madrid, on January 5, 2021.

In March 2022, an anthology of all his poetic work titled "Transpoetique" was released in Paris, France, under the Unicite Editions label. He has performed several poetry recitals in Paris, the last one on June 22, 2022, at the prestigious Maison de l'Amérique latine in Paris.

In the second half of 2024, his second book in French entitled “La Traversée de l'innommable” was published in Paris by Unicite Editions. https://www.editions-unicite.fr/auteurs/ZELADA-Leo/la-traversee-de-l-innommable/index.php, poems from this book were published in the prestigious magazine of culture and contemporary art “Souffle Inédit”. https://souffleinedit.com/poesie-art-litteraire/leo-zelada/

La Traversée de l'innommable came out for La Marche de la Poésie, an event where the author signed copies of his new book. The book was presented privately on a boat in Boulogne-Billancourt and publicly on October 25 at La Maison de America Latina, in Saint-Germain, Paris. https://www.mal217.org/fr/la-traversee-de-l-innommable-7e07d674

== Works ==
=== Poetry ===
- Delirium Tremens (Lima, Perú, 1998).
- Journal of a Cyber-Punk D.F. (Mexico, 2001).
- Nosferatu's booklet about to dawn (Lima, Perú 2005).
- The Way of the Dragon (Madrid, España, 2008).
- Minimal Poética (Madrid, España, Vaso Roto Ediciones, 2010).
- Transpoética (Madrid, España, Vaso Roto Ediciones, 2016).
- Transpoetique, Poetic Anthology(Unicite Editions, France, 2022)
- “La Traversée de l'innommable” was published in Paris by Unicite Editions(France 2024).

=== Novels ===
- American Death of Life (Lima, 2005).
- El Último Nómada (Madrid, España, Ruleta Rusa Ediciones, 2019).

=== Translations ===
- Poetic Anthology of the Inca Empire (Madrid, España, 2007).

=== Anthologies ===
- Literary Anthology of the Baquiana Magazine (La Florida, United States, Baquiana Editions, 2001).
- Maratón de Escritores (Madrid, España, Ediciones Netwriter, 2011)
- Anthology Yearbook of Baquiana (Florida, United States, Editions Baquiana, 2002).
- Bukowski Club 2006-08. Jam session of poetry (Madrid, Spain, Editions Escalera, 2008).
- Marathon of Writers (Madrid, Spain, Ediciones Netwriter, 2011).
- Bukowski Club. Anthology Poetics (Madrid, Spain, Canalla Ediciones, 2011).

=== Compiler ===
- Contemporary Peruvian poetry: Neon: Poems without limits of speed: poetic anthology, 1990–2003 (Lima, Perú, 2003).
- Beyond the Boom: New Ibero-American Narrative (Madrid, España, 2007).
- New Poetry and Hispanic American Narrative (Madrid, España, 2011).
- Current Hispanoamerican Poetry (Madrid, España, 2017).
