= Hal (Irish band) =

Irish rock band

HAL
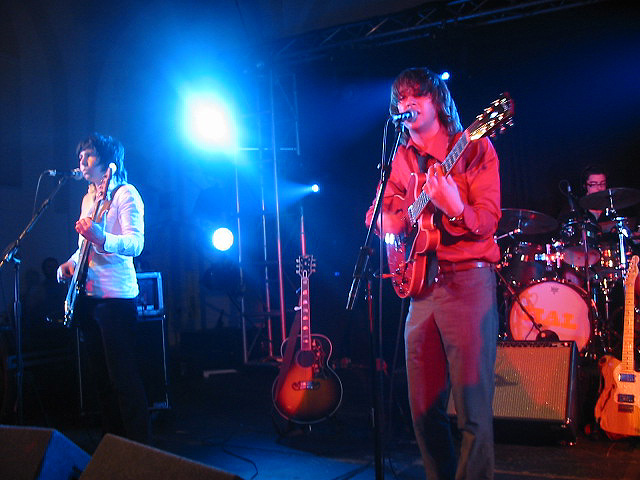
- Hal performing in 2005.

Background information
- Origin: Dublin, Ireland
- Genres: Indie rock, alternative rock, pop rock
- Years active: 2003–present
- Label: Rough Trade
- Members: Dave Allen; Paul Allen; Paul Hogan; Stephen O'Brien
- Website: http://www.halrecords.com/

HAL are a band from Dublin, Ireland, composed of brothers Dave Allen (vocals/guitar) and Paul Allen (vocals/bass), Paul Hogan (drums) and Stephen O'Brien (keyboards, occasional guitars and backing vocals), who formed in 2003.

== Biography ==
Hal were signed to Rough Trade Records in 2004 following competition between several record labels.

Their first single, "Worry About the Wind" was released in 2004. Their self-titled debut album followed and "Don't Come Running" / "I Sat Down" were released as a double A-side single. The band also released "Keep Love As Your Golden Rule" on a split 7-inch single with (The Magic Numbers)

They also contributed their cover of John Lennon's "Mind Games" to a Q magazine CD in October 2005.

The band toured worldwide in 2004 and 2005 supporting shows for Doves and Grandaddy. the band went back into the recording studio at the end of 2005.

In August 2010, the band announced that they were working on their next album on their website and Facebook page. In February 2012 the band released the 4 track 'Down In The Valley' EP digitally. Their second album 'The Time The Hour' was released in April 2012.

== Awards ==
- The Irish Post Best Newcomer Award 2005
- European Border Breakers Award 2006, awarded by the European Commission in Cannes in January 2006
- Best Irish Album of 2005 in the Irish Independent
- Nr.1 album van 2005 in French music magazine MAGIC
- One of the albums of 2005 in Mojo and Uncut

== Nominations ==
- Choice Award 2005 in Ireland. Hal played live at the award show in Dublin
- Best Irish Band of 2005 at the Irish Music Awards

== Discography ==
=== Albums ===
- Hal (2005) – UK No. 31
- The Time, the Hour (2012)

=== EPs ===
- Down in the Valley (2012)

=== Singles ===
- "Worry About the Wind" (26 April 2004) – IRE No. 43, UK No. 53
- "What a Lovely Dance" (24 January 2005) – IRE No. 19, UK No. 36
- "Play the Hits" (11 April 2005) – UK No. 38
- "Don't Come Running" / "I Sat Down" (15 August 2005)
