= Juan Zelada =

Spanish singer songwriter

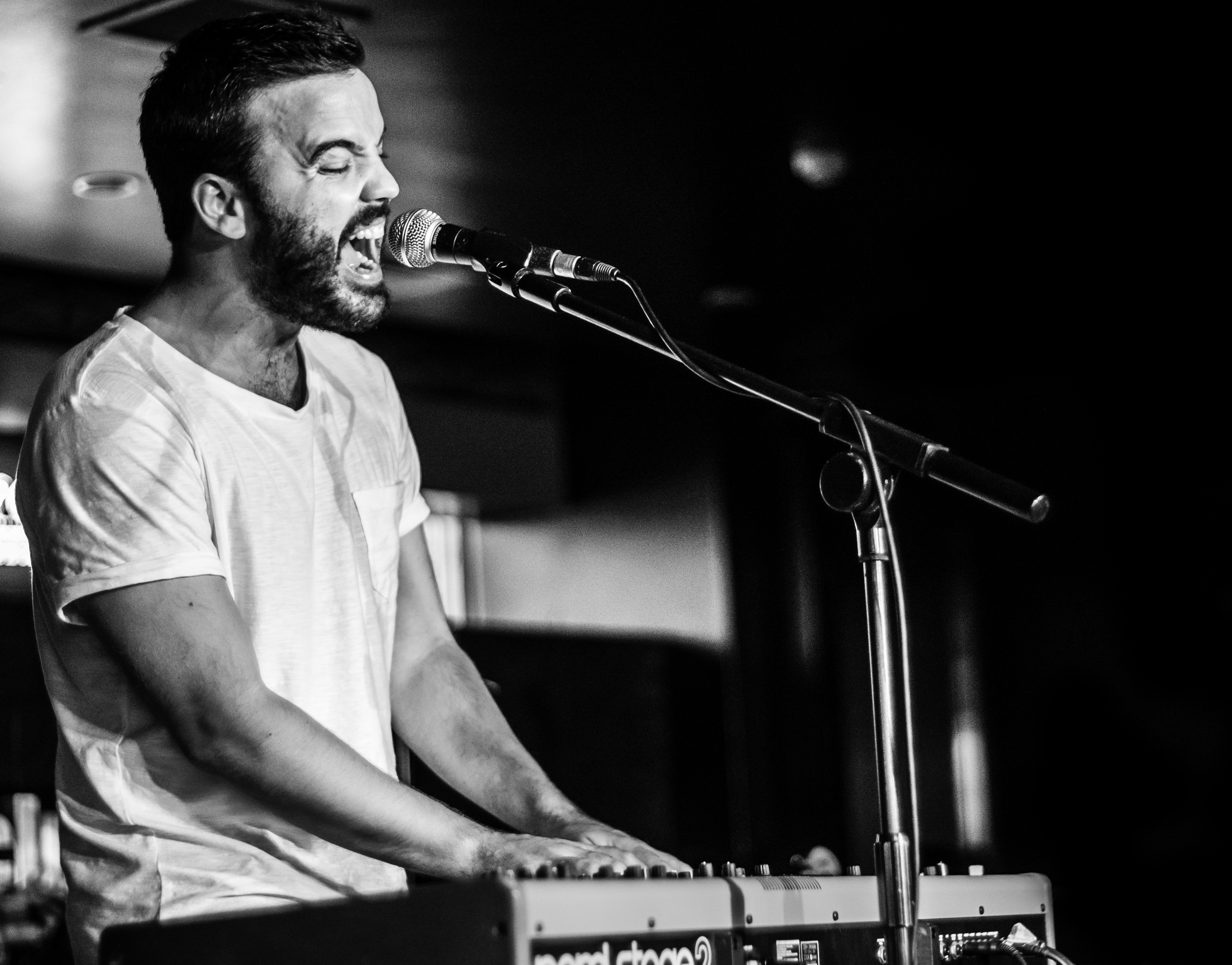
- Juan Zelada (Back on track Tour)

Background information
- Born: Juan Zelada; 26 April 1981 (age 45); Madrid, Spain
- Genres: Pop, soul, blues, folk
- Occupations: Singer, songwriter, musician
- Years active: 2006–present
- Website: www.jzelada.com

Juan Zelada (born 26 April 1981) is a Spanish singer, songwriter and musician.

Zelada was raised in a musical family environment, consisting of jam sessions throughout the different generations. In 2006 he completed his studies at the Liverpool Institute for Performing Arts.

Having moved to London, he set up a band, whilst still playing in restaurants, pubs, hotels and cruise ships. He began to gig around the London scene to great acclaim including supporting Amy Winehouse on her Back to Black tour.

In 2012, he released the single "Breakfast in Spitalfields" which became a national success, being the most aired single on BBC Radio 2 only second to Adele.

He continues to tour with his band, supporting artists such as Ben Howard, The Noisettes, Gavin Degraw or Michael Kiwanuka, as well as his own headline tours, including a festival tour with over 30 festivals in the summer of 2012.

His album High Ceilings and Collar Bones was released in 2012 by Decca Records, receiving compliments from BBC London News as “one to watch”. The second single, "The Blues Remain", became single of the week for iTunes and was also included in the BBC's A Playlist.

In 2013, he released the EP Follow the River after a successful crowdfunding campaign with PledgeMusic also receiving a European Border Breakers Award at the Eurosonic Festival in Groningen, and an invitation from Jools Holland to attend his BBC show.

He returned to Spain, after an inspirational trip backpacking around South America in 2014 writing a lot of the material which would be included in his new album, as well as a blog called Away with Music, interacting with other local musicians.

On his return he worked alongside producer Carlos Jean in Spain to release Back on Track in early 2015 under Spanish label MUWOM. Without retaining his soul style, the album incorporated other musical styles such as electronica.

The first single, "Dreaming Away" was aired on major national stations, and was included in a national TV advertising campaign with Nationale-Nederlanden.

With Back on Track, Zelada toured extensively with his new band around Spain.

== Discography ==
=== Albums ===
Title	Year	Peak chart positions	
Title	Year	UK	ES
High Ceilings & Collarbones	Released: February 3, 2012; Label: Decca Records; Formats: CD, digital download	53	59
Back on Track	Released: January 20, 2015; Label: MUWOM; Formats: digital download	-	100

=== EPs ===
- The Story of Stuff - 2010
- Follow the River - 2013

=== Singles ===
Year	Title	Album
2011	"Breakfast in Spitalfields"	High Ceilings & Collarbones
2011	"The Blues Remain"	High Ceilings & Collarbones
2012	"What Do I Know"	High Ceilings & Collarbones
2015	"Dreaming Away"	
2015	"Dreaming Away"	Back on Track
