= Paint Your Face =

Studio album by Sliimy
- Released: April 6, 2009
- Recorded: 2009
- Genre: Pop
- Label: Warner Music Group
- Producer: Feed

Singles from Paint Your Face
- 1. "Wake Up"; 2. "Trust Me"; 3. "Paint Your Face"; 4. "Our Generation/See U Again"

Paint Your Face is the debut studio album by French recording artist Sliimy. It was released on April 6, 2009, by Warner Music Group.

== Track listing ==
Info per BBC.

No.	Title	Length
1.	"Wake Up"
2.	"Magic Game"
3.	"Our Generation"
4.	"Everytime"
5.	"Paint Your Face"
6.	"Baby"
7.	"Trust Me"
8.	"Mum"
9.	"Waiting For"
10.	"Tic Tac"
11.	"My God"
12.	"See U Again"
13.	"Womanizer"
