= Janis Sahraoui =

- Also known as: Sliimy (until 2015); Yanis (2015-2023)
- Born: 16 September 1988 (age 37); Saint-Étienne, France.
- Genres: Pop, Rock, Soul
- Occupations: Singer-songwriter, performance artist, dancer
- Instruments: Vocals, Piano
- Years active: 2009–present
- Label: Warner Music Group

Janis Sahraoui (French: [saʁawi]; born 16 September 1988) is a French pop musician and singer-songwriter.

Sahraoui debuted in the late 2000s under the stage name Sliimy (rhyming with "Jimmy") through social networking websites where she released her songs. The artist soon received attention online and signed into recording label Warner Music Group, releasing the single Wake Up and her debut album Paint Your Face in 2009, which reached number 2 in the French charts. The singer then performed on stage, in concerts and in opening acts for Britney Spears and Katy Perry.

Singing mostly in English in an accent that has been described as "mockney", with androgynous looks and a falsetto voice, the artist was compared to Mika or Prince by the press. Sahraoui was sometimes also dubbed "the French Mika" in her native France and internationally.

Sahraoui performed as "Yanis" from 2015 to 2023 and released the EP L'heure Bleue in 2016.

== Life and career ==
=== Early life ===
Sahraoui was born on 16 September 1988 in Saint-Étienne, Loire. Assigned male at birth, Sahraoui used her birth name Yanis until 2023. Of Moroccan and Algerian descent, Sahraoui grew up in the neighborhood of Vivaraize, along with her three sisters and brother. She studied at high school before going to the university of Notre-Dame Valbernoîte.

In 2005, Sahraoui won a singing contest at Pax in Saint-Etienne, and won a record in a studio where she met Feed, who became her partner and guitarist.

=== Debut as Sliimy (2007-2010) ===
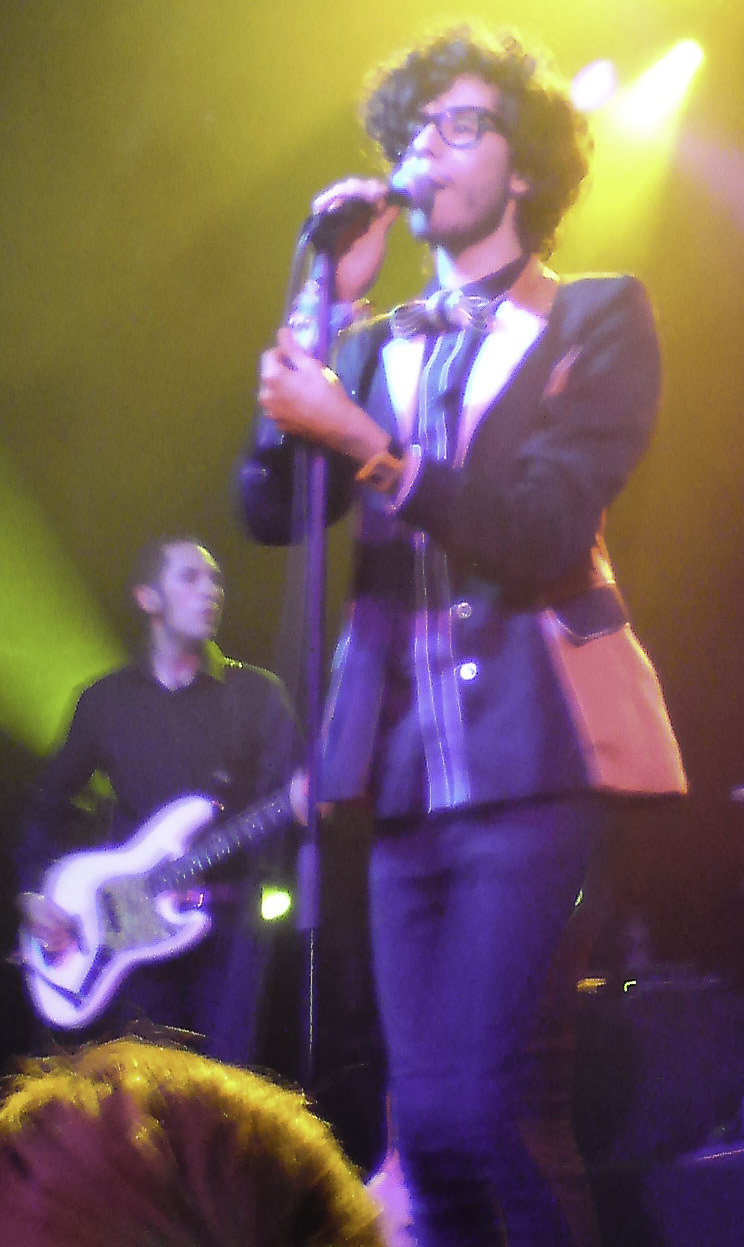
Saharoui, when Sliimy, performing on stage in 2009

In her late teens, Sahraoui began using the online alias "Sliimy": from the English word "slim", referring the artist's slender frame and a double I, which according to Sahraoui, visually represent two thin legs. As Sliimy, Sahraoui used social networking websites such as Myspace where she uploaded recordings of her songs. The artist was met with success online, and with her guitarist Feed she eventually signed into recording label Warner Music Group. Sahraoui received more international attention in late 2008 after her cover of Britney Spears's song Womanizer was featured by American blogger Perez Hilton.

Her debut album Paint Your Face was recorded at the artist's home studio in Saint-Étienne in January 2009. In February 2009, Sahraoui was part of the coming-nexts du Grand Journal on Canal+. Her first single was titled Wake Up and made available on legal music download platforms. Paint Your Face was mixed at Trout Recording Studio in New York in March by Bryce Goggin, who has worked with Antony and the Johnsons and Pavement. It was released on 6 April 2009 by Warner.

As Sliimy, the artist opened for Britney Spears's Circus Tour in Paris-Bercy in France in July 2009. She also went on tour with singer Katy Perry for the Hello Katy Tour in Switzerland and England in 2009. A few months later, the artist made a surprising appearance in the music video for the hit song I Gotta Feeling by The Black Eyed Peas in the album The END.

Four singles were taken from the album Paint Your Face between 2009 and 2010: Wake Up, Trust Me, the song Paint Your Face, and the double-single Our Generation/I See U Again.

In January 2010, Sahraoui was nominated for the European Border Breakers Awards 2010 to represent France with Paint Your Face. The artist lost to Milow.

=== L'heure Bleue (2011-2016) ===
After her debut album, in the year 2011 Sahraoui announced that she will start to prepare and write the lyrics for her second studio album and that she easily chose to take time to refine her new album. In fact, the singer also claims to have written French records, unlike the first album and their primary ideas. On 9 September 2011, Sahraoui gave an interview for the international fashion magazine Vs., in which she talks about her future projects and mainly expresses her desire to record a new album that will be "very different" than Paint Your Face, and show a clear evolution in their career. At the same time, a new demo leaked on the internet, the song Spellbound Kisses. A few months later in December 2011, other demos continued to be released, titled Polaroid and The Sky.

In March 2012, Sahraoui revealed a re-adaptation of the song Skinny Genes by Eliza Doolittle in French. In September 2012, demos similar to the first two were released, titled Fight For Your Eyes and Light. In 2012 and 2013, the singer was regularly in the in-house studios of Warner Music in France.

In January 2013, Sahraoui said she still has not decided on a release date, although the record could be out in 2014, and the themes and inspirations that will be addressed in this album will be the dream world and surrealism.

In spring 2015, Sahraoui made a comeback as "Yanis" with a new single Hypnotized. The song was illustrated with a music video directed by Ludovic Zuili and starring Charlotte Le Bon. Later that year, the song was followed by another single Crave before releasing an EP titled L'heure Bleue (French for 'The Blue Hour') in February 2016.

=== Recent endeavors (2018-present) ===
In 2018, Sahraoui released a new song Embrace accompanied with a music video co-directed with Ludovic Zuili and Sahraoui. This was followed in 2020, when the artist released two songs titled Grace and You Boy.

In 2021, Sahraoui announced she prepared a new EP, and released the single Solo, sung in French.

Since 2023, she has become known as Janis. In May 2024, Sahraoui published her autobiography Révéler mes visages, co-written with journalist Tal Madesta.

== Personal life ==
When she was 20, three days before the release of her debut album, Sahraoui (who presented as male at the time) came out as gay to the media: "I have no problem saying that I’m gay. I know it and I am not afraid to hide it." When questions about this subject recur, Sahraoui responded that she likes to play with different sexualities and ambiguity. In an interview, according to VS. magazine, the artist insisted that music "transcended sexuality."

On 16 September 2021, while preparing the release of her new EP Solo, Sahraoui publicly came out as transgender and non-binary.

== Discography ==
=== Albums ===
- Paint Your Face (2009) (as Sliimy)

=== EPs ===
- L'heure Bleue (2016) (as Yanis)

=== Singles ===
==== As Sliimy ====
- Wake Up (2008)
- Paint Your Face (2009)

==== As Yanis ====
- Hypnotized (2015)
- Crave (2015)
- Embrace (2018)
- Grace (2020)
- You Boy (2020)
- Solo (2021)

== Filmography ==
- Orlando, My Political Biography, directed by Paul B. Preciado (2023) : Orlando

== Books ==
- Sahraoui, Janis; Madesta, Tal (May 2024). Révéler mes visages (in French). HarperCollins. ISBN 979-10-339-1686-4.
