= Valuart =

Swiss art–technology company

- Type: Private
- Industry: Art technology
- Founded: 2021
- Headquarters: Lugano Paradiso, Ticino, Switzerland
- Key people: Etan Genini (CEO); Vittorio Grigòlo (co‑founder); Michele Fiscalini (co‑founder)
- Website: valuart.com

Valuart is a Swiss art–technology company (and gallery owner) based in Lugano Paradiso, Switzerland. The firm gained international attention in 2021 for producing and auctioning an NFT inspired by Banksy’s artwork Spike, and in 2022 for co‑producing MetaVanity, a metaverse museum project presented by Vanity Fair Italia during the Venice Biennale. In 2023 the company introduced NoMa, an itinerant immersive room launched during Milan Design Week, and collaborated with Switzerland for UNHCR on the Eternal Nexus activation at Art Basel, where the NoMa van was used as an immersive space.

== History ==
Valuart was active by mid‑2021, when it announced its first NFT auction centered on a CGI re‑imagining of Banksy’s Spike. Media coverage identified Italian tenor Vittorio Grigolo as a co‑founder of the platform, with the company positioning itself at the intersection of art and non-fungible tokens (NFTs).

The Spike NFT sold for 65 ETH (over US$150,000 at the time).

== Activities and projects ==
=== Banksy’s Spike NFT (2021) ===
Valuart produced a CGI “digital original” of Banksy’s Spike, accompanied by a performance from Grigòlo. The initiative drew international coverage and commentary from intellectual‑property lawyers about authorization and copyright boundaries around NFTs derived from existing artworks.

=== Vanity Fair collaborations (2021–2022) ===
In September 2021, Vanity Fair Italia minted its first NFT magazine cover, produced with Valuart; the work sold for US$25,000 for charity, according to art‑press reporting. In April 2022, Vanity Fair Italia presented MetaVanity, described as the magazine’s first museum in the metaverse, developed in collaboration with Valuart and unveiled in Venice. Subsequent design‑press coverage discussed NFT cover drops created with APENFT and Valuart.

=== NoMa immersive room (2023) ===
During Milan Design Week 2023, Valuart Studio presented NoMa, a mobile immersive room that hosted nightly digital‑art activations across multiple locations in the city.

=== Collaboration with UNHCR at Art Basel (2023) ===
In June 2023, Switzerland for UNHCR announced Eternal Nexus with artist Fabio Giampietro, noting a collaboration with Valuart and the use of the NoMa van as an immersive space during Art Basel in Basel.

=== Directed by Achille Lauro / Hadem (2022–2023) ===
Media outlets reported that the virtual museum Directed by Achille Lauro launched within Hadem (a Valuart‑developed environment) was created in collaboration with Valuart, with statements from CEO Etan Genini on the project’s aims.

=== Skygolpe at Foundry, Dubai (2023–2024) ===
In November 2023, Foundry (Downtown Dubai) hosted Skygolpe: Third Dimension, curated by Giuseppe Moscatello and produced by Valuart; the show ran until January 2024.

=== AGH1 at Foundry (2024) ===
In early 2024, the installation AGH1 by Kim Asendorf, Andreas Gysin and Leander Herzog, curated by Moscatello and supported by Valuart, was presented at Foundry, Dubai (16 February–24 March 2024).

== Valuart Gallery ==
Valuart operates a gallery space in Lugano Paradiso. Local press reported exhibitions including a 2023 display built around an unpublished work attributed to René Magritte, presented within an “Untitled” series at Valuart Gallery in Lugano‑Paradiso.

In November 2023 the gallery hosted Jesse Draxler: U&I 1.5, announced and reviewed by Italian art press as a solo exhibition in Lugano presented in collaboration with Valuart. In 2025, *Corriere Art Collection* credited “Courtesy of Valuart Lugano” for Draxler’s cover artwork Roots for the la Lettura series.

== Key people ==
- Vittorio Grigòlo – co‑founder; opera singer and owner of the original Spike rock featured in Valuart’s first drop.
- Etan Genini – co‑founder and CEO (identified in arts‑press and project coverage).
- Michele Fiscalini – co‑founder

== See also ==
- Non-fungible token
- Digital art
- Metaverse
