= Max Getz =

American jeweler (1896–1954)

- Died: July 23, 1954; Cincinnati, Ohio
- Occupation: Jeweler
- Known for: Mayor's Jewelers, Getz Jewelers, Udall & Ballou
- Relatives: Jack Getz, Charles Getzug, Harry Getzug, Samuel Getz, Irving Getz, Mollie Sachs, Rose Silberstein, Belle Schuler

Max Getz was an American jeweler and philanthropist who founded Mayor's Jewelers and was recognized as one of the country’s foremost authorities on gems.

== Early life and education ==
Max Getz was born in 1896 the son of Anna (née Richter) and Herman Getzug. His given name was Mayor, which he used for his jewelry business, replacing it with Max for his personal life.

Getz attended Woodward High School, Cincinnati. He was a veteran of World War I.

== History ==
Upon returning from the Army, Getz began his business career with two employees, a clerk and a porter in an old arcade in Cincinnati. He opened Mayor Jewelry Company, his first jewelry store, at 608 Vine Street, Cincinnati, Ohio. He expanded and headed the Mayor Company at various downtown sites, and opened store in Dayton and Hamilton, Ohio and Indianapolis.

Getz was the president of Udall and Ballou on Fifth Avenue, New York City, as well as president and treasurer of the Mayor Jewelry Company. The Udall and Ballou store at 685 Fifth Avenue was the first jewelry concern to move north of 42nd Street.

== Yonkers Raceway ==
Max Getz was a member of the Algam Corporation harness group who purchased the Yonkers Raceway property for $2.4 Million and developed the racetrack. Nathan E. Herzfeld, Joseph Henschel and Max Getz were the leaders in the formation of Algam. Getz and Henschel sold their interests to Old Country Trotting Association who assumed control of the racetrack, after which Herzfeld sold his interest in 1952.

== Philanthropy ==
Getz was the director of a Cleveland orphanage, a member of the board of governors of Hebrew Union College and prominent in Jewish Welfare Fund drives.

== Personal life ==
Max Getz was married to Constance and resided at 7864 Ridge Road, Amberley Village. He was a member of Isaac M. Wise Temple, Crest Hills Country Club, the Cincinnati Club, and the National Jeweler's Credit Association.

He had four brothers, Harry, Samuel, Jack and Charles, all jewelers, and three sisters, Belle, Mollie, and Rose. His brothers operated Mayor Jewelry Company of Cincinnati, Getz Jewelry Company of Cincinnati, Getz Jewelry Company of Walnut Hills, Getz Jewelry Company of Norwood, the Mayor Jewelry Company of Dayton, the Barney Jewelry Company of Indianapolis, and the Mayor Jewelry Company of Florida. His brother Jack ran a chain of ten jewelry stores in Cincinnati. His brother Charles ran the Dayton jewelry store for 30 years and was killed by a gunman in the store in December 1969.

His brother Samuel moved to Miami and opened the first Mayor's Jewelry store on Flagler Street. By 1991, Samuel’s son Irving Getz had become the owner of Mayor’s Jewelers, with 11 stores in South Florida and one in Orlando, Florida.

== Death ==
Max Getz died of a heart attack while dining with his wife. He set up a Trust Fund for charity with half going to Hebrew Union College and half to be distributed among the Community Chest of Cincinnati and Hamilton County, the National Conference of Christians and Jews and the Jewish Center.
