= Roden =

Roden is a name of Germanic origin, originally meaning "red valley" or an anglicization of the Gaelic name "O'Rodain". It may refer to:

== Places ==
- Roden, Bavaria, a town in the Main-Spessart district of Bavaria, Germany
- Roden, Netherlands, a town in the province of Drenthe, Netherlands
- Rodén, a village in Fuentes de Ebro municipality of the Province of Zaragoza, Spain
- Roden Crater, a volcanic cone in Arizona
- Roden, Shropshire, a village in England
- Roden, the German name for Zagăr Commune, Mureș County, Romania
- Roden, Sweden, the name of the coastal folkland corresponding to today's Roslagen in Sweden, divided into a northern part, Tiundalands roden, and a southern part, Attundalands roden
- Roden, Ukraine, a former city of the Kievan Rus' era on the Dnieper
- The River Roden, Berkshire, a tributary of the River Pang in England
- The River Roden, Shropshire, a tributary of the River Tern in England

== People ==
- Alan Roden (born 1999), American baseball player
- Benjamin Roden (1902–1978), American religious leader
- Claudia Roden (born 1936), British cookbook writer and cultural anthropologist
- Dan Roden (born 1950), American medical researcher
- David Roden (born 1969), FOH Audio Engineer to many international music artists
- Earl of Roden, a title in the Peerage of Ireland
- Helen Roden (born 1986), former college basketballer and Australian rules footballer
- Henry Roden (1874-1966), Swiss-American prospector, lawyer and politician
- Holland Roden (born 1986), actress
- Karel Roden (born 1962), Czech actor
- Roden Brothers, silversmiths
- Roden Cutler (1916–2002), Australian diplomat
- Roden Noel (1834–1894), English poet

== See also ==
- Rodden (disambiguation)
- Rodin (surname)
