= Gustav Christensen =

Gustav Christensen may refer to:

- Gustav S. Christensen (1929–2007), Danish mathematician and engineer
- Gustav Christensen (footballer) (born 2004), Danish footballer
