= New Orleans Silversmiths =

Jewelry retailer in Louisiana, U.S.

- Company type: Private
- Industry: Jewelers, Silversmiths
- Founded: New Orleans, Louisiana 1938
- Founder: Karl Dingeldein
- Headquarters: 600 Chartres St; New Orleans, USA 70130
- Area served: Worldwide
- Key people: Paul J. Leaman, Jr.
- Website: www.neworleanssilversmiths.com

New Orleans Silversmiths is a jewelry and silverware retailer that specializes in both contemporary and antique gold jewelry, as well as antique holloware. It was established in 1938 by Karl Dingeldein, a third generation silversmith from Hanau, Germany who had emigrated to the US. The Dingeldein family's long tradition of metal work and silver manufacture, both in Germany and the U.S., is well documented. The present owners acquired the business in 1966 and for many years it has been located near the center of the French Quarter, the oldest part of the city. The shop handles new and estate silverware and jewelry.

== Background ==
New Orleans Silversmiths is a family-owned business that sells silver products. New Orleans Silversmiths' signature items are cocktail shakers, corkscrews, sterling silver animals and antique jewelry such as Fleur de Lis jewelry. For a brief time, the shop also sold fine silver bars, with a New Orleans Silversmiths hallmark, in 5, 10 and 25 ounce sizes.

New Orleans Silversmiths Inc. is a member of Jewelers of America.
