= Rodden (disambiguation) =

Rodden is a village and former municipality in the district Saalekreis, Saxony-Anhalt, Germany.

Rodden may also refer to:

== Places ==
- Rodden, Somerset, a village in England

== People ==
- Beth Rodden (born 1980), American rock climber
- Bradley Rodden (born 1989), New Zealand cricketer
- Brock Rodden (born 2000), American baseball player
- Eddie Rodden (1901–1986), Canadian ice hockey player
- James Rodden, American attorney
- Jonathan Rodden (born 1971), American political scientist
- Kathryn Rodden, Australian conservationist
- Keith Rodden (born 1981), American stock car racing crew chief
- Lindsay Rodden, British playwright
- Lois Rodden (1928–2003), Canadian astrologer
- Mike Rodden (1891–1978), Canadian sports journalist
- Tom Rodden, British computer scientist

== See also ==
- Roden (disambiguation)
- Roddon, a dried raised bed of a watercourse such as a river or tidal creek
