= Birks Group =

Canadian jewellery company (1879)

Birks Group Inc.
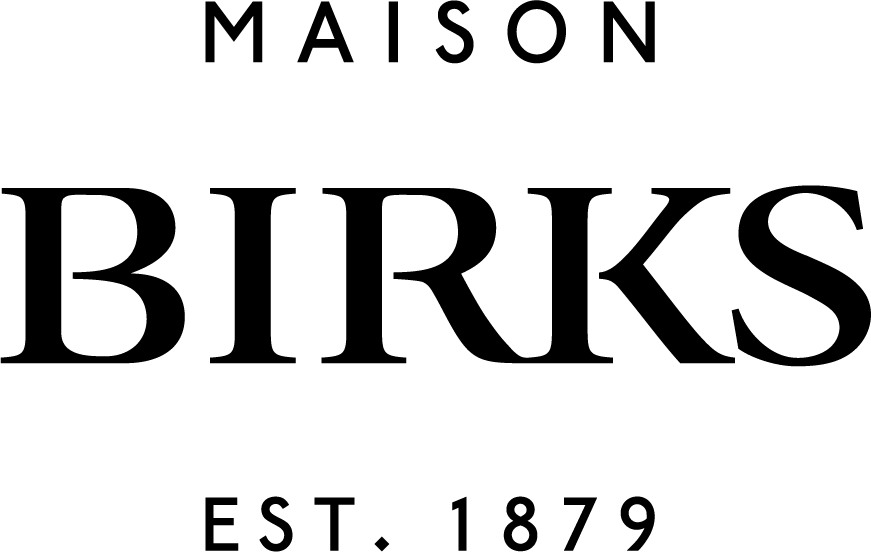
- The logo of the Birks banner on a jewellery box
- Type: Public
- Traded as: AMEX: BGI
- Industry: Luxury goods
- Founded: 1879
- Founder: Henry Birks
- Headquarters: Montreal, Quebec, Canada
- Number of locations: 30
- Key people: Jean-Christophe Bédos (CEO)
- Revenue: ▲ C$225 million (2024) (2025)
- Operating income: ▲ C$77.5 million (2024) (2025)
- Net income: C$20 millions $ (2025)
- Number of employees: 418 (2025)
- Website: maisonbirks.com

Birks Group Inc. (formerly Birks & Mayors Inc.) is a designer, manufacturer, and retailer of jewellery, timepieces, silverware and gifts, with stores and manufacturing facilities located in Canada and the United States. The Group was created in November 2005 through the merger of Henry Birks and Sons Ltd. (Canada) and Mayors Jewelers Inc. (United States).

The company is headquartered in Montreal, Quebec, with American corporate offices located in Tamarac, Florida.

== History ==
=== Henry Birks and Sons ===
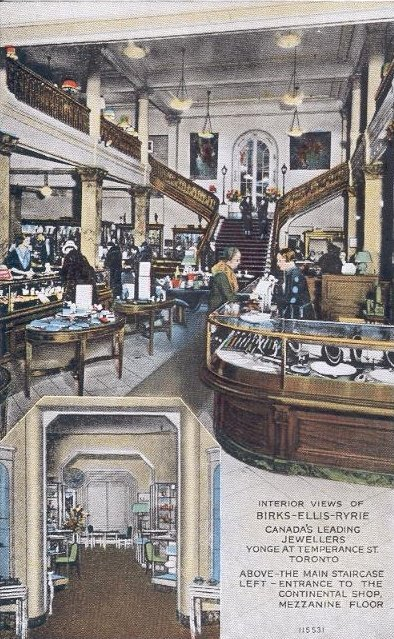
An advertisement for a Birks-Ellis-Ryrie Jewellers in Toronto, c. 1920

Birks Group traces its origins to the opening by Henry Birks of a small jewellery shop in Montreal in 1879.

With an investment of CAD$3,000, Henry Birks opened in 1879 a small jewellery shop on Saint James Street in the heart of Montreal's financial and commercial district. In 1893, Birks entered into a partnership with his three sons (William, John and Gerald), and the name of the firm became Henry Birks and Sons. As the focus of Montreal's commercial centre moved northward towards Saint Catherine Street, the Birks store moved to new premises on Phillips Square in 1894, where the company still maintains a store and corporate offices.

Starting in 1901, Birks oversaw the expansion of the company across Canada, with stores opening in the country's largest cities. In some cases, it bought local jewellers, adding its name to the local one (the Birks store in Toronto was Birks-Ryrie and the one in Winnipeg was Birks-Dingwall). The store on Phillips Square in Montreal opened in 1907.

In 1934, Birks received a Royal Warrant of Appointment. In December 1934, Birks opened its first store in Vancouver. In 1954, the first Canadian shopping centre opened in Dorval and Birks is the first to open a jewelry store within a shopping centre.

In 1953, Henry Birks and Sons bought out Roden Bros. Ltd., a company that produced silver hollowware, flatware, cut crystal, and medals.

In 1955, the company successfully sued the City of Montreal before the Supreme Court of Canada for forcing it to close on Catholic holidays, in Henry Birks & Sons (Montreal) Ltd v Montreal (City of).

On July 8, 2025, Birks Group announced the acquisition of the luxury watch and jewellery business of European Boutique from its owners, the Sutkiewicz family, as well as a licensing agreement to operate the Canadian brand Diamonds Direct. As part of the acquisition and licensing agreements, both Jordan Sutkiewicz and Michelle Ceresney (Co-CEO's of Diamonds Direct and co-owners of European Boutique) remained with the company for a period of time in consulting roles. Headquartered in Toronto, European Boutique operates stores at Yorkdale Shopping Centre, Square One Shopping Centre, CF Toronto Eaton Center and CF Sherway Gardens.

=== Regaluxe Group ===
In 1993 Jonathan Birks sold the company to Italy-based Iniziativa Regaluxe SrL. The Birks Group is now publicly traded under the ticker symbol BGI.

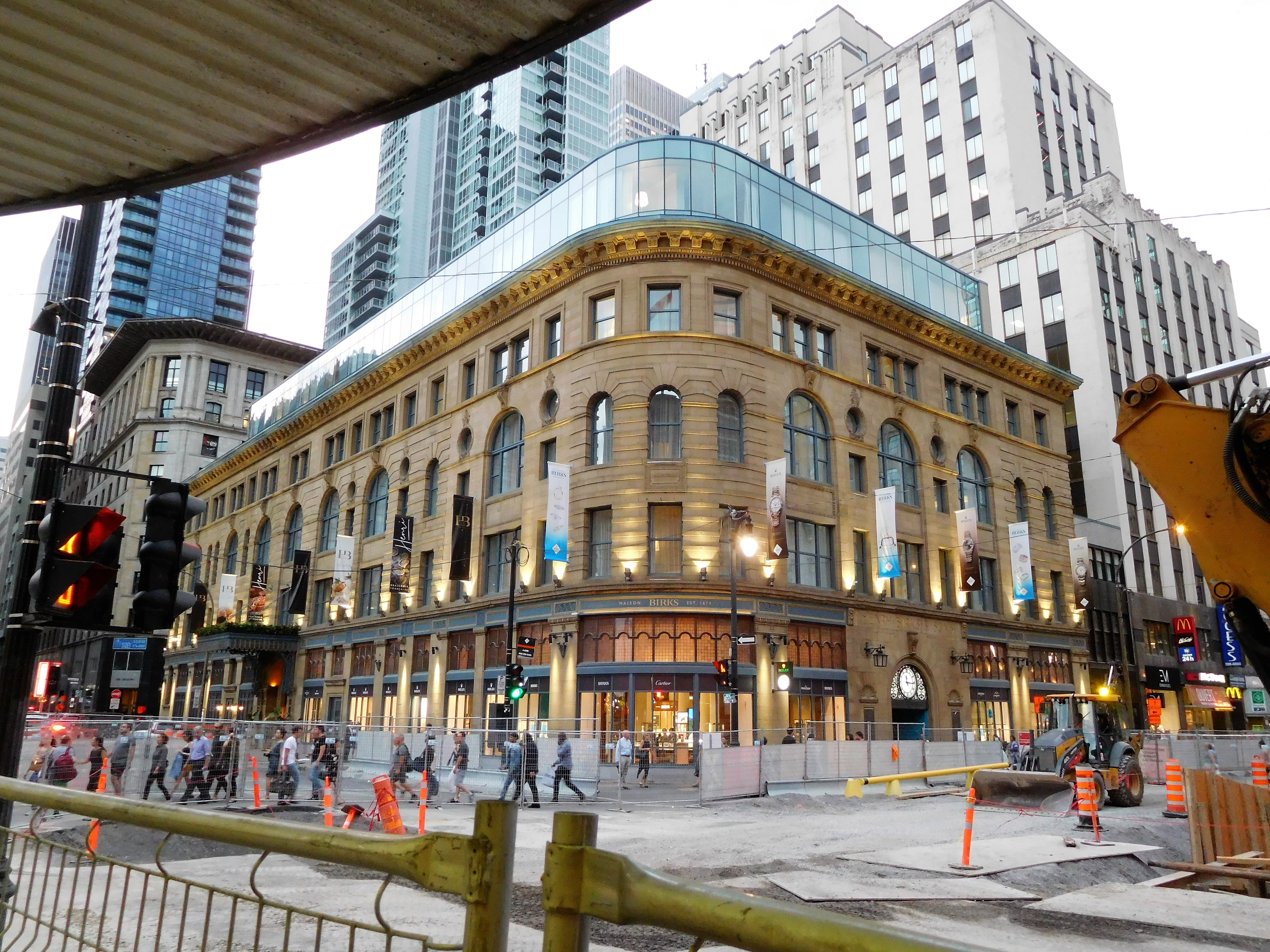
The company's flagship store at Phillips Square in Montreal. The building was renovated in 2001.

In 2001, the company completely renovated its flagship store on Phillips Square in Montreal.

In November 2005, Henry Birks and Sons Ltd. and the American Mayors Jewelers Inc. merged to create the Birks & Mayors Group.

In 2007, Birks was named as the official supplier of jewellery for the 2010 Winter Olympics in Vancouver. The Ottawa store on Sparks Street became a source of gifts to official parliamentary visitors during its existence. The freestyle skier Jennifer Heil was a spokeswoman for the company.

In 2013, the birks group changed its name from Birks & Mayors to the Birks Group.

In 2015, Birks caused some controversy after Canadian Prime Minister Justin Trudeau's wife, Sophie Grégoire-Trudeau, wore a number of their pieces to meet the Queen, Elizabeth II. One of the jewels was a maple leaf brooch that Birks had loaned to her. Since this brooch was worth $7,125, it raised questions regarding the ethics of such a loan.

=== UK development ===
The Birks Group sold the Mayors chain (founded in 1910 in Ohio) to Aurum in 2017. As part of the agreement between Birks and Aurum, the Birks Brand collections of fine jewelry will continue to be offered in 16 locations in the U.S. through the Mayors network. This transaction allowed the company to develop internationally, starting with the UK in October 2017.

A month after it launched in the UK, Birks made headlines when Meghan Markle wore a pair of 18K yellow gold and opal earrings for her official engagement announcement to Prince Harry. This publicity increased the demand for the brand on digital stores and some inventories sold out. Meghan Markle supposedly holds Birks among her favorite jewellery brands, bought at least seven Birks pieces for approximately $20,000.

== Activities ==
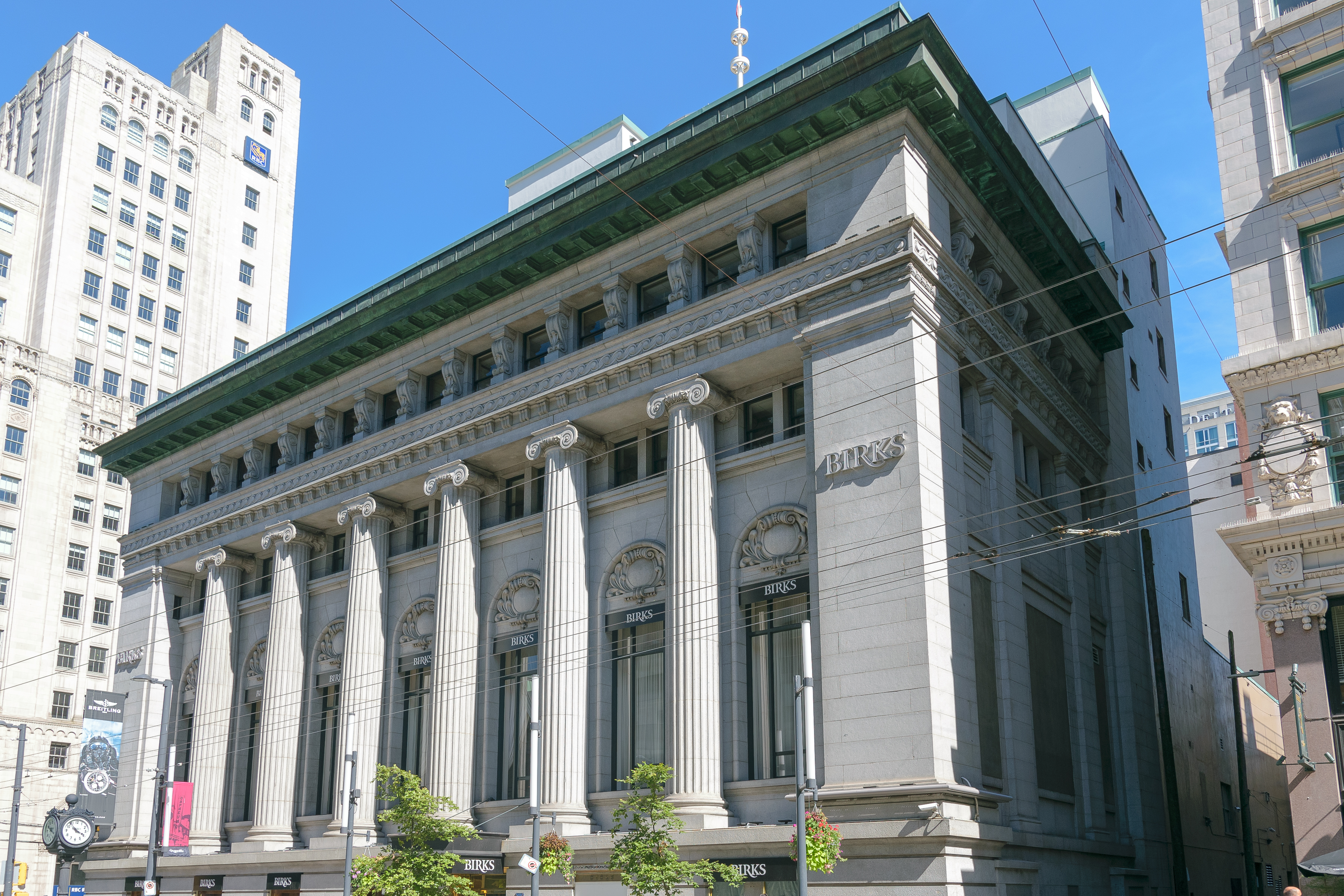
Maison Birks' Vancouver flagship store

Maison Birks is a designer, manufacturer and retailer of jewellery, timepieces, silverware and gifts, with stores and manufacturing facilities located in Canada and the United States. As of October 2017, it operates stores under two different retail banners: 28 Maison Birks stores across Canada (formerly Birks) and 2 Brinkhaus stores in Vancouver and Calgary.

Maison Birks has six flagship stores in Montreal, Ottawa, Toronto, Calgary, Edmonton and Vancouver.

The company also operates one Rolex-branded store in Orlando.

== Awards ==
- 1998: Diamond International award
- 2004: Diamonds: Nature's Miracle award
- 2018: World Branding Awards

== Archives ==
There is a Birks Family fonds at Library and Archives Canada. Archival reference number is R1481.
