= Rodin (surname) =

Rodin is a surname. Notable people with the surname include:

- Alexandr Rodin (1947–2022), Belarusian painter
- Alexey Grigoryevich Rodin (1902–1955), Soviet general
- Auguste Rodin (1840–1917), French sculptor, for whom is named:
  - Rodin (crater), a crater on Mercury
  - 6258 Rodin, an asteroid
  - Rodin (film), a 2017 film about Auguste Rodin
- Burton Rodin (born 1933), American mathematician
- Dmitry Rodin (1912–1992), Red Army officer
- Georgy Rodin (1897–1976), Red Army general
- Gil Rodin (1906–1974), American jazz saxophonist
- Ivan Rodin (born 1987), Russian football player
- Janko Rodin (1900–1974), Croatian football player
- Judith Rodin (born 1944), American university administrator
- Nikolay Ivanovich Rodin (1924–2013), Soviet pilot
- Odile Rodin (1937–2018), French actress
- Oleh Rodin (born 1956), Russian football player
- Oleksandr Rodin (born 1975), Ukrainian composer
- Ryan Rodin (born 2006), French footballer
- Viktor Rodin (1928–2011), Soviet general

== See also ==
- Roden
- Rodina
- Rodin Platform, a theorem proving tool for the B-Method
