= Mohamed E. El-Hawary =

Egyptian-born Canadian scientist (1943–2019)

- Born: February 3, 1943; Sohag, Egypt
- Died: July 26, 2019 (aged 76); Halifax, Nova Scotia
- Education: University of Alexandria, University of Alberta
- Known for: Electric power system studies, fuzzy set theory, and fuzzy logic, Artificial Neural Networks
- Spouse: Ferial (nee El-Bibany) El-Hawary (m. 1966)
- Children: Robert (Bob), Ron, and Bette,
- Awards: IEEE Canada General A.G.L. McNaughton Gold Medal, 1999; IEEE Educational Activities Board Meritorious Achievement Award, 1999; IEEE Power Engineering Educator of the Year Award; EIC Canadian Pacific and the Julian C. Smith Medals, 2001; IEEE Canada W.S. Read Outstanding Service Medal, 2010
- Scientific career
- Fields: Mathematics, Electrical Engineering, Computational Intelligence
- Workplaces: Dalhousie University
- Thesis: Application of Functional Analysis Optimization Techniques to the Economic Scheduling of Hydro-Thermal Electric Power Systems (1972)
- Doctoral advisor: Gustav S. Christensen
- Website: El-Hawary.org

Mohamed (Mo) El-Aref El-Hawary (Arabic: محمد الهواري; born 3 February 1943 in Sohag – died 26 July 2019 in Halifax), was an Egyptian-born Canadian scientist of electric power system studies and the involvement of traditional/modern optimization algorithms, fuzzy systems, and artificial neural networks in their applications. El-Hawary was a mathematician, electrical engineer, computational intelligence researcher and professor of electrical and computer engineering at Dalhousie University.

El-Hawary served as general chair for many conferences. He is a lecturer for the IEEE Power and Energy Society (IEEE-PES), the IEEE Industry Applications Society (IEEE-IAS), and IEEE Canada. Also, he is a fellow of IEEE, EIC, CAE, and CCPE.

In electric power systems engineering, El-Hawary pioneered computational and artificial intelligence solutions to problems such as: power flow analysis, optimal power flow, economic load dispatching, unit commitment, power system stability, power system protection and relaying, power system quality, power system security, power system communication and networking, control theory, fuzzy system, artificial neural network, etc. Additionally, he authored the book Electric Power system Design and Analysis, an academic textbook about electric power engineering.

== Biography ==
=== Personal life ===
Mohamed El-Aref El-Hawary was born in Alexandria, Egypt on 3 February 1943 to Mahmoud Fahmy El-Hawary. El-Hawary graduated from Abbasia Senior High in 1960 with a General Secondary Education Certificate and his name was listed on the first outstanding students list, which granted him admittance to the University of Alexandria. In 1965, El-Hawary graduated there with a BSc in Electrical Power Engineering and subsequently received a scholarship from Izaak Walton Killam Memorial to study Ph.D. in the same field at the University of Alberta (1968-1972) with G. S. Christensen. Before travelling to Canada, he married Ferial El-Bibany, who became the president of IEEE Canada in the period between 2008 and 2009. They have two sons, Robert (Bob) and Ron El-Hawary, and one daughter, Bette.

El-Hawary died on Friday July 26, 2019 at the Halifax Infirmary QE II Hospital in Halifax, Nova Scotia, Canada.

=== Academic life ===
El-Hawary has taught electrical and computer engineering at DalTech (previously known as Technical University of Nova Scotia (TUN)) of Dalhousie University since September 1981.

Between January 1974 to December 1980, El-Hawary served on engineering faculty at Memorial University of Newfoundland and was Chair of Electrical Engineering. He was Associate Professor of Electrical Engineering at COPPE, Federal University of Rio de Janeiro, Brazil, in the period between May 1972 to December 1973. He was an Instructor, in the Departments of Electrical Engineering, at the Universities of Alexandria and Alberta. In 1960, El-Hawary graduated from Abbasia Senior High, Alexandria, Egypt. He has a B.Sc. from the University of Alexandria (Class of 1965), and a Ph.D. in electrical engineering, the University of Alberta (1968-1972), Edmonton, where he was an Izaak Walton Killam Memorial fellow.

El-Hawary was a registered PEng. in the Association of Professional Engineers of Nova Scotia. He was a member of the founding committee responsible for establishing the IEEE Newfoundland and Labrador Subsection in 1975, and served in various capacities in the Subsection. El-Hawary served as Chair of IEEE Canada's Publications Committee, IEEE Canada Recognition and Awards Committee IEEE Canada, (1994-1998), Chair Recognition Working Group of the Power Systems Engineering Committee, IEEE, and Chair of IEEE Main Prize Paper Awards Committee. He was a Member of the IEEE Awards Board.

He was Chair of Power Engineering Education Committee's Life Long Learning Subcommittee, and chaired the Operating Economics Subcommittee in the Power Engineering Society. El-Hawary was President Canadian Society for Electrical Engineering and vice-president of Engineering Institute of Canada (1986–88). He wrote eleven textbooks and monographs, was author of over 162 referred Journal articles, 199 conference papers, and supervisor of 62 graduate students. El-Hawary was a member of the editorial board of IEEE/OUP Encyclopedia of Electrical and Computer Engineering.

He was founding editor, Power Letters, Power Engineering Society, and associate editor for the three major Electric Machines and Power Systems' Journals. He was also a lecturer for the IEEE Power and Energy Society, the IEEE Industry Applications Society, and IEEE Canada. El-Hawary was Editor of IEEE Expert Now Power Engineering Series, and Electrical Power Engineering, McGraw-Hill Encyclopedia of Science and Technology.

El-Hawary pioneered in many analytical and numerical computations to solve complicated problems of interconnected electric power systems that contains different types and technologies of generating machines, including: thermal, hydro, nuclear, solar, wind, tidal, and other renewable/sustainable/green energy resources. His research interests covered most of the fields of electric power engineering, including: power flow/optimal power flow, power system operation and operational planning, power system dynamic and control, power system protection and relaying, machinery design, smart grids and modern networks, renewable/sustainable/green energy, fuzzy systems and its applications, and artificial neural networks (ANNs) and its applications.

== Medals and awards ==
- 1999: IEEE Canada General A.G.L. McNaughton Gold Medal
- 1999: IEEE Educational Activities Board Meritorious Achievement Award
- 2001: EIC Canadian Pacific and the Julian C. Smith Medals
- 2010: IEEE Canada W.S. Read Outstanding Service Medal
- 20xx: IEEE Power Engineering Educator of the Year Award

== Publications ==
=== Books ===
M. E. El-Hawary's list of books:
11- M. E. El-Hawary, "Introduction to Electrical Power Systems", Wiley-IEEE Press, November 2008.
10- M. E. El-Hawary, " Principles of Electric Machines and Power Electronics", Wiley-IEEE Press, 2002.
9- M. E. El-Hawary, "Electrical Energy Systems", CRC Press, 2000.
8- James A. Momoh, and M. E. El-Hawary, "Electric Power System Dynamics and Stability with Artificial Intelligence Applications", Marcel Dekker, 2000.
7- M. E. El-Hawary, "Fuzzy Power System Applications", IEEE Press, 1998.
6- M. E. El-Hawary, Electric Power system Design and Analysis, Revised Edition, IEEE Press, 1995.
5- G. S. Christensen, M.E. El-Hawary, and S. Soliman, Applications of Optimal Control in Electric Power Systems, New York, Plenum Press, 1987.
4- M. E. El-Hawary, Principles of Electric Machines with Power Electronic Applications, Englewood Cliffs, N.J., Prentice-Hall (Reston), 1986.
3- M. E. El-Hawary, Control Systems Engineering, Englewood Cliffs, NJ, Prentice-Hall (Reston), 1984.
2- M. E. El-Hawary, Electric Power system Design and Analysis, Englewood Cliffs, N.J., Prentice-Hall (Reston), 1983.
1- M. E. El-Hawary, and G.S. Christensen, Optimal Economic Operation of Electric Power Systems, New York, Academic Press, 1979.

=== Edited work ===
M. E. El-Hawary's list of contributions to edited work:
7- Zbigniew A. Styczynski, Krzysztof Rudion, and Mohamed E. El-Hawary "Offshore Wind Energy Conversion", McGraw-Hill Yearbook of Science & Technology, 2015, 12, McGraw-Hill.
6- Maxwell Muchayi and El-Hawary, M.E., "Reactive Power", Wiley Encyclopedia of Electrical and Electronics Engineering, Vol. 18, pp. 257–262.
5- El-Hawary, M. E., "Reactive Power Compensation", Electrical Engineering Handbook, CRC Press, R. C. Dorf, editor, 1997.
4- El-Hawary, M. E., " Generation Management and Economic Operation of Power Systems", Electrical Technology in Industry, Grosvenor Press, London, 1991.
3- El-Hawary, M.E., Electric Power Systems, an article for the 1986 Edition of World Book Encyclopedia.
2- El-Hawary, M.E., and Christensen, G.S., Optimal Operation of Large Scale Power Systems, in Advances in Control Theory and Applications, C.T. Leondes, Ed., Academic Press, 1977.
1- Shamaly, A., Christensen, G.S., and El-Hawary, M.E., "Application of the Ricatti Equation to Finding Initial Values in Ill-Conditioned Control Systems", in Information Linkage between Applied Mathematics and Industry, Schoenstadt, A.L., ed., Academic Press, 1980.

=== Presentations ===
M. E. El-Hawary's list of presentations:
1- Mohamed E. El-Hawary, " Recent Research Results in Hydrokinetic technology at Dalhousie University", Marine and Hydrokinetic (MHK) Generation (panel session) – IEEE PES GM 2014, United States, Maryland, National Harbor, MD, USA.
2- Mohamed E. El-Hawary, "Impact of Renewable Energy Resources on the Electrical Power System Stability", ECED Seminar Series McGill University, Canada, Quebec, Montreal.

=== Full refereed journal papers ===
M. E. El-Hawary's list of full refereed journal papers:
162- Mohamed E. El-Hawary, "The Smart Grid—State-of-the-art and Future Trends", Electric Power Components and Systems "Special Issue: The Smart Grid—State-of-the-art and Future Trends", 42(3-4), pp. 239–250, 2014.
161- Aly, H.H.H.; and El-Hawary, M.E., "A Proposed ANN and FLSM Hybrid Model for Tidal Current Magnitude and Direction Forecasting," IEEE Journal of Oceanic Engineering, Volume: PP, Issue: 99, DOI: 10.1109/JOE.2013.2241934, pp. 1–6, 2013.
160- Aaron MacNeill, Mohamed El-Hawary and Sue Molloy, "Submarine power cable performance evaluation for marine energy applications," Journal of Ocean Technology, Vol. 8, No. 1, pp. 104–118, 2013.
159- Kamel N.A. Al-Tallaq, H.D. Al-Sharai, El-Hawary, M.E., "Online algorithm for removal of decaying DC-offset from fault currents," Electric Power Systems Research, Vol. 81, No. 7, pp. 1627–1629, July 2011.
158- Abu-Mouti, F.S., El-Hawary, M.E., "Optimal Distributed Generation Allocation and Sizing in Distribution Systems via Artificial Bee Colony Algorithm," IEEE Transactions on Power Delivery, Vol. 26, No. 4, DOI: 10.1109/TPWRD.2011.2158246, pp. 2090–2101, 2011.
157- W.G. Morsi, and El-Hawary, M E, "Selection of suitable fuzzy operators for representative power factor evaluation in non-sinusoidal situations," Electric Power Systems Research, Vol. 81, No. 7, pp. 1381–1387, July 2011.
156- W.G. Morsi, and El-Hawary, M E, "On the application of wavelet transform for symmetrical components computations in the presence of stationary and non-stationary power quality disturbances," Electric Power Systems Research, Vol. 81, No. 7, pp. 1373–1380, July 2011.
155- Morsi, W.G., Diduch, C.P., Liuchen Chang, El-Hawary, M.E., "Wavelet-Based Reactive Power and Energy Measurement in the Presence of Power Quality Disturbances," IEEE Transactions on Power Systems, Vol. 26, No. 3, DOI: 10.1109/TPWRS.2010.2093545, pp. 1263–1271, 2011.
154- W.G. Morsi, and El-Hawary, M E, "Power Quality evaluation in smart grids considering modern distortion in electric power," Electric Power Systems Research, Vol. 81, No. 5, pp. 1117–1123, May 2011.
153- Abu-Mouti, F.S., and El-Hawary, M.E., "Heuristic curve-fitted technique for distributed generation optimisation in radial distribution feeder systems," IET Proceedings, Generation, Transmission & Distribution, Vol. 5, No. 2, pp. 172–180, February 2011.
152- W.G. Morsi, and El-Hawary, M E, "Novel power quality indices based on wavelet packet transform for non-stationary sinusoidal and non-sinusoidal disturbances," Electric Power Systems Research, Vol. 80, No. 7, pp. 753–759, July 2010.
151- Farhat, I.A., El-Hawary, M.E., "Dynamic adaptive bacterial foraging algorithm for optimum economic dispatch with valve-point effects and wind power," IET Generation, Transmission & Distribution, Vol. 4, No. 9, pp. 989–999, 2010.
150- Eajal, A. A., El-Hawary, M. E., "Optimal Capacitor Placement and Sizing in Unbalanced Distribution Systems with Harmonics Consideration Using Particle Swarm Optimization Power Delivery," IEEE Transactions on Power Delivery, Vol. 25, No. 3, 2010.
149- AlHajri, M. F., El-Hawary, M. E., "Exploiting the Radial Distribution Structure in Developing a Fast and Flexible Radial Power Flow for Unbalanced Three-Phase Networks," IEEE Transactions on Power Delivery, Vol. 25, No. 1, pp. 378–389, 2010.
148- Morsi, W.G., El-Hawary, M.E., "Time-frequency single-phase power components measurements for harmonics and inter-harmonics distortion based on wavelet packet transform; Part II: case studies and results," Canadian Journal of Electrical and Computer Engineering, Vol. 35, No. 1, DOI: 10.1109/CJECE.2010.5783379, pp. 8–14, 2010.
147- Morsi, W.G., El-Hawary, M.E., "Time-frequency single-phase power components measurements for harmonics and inter-harmonics distortion based on Wavelet Packet transform; Part I: Mathematical formulation," Canadian Journal of Electrical and Computer Engineering, Vol. 35, No. 1, DOI: 10.1109/CJECE.2010.5783378, pp. 1–7, 2010.
146- Farhat, I, and El-Hawary, M E, "Optimization Methods Applied for Solving the Short-Term Hydrothermal Coordination Problem" Electric Power Systems Research, Vol. 79, No. 9, pp. 1308–1320, 2009.
145- Morsi, Walid, and El-Hawary, M E, "Wavelet Packet Transform Based Power Quality Indices for Balanced and Unbalanced Three-Phase Systems under Stationary or Non-stationary Operating Conditions," IEEE Transactions on Power Delivery, Vol. 24, No. 4, pp. 2300–2310, Oct. 2009.
144- Morsi, Walid, and El-Hawary, M E, "A new reactive, distortion and non-active power measurement method for non-stationary waveforms using wavelet packet transform," Electric Power Systems Research, Vol. 79, No. 10, pp. 1408–1415, 2009.
143- Morsi, Walid, and El-Hawary, M E, "Fuzzy-Wavelet Based Electric Power Quality Assessment of Distribution Systems under Stationary and Nonstationary Disturbances," IEEE Transactions on Power Delivery, Vol. 24, No. 4, pp. 2099–2106, Oct. 2009.
142- Farhat, I, and El-Hawary, M E, "Application of Interior Point Methods in Optimum Operational Scheduling of Electric Power Systems," IET Proc. Generation, Transmission & Distribution, Vol. 3, No. 11, pp. 1020–1029, 2009.
141- Dukpa, A., Venkatesh B., and M. El-Hawary, "Application of Continuation Power Flow Method in Radial Distribution Systems," Electric Power Systems Research, Vol. 79, No. 11, pp. 1503–1510, November 2009.
140- Morsi, W. G., and El-Hawary, M. E., "On the implementation of time-frequency transforms for defining power components in non-sinusoidal situations: A survey," Electric Power Components and Systems, Vol. 37, No. 4, pp. 373–392, 2009.
139- AlRashidi M. R., and El-Hawary M. E., "A Survey of Particle Swarm Optimization Applications in Electric Power Systems," IEEE Transactions on Evolutionary Computation, Vol. 13, No. 4, pp. 913–918, Aug. 2009.
138- AlRashidi M. R., and El-Hawary M. E., "Applications of computational Intelligence Techniques for Solving the Revived Optimal Power Flow problem," Electric Power Systems Research, Vol. 79, No. 4, pp. 694–702, April 2009.
137- Bashir, Zidan and El-Hawary, M. E., "Applying Wavelets to Short-Term Load Forecasting using PSO Based Neural Networks," IEEE Transactions on Power Systems, Vol. 24, No. 1, pp. 20–27, Feb. 2009.
136- Morsi, W. G., and El-Hawary, M. E., "On the appropriate monitoring period for voltage flicker measurement in the presence of distributed Generation," Electric Power Systems Research, Vol. 79, No. 4, pp. 557–561, April 2009.
135- Morsi, W. G., and El-Hawary, M. E., "A New Perspective for the IEEE Standard 1459-2000 via Stationary Wavelet Transform in the Presence of Non-stationary Power Quality Disturbance," IEEE Transactions on Power Delivery, Vol. 23, No. 4, pp. 2356–2365, Oct. 2008.
134- Morsi, W. G., and El-Hawary, M. E., "A New Fuzzy-Based Representative Quality Power Factor for Unbalanced three-phase Systems with Non-sinusoidal Situations," IEEE Transactions on Power Delivery, Vol. 23, No.4, pp. 2426–2438, October 2008.
133- Walid G. Morsi and M. E. El-Hawary, closure on "Reformulating power components definitions contained in the IEEE Standard 1459-2000 using Discrete Wavelet Transform," IEEE Trans. On Power Delivery, Vol. 23, No. 3, pp. 1699–1699, July 2008.
132- Morsi, W. G., and El-Hawary, M. E., "A New Fuzzy-Based Total Demand Distortion Factor for Non-sinusoidal Situations," IEEE Transactions on Power Delivery, Vol. 23, No. 2, pp. 1007–1014, April 2008.
131- Morsi, W. G., and El-Hawary, M. E., "A New Fuzzy-Based Representative Quality Power Factor for Non-sinusoidal Situations," IEEE Transactions on Power Delivery, Vol. 23, No. 2, pp. 930–936, April 2008.
130- AlRashidi M. R., and El-Hawary M. E., "Hybrid Particle Swarm Optimization Approach for Solving the Discrete OPF Problem Considering the Valve Loading Effects," IEEE Transactions on Power Systems, Vol. 22, No. 4, pp. 2030–2038, Nov. 2007.
129- AlRashidi M. R., and El-Hawary M. E., "A Survey of Particle Swarm Optimization Applications in Electric Power Systems," IEEE Transactions on Evolutionary Computation: Accepted for future publication, DOI: 10.1109/TEVC.2006.880326, 2006.
128- Morsi, W. G., and El-Hawary M. E, "Reformulating Three-Phase Power Components Definitions Contained in the IEEE Standard 1459–2000 Using Discrete Wavelet Transform," IEEE Transactions on Power Delivery, Vol. 22, No. 3, pp. 1917 – 1925, July 2007.
127- Morsi, W. G., and El-Hawary, M. E., "Reformulating Power Components Definitions Contained in the IEEE Standard 1459–2000 Using Discrete Wavelet Transform, IEEE Transactions on Power Delivery, Vol. 22, No. 3, pp. 1910-1916, July 2007 .
126- Alrashidi, M.R. and El-Hawary, M.E., "Survey of particle swarm optimization applications in power system operations," Electric Power Components and Systems, Vol. 34, No. 12, p 1349–1357, Dec. 2006.
125- El-Hawary, M. E., and Soliman, S. A., "Identification of Individual Types of Harmonic Loads Based on Constrained Least Absolute Value Algorithm," International Journal of Electric Power and Energy Systems, Vol. 26, No. 7, pp. 519–522, 2004.
124- Soliman S A, Alammari R A, El-Hawary M E, "A new digital transformation for harmonics and DC offset removal for the distance fault locator algorithm," International Journal of Electrical Power and Energy Systems, Vol. 26, No. 5, pp. 389–395, Jun. 2004.
123- Soliman S A, Alammari R A, El-Hawary M E, et al., "Long-term electric peak load forecasting for power system planning: A comparative study," Arabian Journal for Science and Engineering, Vol. 29, No.1B, pp. 85–94, Apr. 2004.
122- A. M. Al-Kandari, S. A. Soliman, M. E. El-Hawary, "Fuzzy Short Term Electric Load Forecasting," International Journal of Electric Power and Energy Systems, Vol. 26, No. 2, pp. 111–122, February 2004.
121- S. A. Soliman, R. A. Alammari, M. A. Mostafa, and M. E. El-Hawary, "A Demodulation Technique for Power System Local Frequency and Voltage Measurements," Engineering Journal, University of Qatar, Vol. 16, No. 1, pp. 99–108, 2004.
120- S. A. Soliman, Mantaway, A. H., El-Hawary, M. E., "Simulated annealing optimization algorithm for power systems quality analysis," International Journal of Electrical Power and Energy System, Vol. 26, No. 1, pp. 31–36, January 2004.
119- S. A. Soliman, R. A. Alammari, M. E. El-Hawary, "Frequency and Harmonics Evaluation in Power Networks Using Fuzzy Regression Technique," Electric Power Systems Research Journal, Vol. 66, No. 2, pp. 171–177, August 2003.
118- S. A. Soliman. M. A. Mostafa, M. E. El-Hawary, and A. M. Al-Kandari, "Two Digital Filtering Algorithms for Fast Estimation of Symmetrical Components in a Power System," Electric Power Systems Research Journal, Vol. 66, No. 2, pp. 133–137, August 2003.
117- S. F. Mekamer, M. E. El-Hawary, S. A. Soliman, and M. A. Moustafa, "Application of Fuzzy Logic for Reactive Power Compensation of Radial Distribution Feeder," IEEE Transactions on Power Systems, Vol. 18, No. 1, pp. 206–213, February 2003.
116- Mantawy A H, Soliman S A, El-Hawary M E, "Power system frequency estimation based on simulated annealing. Part I: A constant frequency study," Arabian Journal for Science and Engineering, Vol. 28, No. 1B, pp. 45–55, Apr. 2003.
115- A. H. Mantaway, S. A. Soliman, and M. E. El-Hawary, "An innovative Simulated Annealing Approach to Long- Term Hydro Scheduling Problem," International Journal of Electrical Power and Energy Systems, Vol. 25, No.1, pp. 41–46, 2003.
114- S. A. Soliman, R. A. Al-Ammari, A. H. Mantaway, and M. E. El-Hawary, "Park’s Transformation application for Power System Harmonics Identification and Measurements," Electric Power Systems Components Journal (Formerly Electric Machines and Power Systems Journal, Vol. 31, No.8, pp. 777–789, 2003.
113- A. H. Mantawy, S. A. Soliman, M. E. El-Hawary, "The long-term hydro-scheduling problem-a new algorithm," Electric Power Systems Research, Vol. 64, No.1, pp. 67–72, 2003.
112- Dondo, M. G., and El-Hawary, M. E., "An Approach to Implement Electricity Metering in Real-time using Artificial Neutral Networks," IEEE Transactions on Power Delivery, Vol. 18, No. 2, pp. 383–386, April 2003.
111- S. A. Soliman, R. A. Alammari, H. K. Temraz, and M. E. El-Hawary, "Fuzzy Linear Parameter Estimation Algorithms: A New Formulation," International Journal of Electrical Power and Energy Systems, Vol. 24, No.5, pp. 415–420, 2002.
110- S. F. Mekamer, S. A. Soliman, M. A. Mustafa, and M. E. El-Hawary, "Load Flow of Radial Distribution Feeders: A New Contribution," International Journal of Electrical Power and Energy Systems, Vol. 24, No. 9, pp. 701–707, 2002.
109- S. A. Soliman, M. H. Abdel-Rahman, E. Al-Attar, and M. E. El-Hawary, "An Algorithm for Estimating Fault Location in an Unbalanced Three-Phase Power Systems," International Journal of Electric Power and Energy Systems, Vol. 24, No. 7, pp. 515–520, 2002.
108- S. A. Soliman, R. A. Alammari, H. K. Temraz, and M. E. El-Hawary, "Long-Term Electric Peak Load Forecasting for Power System Planning: A Comparative Study," Accepted for Arabian Journal of Science and Engineering, July 2002.
107- S. F. Mekamer, M. E. El-Hawary, S. A. Soliman, M. A. Moustafa, and M. M. Mansour, "New Heuristic Strategies for Reactive Power Compensation of Radial Distribution Feeders," IEEE Transactions on Power Delivery, Vol. 17, No. 4, pp. 1128–1135, 2002.
106- El-Gallad, A. I., El-Hawary, M. E., Sallam, A. A, "Swarming of intelligent particles for solving the nonlinear constrained optimization problem," International Journal of Engineering Intelligent Systems for Electrical Engineering and Communications, Vol. 9, No. 3, pp. 155–163, September 2001.
105- M. E. El-Hawary, S. A. Soliman, and R. A. Alammari, "Fuzzy Time Domain and Z-Transform Modeling for Harmonic Electric Loads," The Arabian Journal for science and Engineering, Vol. 26, No. 1B, pp. 19–27, 2001.
104- M. E. El-Hawary and G. A. Bortignon, "Loss Reduction in Primary Distribution Feeders: A Review of Capacitor Placement Techniques," Paper 1262, accepted August 12, 1999 for publication in Electric Power and Energy Systems, 2000.
103- S. A. Soliman, and M. E. El-Hawary, "Measurement of Power Systems Voltage and Flicker Levels for Power Quality Analysis: A Static LAV State Estimation Based Algorithm," International Journal of Electrical Power and Energy Systems, Vol. 22, No. 6, pp. 447–450, 2000.
102- Soliman, S. A., and El-Hawary, M. E., "Measurement of Voltage Flicker Magnitude and Frequency in Power Systems for Power Quality Analysis," Electric Machines and Power Systems, Vol. 27, No. 12, pp. 1279–1288, December 1999.
101- Soliman, S. A., and El-Hawary, M. E., "A Digital Estimation Algorithm for Impedance Measurements," Electric Machines and Power Systems, Vol. 27, No. 12, pp. 1289–1298, December 1999.
100- Muchayi, Maxwell, and El-Hawary, M. E., "A Method for Optimal Pricing of Electric Supply Including Transmission System Considerations," Electric Power Systems Research, Vol. 50, No. 1, pp. 43–46, May 1999.
99- El-Hawary, M. E., "Applications of Artificial Neural Networks in Operational Planning of Electric Power Systems," Engineering Intelligent Systems, Vol. 7, No. 1, pp. 49–61, March 1999.
98- Momoh, J. A., El-Hawary, M. E., and R. Adapa, "A Review of Selected Optimal Power Flow Literature to 1993: Part I," IEEE Transactions on Power Systems, Vol. 14, No. 1, pp. 96–104, February 1999.
97- Momoh, J. A., El-Hawary, M. E. and R. Adapa, "A Review of Selected Optimal Power Flow Literature to 1993: Part II," IEEE Transactions on Power Systems, Vol. 14, No. 1, pp. 105–111, February 1999.
96- Muchayi, Maxwell, and El-Hawary, M. E., "A Summary of Algorithms in Reactive Power Pricing," International Journal of Electrical Power and Energy Systems, Vol. 21, No. 2, pp. 119–124, 1999.
95- Soliman, S. A., A. M. Al-Kandari and M. E. El-Hawary, "Parameter Identification of a Separately Excited DC Motor for Speed Control," Electric Machines and Power Systems, Vol. 26, No. 8, pp. 831–838, 1998.
94- Mostafa, M. A., El-Hawary, M. E., Mbamalu G. A. N., El-Arabaty A. M., Mansour, M. M., and El-Naggar, K. M., "A Summary of Algorithms in Optimal Load Shedding and Generation Re-Allocation in Power System Studies; Part II," Electric Machines and Power Systems, Vol. 26, No. 3, pp. 277–286, 1998.
93- Soliman, S. A., Mansour H. Abdel Rahman, and M. E. El-Hawary, "Linear Kalman Filtering Algorithm Applied to Measurements of Power System Voltage Magnitude and Frequency: A Constant Frequency Model," Canadian Journal of Electrical and Computer Engineering, Vol. 22, N0. 4, pp. 145–154, 1997.
92- Soliman, S. A., Mansour H. Abdel Rahman, and M. E. El-Hawary, "Application of Fuzzy Linear Regression Algorithm to Power System Voltage Measurements," Electric Power System Research, Vol. 42, No. 3, pp. 195–200, 1997.
91- Soliman, S. A., Persaud, S., El-Nagar, K., and M. E. El-Hawary, "Application of Least Absolute Value Parameter Estimation Based on Linear Programming to Short Term Load Forecasting," International Journal of Electrical Power and Energy Systems, Vol. 19, No. 3, pp. 209–216, March 1997.
90- Soliman, S. A., Abbasy, N. H., and El-Hawary, M. E., "Frequency Domain Modelling and Identification of Nonlinear Loads using a Least Error Squares Algorithm," Electric Power Systems Research, Vol. 40, No. 1, pp. 1–6, 1997.
89- Mostafa, M. A., El-Hawary, M. E., Mbamalu G. A. N., El-Arabaty A. M., Mansour, M. M., and El-Naggar, K. M., "A Summary of Algorithms in Optimal Load Shedding and Generation Re-Allocation in Power System Studies; Part I," accepted for publication in Electric Machines and Power Systems..
88- Soliman, S. A., A. M. Al-Kandari, and El-Hawary, M. E., "Time Domain Estimation Techniques for Harmonic Load Models," Electric Machines and Power Systems, Vol. 25, No. 8, pp. 885–896, 1997.
87- Mbamalu, G. A. N., Ferial and M. E. El-Hawary, "Decomposition Approach to Forecasting Electric Power System Commercial Load using an Artificial Neural Network," Electric Machines and Power Systems, Vol. 25, No. 8, pp. 875–884, 1997.
86- Mostafa, M. A., El-Hawary, M. E., Mbamalu, G., Mansour, M. M., El-Nagar, K. M., and El-Arabaty, A. M., "A Computational Comparison of Steady State Load Shedding Approaches in Electric Power Systems," IEEE Transactions on Power Systems, Vol. 12, No. 1, pp. 30–37, February 1997.
85- T. Denise King, M. E. and Ferial El-Hawary, "Using Hopfield Neural Network for Economic and Environmental Dispatching of Electric Power Systems," Canadian Journal of Electrical and Computer Engineering, accepted 12/02/1996.
84- Mostafa, M. A., El-Hawary, M. E., Mansour, M. M., El-Nagar, K. M., and El-Arabaty, A. M., "Steady State Load Shedding Schemes: A Performance Comparison," Electric Power Systems Research, Vol. 38, No. 2, pp. 105–112, 1996.
83- Zhang, Weiming, and El-Hawary, M. E., "Excitation Control in a Synchronous Machine Via an Artificial Neural Network," Engineering Intelligent Systems, Vol. 5, No. 1, pp. 29–34, March 1997.
82- Soliman, S. A., A. M. Al-Kandari, and El-Hawary, M. E., "Procedures for Measuring Local Frequency and Voltage Phasor Magnitude of Distorted Voltages for Power System Relaying," Electric Power Systems Research, Vol. 38, No. 2, p. 145-51, Aug. 1996.
81- Soliman, S. A., and El-Hawary, M. E., "Application of Kalman Filtering for On-line Estimation of Symmetrical Components for Power System Protection," Electric Power Systems Research, Vol. 38, No. 2, pp. 113–23, Aug. 1996.
80- King, R. L., and El-Hawary, M. E., "Electric Power Engineering Resources 1993-94," IEEE Transactions on Power Systems, Vol. 11, No. 3, pp. 1146–1158, August 1996.
79- J. H. Talaq, Ferial and M. E. El-Hawary, "Minimum Emissions Power Flow using Newton's Method and its Variants," Electric Power Systems Research, Vol. 39, No. 3, pp. 233–239, 1996.
78- Mostafa, M. A., El-Hawary, M. E., Mansour, M. M., El-Nagar, K. M., and El-Arabaty, A. M., "Performance Evaluation of Two Optimal Load Shedding Policies in Electric Power Systems," Electric Machines and Power Systems, Vol. 25, No. 2, pp. 199–214, February 1997.
77- Mostafa, M. A., El-Hawary, M. E., Mansour, M. M., El-Nagar, K. M., and El-Arabaty, A. M., "Effects of Prioritizing Demand on Optimal Load Shedding Policy," International Journal of Electric Energy and Power Systems, Vol. 18, No. 7, pp. 415–424, Oct. 1996.
76- Soliman, S. A., A. M. Al-Kandari, S. Persaud, K. M. El-Nagar and M. E. El-Hawary, "Short Term Load Forecasting using Weighted Least Absolute Value Filters," Electric Machines and Power Systems, Vol. 25, No. 3, pp. 295–304, 1997.
75- J. H. Talaq, Ferial and M.E. El-Hawary, "Static Minimum Emissions Power Flow," Electric Machines and Power Systems, Vol. 24, No. 5, pp. 521–532, 1996.
74- Soliman, S. A., M. El-Arini, A. M. Al-Kandari and M. E. El-Hawary, "Frequency Domain Parameter Identification of Harmonic Potential Transformer Models using Least Squares Techniques," Electric Power Systems Research, Vol. 35, No. 1, pp. 45–49, Oct. 1995.
73- Mbamalu, G. A. N., Ferial and M. E. El-Hawary, "Minimum Emissions Hydro-Thermal Power Flow," Electric Machines and Power Systems, Vol. 24, No. 8, pp. 833–846, 1996.
72- Mostafa, M. A., El-Hawary, M. E., Mansour, M. M., El-Nagar, K. M., and El-Arabaty, A. M., "A Study of Estimation Techniques for Frequency Relaying Algorithms," Canadian Journal of Electrical and Computer Engineering, Vol. 21, No. 1, pp. 9–20, 1996.
71- Mbamalu, G. A. N., and El-Hawary, M. E., "Hydro-Thermal Power System Loss Minimization: A Probabilistic Perturbation Approach," Electric Machines and Power Systems, Vol. 24, No. 7, pp. 745–756, 1996.
70- Soliman, S. A., El-Arini, M. M., Al-Kandari, A. M., El-Hawary, M. E., "Parameters identification of potential transformers models in the frequency domain based on an estimation algorithm," Modelling, Measurement and Control, Vol. A62, No. 3, pp. 35–50, 1995.
69- Soliman, S. A., A. M. Al-Kandari and M. E. El-Hawary, "Linear Kalman Filter Algorithm for Analysis of Transient Stability Swings in Large Interconnected Power Systems," Electric Power Systems Research, Vol. 35, No. 3, pp. 173–178, September 1995.
68- Mostafa, M. A., El-Hawary, M. E., Mansour, M. M., El-Nagar, K. M., and El-Arabaty, A. M., "Optimal Dynamic Load Shedding using a Newton Based Dynamic Algorithm," Electric Power Systems Research, Vol. 34, No. 3, pp. 157–163, September 1995.
67- Mbamalu, G. A. N., Ferial El-Hawary, and M. E. El-Hawary, "Effects of Load Modelling on Minimum Loss, Minimum Emissions, and Multiple Objective Optimal Hydro-Thermal Power Flow," Electric Power Systems Research, Vol. 34, No. 2, pp. 97–108, August 1995.
66- King, T. D., El-Hawary, M. E., and Ferial El-Hawary, "Optimal Environmental Dispatching of Electric Power Systems Via an Improved Hopfield Neural Network", IEEE Transactions on Power Systems, Vol. 10, No. 3, pp. 1559–1565, August 1995.
65- G. A. N. Mbamalu, M. E. El-Hawary and F. El-Hawary, "A Comparison of Probabilistic Power Flow with Deterministic Based Solutions," Electric Machines and Power Systems, Vol. 24, No. 5, pp. 511–520, 1996.
64- El-Hawary, M. E., and S. T. Ibrahim, "A New Approach to AC/DC Load Flow Analysis," Electric Power Systems Research, Vol. 33, No. 3, pp. 193–200, 1995.
63- G. A. N. Mbamalu, M. E. El-Hawary and F. El-Hawary, "NOX Emission Modelling Using the Iteratively Reweighted Least Square Procedures," International Journal of Electric Energy and Power Systems, Vol. 17, No. 2, pp. 129–136, 1995.
62- Soliman, S. A., Al-Kandari, A. M., El-Nagar, K., and M. E. El-Hawary, "A New Dynamic Filter Based on Least Absolute Value Algorithm for On-line Tracking of Power System Harmonics," IEE Proceedings, Generation, Transmission and Distribution, Vol. 142, No. 1, pp. 37–44, January 1995.
61- Mbamalu, G. A. N., M. E. El-Hawary, and F. El-Hawary, "A Pseudo Inverse Probabilistic Power Flow Approach," Electric Machines and Power Systems, Vol. 23, No. 2, pp. 107–118, March–April 1995.
60- J. H. Talaq, Ferial and M. E. El-Hawary, "Minimum Emissions Power Flow- The Time Interval Approach," International Journal of Electrical Power and Energy Systems, Vol. 16, No. 1, pp. 17–22, 1994.
59- J. H. Talaq, Ferial and M. E. El-Hawary, "A Summary of Environmental/Economic Dispatch," IEEE Transactions on Power Systems, Vol. 9, No. 3, pp. 1508–1516, August 1994.
58- J. H. Talaq, Ferial and M.E. El-Hawary, "Static Minimum Emissions Power Flow," Electric Machines and Power Systems, Vol. 22, No. 6, pp. 699–710, November–December 1994.
57- J. H. Talaq, Ferial and M.E. El-Hawary, "Minimum Emissions Power Flow," IEEE Transactions on Power Systems, Vol. 9, No. 1, pp. 429–435, February 1994.
56- J. H. Talaq, Ferial and M.E. El-Hawary, "A Sensitivity Analysis Approach to Minimum Emissions Power Flow," IEEE Transactions on Power Systems, Vol. 9, No. 1, pp. 436–442, February 1994.
55- M. E. El-Hawary, "Artificial Neural Networks and Possible Applications to Desalination," Desalination, Vol. 92, No. 1-3, pp. 125–147, July 1993.
54- L. G. Dias, and M. E. El-Hawary, "OPF Incorporating Load Models Maximizing Revenue," IEEE Transactions on Power Systems, Vol. 8, No. 1, pp. 53–59, February 1993.
53- Mbamalu G. A. N. and El-Hawary M. E., "Load Forecasting Via Sub-Optimal Seasonal Autoregressive Models and IRWLS Estimation," IEEE Transactions on Power Systems, Vol. 8, No. 1, pp. 343–349, February 1993.
52- L. G. Dias, and M. E. El-Hawary, "Effects of Loads Fed by Fixed Tap Transformers on Conventional OPF Solutions," Electric Machines and Power Systems, Vol. 20, No. 5, pp. 505–512, September–October 1992.
51- El-Hawary, M. E., and Ravindranath, K. M., "Hydro-Thermal Power Flow Scheduling Accounting for Head Variations," IEEE Transactions on Power Systems, Vol. 7, No. 5, pp. 1232–1238, August 1992.
50- L. G. Dias and M. E. El-Hawary, "Security Constrained OPF: Influence of Fixed Tap Transformer Fed Loads," IEEE Transactions on Power Systems, Vol. 6, No. 4, pp. 1366–1372, November 1991.
49- El-Hawary, M. E., and Ravindranath, K. M., "Combining Loss and Cost Objectives in Daily Hydro-Thermal Economic Scheduling", IEEE Transactions on Power Systems, Vol. 6, No. 3, pp. 1106–1112, August 1991.
48- M. E. El-Hawary and G. A. N. Mbamalu, "A Comparison of Probabilistic Perturbation and Deterministic Based Optimal Power Flow Solutions," IEEE Transactions on Power Systems, Vol. 6, No. 3, pp. 1099–1105, August 1991.
47- M. E. El-Hawary, and K. M. Ravindranath, "A General Overview of Multiple Objective Optimal Power Flow in Hydrothermal Electric Power Systems," Electric Machines and Power Systems, Vol. 19, No. 3, pp. 313–327, May–June 1991.
46- M. E. El-Hawary and G. Mbamalu, "Modeling the Incremental Cost and Water Conversion Functions For Hydrothermal Coordination Studies," Electric Machines and Power Systems, Vol. 19, No. 3, pp. 271–285, May–June 1991.
45- L. G. Dias and M. E. El-Hawary, "Effects of Load Modeling in Security Constrained OPF Studies," IEEE Transactions on Power Systems, Vol. 6, No. 2, pp. 87–93, February 1991.
44- El-Hawary, M. E., and Mbamalu, G. A. N., "Hydro-Thermal Stochastic Optimal Power Dispatch: A Newton's Based Approach," IEE Proceedings, Vol. 137, Part C, No. 3, pp. 213–224, May 1990.
43- El-Hawary, M. E., and Ravindranath, K. M., "Selection of Objectives in Minimum Loss Power Flow in Hydro Thermal Electric Power Systems," International Journal of Electric Power and Energy Systems, Vol. 12, No. 4, pp. 298–302, 1990.
42- G. A. N. Mbamalu, and M. E. El-Hawary, "Short Term Power System Load Forecasting Using the Iteratively Reweighted Least Squares Algorithm," Electric Power Systems Research, Vol. 19, No. 1, pp. 11–22, July 1990.
41- El-Hawary, M. E., and Ravindranath, K. M., "Minimum Loss Versus Minimum Cost Power Flow in Hydro Thermal Electric Power Systems," IEE Proceedings, Part C, 1990.
40- El-Hawary, M. E., and Dias, L. G., "A Comparison of Load Models and Their Effect on The Convergence of Newton's Power Flows," International Journal of Electric Power and Energy Systems, Vol. 12, No. 1, pp. 3–8, 1990.
39- Dias, L. G., and El-Hawary, M. E., "Effects of Active and Reactive Power Modeling in Optimal Load Flow Studies," IEE Proceedings, Part C, Vol. 136, No. 5, pp. 259–263, 1989.
38- El-Hawary, M. E., and Dias, L. G., "Load Modeling in Optimal Power Flow Recognizing Voltage Limits," Electric Machines and Power Systems, Vol. 17, No. 1, pp. 15–28, 1989.
37- Ravindranath, K. M., and El-Hawary, M. E., "Minimum Loss Power Flow in Hydro Thermal Electric Power Systems Based on Kron's Loss Formula," Electric Machines and Power Systems, Vol. 16, No. 3, pp. 149–156, 1989.
36- Dias, L. G., and El-Hawary, M. E., "Nonlinear Parameter Estimation Experiments for Static Load Models in Electric Power Systems," IEE Proceedings, Part C, Vol. 136, No. 2, pp. 68– 77, 1989.
35- Ravindranath, K. M., and El-Hawary, M. E., "Comparative Study of Different Formulations in Hydro-Thermal Optimal Power Flow Problems," Electric Machines and Power Systems, Vol. 16, No. 2, pp. 89–105, 1989.
34- El-Hawary, M. E., and Mbamalu, G. A. N., "Stochastic Optimal Load Flow Using a Combined Quasi-Newton and Conjugate Gradient Technique," International Journal of Electric Power and Energy Systems, Vol. 11, No. 2, pp. 85–93, April 1989.
33- Ravindranath, K. M., and El-Hawary, M. E., "Minimum Loss Power Flow in Hydro Thermal Electric Power Systems," Electric Power Systems Research, Vol 16, No. 3, pp. 195–208, 1989.
32- El-Hawary, M. E., and Mbamalu, G. A. N., "Stochastic Optimal Load Flow Using a Newton-Raphson Iterative Technique," Electric Machines and Power Systems, Vol. 15, No. 6, DOI: 10.1080/07313568808909347, pp. 371–380, 1988.
31- El-Hawary, M. E., and K. M. Ravindranath, "Effects of Hydro Models on Optimal Operation of Variable Head Hydro-Thermal Systems," Canadian Electrical Engineering Journal, Vol. 13, No. 3-4, pp. 112–119, 1988.
30- Ravindranath, K. M., and El-Hawary, M. E., "The Hydro thermal Optimal Power Flow Problem in Rectangular Coordinates," Electric Machines and Power Systems, Vol. 14, No. 5, pp. 295–315, 1988.
29- Dias, L. G., and El-Hawary, M. E., "Electric Power System Static Load Models Parameter Estimation Using Newton's Method," Electric Machines and Power Systems, Vol. 14, No. 5, pp. 317–328, 1988.
28- El-Hawary, M. E., and K. M. Ravindranath, "Optimal Operation of Variable Head Hydro-Thermal Systems Using the Glimn-Kirchmayer Model and the Newton-Raphson Method," Electric Power Systems Research, Vol. 14, No. 1, pp. 11–22, 1988.
27- El-Hawary, M. E., and Dias, L. G., "Bus Sensitivity to Load Model Parameters in Load Flow Studies," Proceedings of IEE, Part C., Vol. 134, No. 4, pp. 302–305, July 1987.
26- El-Hawary, M. E., and Dias, L. G., "Incorporation of Load Models in Load Flow Studies: Form of Model Effects," Proceedings of IEE, Part C., Vol. 134, No. 1, pp. 27–30, January 1987.
25- El-Hawary, M. E., and Dias, L. G., "Selection of Buses for Detailed Modeling in Load Flow Studies," Electric Machines and Power Systems, Vol. 12, No. 2, pp. 83–92, 1987.
24- El-Hawary, M. E., and Ravindranath, K. M., "Optimal Economic Operation of Thermal and Variable Head Hydro Systems Using Hamilton-Lamont Model and Newton-Raphson Method," Electric Machines and Power Systems, Vol. 12, No. 2, pp. 93–122, 1987.
23- El-Hawary, M. E., and Kumar, M., "Optimal Parameter Estimation for Hydro plant Performance Models," IEEE Transactions on Power Systems, Vol. PWRS- 1, No. 4, pp. 126–131, November 1986.
22- El-Hawary, M. E., and Tsang, D. H., "The Hydrothermal Optimal Load Flow: A Practical Formulation and Solution Techniques Using Newton's Approach," IEEE Transactions on Power Systems, Vol. PWRS- 1, No. 3, pp. 157–167, August 1986.
21- El-Hawary, M. E., and Tsang, D. H., "Optimal Load Flow in Hydro-Thermal Systems," Electric Machines and Power Systems, Volume 11, Number 5, pp. 367– 386, 1986.
20- El-Hawary, M. E., Rao, R. S, and Christensen, G.S., "Optimal Hydro-Thermal Load Flow," Optimal Control Applications and Methods, Vol. 7, No. 4, DOI: 10.1002/oca.4660070402, pp. 337–354, October–December 1986.
19- El-Hawary, M. E., and Wellon, O. K., "The Alpha-Modified Quasi-Second Order Newton-Raphson Method for Load Flow Solutions," IEEE Transactions on Power Apparatus and Systems, Vol. PAS-101, No. 4, DOI: 10.1109/TPAS.1982.317151, pp. 854–866, April 1982.
18- El-Hawary, M. E., and Mansour, S. Y., "Performance Evaluation of Parameter Estimation Algorithms for Economic Operation of Power Systems," IEEE Transactions on Power Apparatus and Systems, Vol. PAS-101, No. 3, DOI: 10.1109/TPAS.1982.317270, pp. 574–582, March 1982.
17- El-Hawary, M. E., and Landrigan, J. K., "Optimum Operation of Fixed Head Hydro-Thermal Electric Power Systems: Powell's Hybrid Method Versus Newton-Raphson Method," IEEE Transactions on Power Apparatus and Systems, Vol. PAS-101, No. 3, DOI: 10.1109/TPAS.1982.317267, pp. 547–554, March 1982.
16- El-Hawary, M. E., and Mansour, S. Y., "Optimal Parameter Estimation Algorithms for Basic Problems of Economic Operation in Electric Power Systems," Optimal Control Applications and Methods, Vol.2, No. 3, DOI: 10.1002/oca.4660020306, pp. 269–288, July–September 1981.
15- Shamaly, A., Christensen, G. S., and El-Hawary, M. E., "Optimal Control of a Large Turbo Alternator," Journal of Optimization Theory and Applications, Vol.34, No. 1, DOI: 10.1007/BF00933358, pp. 83–97, May 1981.
14- Nieva, R., Christensen, G. S., and El-Hawary, M. E., "Optimal Load Scheduling of Nuclear-Hydro-Thermal Power Systems," Journal of Optimization Theory and Applications, Vol. 35, No. 2, DOI: 10.1007/BF00934580, pp. 261–275, October 1981.
13- Shamaly, A., Christensen, G. S., and El-Hawary, M. E., "Realistic Feedback Control of Turbo Alternators," Journal of Optimization Theory and Applications, Vol.35, No. 2, DOI: 10.1007/BF00934579, pp. 251–259, October 1981.
12- Shamaly, A., Christensen, G. S., and El-Hawary, M. E., "On the Solution of Ill-Conditioned Optimality Conditions for Control of Turbo-Alternators", Journal of Optimal Control Applications and Methods, Vol. 2, No. 1, DOI: 10.1002/oca.4660020108, pp. 81–87, January 1981.
11- El-Hawary, M. E., and Christensen, G. S., "Optimal Active-Reactive Hydro thermal Schedules Using Functional Analysis," Journal of Optimal Control Applications and Methods, Vol. 1, No. 3, DOI: 10.1002/oca.4660010305, pp. 239–249, July 1980.
10- Shamaly, A., Christensen, G. S., and El-Hawary, M. E., "A Transformation for Necessary Optimality Conditions for Systems with Polynomial Nonlinearities," IEEE Transactions on Automatic Control, Vol. 24, No. 6, DOI: 10.1109/TAC.1979.1102189, pp. 983–985, December 1979..
9- El-Hawary, M. E., "Optimum Hydro-Thermal Electric Energy System Scheduling: Challenges and Opportunities for Research and Development in Canada," Canadian Electrical Engineering Journal, Vol. 4, No. 1, pp. 33–36, 1979..
8- Nieva, R., Christensen, G. S., and El-Hawary, M. E., "Suboptimal Control of a Nuclear Reactor Using Functional Analysis," International Journal of Control, Vol. 26, No. 1, DOI: 10.1080/00207177708922296, pp. 145– 156, 1977.
7- El-Hawary, M. E., and Christensen, G. S., "Optimal Operation of Multi-chain Hydro-Thermal Power Systems," Canadian Electrical Engineering Journal, Vol. 1, No. 2, pp. 52–62, 1976.
6- El-Hawary, M. E., "Further Comments on a Note on the Inversion of Complex Matrices," IEEE Transactions on Automatic Control, Vol. AC-20, No. 2, DOI: 10.1109/TAC.1975.1100887, pp. 279–280, April 1975.
5- El-Hawary, M. E., and Christensen, G. S., "Hydrothermal Load Flow Using Functional Analysis," Journal of Optimization Theory and Applications, Vol. 12, No. 6, pp. 576–587, December 1973.
4- El-Hawary, M. E., and Christensen, G. S., "Extension to Functional Analysis Optimization of Common Flow Hydro-Thermal Systems", IEEE Transactions on Power Apparatus and Systems, Vol. PAS-92, No. 1, pp. 356–364, January 1973.
3- El-Hawary, M. E., and Christensen, G. S., "Application of Functional Analysis to Optimization of Electric Power Systems," International Journal of Control, Vol. 16, No. 6, DOI: 10.1080/00207177208932339, pp. 1063–1072, 1972.
2- El-Hawary, M. E., and Christensen, G. S., "Functional Optimization of Common Flow Hydro-Thermal Systems", IEEE Transactions on Power Apparatus and Systems, Vol. PAS-91, No. 5, DOI: 10.1109/TPAS.1972.293507, pp. 1833–1839, September 1972.
1- El-Hawary, M. E., and Christensen, G. S., "Optimum Scheduling of Power Systems Using Functional Analysis," IEEE Transactions on Automatic Control, Vol. AC-17, No. 4, DOI: 10.1109/TAC.1972.1100048, pp. 518–522, August 1972.

== Criticism ==
El-Hawary was often criticized for poor academic performance inside the classroom.
