= Gustav S. Christensen =

Danish-Canadian academic (1929–2007)

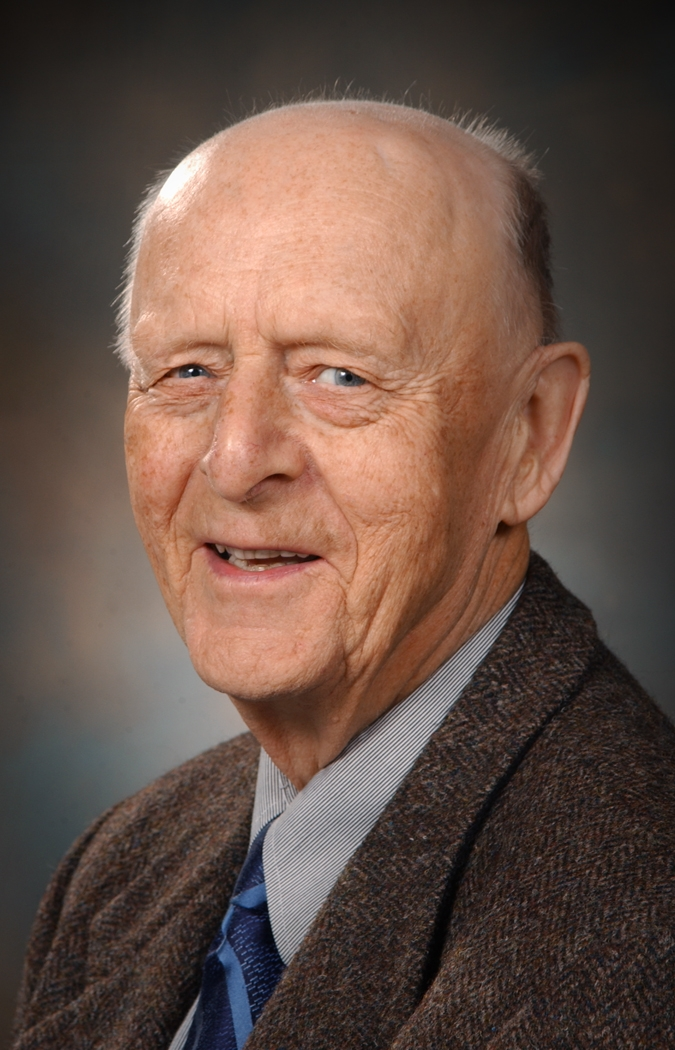
- Christensen in 2004
- Born: Gustav Strøm Christensen; 1 April 1929; Læsø, Denmark
- Died: 9 August 2007 (aged 78); Abbotsford, British Columbia, Canada
- Education: University of Alberta, University of British Columbia
- Known for: Electric power system studies, nonlinear systems, stability theory, and Mathematical optimization
- Spouse: Penelope (née Gardner) Christensen (m. 1969)
- Children: Lynne, Neil
- Awards: Engineering Institute of Canada Prize 1957; Henry Birks Gold Medal in Engineering; CIVIC AWARD – BRITISH COLUMBIA District of Mission: Award for achievement in mathematics, engineering and science. 7 May 2007. Presented by Mayor James Atebe.
- Scientific career
- Fields: Mathematics, Electrical Engineering, Computational Intelligence
- Workplaces: University of Alberta
- Thesis: Aspects of Nonlinear System Stability (1966)
- Doctoral advisor: Avrom Chaim Soudack
- Doctoral students: Mohamed E. El-Hawary, Soliman Abdel-hady Soliman

Gustav Strøm Christensen (1 April 1929 – 9 August 2007) was a Danish-Canadian academic mathematician and engineer. Born in Vesterø on the Danish island Læsø, he first worked as a radio operator in the Danish merchant marine. Later he became a professor of electrical engineering at the University of Alberta in Edmonton, British Columbia for 27 years. In 1957 he won the Engineering Institute of Canada's prize and the Henry Birks Gold Medal in Engineering. He received a B.Sc. in engineering physics from the University of Alberta, Edmonton, in 1958 and a M.A.Sc. from the University of British Columbia, Vancouver in 1960. Later he obtained a Ph.D. in 1966, also in electrical engineering, from the University of British Columbia. Christensen wrote over 140 scientific papers, co-authored four books and four chapters.

== Biography ==
=== Early life ===
Christensen was born 1 April 1929 on a farm on the Danish island of Læsø. The eighth of nine children, Gustav completed 9 years of schooling there in a one-room elementary school and a new junior high school. In 1945 he moved to Copenhagen to take a radio operator apprenticeship. He served with the Danish Merchant Navy for four years and on an American oil tanker for another two as a radio operator.

He emigrated to Canada and in 1969 he married an English immigrant, Penelope Janet Gardner, in Edmonton. They have two children, Lynne and Neil.

=== Academic life ===
After moving to Canada, Christensen completed his high school diploma in six months, mainly through correspondence school in Edmonton. He enrolled in engineering physics at the University of Alberta, where he won the top engineering award, the Henry Birks Gold Medal, in 1958 along with several other scholarships. After a summer with the National Research Council in Ottawa, he took his M.A. Sc. in Electrical Engineering at the University of British Columbia (UBC) in 1960 and subsequently obtained practical industrial experience with the BC Energy Board and Chemcell in Edmonton. He disliked the odours associated with chemical engineering left to complete his Ph.D. at UBC. His thesis (1966) was on the stability of non-linear mathematical models of systems.

In July 1966, he returned to University of Alberta as assistant professor and spent 27 years teaching, researching and taking a large load of administrative responsibilities for the Department of Electrical Engineering. His research was mainly concentrated on the optimum economic operation of various types of power systems, minimizing the energy lost in transmission lines while at the same time using, for example, the water available in all the hydro plants in a system to generate the maximum amount of power. This produced the cheapest energy and the best return on investment. Christensen authored over 140 scientific papers, four books and four chapters in books on his research specialities. Christensen retired as full professor in 1993 and moved to Mission, British Columbia.

=== Electric power industries ===
Christensen was an active intervener in the National Energy Board (NEB) hearings which ultimately resulted in the rejection of the huge SE2 (Sumas Energy 2) coal-fired plant, one that would have emitted unacceptable pollution into the Fraser Valley funnel.

== Final years ==
After retirement, Christensen and his wife joined the Church of Jesus Christ of Latter-day Saints and they both served at the church's Family History Centre in Abbotsford. In co-operation with his wife Penny, a professional genealogist, he wrote his autobiography, the history of his parents' 172 descendants and a volume of translations of historical articles on Læsø. At the age of 75 Christensen took up an adjunct professorship in the School of Engineering Science at Simon Fraser University in Burnaby, BC, where he had an office, a computer and a grad student – but no salary. He spent one or two days there each week until he died. During this time he published a number of papers in the field of asymptotic stability of linear and nonlinear systems, a continuation of his Ph.D. work. He simplified the solutions to Lyapunov's stability theorems so that they are now useful to the electric power engineers and other practical engineers. Another development was the solution of the least absolute value estimation problem originally posed by Laplace in 1750 by using linear programming.

Christensen died 9 August 2007 at the age of 78.

== Academic awards ==
=== Undergraduate ===
- Engineering Institute of Canada (EIC) Prize 1957
- Two University of Alberta First Class Standing Prizes
- One University of Alberta Honor Prize
- Schlumberger Undergraduate Scholarship
- Henry Birks Gold Medal in Engineering, graduated with High Distinction

=== Postgraduate ===
- Northern Electric Fellowship 1958
- National Research Council (NRC) Studentship 1959
- National Research Council (NRC) Studentship 1960
- University of British Columbia Scholarship 1964
- University of British Columbia Scholarship 1965

=== Civic award – British Columbia ===
- District of Mission: Award for achievement in mathematics, engineering and science.
  May 7, 2007. Presented by Mayor James Atebe.

== Scientific communities' memberships ==
- Senior Member, Institute of Electrical and Electronics Engineers (IEEE)
- Associate Member, Canadian Electricity Association (CEA), Canada
- Member, The Association of Professional Engineers and Geoscientists of Alberta (APEGA), Alberta

== Publications ==
=== Theses ===
G.S. Christensen's M.Sc. and Ph.D. Theses:
1- M.Sc. Thesis, Optimization of Conductor Shapes and Configurations of Conductor Bundles for High Voltage Transmission, May, 1960.
2- Ph.D. Thesis, Aspects of Nonlinear System Stability, August 17, 1966.

=== Books ===
G.S. Christensen's List of Books:
1- M.E. El-Hawary and G.S. Christensen, "Optimal Operation of Electric Power Systems." Academic Press, New York, pp. 280, 1979. (This was written on invitation from Richard Bellman, U.C.L.A.)
2- G.S. Christensen, M.E. El-Hawary and S.A. Soliman, "Optimal Control Applications in Electric Power Systems." Plenum Press, New York, pp. 200, May 1987.
3- G.S. Christensen and S.A. Soliman, "Optimal Long-Term Operation of Electric Power Systems." Plenum Press, New York, pp. 310, August 1988.
4- G.S. Christensen, S.A. Soliman and R. Nieva, "Optimal Control of Distributed Nuclear Reactors." Plenum Press, New York, pp. 250, January 1990.

=== Refereed chapters in books ===
G.S. Christensen's List of Refereed Chapters in Books:
1- M.E. El-Hawary and G.S. Christensen. "Optimal Operation of Large Scale Power Systems." In Advances in Control and Dynamic Systems (C.T. Leondes, Editor), Academic Press, New York, Vol.13, pp. 1–70, 1977.
2- A. Shamaly, G.S. Christensen and M.E. El-Hawary. In "Information Linkage Between Applied Mathematics and Industry" (A.L. Schoenstadt et al. Editors), Academic Press, New York, 1980.
3- G.S. Christensen and S.A. Soliman. "Optimization Techniques in Hydroelectric Systems." In Advances in Control and Dynamic Systems, (C.T. Leondes, Editor), Academic Press, New York, Vol.30, pp. 100, in press, Mar 1990.
4- G.S. Christensen, S.A. Soliman and M.Y. Mohamed, "Power Systems State Estimates based on Least Absolute Value (LAV)." Advances in Control and Dynamic Systems Vol.36, 1991, pp. 1–143.

=== Journal papers ===
G.S. Christensen's List of Journal Papers:
1- F. Noakes and G.S. Christensen, The Effect of Conductor Shapes and Arrangement on the Electric Field Intensity of High Voltage Transmission Lines. Transactions E.I.C. Vol.4, No.4, 1960.
2- G.S. Christensen, Cost of Power Transmission at 345KV. A report prepared for the B. C. Power Commission, Victoria, B. C., September 1960.
3- G.S. Christensen and G. J. Berg, Technical and Economical Aspects of Electrical Power Transmission from Plants in System D to Load Centres in the Fraser River Basin. A report prepared for the Fraser River Board, Victoria, B.C., December 1960.
4- Report on the Columbia and Peace River Projects, British Columbia Energy Board, Victoria, B.C., 31 July 1961. (Did preparatory work in this report.)
5- G.S. Christensen, A Control System for Automatic Blending of Solvents. A report prepared for Canadian Chemical Co, Edmonton, July 1962.
6- G.S. Christensen, Criticism of paper entitled - Inside Hydrothermal Coordination by C.W. Watchorn, IEEE Transactions PAS, January 1967.
7- G.S. Christensen, On the Convergence of Volterra Series. IEEE Transactions A.C., Vol.13, p. 736, 1968.
8- R.S. Rao and G.S. Christensen, Bounded-Input Bounded-Output Stability of a Class of Nonlinear Discrete-Data Systems via Contraction Mapping. Int. Journal of Control, Vol.12, No.3, p. 449, 1970.
9- R.S. Rao and G.S. Christensen, A Criterion for the Bounded-Input Bounded-Output Stability of a Discrete-Data System with a Slope-Restricted Nonlinearity. Int. Journal of Control, Vol.12, No.4, p. 637, 1970.
10- R.S. Rao and G.S. Christensen, On the Convergence of a Discrete Volterra Series. IEEE Transactions A.C., Vol.15, p. 140, 1970.
11- G.W. Trott and G.S. Christensen, On the Uniqueness of the Volterra Series. IEEE Transactions A.C., Vol.14, p. 759, 1970.
12- G.S. Christensen and G.W. Trott, On the Inclusion of Initial Conditions in Volterra Series. Int. Journal of Control, Vol.12, No.5, p. 835, 1970.
13- G.W. Trott and G.S. Christensen, A Larger Region of Convergence for the Volterra Series. Int. Journal of Control, Vol.14, p. 377, 1971.
14- A.M.H. Rashed and G.S. Christensen, Response of Nonlinear Sampled Data Systems with Non-Zero Initial Conditions and Response for In-Between Sampling via Volterra Series. IEEE Transactions A.C., Vol.16, p. 269, 1971.
15- B. Bussman and G.S. Christensen, A Comparison Theorem for Stability Investigations. IEEE Transactions A.C., Vol 17, p. 138, 1972.
16- M.E. El-Hawary and G.S. Christensen, Functional Optimization of Common Flow Hydro-Thermal Systems. IEEE Transactions P.A.S., Vol.91, p. 1833, 1972.
17- M.E. El-Hawary and G.S. Christensen, Optimum Scheduling of Power Systems Using Functional Analysis. IEEE Transactions A.C., Vol.17, p. 518, 1972.
18- M.E. El-Hawary and G.S. Christensen, Application of Functional Analysis to Optimization of Electric Power Systems. Int. Journal of Control, Vol.16, No.6, p. 1063, 1972.
19- M.E. El-Hawary and G.S. Christensen, Hydro-Thermal Load Flow Using Functional Analysis. Journal of Optimization Theory and Applications, Vol.12, No.6, p. 576, 1973.
20- M.E. El-Hawary and G.S. Christensen, Extensions to Functional Optimization of Common-Flow Hydro-Thermal Systems. IEEE Transactions P.A.S., Vol.92, p. 356, 1973.
21- D.F. Liang and G.S. Christensen, Comments on "Estimation in Linear Delayed Discrete-Time Systems with Correlated State and Measurement Noises". IEEE Transactions A.C., Vol 20, pp. 176–177, 1975.
22- D.F. Liang and G.S. Christensen, New Filtering and Smoothing Algorithms for Discrete Nonlinear Systems with Time Delays. Int. Journal of Control, Vol.21, No.1, pp. 105–111, 1975.
23- D.F. Liang and G.S. Christensen, Exact and Approximate State Estimation for Nonlinear Dynamic Systems. Automatica, Vol.11, pp. 603–612, 1975.
24- G.S. Christensen and M.E. El-Hawary, Optimal Operation of Multi-Chain Hydro-Thermal Power Systems. Canadian Electrical Engineering Journal, Vol.1, No.2, pp. 52–62, 1976.
25- D.F. Liang and G.S. Christensen, New Filtering and Smoothing Algorithms for Discrete Nonlinear Delayed Systems with Coloured Noise. Int. Journal of Control, Vol.25, pp. 821–825, 1977.
26- D.F. Liang and G.S. Christensen, Estimation Algorithms for Discrete Nonlinear Systems and Observations with Multiple Time Delays. Int. Journal of Control, Vol.23, p. 613, 1976.
27- R. Nieva, G.S. Christensen and M.E. El-Hawary, Suboptimal Control of a Nuclear Reactor Using Functional Analysis. Int. Journal of Control, Vol.26, pp. 145–156, 1977.
28- R. Nieva and G.S. Christensen, Reduction of Reactor Systems. Nuclear Science and Engineering, Vol.64, pp. 791–795, 1977.
29- D.F. Liang and G.S. Christensen, Estimation of Discrete Non-Linear Time-Delayed Systems and Measurements with Correlated and Colored Noise Processes. Int. Journal of Control, Vol.28, pp. 1–10. 1978.
30- A. Shamaly, G.S. Christensen and M.E. El-Hawary, A Transformation for Necessary Optimality Conditions for Systems with Polynomial Nonlinearities. IEEE Transactions A.C., Vol.24, No.6, p. 983, 1979.
31- R. Nieva and G.S. Christensen, Optimal Control of Distributed Nuclear Reactors Using Functional Analysis. Journal of Optimization Theory and Applications, Vol.34, No.3, 1981.
32- M.E. El-Hawary and G.S. Christensen, Optimal Active-Reactive Hydro-Thermal Schedules Using Functional Analysis. Optimal Control Applications and Methods, Vol.1, pp. 239–249, 1980.
33- A. Shamaly, G.S. Christensen and M.E. El-Hawary, Optimal Control of a Large Turbo-Alternator. Journal of Optimization Theory and Applications, Vol.34, No.1, pp. 83–97, 1981.
34- A. Shamaly, G.S. Christensen and M.E. El-Hawary, Solution of Ill-Conditioned Optimality Conditions for Control of Turbo-Alternators. Optimal Control Applications and Methods, Vol.2, pp. 81–87, 1981.
35- A. Shamaly, G.S. Christensen and M.E. El-Hawary, Realistic Feedback Control of Turbo-Generators. Journal of Optimization Theory and Applications, Vol.35, No.2, pp. 251–259, 1981.
36- R. Nieva, G.S. Christensen and M.E. El-Hawary, Optimum Load Scheduling of Nuclear-Hydro-Thermal Power Systems. Journal of Optimization Theory and Applications, Vol.35, No.2, 1981.
37- R. Nieva and G.S. Christensen, Symmetry Reduction of Linear Distributed Parameter Systems. Int. Journal of Control, Vol.36, No.1, pp. 143–153, 1982.
38- A. Shamaly, G.S. Christensen and Y. Chen, Optimal Control of Two Interconnected Turbogenerators. Journal of Optimization Theory and Applications, Vol.40, No.2, 1983.
39- Y. Chen, G.S. Christensen and A. Shamaly, Realistic Feedback Control of Two Interconnected Turbogenerators. Journal of Optimization Theory and Applications, Vol.42, No.1, 1984.
40- M. Abdelhalim, G.S. Christensen and D.H. Kelly, Optimal Load Frequency Control with Governor Backlash. Journal of Optimization Theory and Applications, Vol.45, 1985.
41- M. Abdelhalim, G.S. Christensen and D.H. Kelly, Decentralized Optimum Load Frequency Control of Interconnected Power Systems. Journal of Optimization Theory and Applications, Vol.45, 1985
42- M.E. El-Hawary, R.S. Rao and G.S. Christensen, Optimal Hydro-Thermal Load Flow. Optimal Control Applications and Methods, Vol.7, pp. 18, 1986.
43- S.A. Soliman, G.S. Christensen and M. A. Abdelhalim, Optimal Operation of Multireservoir Power Systems Using Functional Analysis. Journal of Optimization Theory and Applications, Vol.49, No.3, pp. 449–461, 1986.
44- G.S. Christensen and S.A. Soliman, Long-Term Optimal Operation of a Parallel Multireservoir Power System Using Functional Analysis. Journal of Optimization Theory and Applications, Vol.50, No.3, pp. 383–395, 1986.
45- S.A. Soliman and G.S. Christensen, Modelling and Optimization of Series Reservoirs for Long-Term Regulation with Variable Head Using Functional Analysis. Journal of Optimization Theory and Applications, Vol.50, No.3, pp. 463–477, 1986.
46- S.A. Soliman and G.S. Christensen, Optimization of the Production of Hydroelectric Power Systems with a Variable Head. Journal of Optimization Theory and Applications, Vol.58, pp. 301–317. 1988.
47- S.A. Soliman and G.S. Christensen, Optimization of Reservoirs in Series on a River with a Nonlinear Storage Curve for Long-Term Regulation. Journal of Optimization Theory and Applications, Vol.58, pp. 109–126, 1988.
48- G.S. Christensen and S.A. Soliman, New Analytical Approach for Long-Term Optimal Operation of a Parallel Multireservoir Power System Based on Functional Analysis. Canadian Electrical Engineering Journal, Vol.11, No.3, pp. 118–127, 1986.
49- G.S. Christensen and S.A. Soliman, Optimal Long-Term Operation of a Multireservoir Power System for Critical Water Conditions Using Functional Analysis. Journal of Optimization Theory and Applications, Vol.53, No.3, pp. 377–393, 1987.
50- G.S. Christensen and S.A. Soliman, Modelling and Optimization of Parallel Reservoirs Having Nonlinear Storage Curves Under Critical Water Conditions for Long-Term Regulation Using Functional Analysis. Journal of Optimization Theory and Applications, Vol.55, No.3, pp. 359–376, 1987.
51- G.S. Christensen and S.A. Soliman, On the Application of Functional Analysis to the Optimization of the Production of Hydroelectric Power. IEEE Transactions P.W.R.S.-2-No.4, pp. 841–847, 1987.
52- S.A. Soliman and G.S. Christensen, Long-Term Optimal Operation of Series-Parallel Reservoirs for Critical Period with Specified Monthly Generation. Canadian Electrical Engineering Journal Vol.12, pp. 116–122, 1987.
53- S.A. Soliman and G.S. Christensen, Application of Functional Analysis to Optimization of a Variable Head Multireservoir Power System for Long-Term Regulation. Water Resources Research, Vol.22, No.6, pp. 852–858, 1986.
54- S.A. Soliman and G.S. Christensen, A New Approach for Optimizing Hydropower System Operation with a Quadratic Model. Lecture Notes in Control and Information Sciences, Vol.95 Oberwolfach, pp. 273–286, 1986.
55- S.A. Soliman and G.S. Christensen, A Minimum Norm Approach to Optimization of Production of Multireservoir Power Systems with Specified Monthly Generation. Journal of Optimization Theory and Applications, Vol.58, pp. 501–524, 1988.
56- S.A. Soliman and G.S. Christensen, Optimization of Hydropower Systems Operation with a Quadratic Model. Automatica, Vol.24, p. 249-256, 1988.
57- G.S. Christensen and S.A. Soliman, Optimal Discrete Long-Term Operation of Nuclear-Hydrothermal Power Systems. Journal of Optimization Theory and Applications, Vol.62, No.2, pp. 239–254. 1989.
58- S.A. Soliman, G.S. Christensen and A.H. Rouhi, A New Technique for Curve Fitting Based on Minimum Absolute Deviations. Computational Statistics and Data Analysis, Vol.6, pp. 341–351. 1989.
59- S.A. Soliman and G.S. Christensen, Parameter Estimation in Linear Static Systems Based on LAV Estimation. Journal of Optimization Theory and Applications, Vol.61, No.2, pp. 281–294. 1989.
60- G.S. Christensen and S.A. Soliman, A New Technique for Linear Static State Estimation Based on LAV Approximations. Journal of Optimization Theory and Applications, Vol.61, No.1, pp. 123–136. 1989.
61- G.S. Christensen and S.A. Soliman, Long-Term Optimal Operation of Series-Parallel Reservoirs for Critical Period with Specified Monthly Generation and Average Monthly Storage. Journal of Optimization Theory and Applications, Vol.63, No.3. 1989.
62- G.S. Christensen, S.A. Soliman and A.H. Rouhi, A New Technique for Unconstrained and Constrained Linear LAV Parameter Estimation. Canadian Electrical Engineering Journal, Vol.14, pp. 14–30. 1989.
63- S.A. Soliman, S.E.A. Emam and G.S. Christensen, A New Algorithm for Parameter Estimation of Synchronous Machine from Frequency Test Based on LAV Approximation. Canadian Electrical and Computer Engineering Journal, Vol.14, No.3, pp. 98–102. 1989.
64- S.A. Soliman, S.E.A. Emam and G.S. Christensen, Optimization on Site and Control Setting of Shunt Capacitors on Distribution Feeders. Journal of Optimization Theory and Control, Vol.65, No.2. May1990.
65- S.A. Soliman, S.E.A. Emam and G.S. Christensen, A New Approach for the Identification of Power System Economic Dispatch Parameters. Journal of Optimization Theory and Applications, Vol.65, No.1. April 1990.
66- G.S. Christensen and S.A. Soliman, Optimal Filtering for Continuous Linear Dynamic Systems Based on WLAV Approximations. Automatica, Vol.26, No.2, pp. 399–400. 1990.
67- G.S. Christensen and S.A. Soliman, Optimal Filtering of Linear, Discrete Dynamic Systems Based on WLAV Approximations. Automatica, Vol.26, No.2, pp. 389–395. 1990.
68- G.S. Christensen, S.A. Soliman and A. Rouhi, Discussion of "An example showing that a new technique for LAV estimation breaks down in certain cases". Computational Statistics and Data Analysis, Vol.9, pp. 203–213. 1990.
69- G.S. Christensen, S.A. Soliman and A. Atallah, Optimal Scheduling of Multichain Hydro Power Systems, Long Term Study. Canadian Journal of Electrical and Computer Engineering, Vol.14, No.4, pp. 152–156.1989.
70- G.S. Christensen, S.A. Soliman and A.H. Rouhi, An Observability Algorithm for Sequential Measurement Processing in Power System State Estimation. Electric Machines and Power Systems, Vol.17, pp. 203–219. 1989.
71- S.A. Soliman and G.S. Christensen, A New Algorithm for Optimal Parameter Estimation. Journal of Optimization Theory and Applications, Vol.66, No.3. September 1990.
72- S.A. Soliman, G.S. Christensen and S.S. Fouda, On the Application of the Least Absolute Value (LAV) Parameter Estimation Algorithm to Distance Relaying. Electric Power Systems Research, Vol.19, pp. 23–35. 1990.
73- S.A. Soliman, G.S. Christensen, D.H. Kelly and N. Liu, An Algorithm for Frequency Relaying Based on Least Absolute Value Approximations. Electric Power Systems Research, Vol.19, pp. 73–84. 1990.
74- S.A. Soliman, G.S. Christensen and D.H. Kelly, A State Estimation Algorithm for Power Systems Harmonics Identification and Measurements. Electric Power Systems Research, Vol.19, No.2, pp. 195–206. 1990.
75- S.A. Soliman, S.E.A Emam and G.S. Christensen, Application of Optimization to the Size and Control Settings of Shunt Capacitors on Distribution Feeders. Electric Machines and Power Systems, Vol.18, pp. 41–51, 1990.
76- S.A. Soliman, S.E.A. Emam and G.S. Christensen, Optimal Coefficients Estimation of Non-Monotonically Increasing Incremental Cost Curves. Electric Power Systems Research, Accepted September 10, 1990. Manuscript pages: 20.
77- G.S. Christensen and S.A. Soliman, Least Absolute Value Estimation of the Generalized Operational Impedances of Solid-Rotor Synchronous Machines from SSFR Test Data. Electric Power Systems Research, Accepted September 7, 1990. Manuscript pages:24.
78- S.A. Soliman, G.S. Christensen and A.H. Rouhi, A New Algorithm for Nonlinear L1-Norm Minimization with Nonlinear Equality Constraints. Computational Statistics and Data Analysis, Vol.11, pp. 1–13. 1990.
79- G.S. Christensen, S.A. Soliman and A. M. Atallah, Efficient Load Following Schedule with Application to the B.P.A. Hydro-Electric System. International Journal of Electrical Power and Energy Systems, Vol.13, Feb. 1991, pp. 45–50.
80- G.S. Christensen, S.A. Soliman and A.M. Atallah, Optimal Long-Term Operation of the B.P.A. Hydro-Electric Power System. International Journal of Computer Systems Science and Engineering, Accepted Vol.13, No.1 Feb. 1991 pp. 38–42.
81- S.A. Soliman and G.S. Christensen, Estimating of Steady State Voltage and Frequency of Power Systems from Digitized Bus Voltage Samples. Electric Machines and Power Systems, Vol.19 1991, pp. 555–576.
82- S.A. Soliman and G.S. Christensen, Power Systems Digital Voltmeters with Low Sensitivity to Frequency Change. Electric Machines and Power Systems Journal, accepted July 5, 1991, Man. 20.
83- G.S. Christensen, S.A. Soliman, D.H. Kelly and K.M. El-Naggar. Identification and Measurements of Power System Harmonics Using Disacrete Fourier Transform (DFT). Electric Machines and Power Systems, accepted July 5, 1991, Man. 29.
84- S.A. Soliman and G.S. Christensen, Digital Analysis of Power Systems Dynamic Oscillation Using a Curve Fitting Technique. Electric Machines and Power Systems, Vol.20 1992 pp. 309–320.
85- S.A. Soliman and G.S. Christensen, Modelling of Induction Motors from Standstill Frequency Response Tests and a Parameter Estimation Algorithm. Electric Machines and Power Systems, Vol.20, 1992 pp. 123–126.
86- S.A. Soliman, G.S. Christensen and A.H. Rouhi, Power System State Estimation with Equality Constraints. Electric Machines and Power Systems, Vol.20 1992, pp. 183–202.
87- S.A. Soliman, G.S. Christensen, D.H. Kelly and K.M. El-Naggar, Least Absolute Value based linear Programming Algorithm for Measurement of Power System Frequency from a distorted Bus Voltage Signal. Electric Machines and Power Systems, Vol.20 1992, pp. 549–568.
88- S.A. Soliman, G.S. Christensen, D.H. Kelly and K.M. El-Naggar, Dynamic Tracking of the Steady State Power System Voltage Magnitude and Frequency using Linear Kalman Filter: a Variable Frequency Model. Electric Machines and Power Systems, Vol.20, 1992 pp. 593–611.
89- S.A. Soliman, G.S. Christensen and K.M. El-Naggar, A Digital Measurement of Earth Fault Loop-Impedance Using a Parameter Estimation Algorithm. Electric Machines and Power Systems, Vol.20 1992, pp. 613–621.
90- S.A. Soliman, G.S. Christensen and K.M. El-Naggar, A new Approximate Least Absolute Value based Dynamic Filtering Algorithm for on-line Power System Frequency. Electric Machines and Power Systems, Vol.20 1992, pp. 569–592.
91- G.S. Christensen and S.A. Soliman, Optimization Techniques in Hydro-Electric Systems. Zentralblatt fuer Mathematik, Accepted Jan. 10, 1992, Man. 1.
92- G.S. Christensen, Mehrdad Saif, and S.A. Soliman. A New Algorithm for Finding the Optimal Solution of the Least Absolute Value Estimation Problem. Canadian Journal of Electrical and Computer Engineering, Vol. 32, No. 1, pp. 5–8, Winter 2007.
93- G.S. Christensen and Mehrdad Saif. The Asymptotic Stability of Nonlinear Autonomous Systems. Canadian Journal of Electrical and Computer Engineering, Vol. 32, No. 1, pp. 35–43, Winter 2007.
