= Rodén =

Coordinates: 41°29′N 0°39′W

- Village
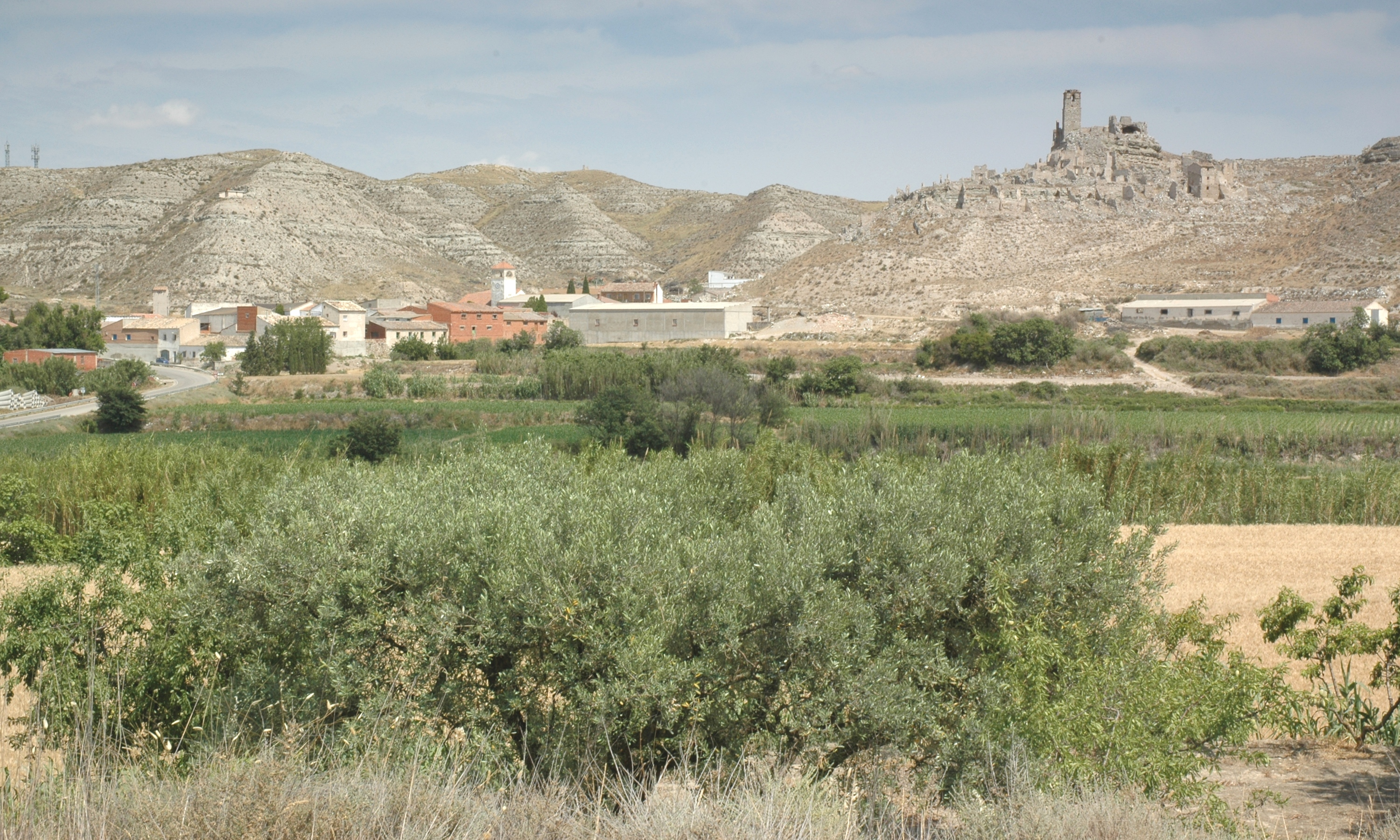
- New (left) and old (right) villages of Rodén
- Interactive map of Rodén
- Country: Spain
- Autonomous community: Aragon
- Province: Zaragoza
- Municipality: Fuentes de Ebro
- Elevation: 287 m (942 ft)
- Time zone: UTC+1 (CET)
  - Summer (DST): UTC+2 (CEST)

Rodén is a village in the Fuentes de Ebro municipality in the province of Zaragoza, Aragon, Spain. Rodén is about 3 kilometres (1.9 mi) south-west of Fuentes de Ebro on the CV-209 road.

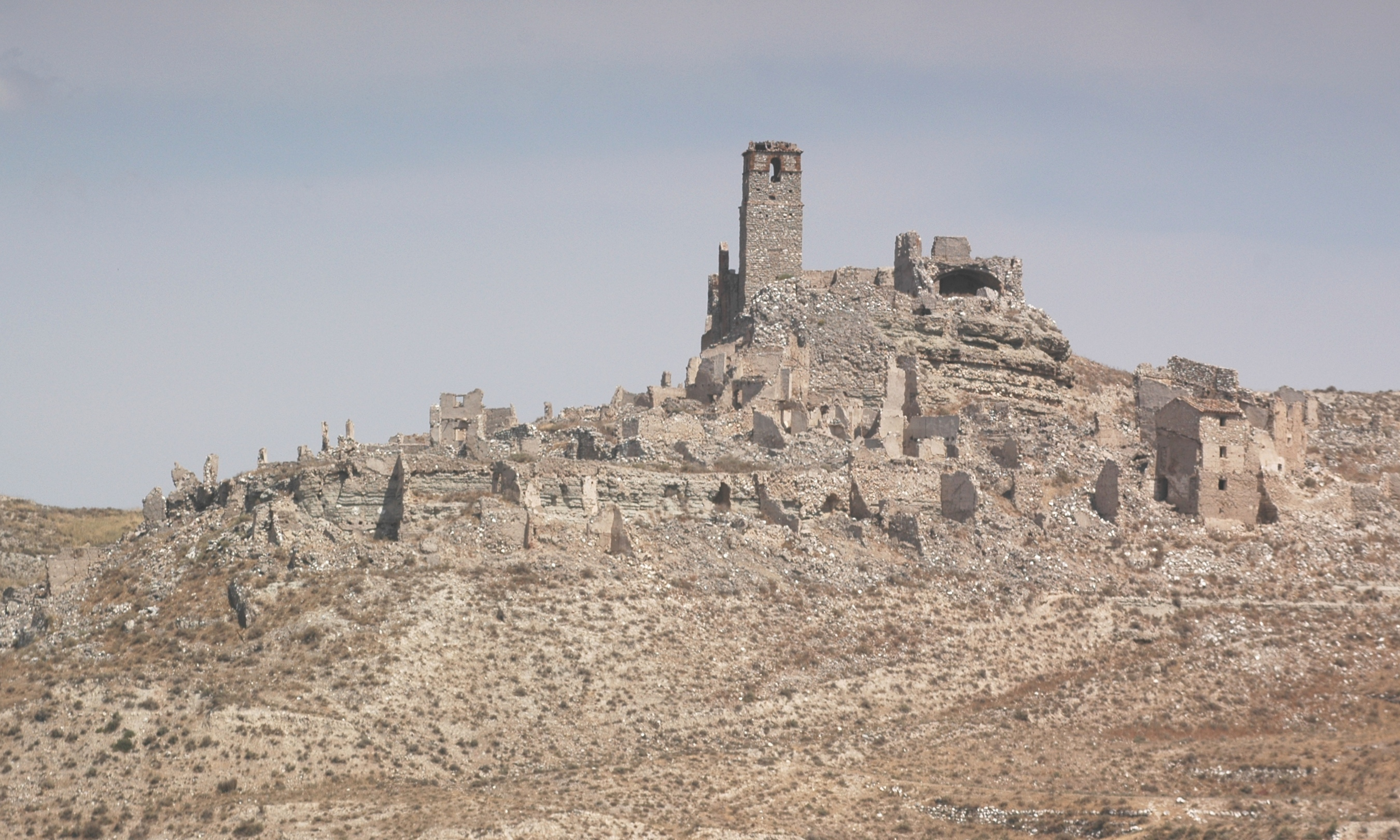
Ruins of the old village of Rodén

The old village is on a hilltop and was abandoned as a result of the Spanish Civil War. The old village also Islam-influenced architecture. The new village is at the foot of the hill. The ruins of the old village have been preserved.
