= Irving Getz =

American jeweler and business executive

- Born: August 6, 1923; Cincinnati, Ohio, U.S.
- Died: May 27, 2008 (aged 84); Miami, Florida, U.S.
- Education: University of Florida
- Occupations: Jeweler, business executive
- Known for: Mayor's Jewelers
- Spouse: Joan Brick Getz
- Children: 4

Irving Getz (August 6, 1923 – May 27, 2008) was an American jeweler and business executive who led Mayor's Jewelers, the family-owned jewelry business founded by his father. Getz took over the business in 1947 and expanded it into a chain of fine-jewelry stores in Florida.

Getz served as president of Jewelers of America and on the board of the Jewelers Vigilance Committee. In 1989, he became one of the first three inductees into National Jeweler's Retailer Hall of Fame.

== Early life ==
Getz was born on August 6, 1923, in Cincinnati, Ohio. He was the son of Samuel and Elsie Getz. His father was a jeweler who moved the family and the business to Florida, opening a jewelry store in downtown Miami.

Getz moved to Miami with his family when he was fourteen. He attended Georgia Military Academy in Atlanta and later attended the University of Florida.

During World War II, Getz served in the United States Army. He attended Officer Candidate School at Fort Benning, Georgia, became a second lieutenant and served in Germany.

== Career ==
After returning to Miami following World War II, Getz began working at his father's jewelry store, Mayor's Jewelers. He took over the business in 1947.

Under Getz, Mayor's expanded beyond its downtown Miami location into a regional chain of fine-jewelry stores. The company began opening additional locations in shopping malls during the 1960s.

By 1970, Getz was president of Mayor's Jewelers. That year, the company expanded at Dadeland Mall, where Mayor's was one of the mall's established retailers.

By the mid-1980s, Mayor's operated a chain of stores throughout Florida. In 1985, Mayor's was a Florida retail jewelry chain with eleven stores in South Florida and Getz was its president. Getz's son Samuel A. Getz joined Mayor's full-time in 1980 and later succeeded his father in the management of the company.

== Jewelry industry activities ==
In addition to his work at Mayor's, Getz held leadership positions in the American jewelry industry. He served as president of Jewelers of America, was a board member of the Jewelers Vigilance Committee, and was a member of the New York Diamond Dealers Club.

In 1989, National Jeweler established its Retailer Hall of Fame to recognize jewelers who had made significant contributions to jewelry retailing. Getz was selected as the inaugural honoree in the Multi-Store Independent category, alongside Harold Tivol in the Single-Store Independent category and Robert Bridge of Ben Bridge Jewelers in the Majors category.

== Personal life ==
Getz married Joan Brick in March 1951. They had four children.

Outside the jewelry business, Getz was a competitive skeet shooter and won state, regional and world championships. He was also involved in cycling, fly fishing, skiing and marathon running.

== Death and legacy ==
Getz died in Miami on May 27, 2008, at the age of 84.

Following his death, his family established the Irving Getz Scholarship through the Gemological Institute of America (GIA) in recognition of his contributions to the jewelry industry. The scholarship was established for students taking GIA courses and programs.
