= James Rodden =

American attorney

James Joseph Rodden
- Education: Pennsylvania State University; Wake Forest University School of Law
- Organization: Immigration and Customs Enforcement

James Joseph Rodden is an American attorney, serving as an Immigration and Customs Enforcement (ICE) assistant chief counsel based in Dallas, Texas.

== Career ==
Rodden is a member of the District of Columbia Bar. In 2021, Rodden was the named plaintiff in James Joseph Rodden, et al. v. Dr. Anthony Fauci, a class action lawsuit filed by federal employees challenging the government's federal employee COVID-19 vaccine mandate.

In February 2025, The Texas Observer identified Rodden as the operator of a social media account "GlomarResponder" espousing white supremacist ideology. The investigation showed that on January 24, 2025, Rodden's Twitter account posted "America is a White nation, founded by Whites. We are the historical and majority population, and it was founded for our benefit. Our country should favor us." Following the story's publication, Rodden was removed from federal immigration schedules and three members of Congress sent letters to the US Department of Homeland Security and ICE demanding an investigation into Rodden. ICE subsequently acknowledged "recent media reports alleging an ICE employee operated a white supremacist social-media account" in a response to a letter from Congressman Marc Veasey. On January 13, 2026, the Texas Observer reported that Rodden had returned to serving at an immigration court in Dallas. The Southern Poverty Law Center subsequently characterized Rodden's tweets as "Anti-Immigrant activity" in a report titled March 2025 Trends, Rhetoric and Incidents of the Hard Right. In a July 17, 2025, opinion piece for The Hill, former ICE prosecutor Veronica Cardenas wrote that "When defenders of the Constitution resign and those like Rodden stay behind, loyalty to equal justice is replaced by loyalty to power. For the sake of our nation, we must do better. We must demand a system where immigration courtrooms are guided by principle."

Following Rodden's return to immigration court in January 2026, Congressman Marc Veasey stated, "White supremacists should not hold positions of authority in our justice system, and I will do everything in my power to ensure that Rodden is held accountable." That month, Veasey proposed an amendment to a Department of Homeland Security funding bill that would reduce Rodden's salary to one dollar.
