= Roden Brothers =

Canadian tableware manufacturing company

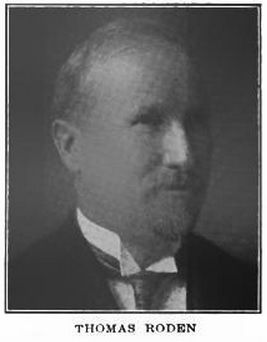
Thomas Roden in 1922, founder of Roden Bros. Ltd.

Roden Brothers was a Canadian tableware design and manufacturing company. It was founded on June 1, 1891 in Toronto by Thomas and Frank Roden. In the 1910s the firm became known as Roden Bros. Ltd. and were later taken over by Henry Birks and Sons in 1953. Roden Bros Ltd.'s silver was supplied by the province of British Columbia and with it they produced a wide range of silver holloware and flatware in traditional English styles. The company offered a variety of flatware patterns that included Stratford, Queens, and Louis XV. Goldsmiths Stock Company were their exclusive selling agents from 1900 to 1922.

Roden Bros Ltd.'s mark included the word Sterling, followed by 925, an R and a lion passant. In addition to silver hollowware and flatware, Roden Bros. Ltd. produced cut crystal and medals. In 1974 Roden Bros. Ltd. published the book, Rich Cut Glass with Clock House Publications in Peterborough, Ontario, which was a reprint of the 1917 edition published by Roden Bros., Toronto.

A few unique items that Roden Bros. Ltd. produced were a gold rose bowl with the royal route across Canada engraved on it for King George VI and Queen Elizabeth in 1939, a tea service for Princess Elizabeth's wedding in 1947, and they were attributed to helping with the production of the Stanley and Grey Cup.
