= Henry Birks =

Canadian businessman (1840–1928)

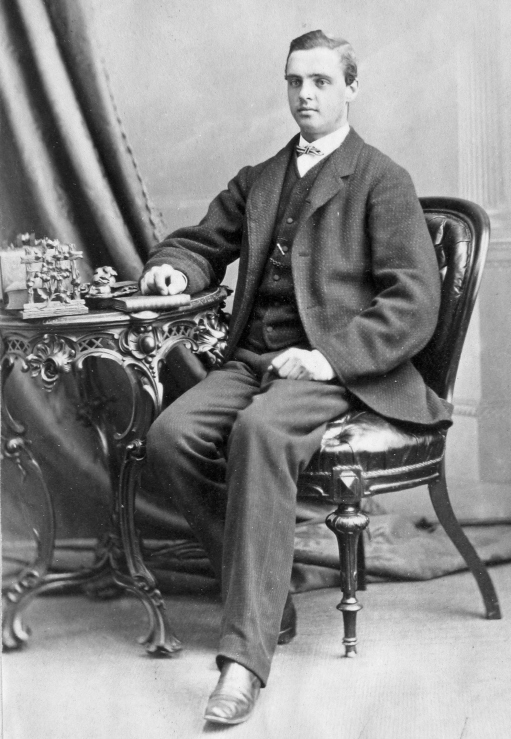
- Henry Birks in 1866
- Born: 30 November 1840; Montreal, Lower Canada
- Died: 16 April 1928 (aged 87); Montreal, Quebec
- Resting place: Mount Royal Cemetery
- Occupations: Jeweller, Businessperson
- Known for: Founder of Henry Birks and Sons, a chain of jewellery stores in Canada

Henry Birks (30 November 1840 – 16 April 1928) was a Canadian businessman and founder of Henry Birks and Sons, a chain of high-end Canadian jewellery stores.

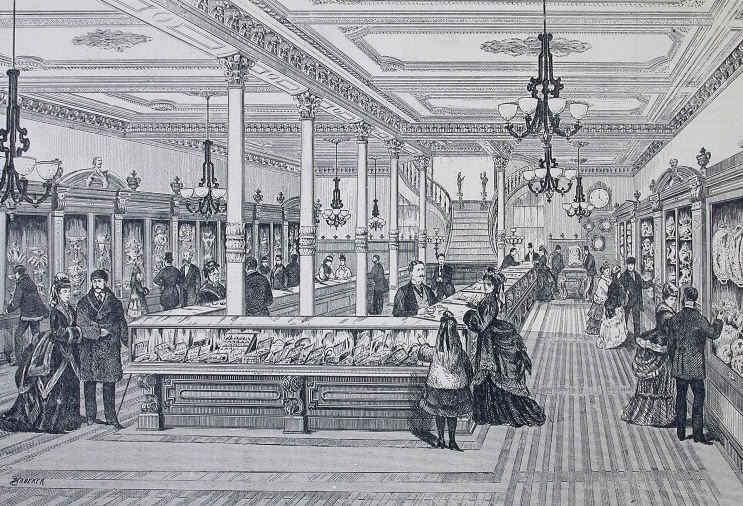
The Savage and Lyman store on St. James Street, 1875

He was born to English immigrants from Yorkshire, England. His parents moved to Canada in 1832. Son of John Birks, a pharmacist, and Anne Massey, he did his schooling in commercial studies at the High School of Montreal.

In 1857, Birks was hired as a clerk at Savage and Lyman in Montreal, reputed to be the finest jeweller and watchmaker in the Province of Canada at that time. Although Birks eventually became a partner in the firm in 1868, the company's later financial difficulties encouraged Birks to leave in 1877.

With an investment of C$3000, Birks opened his own small jewellery shop in 1879 on Saint James Street in the heart of Montreal's financial and commercial district. In 1893, Birks went into partnership with his three sons (William, John and Gerald), and the name of the firm became Henry Birks and Sons. As the focus of Montreal's commercial centre moved north towards Saint Catherine Street, the Birks store moved to new premises on Phillips Square in 1894, where the company still maintains a store and corporate offices. Commencing in 1901, Birks oversaw the expansion of the company across the country, with stores opening in Canada's largest cities.

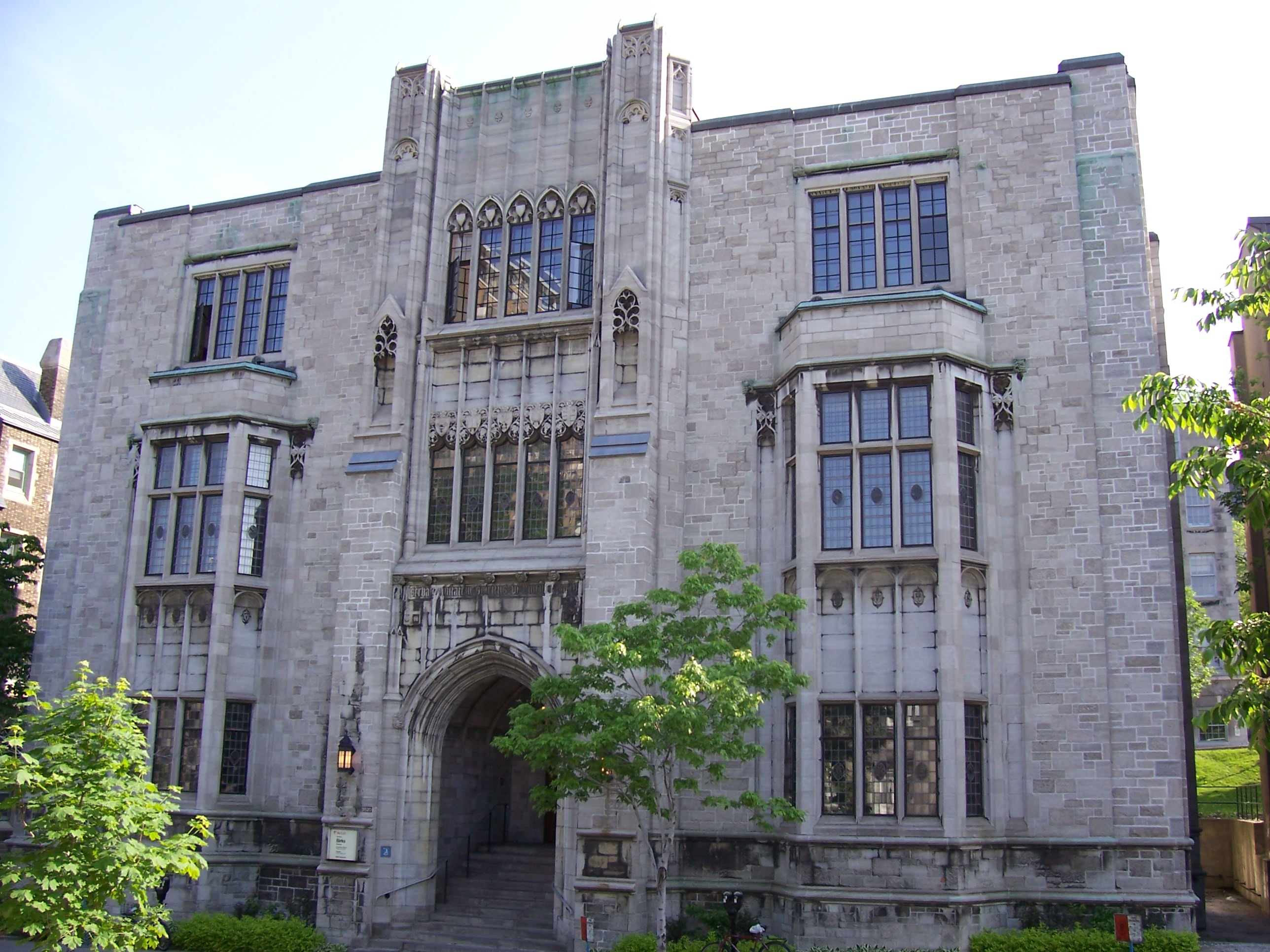
The William and Henry Birks Building, McGill University, Montreal, Quebec, Canada

Henry Birks served as a prototype to many Canadian entrepreneurs of the 19th century. The son of English immigrants, his education was focused primarily on commerce, and he subsequently put it into practice by working in a large and successful firm. As soon as the circumstances would permit, he started his own company, which prospered and ultimately became a Canada-wide commercial empire.

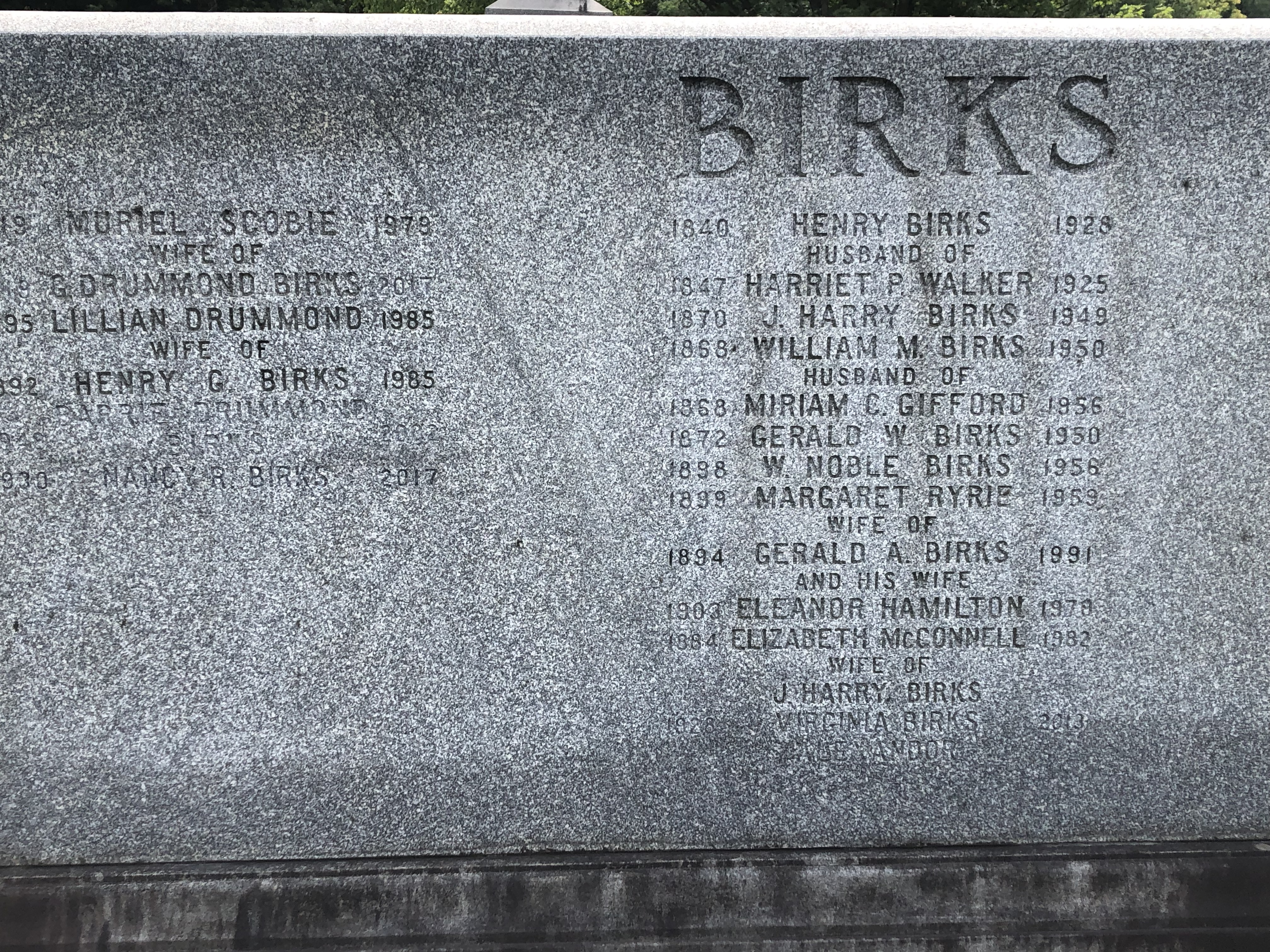
Detail of Henri Birks' funeral monument in Mount Royal Cemetery, Montreal.

Five successive generations of the Birks family have been involved in Henry Birks and Sons since its founding in 1879. One of Birks' sons, Gerald Birks, proposed an educational system for Canadian soldiers known as the Khaki University, which was ultimately implemented for all soldiers in 1917.

The William and Henry Birks Building at Montreal's McGill University, a Collegiate Gothic structure on University Street, is named in honour of Birks and one of his sons.
