= Jewelers of America =

- Abbreviation: JA
- Formation: 1906
- Purpose: Advance the professionalism and ethics of the jewelry industry.
- Headquarters: 120 Broadway, Suite 2820; New York, New York
- Website: www.jewelers.org

The Jewelers of America (JA) is a trade association of professionals in the United States jewelry industry. The organization was formed in 1906. Jewelers of America produces a Code of Professional Practices for use by those in the industry. The association also provides information to help consumers learn about jewelry.

In 2009, the Jewelers of America formed a strategic alliance with Jewelers Mutual Insurance Company to enhance services to the industry.

== National Jeweler ==
In January 2015, Jewelers of America acquired the magazine, National Jeweler, from Emerald Expositions. National Jeweler was founded in 1906.
