= American transportation in the Siegfried Line campaign =

American logistics in Europe in World War II

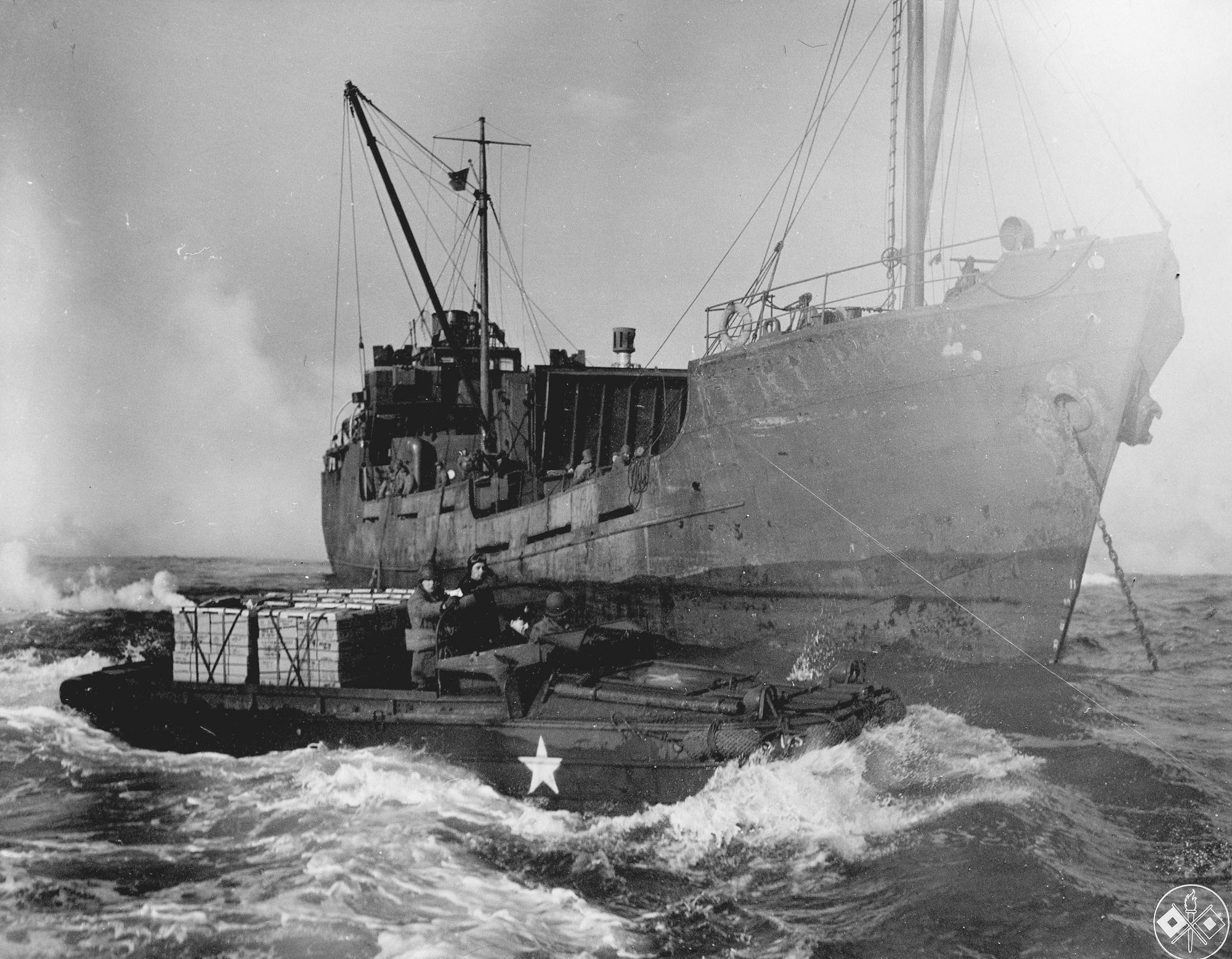
A merchant ship unloads supplies into a DUKW.

American transportation played a crucial part in the military logistics of the World War II Siegfried Line campaign, which ran from the end of the expulsion of the German armies from Normandy in mid-September 1944 until December 1944, when the American Army was engulfed by the German Ardennes offensive. In August 1944, the Supreme Allied Commander, General Dwight D. Eisenhower, elected to continue the pursuit of the retreating German forces beyond the Seine instead of pausing to build up supplies and establish the lines of communication as called for in the original Operation Overlord plan. The subsequent advance to the German border stretched the American logistical system to its breaking point, and the advance came to a halt in mid-September.

The Germans attempted to delay the Allied advance until the onset of bad weather by denying access to ports and demolishing communications infrastructure in order to give their own forces time to recover. Between September and November, the American forces in Europe suffered from severe transportation problems. In September, Cherbourg was the only deep-water port in northwest Europe in Allied hands capable of handling Liberty ships, but it had been badly damaged, and took a long time to restore. Smaller ports could handle only small, shallow-draft coastal trading vessels known as "coasters". Two-thirds of the British coaster fleet, on which critical industries depended, was dedicated to the campaign. Over time, rough seas, enemy action and continuous use laid up a quarter of the coaster fleet for repairs. From September onwards, an increasing volume of supplies came directly from the United States. These were stowed in Liberty ships so as to make optimal use of their cargo space. The shipments frequently included heavy and bulky items that required dockside cranes to unload. The available port capacity was insufficient to unload the ships arriving. As the number of ships awaiting discharge in European waters climbed, turnaround times increased, and fewer ships reported back to port in the United States, precipitating a widespread shipping crisis.

Additional port capacity was obtained through the opening of Rouen and Le Havre in September and October respectively, and of Antwerp in November. Antwerp was capable of handling all the Allies' needs, but before the war it had been a transit port, and did not possess large amounts of covered storage space. The Americans were allocated only a small amount of this, all uncovered, on the assumption that American supplies would immediately be moved to the depots around Liège. The limiting factor then shifted to port clearance. Initially, motor transport was widely used, but as the railways were brought back into service, they shouldered the burden of moving supplies from the ports to the depots. Inland water transport was developed to relieve pressure on the railways. Four waterways were rehabilitated for military use: the Seine, Oise and Rhône rivers, and the Albert Canal. Air transport was the least economic form of transport, but in September and October, with road and rail transport unable to supply even the minimum daily requirements of the armies, it was called upon to supplement them.

Although logistical difficulties constituted a brake on combat operations, they were not the only factors that brought the Allied advance to a halt. The American forces also had to contend with rugged terrain, worsening weather and, above all, with stubborn German resistance. The German recovery was sufficient to mount the Ardennes offensive in December. This threatened Antwerp and the depot areas around Liège, which also came under attack from German V-weapons and air raids. This placed immense strain on the American communications, but by the new year the American transportation system was more robust than ever, and preparations were under way to support the final assault on Germany.

== Background ==
In the first seven weeks after the commencement of Operation Overlord, the Allied invasion of Normandy on D-Day (6 June 1944), determined German opposition exploited the defensive value of the Normandy bocage country against American forces. At first, the Allied advance was slower than the Operation Overlord plan had anticipated. The American Operation Cobra, which commenced on 25 July, effected a turnaround in the operational situation by achieving a breakout from the Normandy lodgment area. The Germans were outmaneuvered and driven into a chaotic retreat. The 12th Army Group became active on 1 August, under the command of Lieutenant General Omar N. Bradley. It initially consisted of the First Army, commanded by Lieutenant General Courtney Hodges, and the Third Army, under Lieutenant General George S. Patton Jr. The Ninth Army, under Lieutenant General William H. Simpson, joined the 12th Army Group on 5 September.

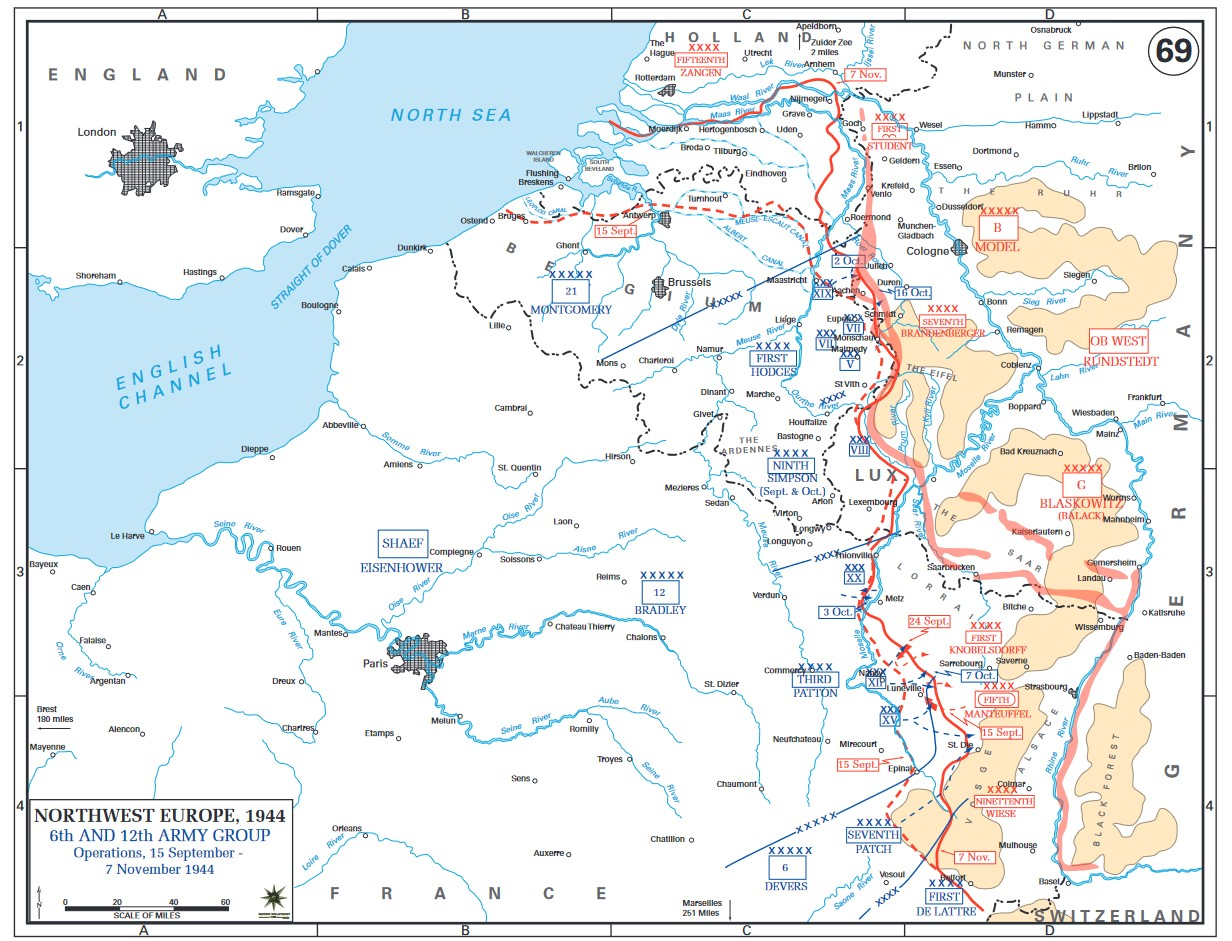
US operations, 15 September to 7 November 1944. Allies in blue; Germans in red. Formations are designated with standard military symbology.

British General Sir Bernard Montgomery, the commander of the British 21st Army Group, remained in command of all ground forces, British and American, until 1 September, when the Supreme Allied Commander, General Dwight D. Eisenhower, opened his Supreme Headquarters, Allied Expeditionary Force (SHAEF) in France, and assumed direct command of the ground forces. This brought not just the 12th and 21st Army Groups under Eisenhower's direct command, but also Lieutenant General John C. H. Lee's Communications Zone (COMZ), which became operational on the continent on 7 August.

Bradley had previously exercised control over the Advance Section (ADSEC) of COMZ as the senior American commander on the continent. As such, he had prescribed stock levels in the depots and priorities for the delivery of supplies, and apportioned service units between the armies and the Communications Zone. Bradley believed that as the senior operational commander he should exercise such authority, as was the case in the British forces. Under the American organization, COMZ headquarters also functioned as the headquarters of the European Theater of Operations, United States Army (ETOUSA).

The Allied commanders pushed their forces to the limits logistically to take advantage of the chaotic German retreat. By 3 August Patton's Third Army was advancing into Brittany. Bradley ordered Patton to turn east, leaving only minimal forces behind. This decision entailed grave risk, for under the Operation Overlord plan, the ports of Lorient and Quiberon Bay were to be developed for the logistical support of the American forces under the codename Operation Chastity. This was the first in a series of critical decisions that subordinated logistical considerations to short-term operational advantage.

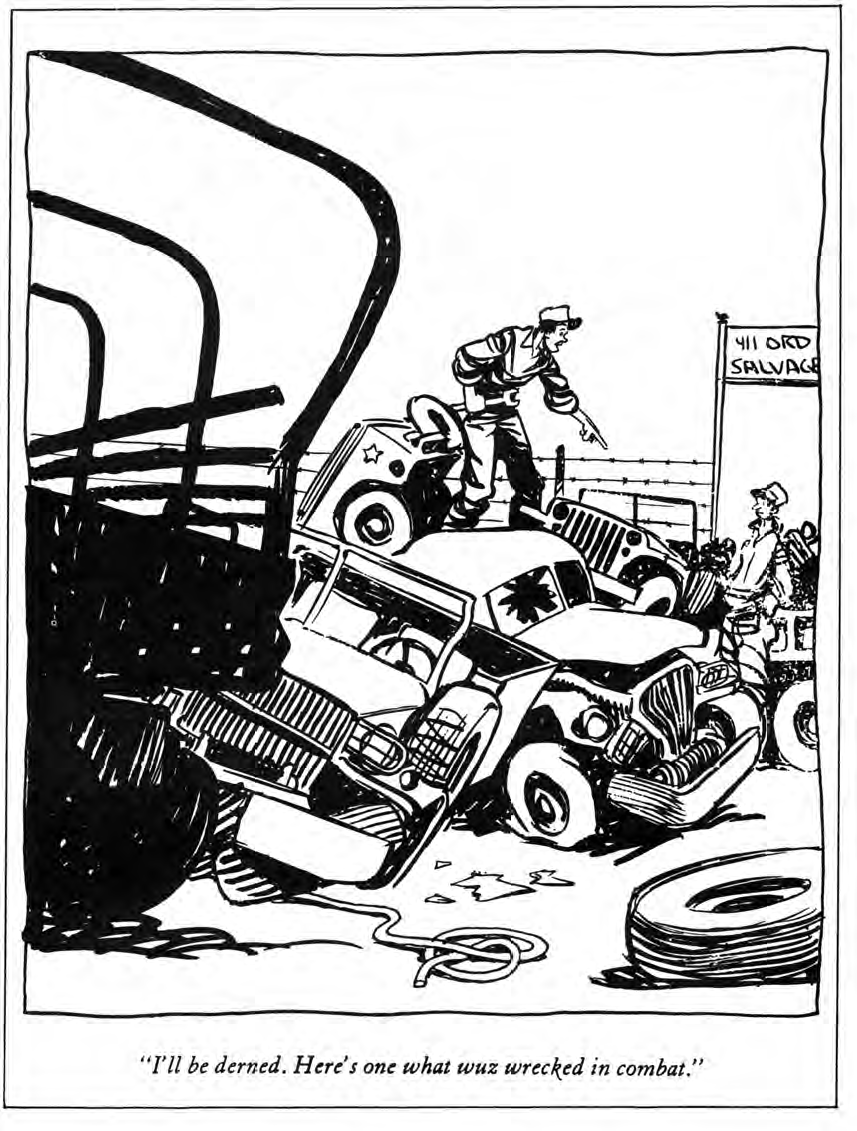
Stars and Stripes cartoon by Bill Mauldin

In mid-August, Eisenhower decided to continue the pursuit of the retreating German forces beyond the Seine. This stretched the logistical system. Between 25 August and 12 September the Allied armies advanced from the D plus 90 phase line, the position the Operation Overlord plan expected to be reached 90 days after D-Day, to the D plus 350 phase line, moving through 260 phase lines in just 19 days. Although the planners had estimated that no more than twelve divisions could be maintained beyond the Seine, by September sixteen were, albeit on reduced scales of rations and supplies. Logistical forecasts were repeatedly shown to be overly pessimistic, imbuing a sense of confidence that difficulties could be overcome.

The advance came to a halt in September. This was not a result of inadequate supplies or port capacity – there were still some 600,000 long tons (610,000 t) of supplies stockpiled in the Normandy lodgment area in November – nor solely by a shortage of fuel. Rather, the problem was the inability to deliver fuel and supplies to the armies. Railways could not be repaired and pipelines could not be constructed quickly enough.

Motor transport was used as a stopgap, but there was a shortage of suitable vehicles. There was political interference by the Truman Committee, which considered the production of heavy-duty vehicles to be wasteful and unnecessarily reducing the number of civilian vehicles that could be built, and production difficulties arising from a shortage of forgings and castings for heavy-duty axles, engines and transmissions. The insufficient numbers of heavy trucks compelled the Army to use the smaller general purpose 2½-ton 6×6 trucks for long hauls, for which they were unsuited. Overloading, overuse, accidents and poor maintenance practices took their toll. The pursuit resulted in large quantities of equipment being damaged, worn out, and written off. In November, SHAEF reported to the War Department that each month 375 medium and 125 light tanks, 900 2½-ton trucks, 1,500 jeeps, 700 mortars and 100 artillery pieces had been written off. Tank losses in August and September respectively had been 25.3 percent and 16.5 percent of establishment, and the reserves were exhausted. More than 15,000 vehicles were unserviceable, awaiting repairs or parts. While the American soldier was reputed to have more mechanical aptitude and experience than any other soldiers in the world, this was seldom on display. A Bill Mauldin cartoon depicted a mechanic standing atop a pile of wrecked vehicles and commenting: "I'll be derned. Here's one what wuz wrecked in combat."

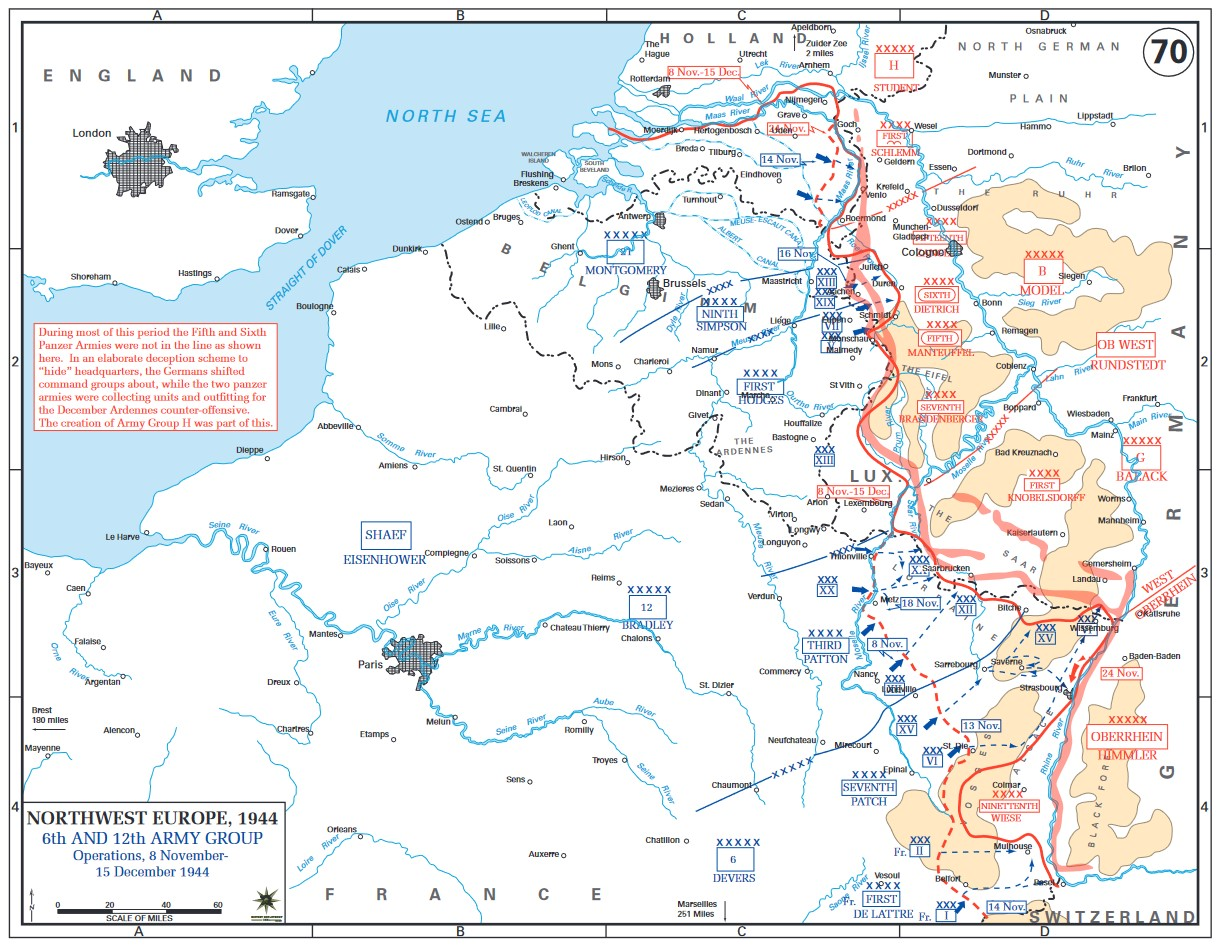
US operations, 8 November to 15 December 1944. Allies in blue; Germans in red. Formations are designated with standard military symbology.

Failure to follow proper procedures contributed to the waste and disorder. Dumps established by the armies were frequently turned over to COMZ with little or no paperwork, so supplies were unrecorded, unidentified and unlocatable, resulting in duplicate requisitions. This was exacerbated by the dispatch of filler cargoes of unwanted goods shipped solely to make maximum use of the available transport. The indenting system itself was imperfect and slow in responding to urgent demands. Logisticians at all levels strove to improvise, adapt and overcome difficulties, with considerable success, but short-term solutions frequently created longer-term problems. Hoarding, bartering, over-requisitioning, and cannibalizing vehicles for spare parts degraded the effectiveness of the supply system.

The German strategy was to conduct a fighting withdrawal to the Siegfried Line (which they called the Westwall) while holding the ports as long as possible and conducting a scorched earth program to deny or destroy as much of the transportation infrastructure as possible. The hope was that these measures would restrict the Allies' operational capabilities, which relied heavily on logistical support, and thereby gain sufficient time to reconstitute the German forces. If six to eight weeks could be gained, then bad autumn weather would set in, further restricting the Allies' mobility, air operations and logistical support, and the German forces might be able to take the offensive again.

== Shipping ==
Under the Operation Overlord plan US forces would be supported over the Omaha and Utah landing beaches, an artificial Mulberry harbor, and the ports of Cherbourg in Normandy and Saint-Malo and Quiberon Bay in Brittany. This was considered insufficient, and the planners (correctly) forecast a port capacity shortfall by D plus 120, when autumn weather would hamper beach operations. The American Mulberry was abandoned after it was damaged in a storm in June, and the delay in capturing and opening Cherbourg meant that Cherbourg, the beaches and the minor ports had to handle far more daily tonnage than originally planned. There was another storm on 1 August, and rain, fog and heavy seas intermittently hampered beach operations in August and September. Weather was not the only problem: the road transport needed for beach clearance had been run constantly since June and increasing numbers of vehicles were worn out and in need of repair. In October weather conditions were consistently bad and discharges averaged 6,243 long tons (6,343 t) per day. The Utah and Omaha beaches were closed for good on 13 and 19 November respectively.

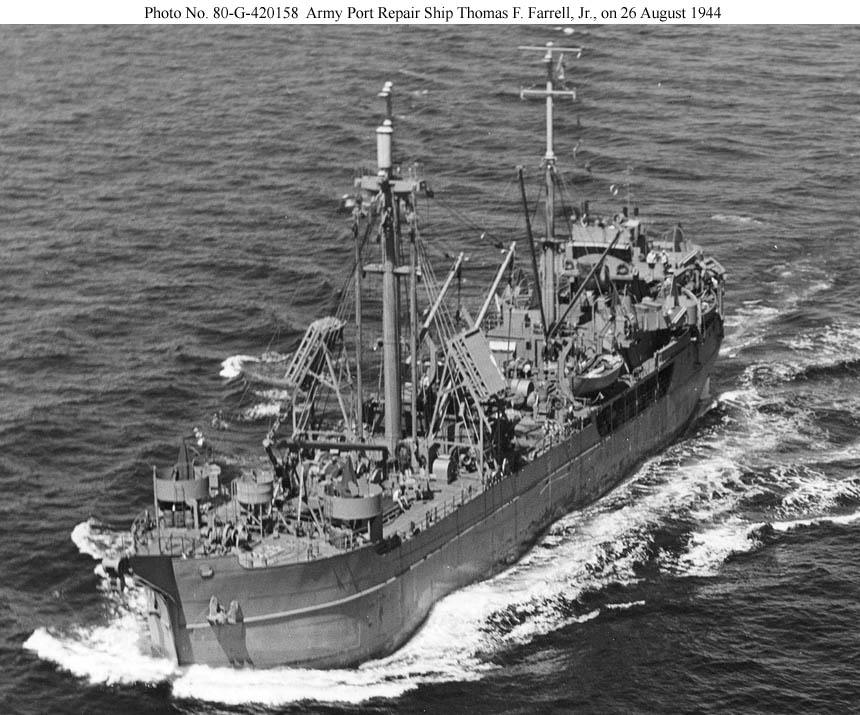
USAPRS Thomas F. Farrell Jr., a Baltic coaster converted to an engineer port repair ship

On 11 July Cherbourg's target was raised from 8,500 to 20,000 long tons (8,600 to 20,300 t) per day by the end of September, but this could not be met. Delays in removing mines and underwater obstacles caused the rehabilitation of the port to fall far behind schedule, and discharges actually fell during September because the port had to handle troop movements with their organizational equipment, which had originally been planned to land at Brest. SHAEF decided on 7 September that Nantes, Saint-Nazaire, Lorient and Quiberon Bay would not be developed, and by the time the Battle for Brest ended on 25 September, the port was so badly damaged that plans to use it were shelved indefinitely.

The Overlord planners had identified a need for shallow-draft vessels, and the Combined Chiefs of Staff had allocated 625,000 deadweight tons (635,000 deadweight tonnes) of coasters for the first six weeks of the operation. This represented about two-thirds of the British coaster fleet, on which critical industries depended for the transport of iron, coal and other commodities. The allocation of so much coastal shipping to Overlord entailed temporarily shutting down a quarter of the UK's blast furnaces. The British therefore wanted the shipping returned as soon as possible. It was planned that after the first six weeks, the allocation to Overlord would be reduced to 250,000 deadweight tons (254,000 deadweight tonnes).

Under the circumstances, the coasters could not be released. Some 560,000 deadweight tons (570,000 deadweight tonnes) of coasters were still engaged in the cross-Channel run in September, and this actually rose to over 600,000 deadweight tons (610,000 deadweight tonnes) in November. The crux of the problem was slow turnaround times. A survey of coaster movements in late October and early November found that 63 round trip voyages had required 1,422 ship-days instead of the planned 606. Diversions to alternate ports, increasingly bad weather, and vessels being laid up for repairs all contributed to this situation. Between 20 and 25 percent of the coaster fleet was laid up for repairs in November and December. Not until December, after the opening of the port of Antwerp, was it possible to release 50,000 deadweight tons (51,000 deadweight tonnes) of coasters, but that was from support of the 21st Army Group; the American allocation actually increased.

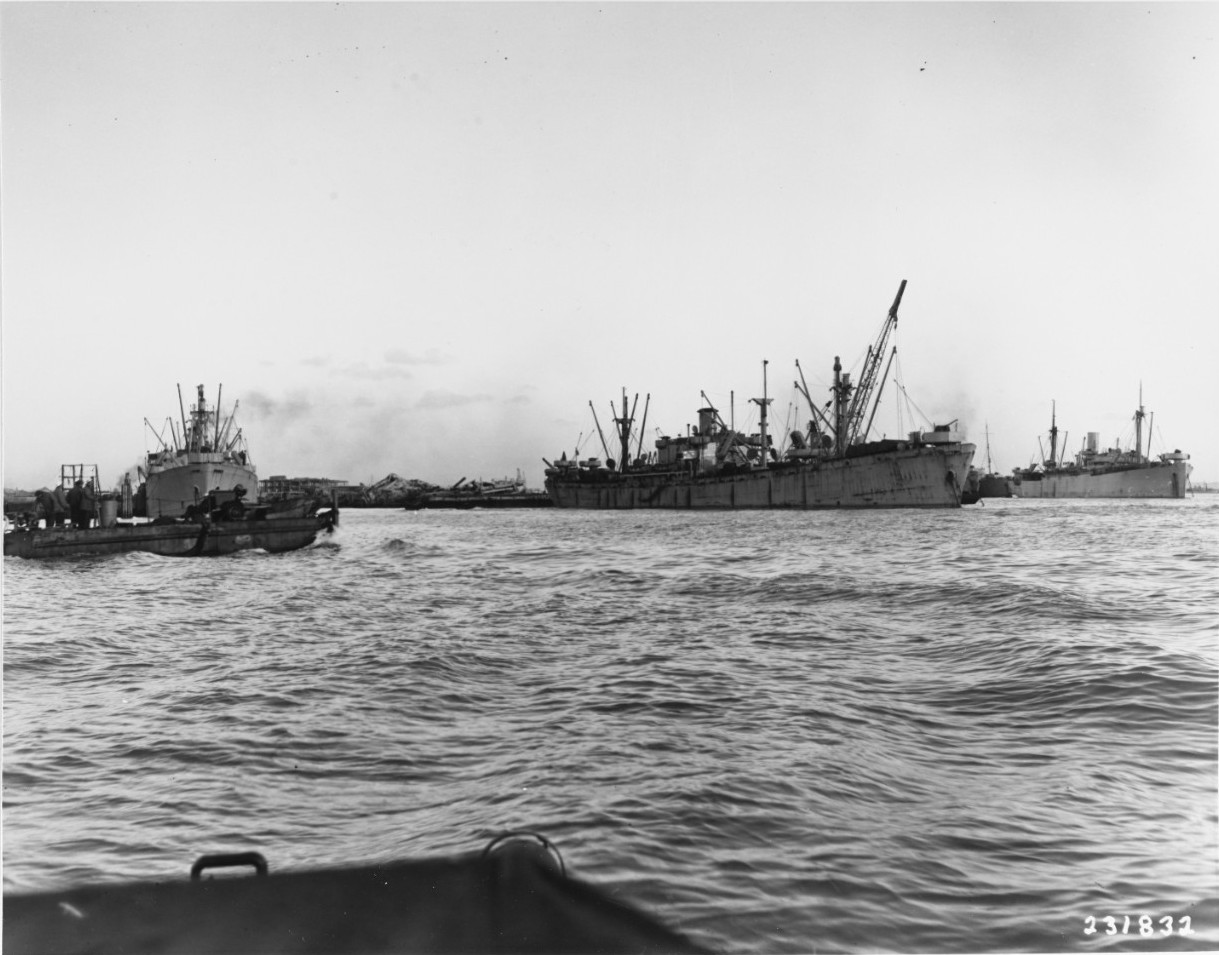
Liberty ships and other freighters in Le Havre harbor in November 1944

It was planned that an increasing volume of supplies would come directly from the United States from September onwards. These ships were not combat loaded, but stowed so as to make optimal use of cargo space. Whereas vehicles had been brought across from the UK on motor transport (MT) vessels (ships specially outfitted to carry vehicles), landing ships, tank (LSTs) or landing craft, tank (LCTs), they now arrived in crates and boxes, with some assembly required. Nearly every ship would arrive with boxed vehicles or other bulky or heavy items. This kind of awkward cargo needed to be discharged at ports where large shore cranes were available; to discharge them over the beaches or at minor ports was difficult, although not impossible. But the only major port in Allied hands on 25 August was Cherbourg. An alternate was to discharge in the UK, assemble them there and transfer the vehicles to the continent in MT ships. SHAEF was allocated 258 MT ships in July, but this was cut to 62 in August, which was still 22 more than originally allocated.

COMZ believed that it could receive 250 ocean-going ships in September, of which 175 would be discharged on the continent and the rest in the UK. It estimated that the available port capacity on the continent would be 27,000 long tons (27,000 t) per day, which was expected to rise to 40,000 long tons (41,000 t) per day in October. By the end of September, 219 ships would require discharge on the continent, which was 44 more than the theater said it needed for its current requirements, the additional supplies being to build up stocks for the future. The forecasts of unloading capacity proved optimistic: in the third week of September, the tonnage of American cargo discharged on the continent was 37,000 long tons (38,000 t) per day, but it dipped to 28,000 long tons (28,000 t) per day in the last week of September, and averaged 25,000 long tons (25,000 t) per day in October. Only 95 ships were discharged on the continent in September.

Keeping ships at anchor was not just wasteful; in a war zone it was also dangerous. An accumulation of idle shipping invited enemy attacks and would subject the ships to damage from the autumn gales. The War Department saw no reason for commodity-loaded vessels (ships loaded with a single class of supply) to be held for longer than the interval between convoy sailings, usually about a week, and cut ten ships from each of the six convoys sailing for Europe between 12 September and 10 October. The Army Service Forces (ASF) and War Shipping Administration (WSA) feared that the ETO's demands might require cuts to the UK Import Program – foodstuffs to keep the British population fed, and raw materials to keep its civil and munitions industries running. As it turned out, only minor cuts had to be made because several MT and store ships were released from cross-Channel traffic in August in time to reach ports in the US and sail for Europe again in September.

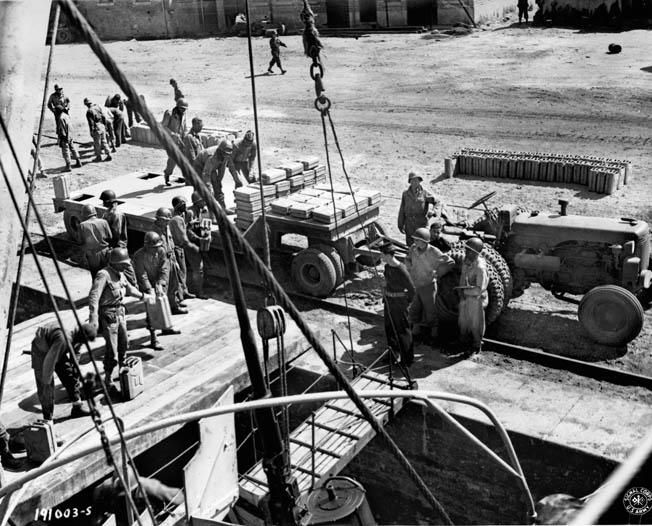
At a French port along the English Channel, US Army stevedores unload empty jerry cans.

Over 200 ships were in European waters awaiting discharge in early October, and Captain Granville Conway, the Deputy Administrator of the WSA, considered the ETO's estimate that 260 would be unloaded in October to be unrealistic. On 6 October the War Department decided to cut another forty ships from the upcoming convoys in October and November. Lee protested that while discharges had not met the forecasts, and much of what had been discharged was merely piling up in Normandy owing to lack of transport resources, the lack of depots on the continent rendered it necessary to retain ships in European waters as floating warehouses for urgent requirements. He had recently called forward nineteen ships loaded with engineering supplies in order to obtain an average of 150 long tons (150 t) of urgently needed equipment from each vessel. ASF was unimpressed, and the cuts went ahead.

Unloadings averaged 25,000 long tons (25,000 t) per day in October, and by 20 October the number of vessels awaiting discharge had risen to over 240, of which 140 were commodity loaded. The Chief of ASF, Lieutenant General Brehon B. Somervell, informed Lee that he could expect no more commodity-loaded ships with rations, vehicles or ammunition until he made headway with reducing the backlogs. Somervell dispatched Brigadier General John M. Franklin, the Assistant Chief of Transportation for water transportation, and a former president of the United States Lines, to advise the ETO on improving turnaround time and developing more realistic estimates of port capacity. He arrived in France on 28 October and was appointed the Assistant Chief of Transportation of COMZ and ETOUSA.

The shipping crisis in the ETO escalated into a global one. Merchant ship construction was lagging behind schedule, mainly due to a deficit of 35,000 skilled workers in the shipyards, as they were being lured away to work on the higher-priority amphibious cargo ships and Boeing B-29 Superfortress programs, where pay and conditions were better. The Allied merchant fleet was still growing at a rate of 500,000 deadweight tons (510,000 deadweight tonnes) per month, but the number of ships available for loading at US ports was shrinking. The problem was growing retentions of vessels by the theaters, of which the ETO was the worst but not the only offender. The chairman of the Maritime Commission, Vice Admiral Emory S. Land, noted that 350 ships were being held idle in the theaters awaiting discharge, and 400 more WSA vessels were being retained for various uses by theater commanders. This represented 7,000,000 deadweight tons (7,100,000 deadweight tonnes) of shipping, which was about 30 percent of all Allied-controlled tonnage. As ships failed to return from overseas on time, supplies began piling up in ports, depots and railway sidings in the United States.

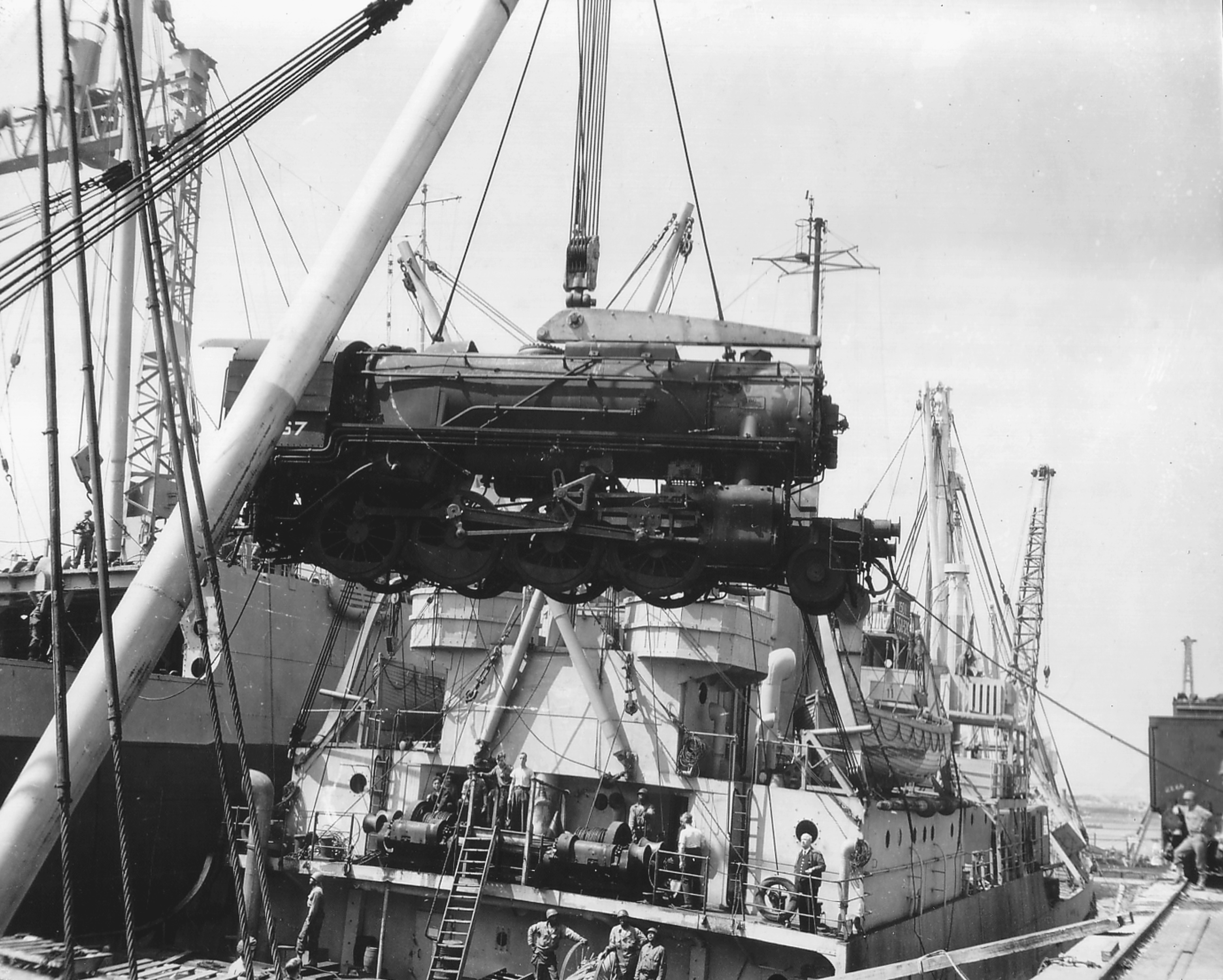
Unloading a locomotive from USAT Seatrain Texas at Cherbourg in August 1944

Drastic measures were required. On 18 November the Joint Chiefs of Staff (JCS) approved and forwarded to President Franklin Roosevelt a memorandum from Somervell recommending cuts in non-military shipments. Specifically, Somervell proposed eliminating the American contribution to the UK Import Program of 40 sailings per month, reducing Lend-Lease to the UK by 12 sailings per month, those to the USSR by 10, and cutting civilian relief to Europe by 34. Conway enlisted Harry Hopkins, Roosevelt's chief advisor, in putting the WSA's case to the president: that it could not ask the British "to bear the brunt of our failure to utilize our ships properly." Roosevelt instructed the WSA to negotiate a cut in the UK Import Program for December 1944, January 1945 and February 1945 with the British, asked the Office of War Mobilization and Reconversion to investigate the labor situation at the shipyards, and told the JCS to get the theaters to break up the pools of idle shipping and improve turnaround times.

COMZ managed to unload 115 ships in November. The port commanders improved the discharge rate from 327 long tons (332 t) per ship per day in October to 457 long tons (464 t) per ship per day in November by offering incentives such as extra leave to their best performing hatch crews. On 6 December the JCS prohibited selective unloading and directed that shipping requirements be modified to match actual discharge capacities. Each theater was ordered to establish a shipping control agency that would ensure compliance with these directives. In the ETO, the shipping control agency consisted of the Chief of Staff of COMZ, Major General Royal B. Lord; his Assistant Chief of Staff (G-4) at COMZ, Brigadier General James H. Stratton; and Franklin. Somervell ordered 25 of the 35 Liberty ships that had been engaged in the cross-Channel service and ships that had been sitting idle with non-urgent supplies after being partially unloaded to return to the United States. The latter resulted in 35,000 long tons (36,000 t) of pierced steel plank and other surfacing for airfields being returned on 21 ships, only to be shipped back again on the next convoy.

The opening of the port of Antwerp on 28 November promised to solve the port capacity problem, but the German Ardennes offensive caused a halt to the movement of supplies to the threatened depots around Liège, and they piled up at the ports. Unloading had to be curtailed, and on 23 December ETOUSA requested that 24 ships be cut from the next convoys. Only 130 ships were unloaded in December, and based on Franklin's sanguine assessment of capacity, the War Department cut the number of sailings to 175 in January and February 1945. By the end of January 1945 116 vessels lay idle awaiting discharge, and on 3 February ETOUSA recommended that March 1945 sailings be cut from 233 to 203. The War Department went even further and reduced it to 172. However, February 1945 saw a steady increase in the discharge rate, which rose to over 50,000 long tons (51,000 t) per day, an increase of 20,000 long tons (20,000 t) per day over what had been achieved in December 1944 and January 1945, and the shipping crisis finally appeared to be resolved.

== Ports ==
=== Minor ports ===
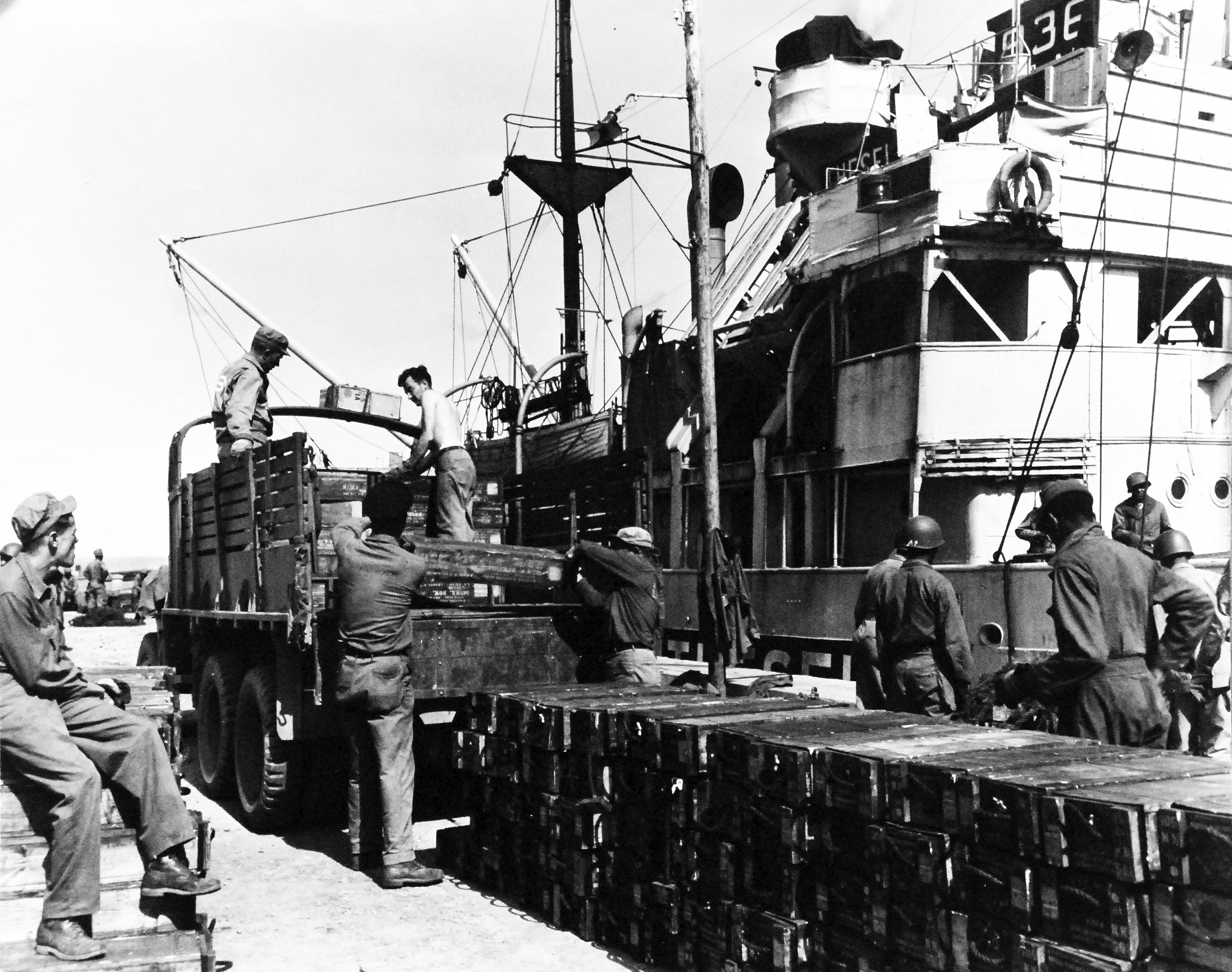
The Dutch coaster Theseus unloads ammunition at Roscoff in September 1944.

When hopes that Brest and Quiberon Bay would soon be opened faded, COMZ decided to compensate by developing the minor ports in Normandy and Brittany. The minor Brittany ports proved uneconomical to operate; their capacity was small, they had no deep-water berths, and by the time many of them were repaired they were hundreds of miles from the front. However, they met a critical need at a time when bad weather threatened to close the Normandy beaches. They were operated by the 16th Major Port, which was relieved by the 5th Major Port in September. The rehabilitation of the Normandy port of Granville was undertaken by the 1055th and 1058th Port Construction and Repair Groups. Granville had been subject to systematic demolition, with quays cratered, cranes tipped into the water, and the harbor blocked with sunken craft. It was operated solely as a coal port, and averaged 1,244 long tons (1,264 t) per day from when it was opened on 18 September until it closed on 21 April 1945.

The task of rehabilitating the Brittany ports of Cancale, Saint-Brieuc and Saint-Malo was carried out by the 1053rd Port Construction and Repair Group and the 360th Engineer General Service Regiment, but work on Saint-Malo was abandoned as it neared completion because the task of opening the inland waterways serving it was not considered worth the effort. It was handed over to the French on 21 November. Tidal conditions at Cancale proved unfavorable, and it was never used. Saint-Brieuc was opened in mid-September but discharges averaged only 317 long tons (322 t) per day, mostly coal for local railways and power stations, and it was handed over to the French on 9 November.

Another minor port in Brittany, Morlaix, was not badly damaged, and it was quickly restored by the 1057th Port Construction and Repair Group. The first convoy of two Liberty ships and ten LSTs arrived on 25 August. Nearby Roscoff was also opened. Between them, they had anchorages for up to six Liberty ships, which were discharged using Army lighters, Navy landing craft and civilian boats, and handled an average of 2,105 long tons (2,139 t) per day until they were closed on 14 December. The opening of the Seine ports of Rouen and Le Havre permitted the closure of shallow-draft minor ports, and the small Normandy ports of Saint-Brieuc, Barfleur, Saint-Vaast-la-Hougue, Carentan, Grandcamp and Isigny were handed over to the French in November.

=== Cherbourg ===
The rehabilitation of Cherbourg fell behind schedule. The first oil tanker did not discharge at the Digue de Querqueville in Cherbourg Harbor until 25 July, over two weeks behind schedule. The British train ferry HMS Twickenham arrived with its first load of diesel electric locomotives and rolling stock on 29 July, but the Jetée du Homet was not yet ready to receive them, and they had to be unloaded with cranes. Although barges and coasters were supposed to commence discharging in the Bassin à Flot on 26 July, it was not until 11 August that they did so. Worst affected by delays were the deep-water berths required for Liberty ships. The first four Liberty ships entered Cherbourg on 16 July, but berths were not yet available. They had to be unloaded at anchor into amphibious trucks known as DUKWs, whose name was pronounced (and sometimes spelled) "ducks".

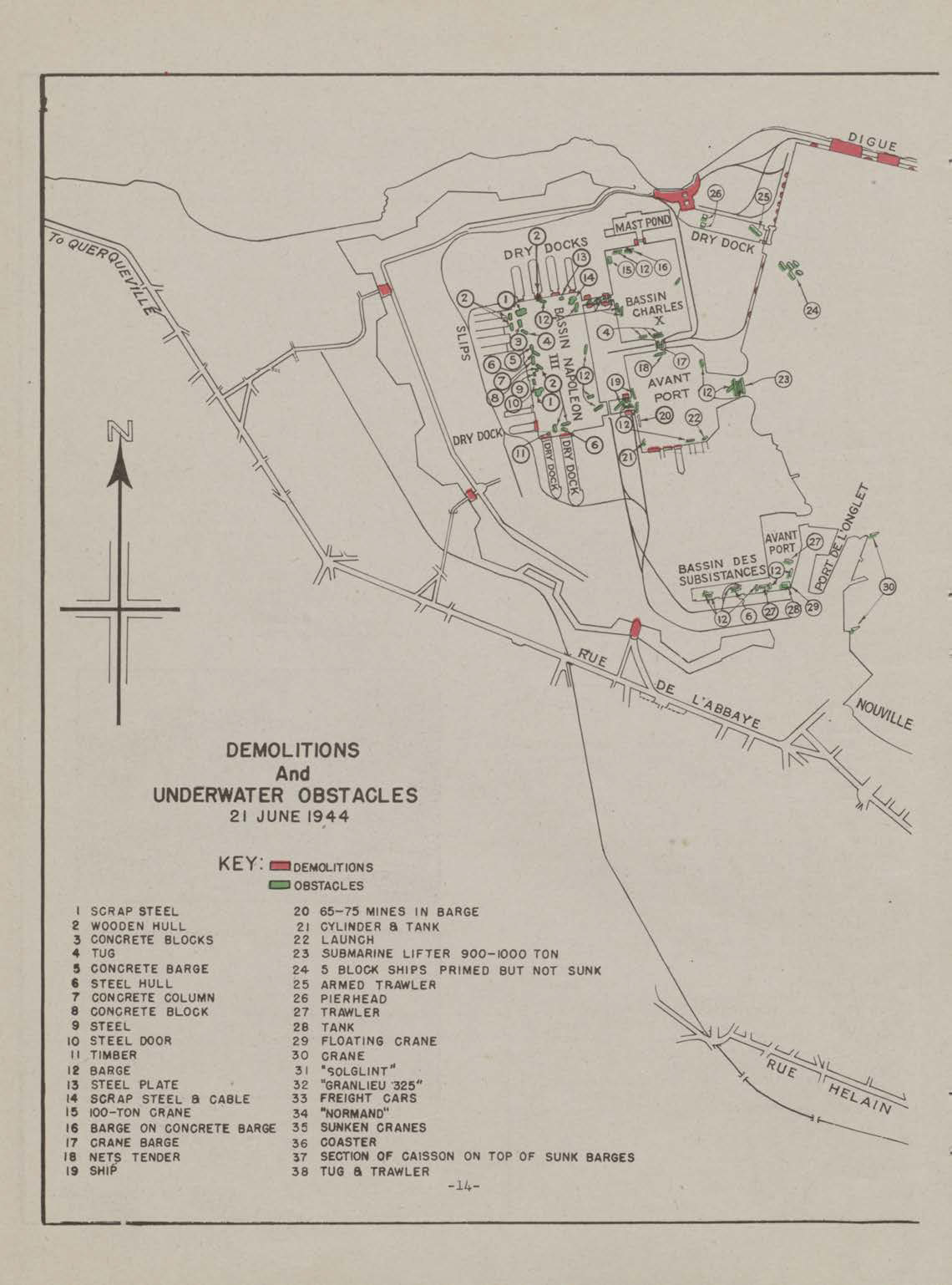
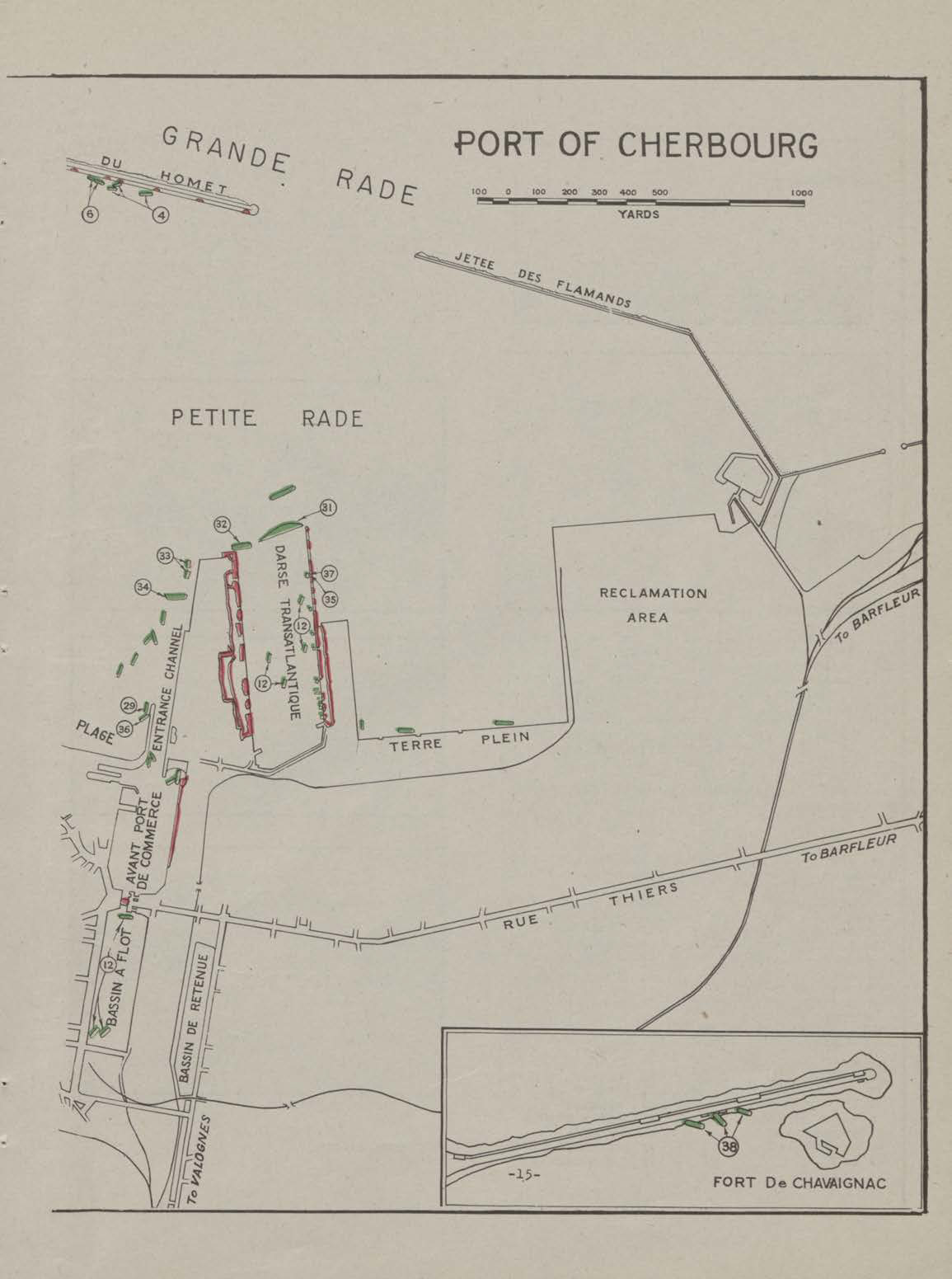
Cherbourg demolitions and underwater obstacles

A Liberty ship was able to berth at the Digue du Homet on 9 August, nineteen days later than planned. Another month passed before berths were available in the Bassin Napoléon III, and it was 21 September before the Bassin Charles X was opened. The Darse Transatlantique was not cleared of mines until 21 August and the access channel was not cleared until 18 September. The first Liberty ship did not berth there until 8 October. The rehabilitation effort was reported as 75 percent complete in mid-September, but only five of the planned twenty-eight deep-water berths were operational by then. Not until 15 December was the rehabilitation work completed.

The port of Cherbourg was operated by the 4th Port, under the command of Colonel Cleland C. Sibley, which was augmented by Colonel August H. Schroeder's 12th Port. From 16 August, the 4th Port was part of Colonel Theodore Wyman Jr.'s Normandy Base Section. The operation of a major port requires a great deal of coordination, and much of this was worked out through trial and error. Bringing vessels into the port was a US Navy responsibility, but the Naval harbor master would take the Army's preferences into account in deciding what berth should be used. For example, the Army preferred vessels with cargo suitable for unloading by DUKW anchor in the Petit Rade to avoid long hauls from the Grande Rade. But communication between the office of the Naval harbor master and the headquarters of the 4th Port was unsatisfactory at first, and it took time to develop a smooth working relationship.

Problems arose when ships arrived unexpectedly and there were no preparations to receive them. Advance warning of ship arrivals was necessary because unloading a ship was a complicated business. Sufficient stevedores had to be provided to work the hatches, and the required cargo handling equipment, such as cranes, had to be available. Trucks and railway cars had to be brought forward and spotted on the quays to allow cargo to be quickly cleared, and the depots and dumps had to be alerted to be ready to receive the supplies. Some arrived without manifests or stowage plans. In some cases the only way the contents of a ship could be determined was for the port personnel to board it and physically check. At first the Navy refused to allow ships without manifests to enter the port at all, but too often they were found to contain critical cargo.

Port discharge and clearance at Cherbourg (July to December 1944)
Month	Discharged		Cleared by rail		Cleared by road	
July	31,627 long tons	32,135 t	1,212 long tons	1,231 t	27,257 long tons	27,694 t
August	266,444 long tons	270,720 t	94,692 long tons	96,212 t	152,731 long tons	155,182 t
September	314,431 long tons	319,477 t	162,021 long tons	164,621 t	166,118 long tons	168,784 t
October	365,592 long tons	371,459 t	191,307 long tons	194,377 t	161,814 long tons	164,411 t
November	433,301 long tons	440,254 t	242,004 long tons	245,887 t	150,026 long tons	152,433 t
December	250,112 long tons	254,126 t	155,797 long tons	158,297 t	97,202 long tons	98,762 t

Of the 439,660 long tons (446,720 t) of Army cargo discharged at Cherbourg by 13 September, just 38.4 percent was unloaded at quayside berths or over LST ramps; the rest was unloaded by DUKWs and lighters. This was slower and more manpower intensive than quayside unloading due to multiple handling. DUKWs were suitable only for handling small, packaged items, and had a rated capacity of 2 1/2 long tons (2.54 t), although they were frequently overloaded. Bulkier or heavier items could be unloaded onto barges, but they too had limitations. While DUKWs could go ashore at the Nouvelle Plage at any time, barges had to be tied to mooring boats and await high tide before they could be towed into the basins for unloading. Both were subject to disruption by bad weather. Communications were a problem initially, with the Navy's signal lamp not up to the task. A small Signal Corps Radio was employed instead. Two radio networks were eventually established: one for the tugboats, and one for coordinating hatch operations.

The 4th Port was handicapped by the slow arrival of its unit equipment, which had been brought from the UK on twelve ships but unloaded at Utah Beach instead of Cherbourg. The hatch crew found themselves lacking basic gear such as ropes, slings and cargo nets, and three DUKWs went around collecting gear from ships in the harbor. Cranes were also in short supply, and this was exacerbated by a dearth of well-trained crane operators. In the UK, where the 4th Port had worked the docks along the River Mersey, crane operating had been mostly carried out by experienced civilians. A training program was initiated at Cherbourg, where crane operators were instructed by a pair of sergeants who had learned crane operation in the UK. In the meantime, inexperienced operators caused avoidable damage both to cranes and to cargo. Insufficient numbers of skilled mechanics were available to repair the cranes, and there was a shortage of spare parts as well. The result was that at times half the cranes were out of action.

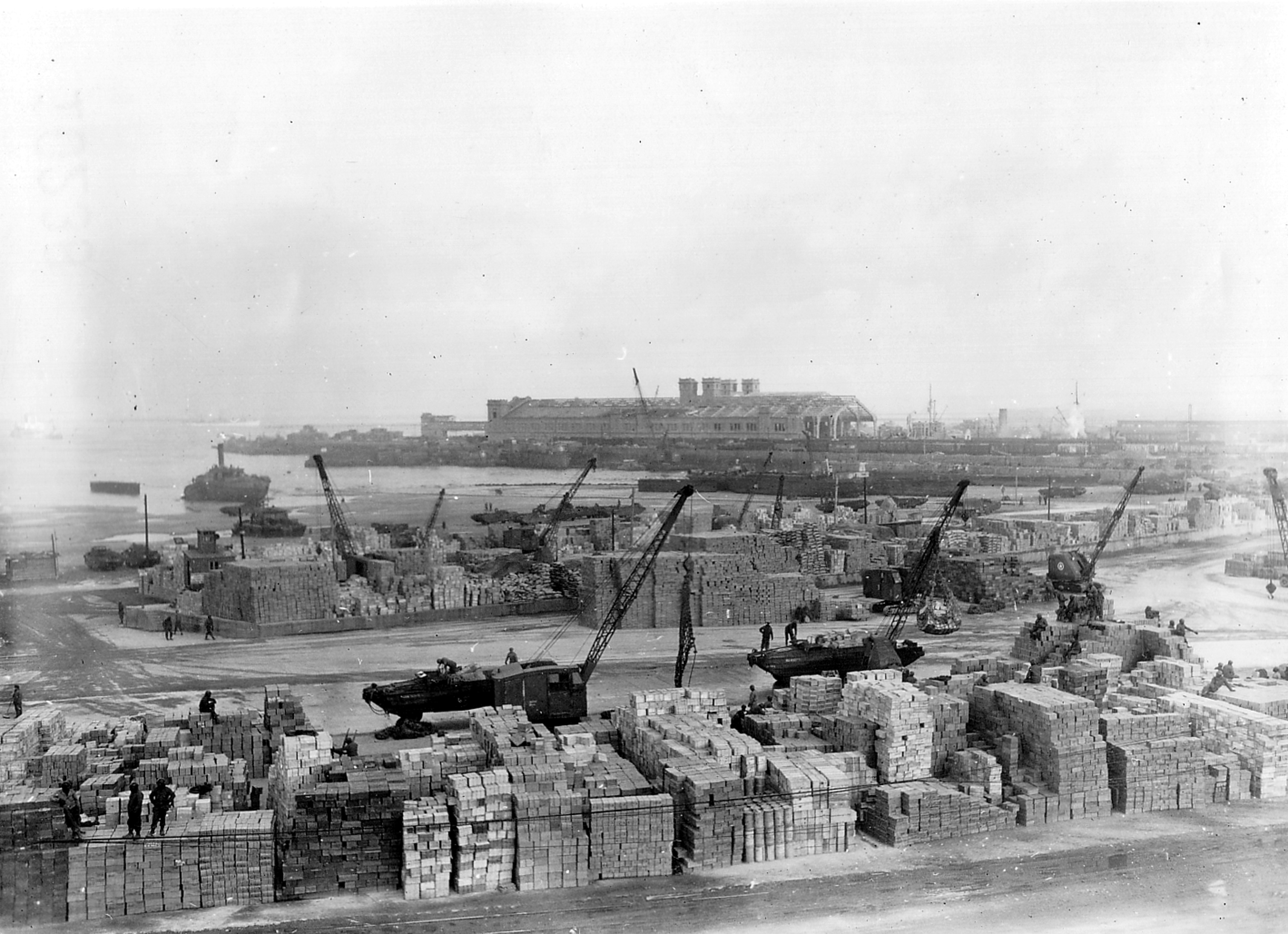
Supplies at the port of Cherbourg in December

Disappointing discharge figures led to Sibley being relieved of command. He was succeeded by Colonel James A. Crothers on 29 September. Despite the worsening weather, the tonnage of cargo discharged at Cherbourg climbed from 10,481 long tons (10,649 t) per day in September to 11,793 long tons (11,982 t) per day in October, mainly due to increased quantities being unloaded at the quaysides. By then it was evident that while the target of discharging 20,000 long tons (20,321 t) per day might be achievable, port discharge was only half the battle; the cargo also had to be cleared away from the port and taken to the depots and dumps. Motor transport was in demand to support the armies, and the rains turned the dirt roads around the dumps into mud, resulting in bogged-down vehicles. Railway facilities were improved, with 90 miles (140 km) of additional track laid, and two large marshalling yards were built outside the city.

Whenever there were a few days running of good weather, cargo built up at the port. SHAEF was dissatisfied with how the port was being run, and on 30 October Wyman was relieved of command of the Normandy Base Section and replaced by Major General Lucius D. Clay, on loan from ASF. Clay recognized that the heart of the problem was a lack of coordination between the port and rail operations, and he delegated the necessary authority over the railways to Crothers. This brought about an improvement in clearance tonnage in November. Clay remained for only a few weeks. On 26 November Colonel Eugene M. Caffey assumed temporary command of the Normandy Base Section until Major General Henry S. Aurand arrived on 17 December. Unloading at Cherbourg reached its peak in November. With the opening of ports further north it declined in importance, although it remained an important port for the discharge of ammunition.

=== Le Havre ===
The Seine ports had figured prominently in the Overlord plan, but for the supply of the 21st Army Group, not the American forces. It was expected that they would replace the British Normandy beaches around D plus 120, and be handed over to the Americans around D plus 240, when the Channel ports had been opened. Rouen was captured on 30 August but was not usable until downstream Le Havre was also taken on 12 September. An American line of communication from Le Havre would cross that of the British, but Le Havre was 200 miles (320 km) closer to the front line than the Brittany ports, and it was estimated that every 5,000 long tons (5,100 t) landed at Le Havre could save the equivalent of seventy quartermaster truck companies. On 11 September the Deputy G–4 for Movements and Transportation at SHAEF, British Major General Charles Napier, recommended that Le Havre be assigned to COMZ. It was now anticipated that the maintenance of US forces would eventually be provided through Antwerp, Rotterdam and Amsterdam.

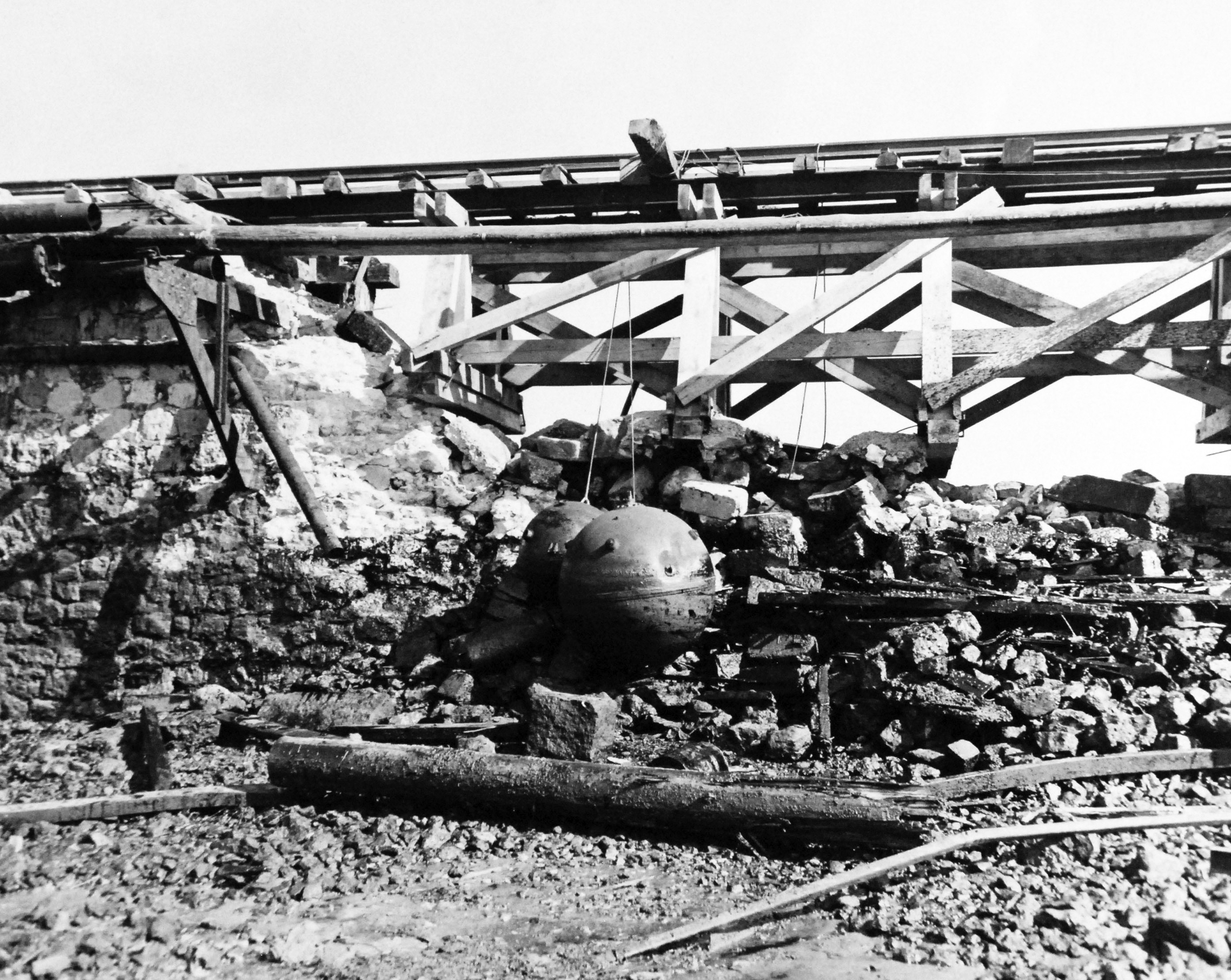
Destruction at Le Havre. Booby-trapped German mines are lashed to a railway causeway.

Le Havre had been the second largest port in France before the war, but it had been heavily damaged by German demolitions and Allied land, sea and aerial bombardment. Lee directed that Le Havre would be developed as an interim port capable of handling 8,000 to 10,000 long tons (8,100 to 10,200 t) per day. This was to be done as rapidly as possible, with the minimum amount of reconstruction effort. The rehabilitation of Le Havre and Rouen was assigned to a task force under the command of Colonel Frank F. Bell, the commander of the 373rd Engineer General Service Regiment. In addition to his own regiment, he ultimately also had the 1055th and 1061st Engineer Port Construction and Repair Groups, the 392nd Engineer General Service Regiment, the 1071st Engineer Port Repair Ship Crew, the 1044th Engineer Gas Generating Unit, the 971st Engineer Maintenance Company, the 577th Engineer Dump Truck Company and two Royal Navy parties. The Seabees of the 28th Naval Construction Battalion also worked there.

The first Liberty ships entered the inner harbor of Le Havre on 19 September, but mines and obstructions limited the docks to landing craft and coasters. USS Miantonomah brought port clearance supplies from Cherbourg to Le Havre on 21 September, but on departure on 25 September it navigated the inner and outer harbors and cleared the blockships only to strike a mine and sink. Not until 13 October was the first Liberty ship able to dock.

The Seabees built a 60-by-1,000-foot (18 by 305 m) floating pier outside the main sea wall from pontoons capable of handling six cargo vessels that was connected to the shore with a Bailey bridge. Two artificial piers were made from Phoenix breakwaters salvaged from the Mulberry harbor. A major problem was damage to the Rochemont lock gates, which subjected the quay walls to damage from the hydrostatic pressure of the 25 to 40 feet (7.6 to 12.2 m) tides. After several unsuccessful attempts to repair them in place, the 1055th Port Construction and Repair Group removed the gates, repaired them in the dry dock, and completed their reinstallation on 30 November. As a result, the tidal range in the wet basins was reduced by 20 ft (6.1 m). Inside the gates the Seabees constructed floating piers by joining pairs of rhino ferries taken from Omaha Beach. These were made stationary by driving timber pilings, and connected to the shore by a Bailey bridge. The first Liberty ship passed through the lock on 16 December.

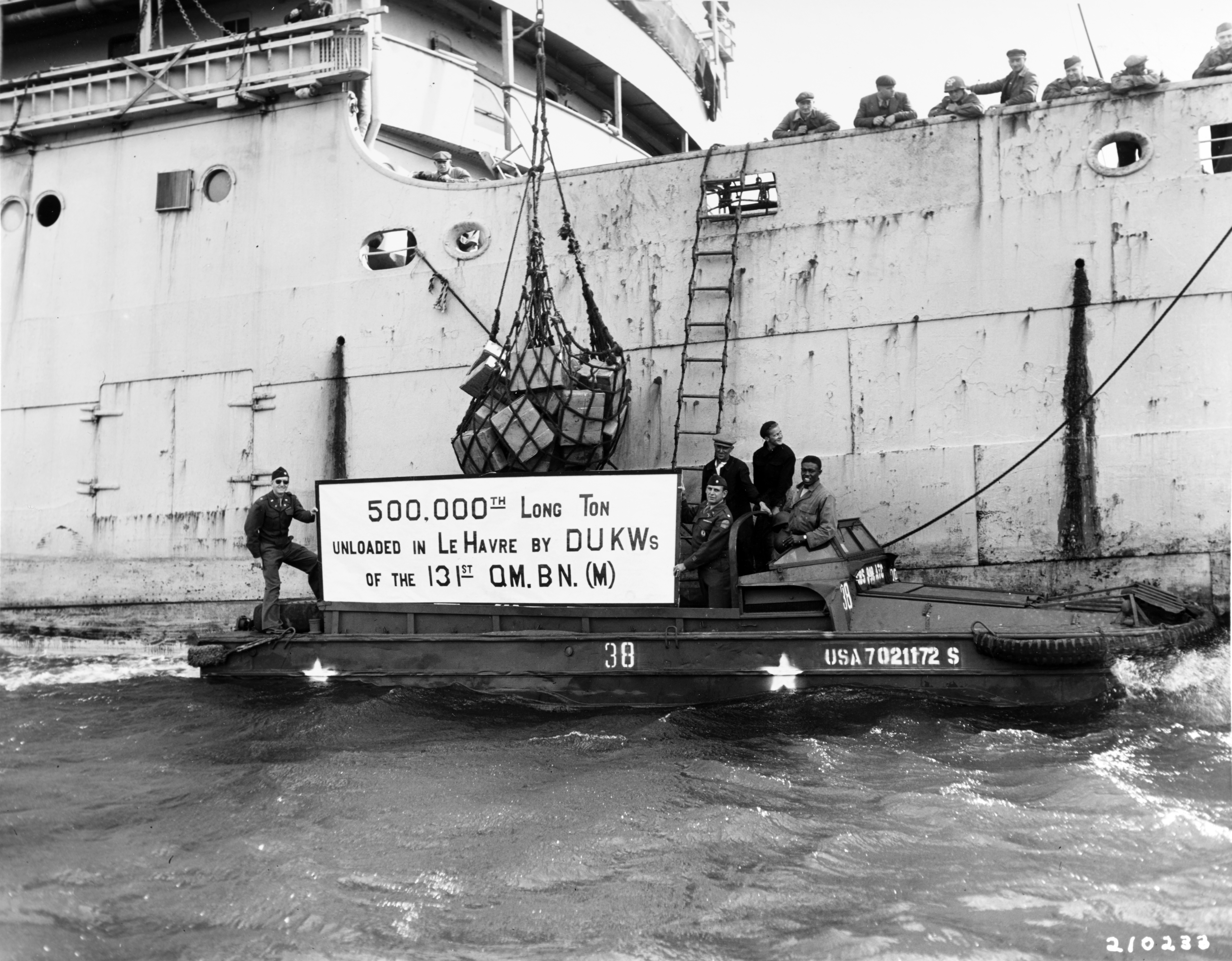
The 500,000th long ton of cargo is unloaded by DUKW at Le Havre on 11 August 1945.

Le Havre was operated by the 16th Major Port, under the command of Brigadier General William M. Hoge, who had commanded the Provisional Engineer Special Brigade Group on Omaha Beach. He was succeeded by Colonel Thomas J. Weed on 31 October. It was joined by the 52nd Port in January. The number of berths that the logisticians felt was necessary were never developed, so the port continued to depend on DUKWs and lighters. In the first quarter of 1945, seven DUKW companies handled 35.2 percent of the cargo; quayside discharges accounted for 23.3 percent and lighters handled the rest.

The use of DUKWs had its drawbacks in the multiple handling of cargo and interruptions to operations occasioned by bad weather. DUKWs had never been intended to operate for long periods of time, but one company reported that its DUKWs had over 70,000 miles (110,000 km) on the clock. By November, about 76 percent of the DUKWs were inoperable. Chronic shortages of spare parts forced a resort to cannibalizing inoperable vehicles, and improvisations such as making propeller shaft strut bearings from applewood and replacement rudders from scrap metal. Nonetheless, the port exceeded COMZ's expectations, handling 9,500 long tons (9,700 t) per day by the end of December.

In that month, the port dispatched 92 trains carrying ammunition to the forward areas in response to the German Ardennes offensive, and rockets were rushed to Liège to help defend the threatened base area there. By the year's end, the 16th Major Port and some 4,000 French civilian stevedores had unloaded 434,920 long tons (441,900 t) of cargo. In 1945 the work force was augmented with 6,000 German prisoners of war. The port set a record of 198,768 long tons (201,958 t) in January 1945, and by the end of May had unloaded 1,254,129 long tons (1,274,254 t).

In addition to handling cargo Le Havre also became an important debarkation point for American troops. In January 1945 the 52nd Port was attached to the 16th Major Port and its commander, Colonel William J. Deyo, was given responsibility for troop movements. That month the Red Horse Staging Area was established in the Le Havre area. Troops debarked over a long steel ponton pier and a troopship berth at the Quai d'Escale. Arrivals peaked at 247,607 troops in March 1945.

=== Rouen ===
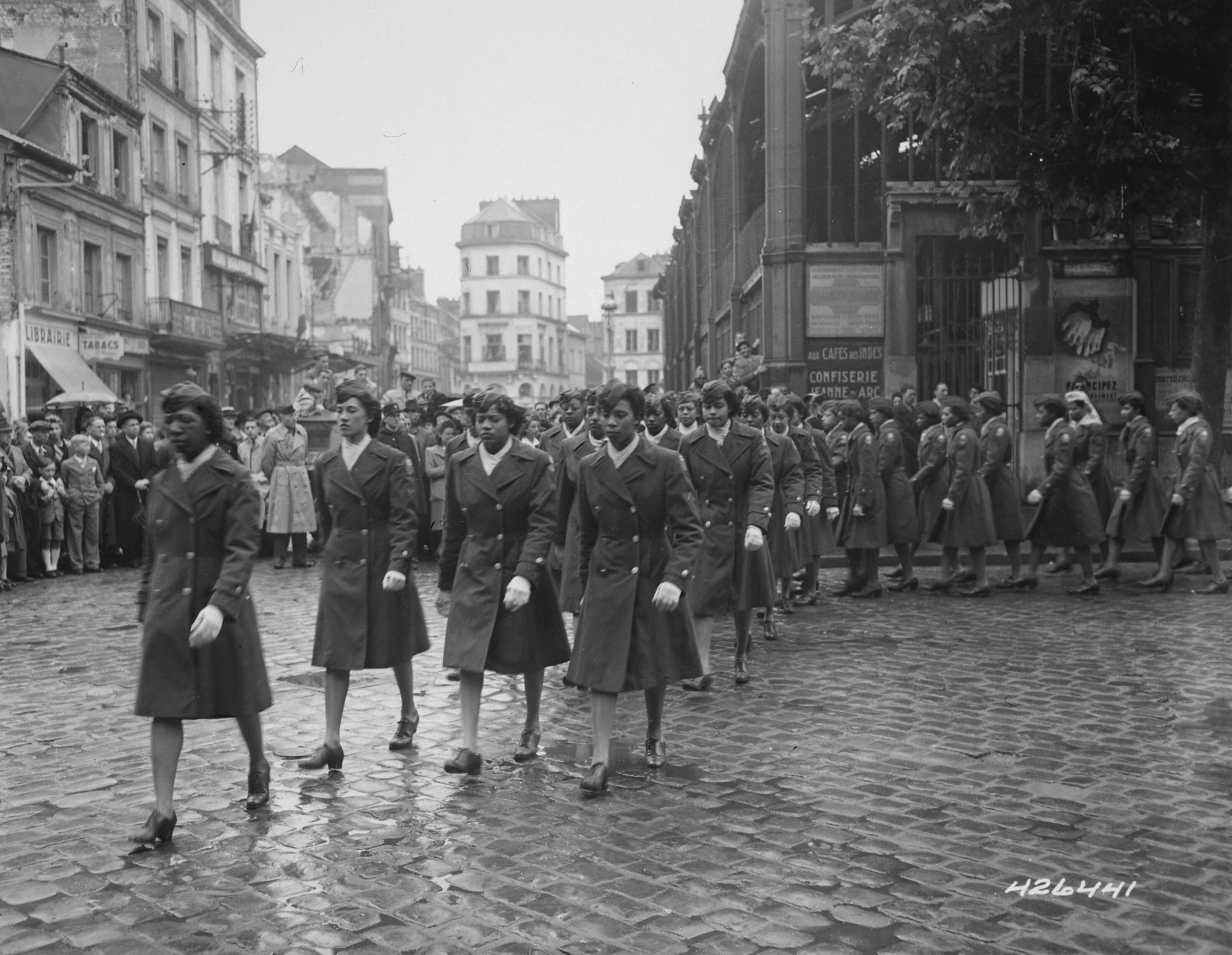
Members of the 6888th Central Postal Directory Battalion based in Rouen take part, in a May 1945, parade in honor of Joan of Arc at the marketplace there where she was burned at the stake.

Rouen was not as badly damaged as Le Havre. The Germans had demolished the cargo handling facilities and blocked the river channel with toppled cranes and sunken boats and barges, but 14,000 feet (4,300 m) of the quays were still in good condition. The nearby marshalling yards had been heavily damaged by Allied bombing, but another yard 12 miles (19 km) away was easily accessible by road. The rehabilitation task was undertaken by elements of the Le Havre engineering task force consisting of the 1061st Engineer Port Construction and Repair Group, a Royal Navy party, and a platoon of the 37th Engineer Combat Battalion. The more difficult task of clearing away the mines and removing sunken vessels obstructing the river channel was handled by the US Navy with the help of French authorities.

Rouen was operated by a detachment of the 16th Major Port until the 11th Port took over on 20 October. The first ships to arrive were a pair of coasters from the UK carrying petrol, oil and lubricants (POL) on 15 October. At this point nine berths were available, and the port's rehabilitation was estimated to be 20 percent completed. During the month it handled 23,844 long tons (24,227 t) from 48 different vessels, most of which were coasters. Larger vessels could be accommodated, but they first had to be partially unloaded in Le Havre in order to negotiate the shallow channel between Le Havre and Rouen. During a neap tide a ship had to be lightened to draw no more than 16 1/2 feet (5.0 m) lest it block the channel for ten days until the spring tide arrived. The US Army had four hopper dredges that had been earmarked for work on the Loire River, but only one, the Hoffman, operated by the 1077th Engineer Dredge Crew, had a shallow enough draft to operate on the Seine. Special care had to be taken to avoid grounding the dredge.

The port was so successful that on 8 November COMZ ordered all coasters except those carrying coal to unload at Rouen. Discharges rose to 127,569 long tons (129,616 t) in November and 132,433 long tons (134,558 t) in December. The port's main problem was not a shortage of berths, but of labor and road and railway resources for port clearance. Clearance by barge over the inland waterways commenced on 22 November and was mainly used to meet civilian needs. Troops began debarking at Rouen, starting with a landing ship, infantry (LSI) on 10 November, and 51,111 troops passed through that port by the end of the year. In the same period 22,078 vehicles arrived on LSTs, coasters and MT ships. The port's peak of activity was in March 1945, when 15 Liberty ship and 26 coaster berths were available and it handled 268,174 long tons (272,477 t) of cargo; 9,000 US Army troops, 5,000 French civilians, and 9,000 prisoners of war were working the port.

=== Antwerp ===
Before the war Antwerp had been one of the world's busiest ports, handling 12,000 vessels and nearly 60,000,000 long tons (61,000,000 t) of freight in 1938. It was situated on the Scheldt River some 55 miles (89 km) inland, but unlike other ports on tidal estuaries, it could receive deep draft vessels on all tides. With a minimum depth at the quays of 27 feet (8.2 m), the river was still 500 yards (460 m) wide at this point, which gave even the largest vessels ample room to maneuver. The port had 3 1/2 miles (5.6 km) of quays along the river, and nearly 26 miles (42 km) more in eighteen wet basins accessible through four locks. There were 322 hydraulic and 270 electric cranes, and numerous floating cranes and grain elevators. There were 900 warehouses, a granary capable of storing nearly 1,000,000 imperial bushels (36,000,000 L) and 750,000 cubic feet (21,000 m^{3}) of cold storage. Petroleum pipelines ran from the tanker berths to 498 storage tanks with a capacity of 100,000,000 imperial gallons (450,000,000 L). Labor to work the port was plentiful, and included skilled boat crews, crane operators and mechanics. Antwerp was well-served by roads, railway and canals for barge traffic. There were 500 miles (800 km) of railway lines that connected to the Belgian railway system, and there was also access to inland waterways. Through the Albert Canal, barges could reach the Meuse River, which ran through Liège, where the American bases were located.

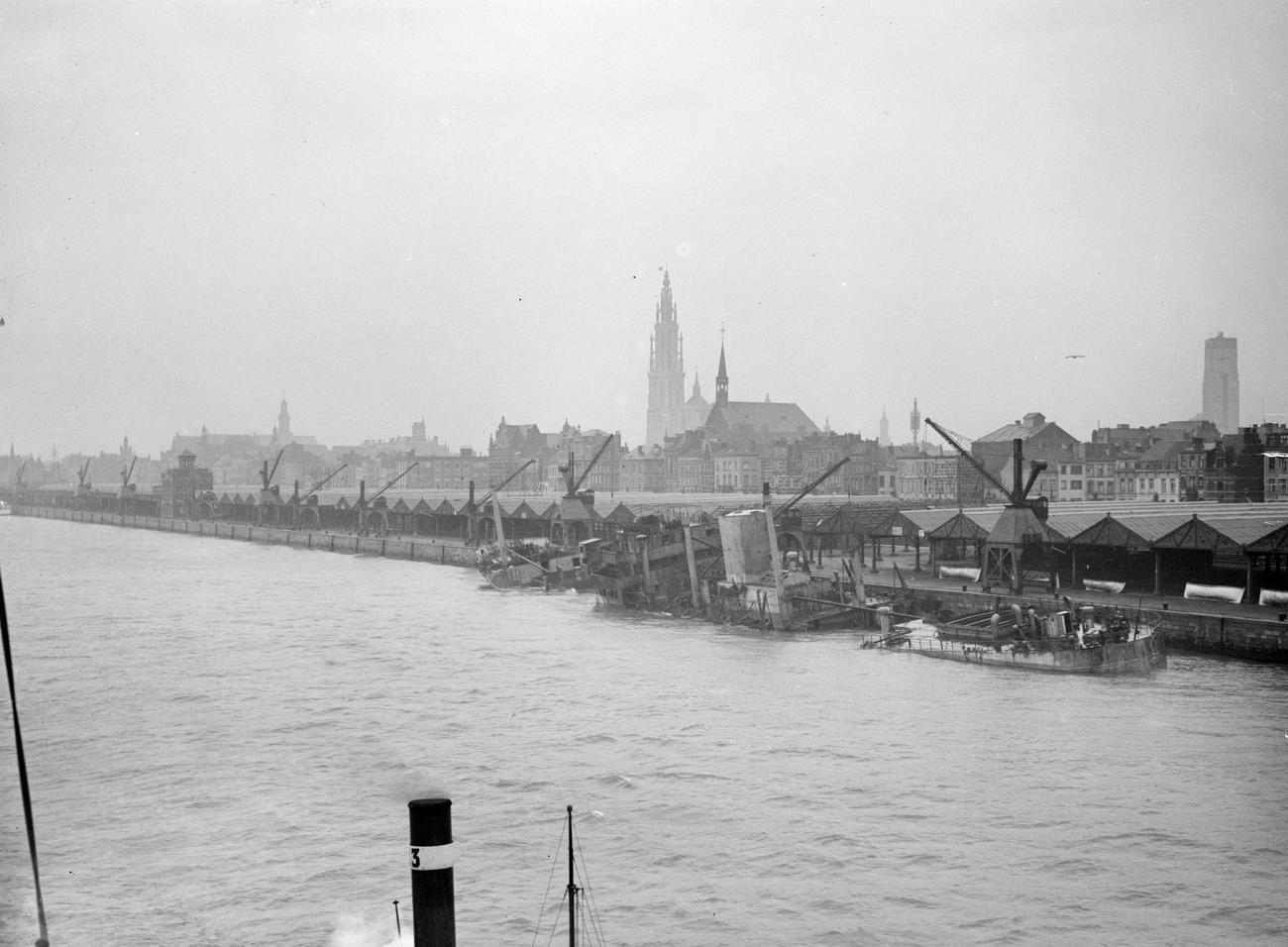
First Allied convoy enters Antwerp. The docks at Antwerp with a ship scuttled by the Germans before they retreated.

Antwerp was captured on 4 September, with its port facilities largely intact thanks to the British Army's rapid advance, and the efforts of the Belgian Resistance, which assisted the British 11th Armoured Division in finding the least heavily defended route into the city and forestalled the German demolition of the port facilities. Antwerp was just 65 miles (105 km) from the depots around Liège supporting the First Army, and even though the Third Army depots around Nancy were 250 miles (400 km) from Antwerp, this was closer than Cherbourg, which was more than 400 miles (640 km) from the depots. It was estimated that 21 divisions could be supported from Cherbourg, of which 6 would be by road and 15 by rail, but 54 divisions could be supported by rail from Antwerp. However, the Allied Naval Commander-in-Chief, Admiral Sir Bertram Ramsay, noted on 3 September that the entrances to Antwerp and Rotterdam could be blocked and mined, and it could not be predicted how long it would take to open them. Operations to clear the Scheldt estuary were initiated by the First Canadian Army in October, and completed in the first week of November.

Both COMZ and the 12th Army Group urged SHAEF to allocate a portion of Antwerp's capacity to the support of the American forces. On considering the matter SHAEF concluded that Antwerp was indeed sufficiently large to serve the needs of both the British and the American forces. Eisenhower rejected a proposal from Lee that it be operated jointly, as joint control of ports had been shown to not work well in the past; the port was to be run by the British. Lee arranged a conference in Antwerp with representatives of COMZ and the 21st Army Group between 24 and 26 September. Tentative agreements were reached on the allocation of tonnage capacity, storage facilities and railway lines, and arrangements were made for the command and control of the port and its installations, and regarding responsibility for rehabilitation works. Additional matters were discussed at a second conference in Brussels on 5 October, and the result was formalized in a Memorandum of Agreement that became known as the "Treaty of Antwerp", and was signed by Major General Miles Graham, the Major General Administration at 21st Army Group, and Colonel Fenton S. Jacobs, the commander of the Channel Base Section.

The American forces would use the basins to the north of a line drawn through the Bassin Albert (Albertdok), and the British would use those to the south. The Americans were guaranteed a minimum of 62 berths. The basins along the river would be shared, and allocated based on need. It was expected that the port would handle 40,000 long tons (41,000 t) per day not counting bulk POL, of which 22,500 long tons (22,900 t) was allocated to the Americans and 17,500 long tons (17,800 t) to the British. Overall command of the port was vested in the Royal Navy Naval Officer in Charge (NOIC), Captain Cowley Thomas, who also chaired a port executive committee on which both American and British interests were represented. Local administration was the responsibility of the British base sub area commander. US forces were allocated primary rights to the roads and railway lines leading southeast to Liège, while the British were given those leading to the north and northeast. A joint US, British and Belgian Movements Organization for Transport (BELMOT) was created to coordinate highway, railway and waterway traffic.

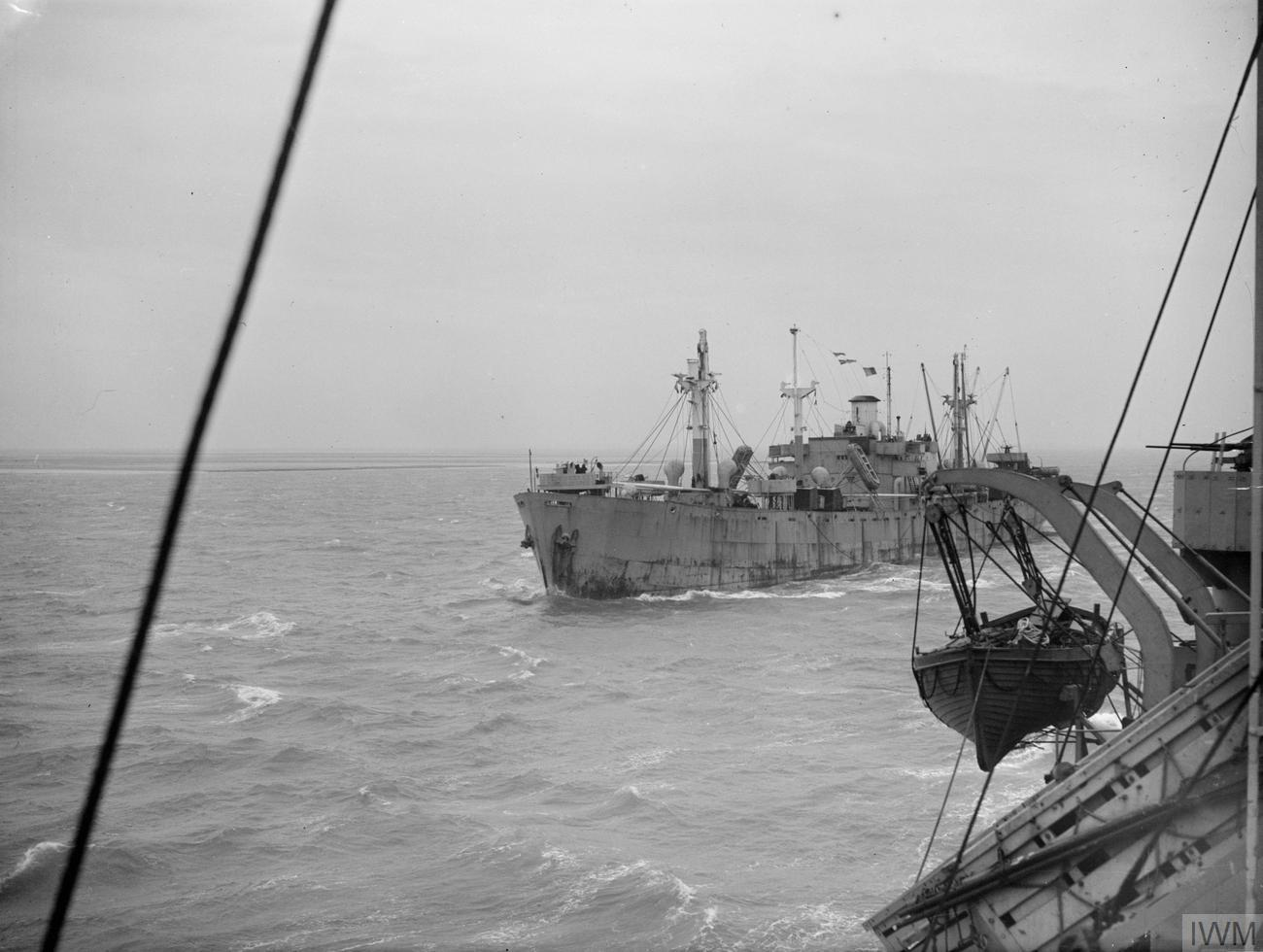
The first Allied convoy enters Antwerp on 28 November. The Liberty ship SS Samhope, the first US ship of the convoy, steams up the Scheldt.

The rehabilitation of the port was undertaken by the British, on the understanding that American resources could be called upon as required. The main US engineer unit assigned was the 358th Engineer General Service Regiment. Two of the ETO's five engineer port repair ships were also available. American engineers cleared rubble away from the quays, improved roads, repaired rail lines, rebuilt warehouses and constructed hardstands. The main American project was the repair of mine damage to the Kruisschans sluice, the longest of the four that connected the river with the wet basins, and the only one that provided access to the American wet basins. Work commenced on 6 November and was completed in time for the arrival of the first Liberty ship, SS James B. Weaver, on 28 November. By this time 219 of the 242 berths were cleared, all the port's cranes were in working order, and all the bridges needed to access the quays had been repaired. The port's floating equipment was augmented by a small fleet of American harbor craft that included 17 small tugboats, 20 towboats and 6 floating cranes.

The 13th Port was assigned to operate the American part of Antwerp, and began arriving from Plymouth in October 1944. It was joined by the 5th Major Port in November and December. The commander of the 13th Port, Colonel Doswell Gullatt, who had led the 5th Engineer Special Brigade at Omaha Beach on D-Day, was designated the overall commander. He had also been the district engineer in Mobile, Alabama, and had extensive experience in flood control and the construction of piers and docks. Most of the work of unloading ships was carried out by Belgian stevedores, some 9,000 of whom were working on the American section of the port on an average day in December. American personnel operated in a supervisory capacity. The biggest problem with the Belgian workers was transporting them to and from their homes, as German V-weapon and air attacks on the port forced many of them to move to the outskirts of the city. The city suffered heavy damage from these attacks, and there were more than 10,000 casualties. The workers' living conditions deteriorated during the winter, and on 16 January they went on strike over shortages of food, clothing and coal. The strike lasted only one day, and it ended when the burgomaster promised the workers food and coal at regulated prices. To keep the civilian workers at their jobs, the city of Antwerp granted workers in the port area a 25 percent increase in pay, but since the V-weapons were fairly inaccurate, this soon led to more industrial disputes when workers elsewhere demanded the same.

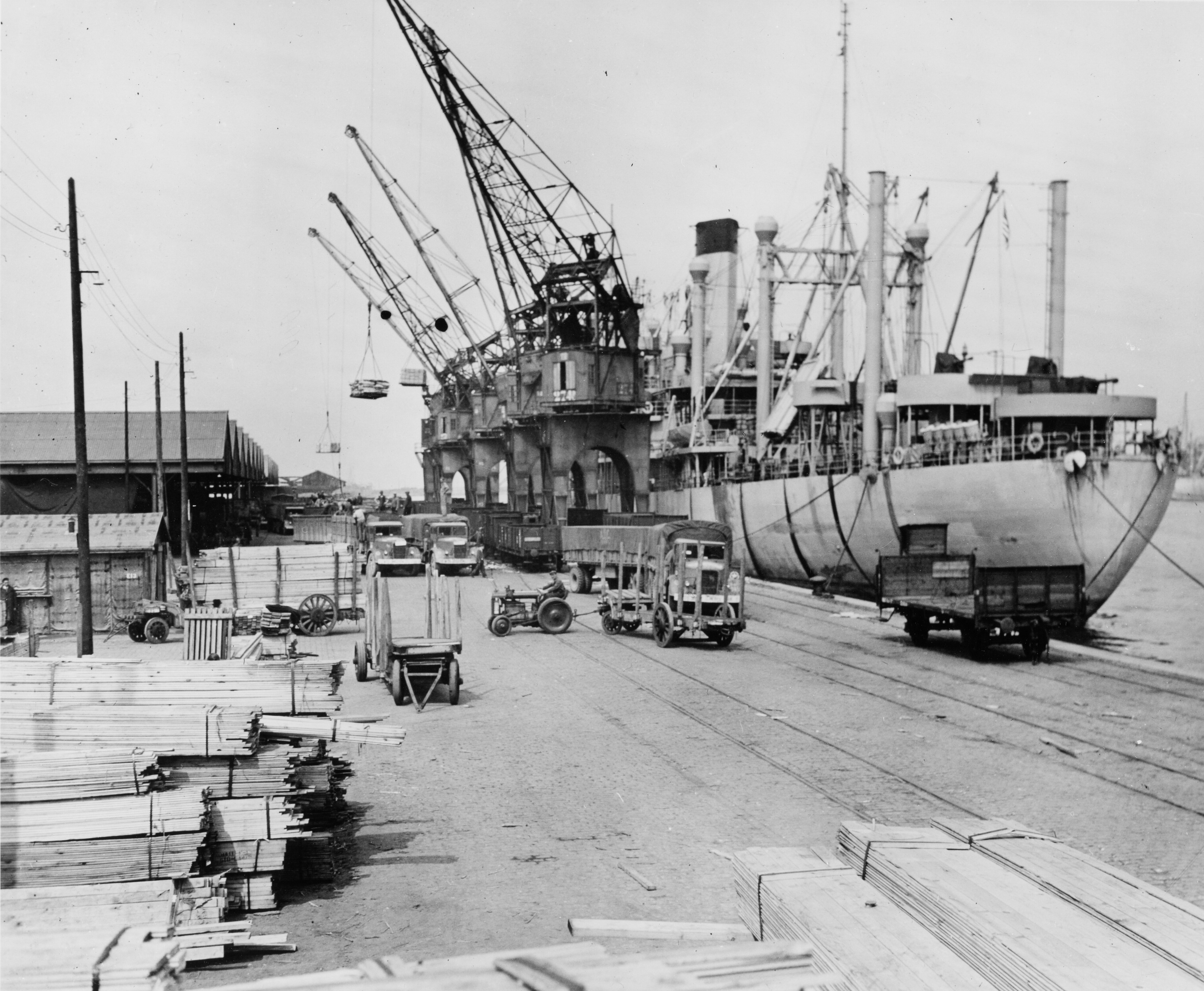
Trucks are loaded at the American section of the Antwerp docks.

Between October 1944 and March 1945 V-1 flying bombs struck Antwerp nearly every day, with 150 striking the port area. Three anti-aircraft brigades were deployed to defend the city under the command of Brigadier General Clare H. Armstrong. The possibility of a V-weapon striking an ammunition ship was taken seriously enough to ban ammunition ships from Antwerp. Ammunition, except some for the anti-aircraft guns around Antwerp, was unloaded at Cherbourg or Le Havre. The danger was real enough: on 8 January a V-2 rocket struck pier 123 about 50 yards (46 m) from the American freighter SS Blenheim. Twenty of those on board were injured, and the ship was so badly damaged that nearly a month was required to effect repairs to enable it to sail. A week later, another V-2 hit berth 218 and badly damaged the Liberty ship Michael de Kovats, injuring three on board and killing a soldier on the pier. V-weapons were also used against the depots around Liège between November 1944 and March 1945. One that struck a fuel dump on 17 December started a fire that consumed 400,000 US gallons (1,500,000 L) of gasoline, and another on 21 December destroyed or badly damaged fourteen railway cars and set fire to six others. Some of the burning cars contained bags of mail from home, which were hastily unloaded.

Antwerp was capable of handling far more than the allotted 40,000 long tons (41,000 t) a day; the limiting factor was clearance. Before the war, Antwerp had been a transit port, and it did not possess large amounts of covered storage space. What there was, was taken over by the British, as Antwerp was the logical site for the 21st Army Group's base installations. The Americans were allocated only a small amount of storage space, none of which was covered, on the assumption that American supplies would immediately be moved to the depots around Liège. Colonel William E. Potter, the G-4 Plans chief at COMZ, estimated that storing any more than 15,000 long tons (15,000 t) in the port area would hamper port operations, but 85,000 long tons (86,000 t) accumulated in the first two weeks of the port's operation. This was mainly due to a shortage of railway rolling stock, but clearance by barge also fell below expectations.

Port operations were interrupted by the German Ardennes offensive, which commenced on 16 December 1944, and threatened the depots around Liège. Rail and barge shipments to the area were halted, and large quantities of supplies piled up in the port area. By 4 January 1945 there were nearly 3,500 railway cars lying fully loaded but idle at the port; thousands more unloaded cars were at the ADSEC depots around Liège. Five anti-aircraft gun battalions were re-roled as infantry to protect Antwerp in case of a German breakthrough. In January, new depots were opened in the Lille area, and supplies began moving again, but the number of railway cars reporting each day was consistently below what was required to clear the backlog. That month, Antwerp handled 432,756 long tons (439,700 t) of cargo, of which 238,518 long tons (242,345 t) was cleared by rail, 120,799 long tons (122,737 t) by road and 41,616 long tons (42,284 t) by barge.

=== Ghent ===
Ghent was an inland port about 20 miles (32 km) from the sea, which was accessed through the Ghent–Terneuzen Canal. Before the war it had been the second busiest port in Belgium after Antwerp. Although captured in September 1944, it had not figured in Allied logistical planning, as Antwerp was considered sufficient. The intensity of the German V-weapon attacks had brought about a reconsideration, and it was decided to activate Ghent as a backup in case Antwerp was temporarily put out of action. Ghent had not been badly damaged, but some bridges had been demolished, the lock gates had been damaged, cranes had been removed and there were some sunken ships. The administration of the port was similar to that of Antwerp, with a port executive committee. Tonnage capacity was divided, with 5,000 long tons (5,100 t) per day for the British and 7,500 long tons (7,600 t) for the Americans. The American sector was operated by the US 17th Port.

Ghent had been used by the Germans only for barge traffic, so bringing it into operation required dredging 450,000 long tons (460,000 t) of sand and aggregate. This was carried out by the US Army hopper dredge W. L. Marshall, which had previously been engaged in dredging the Scheldt, and had several doors blown off by near misses by V-1s and V-2s. As it turned out, the 57-foot (17 m) beam of a Liberty ship could just pass through the Terneuzen locks. The first US Liberty ship to do so, the Hannis Taylor, reached Ghent on 23 January. The port was used for both Liberties and coasters. In its first month of operation, Ghent unloaded only 2,500 long tons (2,500 t) per day, but it was handling twice that by March.

== Highways ==
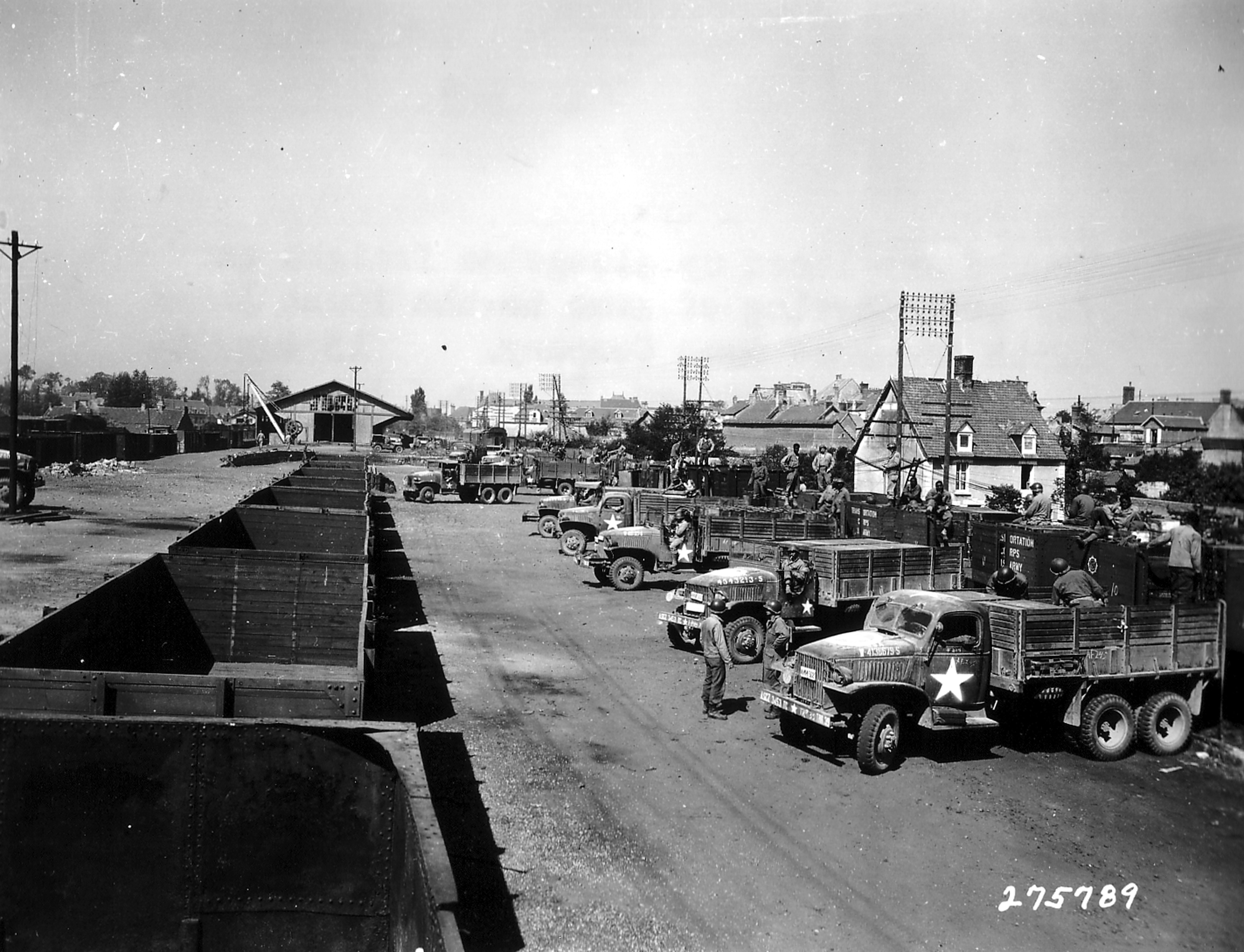
Trucks of ADSEC's 625th Ordnance Ammunition Company at Carentan station in August 1944

Motor transport was the most flexible form of transportation in that it could make deliveries to any location at any time, and could respond rapidly to changing demands. By September 1944 motor transport had three missions: short hauls around depots, port clearance, and long hauls on the lines of communication between them. Most of the activity involved short hauls, but during the pursuit from the Seine to the German border in August and early September, the distance between the armies and the ports and beaches stretched to over 400 miles (640 km), and most of the long haulage had to be carried out by motor transport. On an average day the Red Ball Express dispatched 8,209 long tons (8,341 t) in 1,542 trucks carrying an average load of 5.3 long tons (5.4 t) per truck per round trip that averaged 714 miles (1,149 km). Fortunately, the road network in northern France and Belgium had not been badly damaged, and required little maintenance effort. Highway repair mainly involved filling in potholes.

Although the Red Ball Express was the first and most famous express highway delivery route, it was not the only one. The Red Lion ran from 16 September to 12 October and hauled 18,000 long tons (18,000 t) of supplies from Bayeux to Brussels. Half of the supplies were for the 82nd and 101st Airborne Divisions participating in Operation Market Garden to seize a crossing over the Rhine. Eight companies were withdrawn from the Red Ball Express for the purpose: six equipped with standard GMC CCKW 2½-ton 6×6 trucks, and two with 10-ton semi-trailers. They were supported by two medium automotive maintenance companies, which maintained a pool of replacement vehicles that could be issued in cases where repairs could not be carried out immediately.

The White Ball route was organized by the Channel Base Section and ran from Le Havre and Rouen to rail transfer points in Paris and Reims. It operated from 6 October 1944 to 10 January 1945. An average of 29 truck companies were involved, delivering 134,067 long tons (136,218 t) of supplies with an average outbound trip of 113 miles (182 km). The Green Diamond was organized by the Normandy Base Section and delivered 15,600 long tons (15,900 t) of supplies from Cherbourg to railway transfer points at Granville and Dol between 10 October and 1 November.

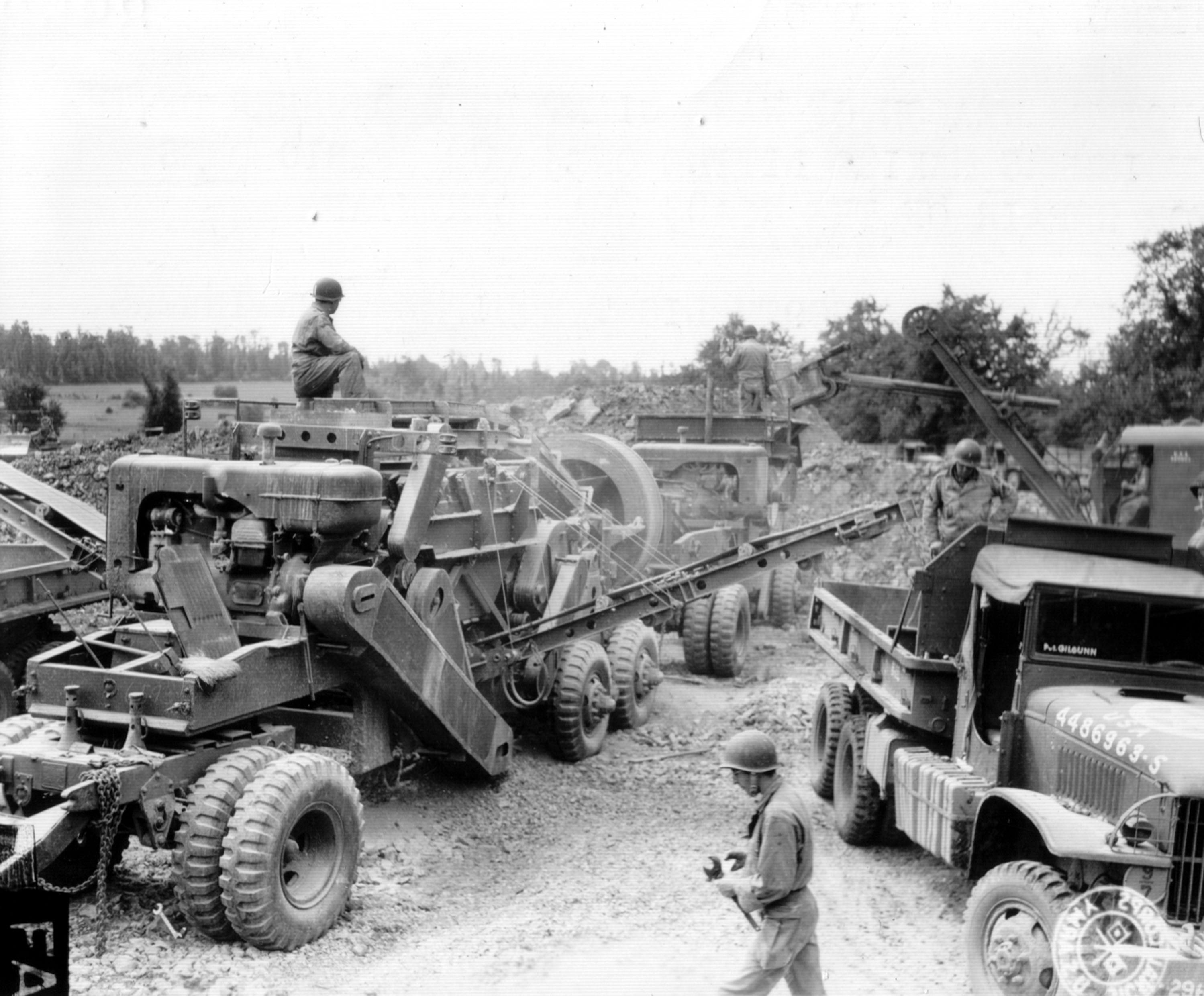
A stone crusher is deployed by the 296th Combat Engineer Battalion.

The last to operate was the ABC Haul, which delivered supplies from Antwerp to the depots around Liège. It differed from the others in that it used an average of sixteen companies, all of which were equipped with semi-trailer trucks with 10-long-ton (10 t) trailers. It ran from 30 November 1944 until 26 March 1945, and hauled 245,000 long tons (249,000 t). There was one more: the Little Red Ball Express, which was organized to deliver 100 long tons (100 t) of critical supplies from Carentan to Paris each day. While the train took three days to make this run, a truck could do it in just one. It ran from 15 December 1944 until 17 January 1945, after which it was replaced by an express train.

Requests for more heavy vehicles led to reduced production of 2½-ton vehicles. The main bottleneck in both cases was the foundries, which could not meet the demand for castings of axles, transmissions, and engines. Nonetheless, there were still more trucks available at the New York Port of Embarkation than could be shipped, due to the port capacity crisis. The War Department canceled sailings of ships loaded with trucks, and none were delivered in November or December. Instead, priority was given to the shipment of tires, inner tubes, antifreeze and spare parts for the vehicles already in the theater.

Tires were the most critical item, being in short supply because the Japanese had overrun most of the world's sources of natural rubber in 1942. The main causes of loss of tires were overload-induced blowouts and damage from carelessly discarded C ration cans that littered the roads, but even disregarding damage from accidents, blowouts or enemy action, the life expectancy of a truck tire was about 12,000 miles (19,000 km). The War Department had allotted a replacement factor of 7.5 percent per month, but during August and September trucks were run over much greater distances than had been anticipated. An ADSEC inspection in September revealed that 70 percent of its trucks had been run for over 10,000 miles (16,000 km). The replacement of thousands of worn-out tires commenced that month. Repairing and retreading efforts could not keep up with demand, mainly due to shortages of materials such as the camelback rubber used for repairs. By November the 12th Army Group was reporting that the shortage of tires was impeding combat operations, and the following month all 10-ton trailers and 1,000 trucks were off the road because there were no tires.

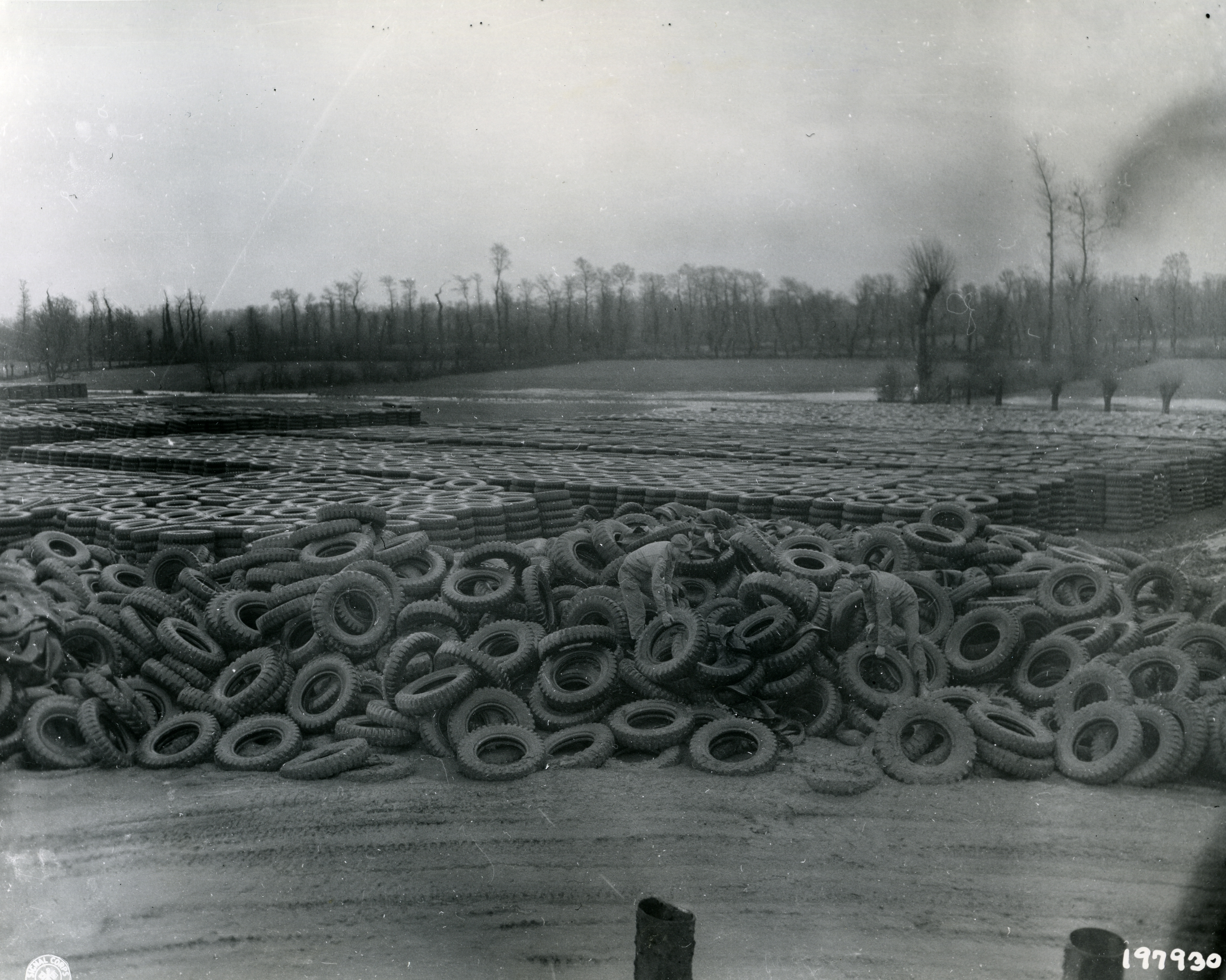
GIs of the 167th Tire Repair Company check the tires to be reconditioned at a depot in Normandy.

COMZ attempted to obtain additional supplies of tires by restoring the local French and Belgian tire industries. This was hampered by a shortage of raw materials, which had to be imported, and the transportation systems and electricity grids, which had to be restored. The first tire made from American synthetic rubber was produced by the Goodrich factory in Paris on 4 January 1945, and by the end of the month it was turning out 4,000 tires per month and the Michelin plant was making 2,000. Meanwhile, since inspections had shown that 40 percent of tire losses were due to preventable causes such as underinflation and overloading, the theater launched a media campaign in the Stars and Stripes newspaper and on the Armed Forces Network radio. The War Department removed the tires from unserviceable vehicles in the United States, and brokered a moratorium on industrial disputes in the synthetic rubber industry to increase production.

The flexibility of motor transport was demonstrated in December when the American armies were struck by the German Ardennes offensive. On 18 December, two days after it began, 274 2½-ton trucks were taken from the White Ball Route and another 258 from the Seine Base Section to move the 82nd and 101st Airborne Divisions to the Ardennes. The following day another 347 trucks were taken from the White Ball Route to help the Third Army respond to the offensive. Semitrailers were withdrawn from the ABC Haul to assist, and by the end of the month 2,500 trucks had been withdrawn from port clearance and short haul duties to handle emergency movements of troops, equipment and supplies. At Liège tanker trucks removed 400,000 US gallons (1,500,000 L) of aviation spirit from threatened fuel depots.

== Railways ==
While motor transport was flexible, it lacked the capacity of rail transport to move large tonnages over long distances. It was upon the railways that the movement of supplies from the ports to the depots ultimately depended. The railway system in northern France was operated by the 2nd Military Railway Service, under the command of Brigadier General Clarence L. Burpee, an Atlantic Coast Line Railroad executive who had commanded the 703rd Railway Grand Division in the North African campaign and the military railways in the Italian campaign.

By the end of September, the 2nd Military Railway Service was responsible for the operation of roughly 2,000 miles (3,200 km) of single-track railway and 2,775 miles (4,466 km) of double-track railway lines. To the northeast of Paris, lines had been opened to the depot areas around Liège and Verdun. The extent of damage to the rail network varied greatly. Most of the bridges across the Seine had been destroyed by Allied bombing or demolished by the retreating Germans, and for a time freight had to be routed through the passenger network in Paris. To the northeast, the Germans had not had sufficient time to carry out widespread demolitions, and the network was largely intact, although some of the double-track lines had single-track sections, and only one bridge in the Liège area was still standing, resulting in a bottleneck that was not rectified until January 1945.

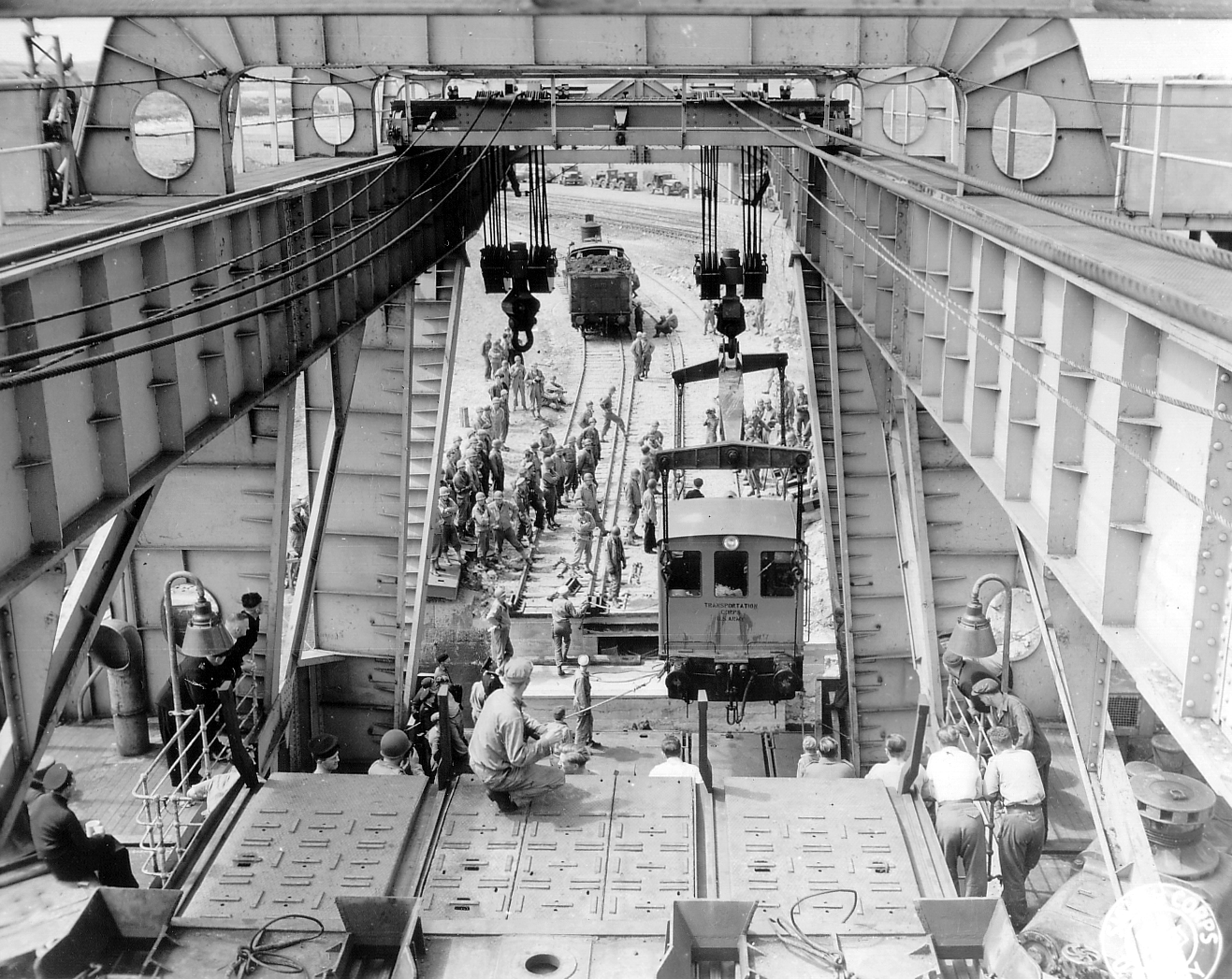
Rolling stock is unloaded from SS Twickenham Ferry. Note the dual gauge track on the mole.

Rehabilitation of the railway system was largely a matter of repairing bridges. The US Army had not developed military railway bridges, so the material for this was of British origin, although some of it was manufactured in the United States. This included British 75-pound (34 kg) flat-bottom tracks; rolled steel joist spans that came in lengths of 17, 21, 27, 31 and 35 feet (5.2, 6.4, 8.2, 9.4 and 10.7 m); a 40-foot (12 m) sectional box girder bridge; and unit construction railway bridges that came in lengths from 50 to 80 feet (15 to 24 m). Five engineer general service regiments were earmarked for railway construction duties, but only two, the 332nd Engineer General Service Regiment and the 347th Engineer General Service Regiment, received special training at the Railway Bridging School at Kings Newton in England. American engineers liked the rolled steel beams that the Germans used. These were manufactured at Differdange in Luxembourg, and after it was liberated in September 1944 it began producing steel beams for the Allies. By the end of December, approximately 3,500 miles (5,600 km) of single track and 5,000 miles (8,000 km) of double track lines were in operation.

The railway system was steadily improved in September and October, easing the burden on the motor vehicles. The railway system northeast of the Seine was in relatively good condition, and had greater capacity than that to the southwest. Two transloading points were established around Paris, at Aubervilliers station for the First Army, and Vincennes station for the Third Army, where trucks could transfer their loads onto trains. Aubervilliers could accommodate 225 railroad cars and load 20 simultaneously, while Vincennes could accommodate 400 and load 115 simultaneously. The task of loading the trains was performed by 300 to 350 French civilians who worked in three eight-hour shifts each day. Except for a crane at Vincennes, there was no provision for loading heavy or bulky items, so only loads that could be manhandled were accepted. Manifests were checked at a regulating point at Trappes south of Paris, and trucks were routed accordingly. Truck to train transfer proved very successful, and Red Ball shipments beyond Paris were discontinued on 20 October, except for some heavy and bulky engineering supplies. In early November, such items began being hauled all the way by train, and the Red Ball Express was discontinued on 16 November, around the same time as the Normandy beaches were closed. In October, 798 freight trains arrived in Paris from Normandy and Brittany, and 999 departed for destinations in the northeast hauling US Army cargo. By November, 23,000 long tons (23,000 t) of supplies was being forwarded northeast of the Seine each day, representing over half the tonnage arriving at the depots.

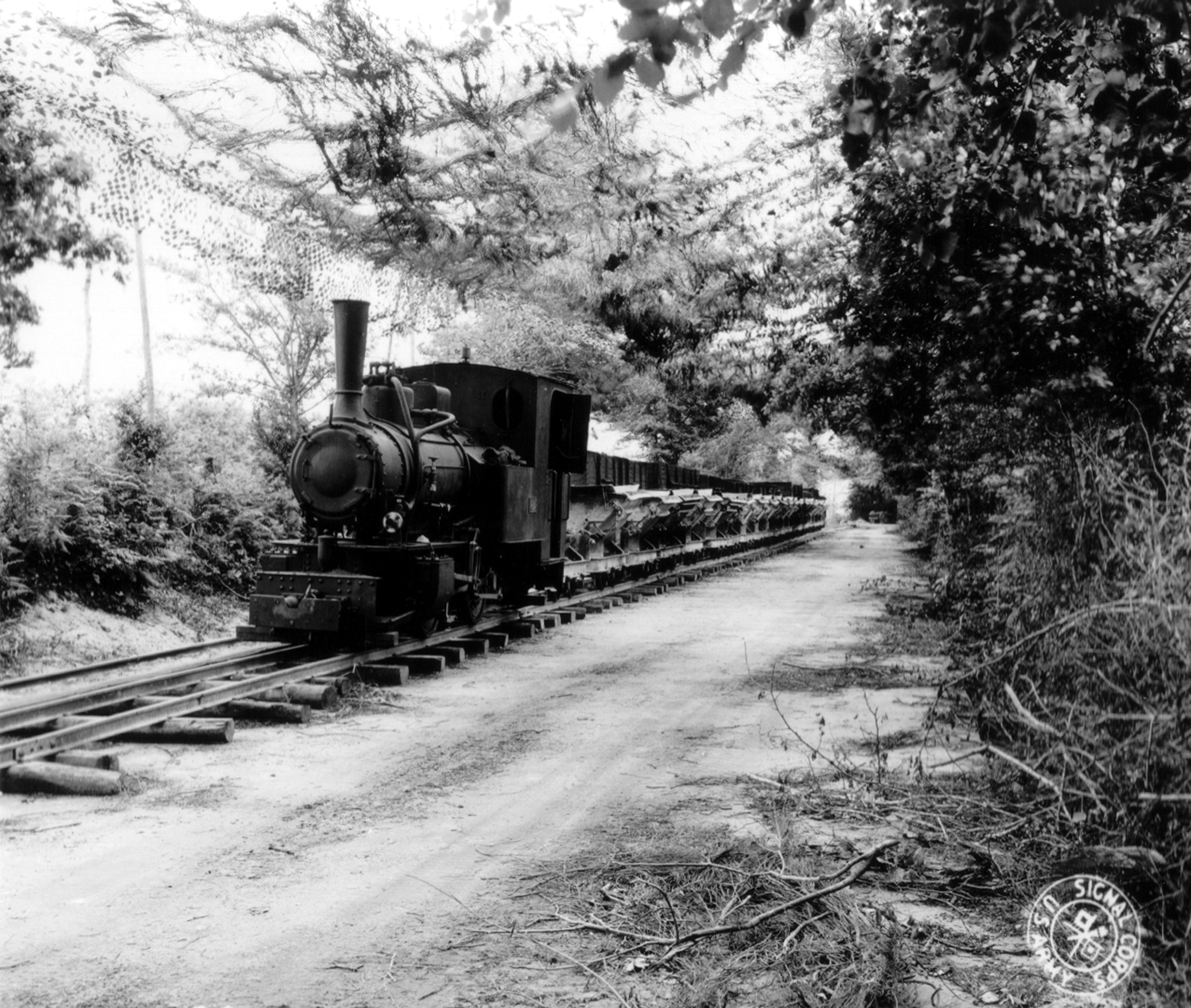
A narrow-gauge Decauville locomotive in Normandy

It was not intended that the railway network would be operated entirely by Allied service personnel for an extended period of time. The plan was that the lines would be progressively handed over to civilian operators once the fighting had passed through and the network was restored. The rapid Allied advance in August and September disrupted this plan, and resulted in the military personnel being spread far more widely and thinly than anticipated. This was complicated by the fact that while the railway operating battalions were formed around cadres drawn from American railroads, not all of their personnel had operating or supervisory experience. Difficulties also arose in dealing with the French civilian operators through differences of language, documentation and operating procedures.

The most important limiting factor affecting the railways was the availability of rolling stock. The Operation Overlord planners had anticipated that much of the French rolling stock would be destroyed by Allied bombing, and that the retreating Germans would take what they could with them. This proved prescient: only fifty serviceable French locomotives were captured southwest of the Seine. It was estimated that the Allied forces would require 2,724 of the large 2-8-0 and 680 of the smaller 0-6-0 type, of which 1,800 and 470 respectively would be for American use, but only 1,358 2-8-0s and 362 0-6-0s were on hand by the end of June 1944.

Due to cutbacks in American locomotive production, the War Department was unable to guarantee delivery of the remaining 2,000 locomotives, and suggested that ETOUSA obtain 450 locomotives that had been loaned to the British. The British refused to hand them over unless the Americans released their coasters. In December, 100,000 deadweight tons (100,000 deadweight tonnes) of coasters was released, and the British agreed to ship 150 locomotives in December, followed by 100 per month thereafter. By the end of the year 1,500 locomotives had been shipped to the continent, and 800 captured French, German and Italian ones had been repaired by French and American mechanics and restored to service.

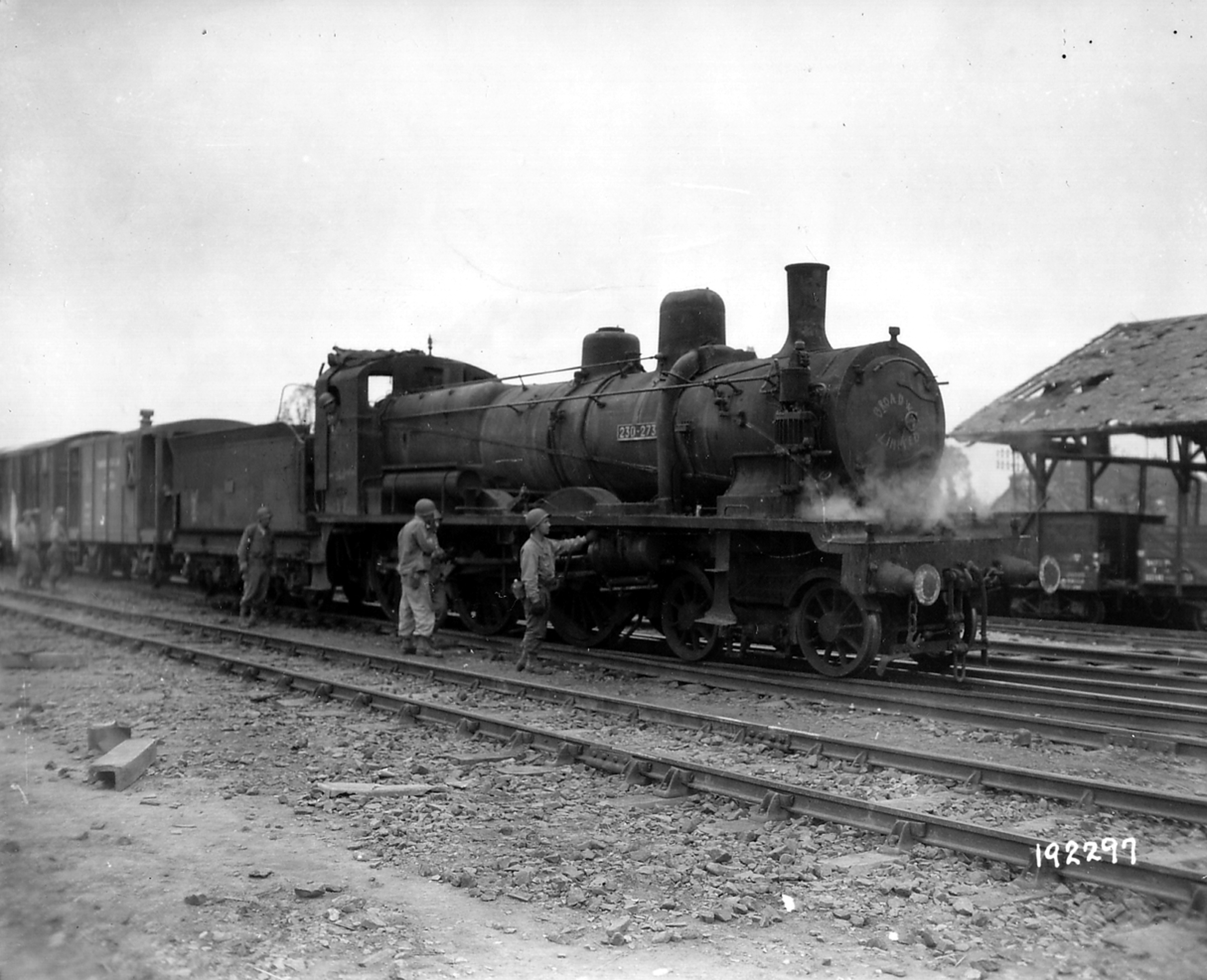
Locomotive number 230-273 at the head of a freight train at Lison station

More than 57,000 railroad cars of various types, including boxcars, flatcars, refrigerator cars and tank cars were shipped to the continent. Of these, some 20,000 had been shipped from the US in the form of knock-down kits and had been assembled in the UK. These were augmented by captured rolling stock. Nonetheless, serious shortages of rolling stock developed in November. Part of the problem was that the armies liked to keep a certain amount of supplies on wheels, using railroad cars as mobile warehouses, but a major factor was a decision to ship bulk supplies directly from the ports to the ADSEC and army depots to reduce port congestion. These depots were primarily points for issuing supplies, with limited unloading and storage capacity, and did not have sufficient resources to classify and segregate bulk supplies. By the end of November there were 11,000 loaded freight cars on the rails northeast of Paris, and ten days later this had increased to 14,000, but the depots could unload only about 2,000 cars per day. This resulted in increased railroad car turnaround times, with many cars taking 20 to 40 days to be unloaded.

COMZ recognized what was happening, and took steps to remedy the situation, but before they could take effect the German Ardennes offensive engulfed the American army. The forward railheads at Malmedy, Eupen and Herbesthal had to be evacuated. Rail shipments abruptly dropped from 50,000 to 30,000 long tons (51,000 to 30,000 t) per day as supplies were held back until the operational situation improved, and trains were used to back haul stocks from depots threatened by the German advance. About 35,000 railroad cars accumulated in forward areas, while supplies piled up at the ports and trains were held idle. Bridges were damaged by Allied and German demolitions and air attacks. The vital railway bridge over the Meuse at Namur was struck by a German air raid on 24 December that set off Allied demolition charges. The bridge had to be rebuilt, and was reopened for traffic on 15 January 1945.

== Air ==
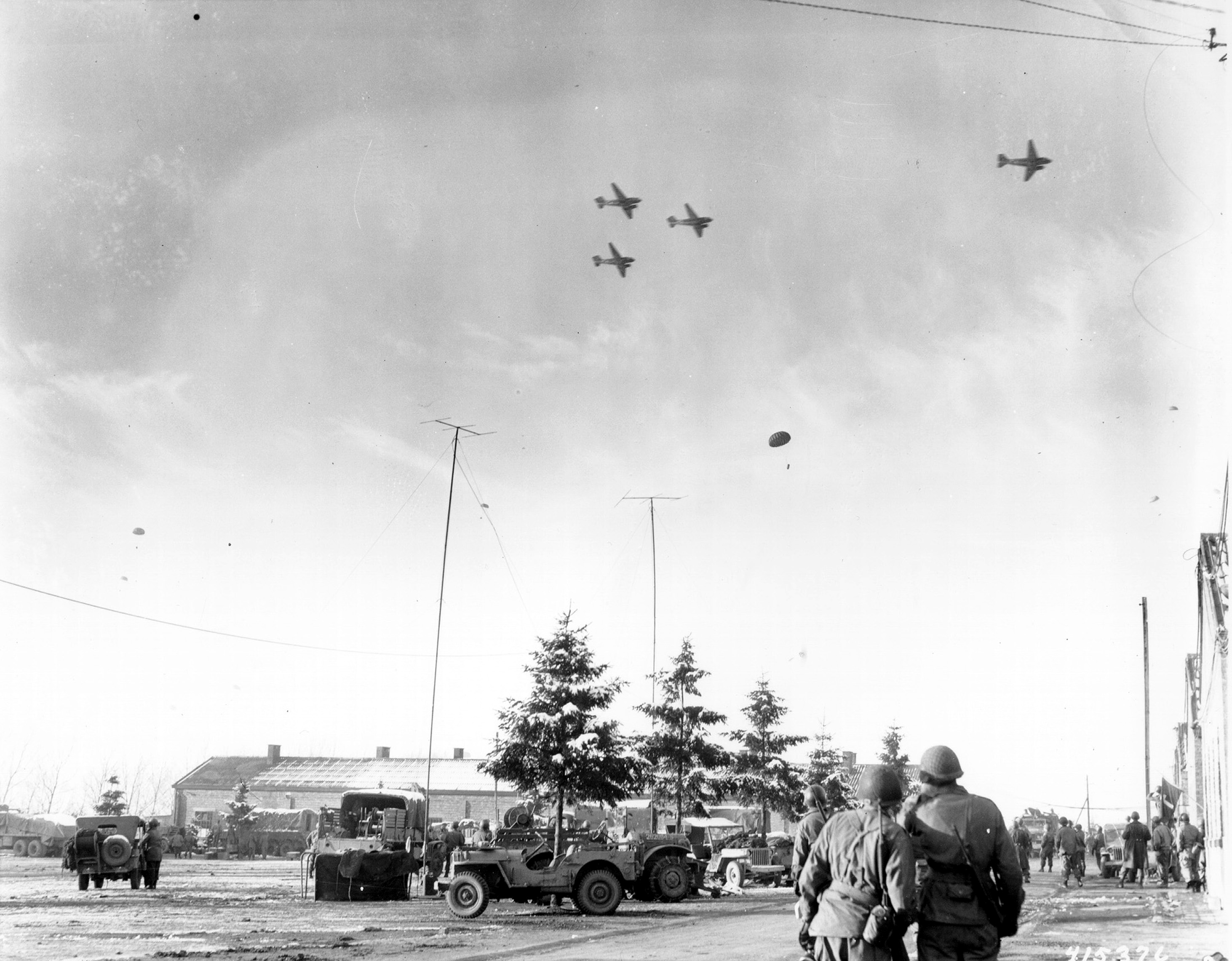
The 101st Airborne Division receives airdropped supplies on 26 December 1944.

Air transport was the least economic form of transport, but in September and October, with road and rail transport unable to supply even the minimum daily requirements of the armies, the Ninth Air Force and ADSEC, air transport was called on to supplement them. In the second week of September, troop carrier and cargo aircraft of the First Allied Airborne Army's IX Troop Carrier Command and No. 46 Group RAF, and converted Consolidated B-24 Liberator bombers managed to deliver 1,000 long tons (1,000 t) per day to airfields at Saint-Dizier, Clastres and Florennes that were made available by the Ninth Air Force. The First Allied Airborne Army units were withdrawn to participate in Operation Market Garden, leaving only the B-24s. Each could carry between 1,600 and 1,800 US gallons (6,100 and 6,800 L) in four bomb bay tanks. In thirteen days of operations commencing on 9 September, 1,601 B-24 sorties delivered 2,589,065 US gallons (9,800,680 L) of gasoline. They were augmented by some British Handley Page Halifax bombers. Part of the planned Market Garden resupply missions were canceled on 22 September, and in the final week of September deliveries averaged a record 1,525 long tons (1,549 t) per day.

The Communications Zone would have liked to have continued to exploit air transport to the maximum extent, but the use of bombers was uneconomical, and they were withdrawn at the end of September. Bad flying weather in October reduced daily deliveries by air to 675 long tons (686 t) per day. In November, 3,227 long tons (3,279 t) were dispatched by air, of which 2,143 long tons (2,177 t) was gasoline. The Third Army complained about this. Gasoline was no longer in short supply; what was required was winter clothing and equipment. It was suspected that gasoline was being shipped simply because it was on hand and easy to handle.

In December, isolated units of the 106th Infantry Division called for air supply, and 150 aircraft were readied, but the mission was not flown due to bad weather around their bases in the UK. Mussions were flown to support the 101st Airborne Division, which was cut off in Bastogne. Between 23 and 27 December, 850 sorties were flown to airdrop supplies, and 61 more were dispatched with gliders, one of which carried a surgical team. As was normal for this sort of operation, some supplies could not be recovered for various reasons, but the 101st Airborne Division considered it successful. An attempt to resupply cut off elements of the 3rd Armored Division was less successful; errors in map reading resulted in 23 of the 29 aircraft dispatched dropping their supplies behind enemy lines, and the rest were either diverted or shot down. A second attempt the following day was canceled due to bad weather.

== Inland waterways ==
Inland water transport had not figured prominently in the Operation Overlord plan because it was felt that the benefit from rehabilitating the waterways would not be worth the effort involved. A policy was therefore laid down that waterways would be used only where the repairs required were minor and when there was a clear necessity for their use. In September such a need arose to restore inland waterways to supply coal to the Paris region in order to relieve pressure on the railways. In November an Inland Waterways Division was established in the Office of the Chief of Transportation. Four waterways were rehabilitated for military use: the Seine, Oise and Rhône rivers, and the Albert Canal.

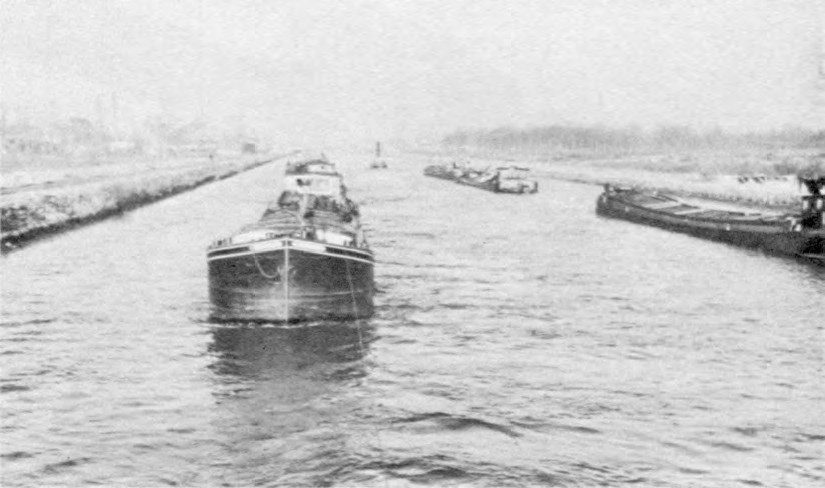
Barges on the Albert Canal

The Oise was restored to supply coal to Paris from the coalfields around Valenciennes. Its rehabilitation was undertaken by the 1057th Port Construction and Repair Group, which repaired several locks and removed 34 obstructions, mostly demolished bridges. The Seine was rehabilitated to bring civil relief supplies to Paris from Rouen and Le Havre. It too was obstructed by sunken bridges and damaged locks. The biggest task was the repair of the locks of the Tancarville Canal, which had been built to allow barges from Le Havre to reach the Seine without having to negotiate the Seine estuary, where there were strong tidal currents. The 1055th Port Construction and Repair Group finished this work in March 1945.

Barge traffic on the Seine was obstructed by a pair of ponton bridges. They had to be opened to allow barges through, but this interrupted motor traffic. At Le Manoir there was a railway bridge built by the British that was too low to permit barge traffic. The bridge was raised in October, but then the river rose in November as the Seine flooded, reducing clearance below the minimum again. The river rose so high it was feared that the bridge would be washed away, and consideration was given to routing the trains hauling British supplies from Normandy via Paris instead. On 25 December the bridge was struck by a tugboat and put out of commission. It was then removed.

The Albert Canal had more direct military use, as it connected Antwerp with the depots around Liège. Its rehabilitation was undertaken jointly with the British, with the Americans responsible for the 50-mile (80 km) section between Kwaadmechelen and Liège. This work was undertaken by the 1056th Port Construction and Repair Group, with assistance from the 332nd and 355th Engineer General Service Regiments and Belgian civilian contractors. Delays in clearing away obstructions in the Albert Canal, notably the demolished Yserburg Bridge at the entrance, caused the opening of the canal to be delayed from 15 to 28 December, by which time there was a backlog of 198 loaded barges. During the winter the canal froze, and sea mules—tiny tugs normally used for towing barges—equipped with bulldozer blades were used as icebreakers. Barges eventually handled half the tonnage discharged at Antwerp. Between December 1944 and July 1945, 1,222,000 long tons (1,242,000 t) of Army cargo was carried by barge on the Albert Canal, and 580,000 long tons (590,000 t) on the French waterways.

== Outcome ==
Although logistical difficulties constituted a brake on combat operations, they were not the only factors that brought the Allied advance to a halt. The American forces also had to contend with rugged terrain, worsening weather and, above all, stiffening German resistance. American forces were widely dispersed and, with the logistical situation preying on his mind, a cautious Hodges ordered his corps commanders to halt when they encountered strong resistance. Patton's intelligence officer, Colonel Oscar W. Koch, warned that the German Army had been defeated, but not routed, and was not on the brink of collapse. He forecast that fierce resistance and a last-ditch struggle could be expected.

As American forces confronted the defenses of the Siegfried Line, priority shifted from fuel to ammunition. The armies made little progress during the fighting in September and October. Although the logistical situation improved even before the opening of Antwerp, the effort to reach the Rhine in November was probably premature. Worsening weather and stubborn German resistance impeded the American advance as much as any logistical difficulties. The German recovery was sufficient to mount the Ardennes offensive in December. This placed immense strain on the American lines of communication, especially the newly opened port of Antwerp. By the new year though, the American transportation system was stronger and more robust than ever, and preparations were underway to support the final drive into the heart of Germany.
