= American logistics in the Northern France campaign =

Supplies services during World War II

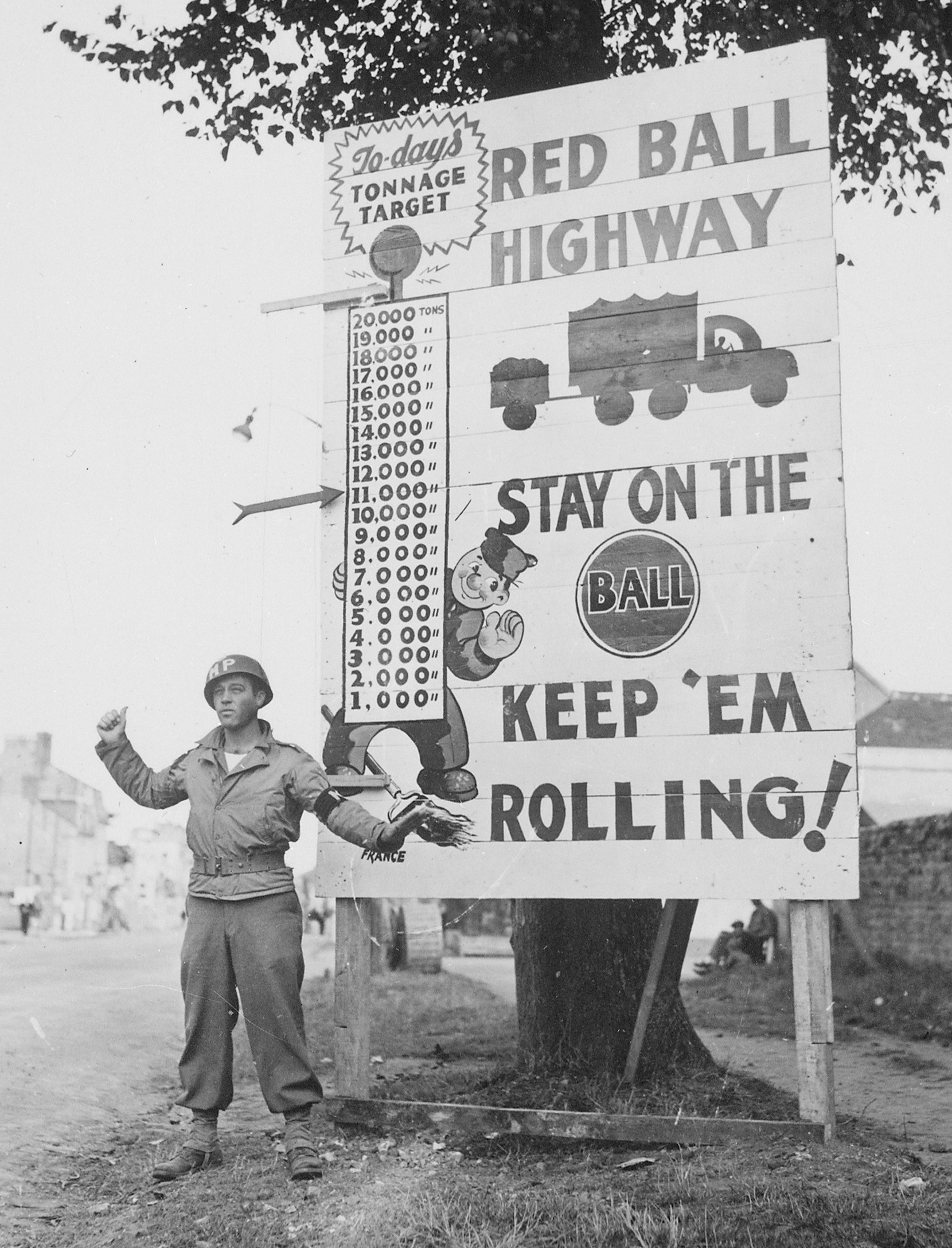
Corporal Charles H. Johnson of the 783rd Military Police Battalion waves on a Red Ball Express motor convoy rushing priority materiel to the forward areas.

American logistics in the Northern France campaign played a key role in the Allied invasion of northwest Europe during World War II. In the first seven weeks after D-Day, the Allied advance was slower than anticipated in the Operation Overlord plan because the well-handled and determined German opposition exploited the defensive value of the Normandy bocage country. The Northern France campaign officially commenced on 25 July, the day First United States Army began Operation Cobra, which saw the breakout from the Normandy lodgment, and ended on 14 September.

After Operation Cobra, the advance was much faster than expected, and the rapid increase in the length of the line of communications threw up unanticipated logistical challenges. The logistical plan lacked the flexibility to cope with the rapidly changing operational situation; the rehabilitation of railways and construction of pipelines could not keep up with the pace of the advance; and resupply by air had limited capacity. Major shortages developed, particularly of petrol, oil, and lubricants (POL).

Motor transport was used as a stopgap. The ADSEC organized the Red Ball Express to deliver supplies from the Normandy area, but there was a shortage of suitable vehicles because of political interference and production difficulties. The tardy delivery of vehicles slowed the training of motor transport unit personnel. As with many other service units, the European Theater of Operations (ETO) was compelled to accept partially trained units in the hope they would be able to complete their training in the UK. Approval for additional relief drivers was also slow, and the US Army's racial segregation complicated personnel assignment. The cost of inadequate training of truck drivers was paid in avoidable damage to vehicles through accidents and poor maintenance.

At critical junctures in the campaign, senior American commanders subordinated logistical imperatives to operational opportunities. Two decisions in particular had long-term and far-reaching effects. The decision to abandon plans to develop the ports of Brittany left only the Normandy beaches and the port of Cherbourg for the maintenance of the American forces. The subsequent decision to continue the pursuit of the defeated German forces beyond the Seine led to the attrition of equipment, failure to establish a proper supply depot system, neglect of the development of ports, inadequate stockpiles in forward areas, and a shortage of POL and ammunition as increased German resistance stalled the American advance. While the logistical system had facilitated a great victory, these problems would be keenly felt in the fighting in the months to come.

== Background ==
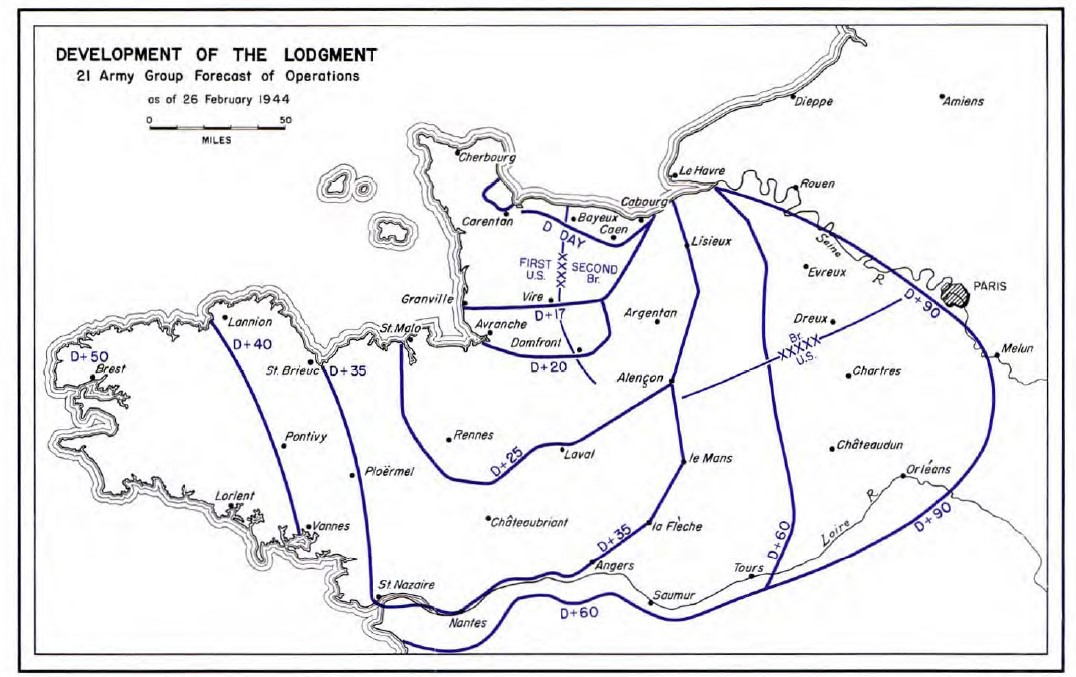
21st Army Group's forecast of Operation Overlord

After the American entry into World War II in December 1941, the European Theater of Operations, United States Army (ETOUSA) was formed, with a Services of Supply (SOS) organization under Major General John C. H. Lee beginning in May 1942. General Dwight D. Eisenhower became the Supreme Commander, Allied Expeditionary Force, on 16 January 1944, and ETOUSA and SOS were combined into a single headquarters, which was increasingly referred to as the Communications Zone (COMZ), although this did not become official until 7 June. To support Operation Overlord, the invasion of Normandy, COMZ activated two subordinate headquarters, the Forward Echelon, Communications Zone (FECOMZ), under Brigadier General Harry B. Vaughan, with Colonel Frank M. Albrecht as his chief of staff, and the Advance Section (ADSEC), under the command of Colonel Ewart G. Plank. ADSEC would take over the operation of base areas, supply dumps and communications from the First Army as it moved forward. In the initial stages of Overlord, ADSEC would be attached to the First Army.

In the first weeks after D-Day, the American forces were supported over the Omaha and Utah Beaches. Although the Mulberry artificial port at Omaha was specially constructed for supplying the invading military forces, it was abandoned after a storm damaged it on 19 June. Logistical support of the American armies on the continent in the longer term depended on the capture and repair of ports. The Overlord plan provided for the rehabilitation of eighteen ports in Normandy and Brittany. This task was assigned to port construction and repair (PC & R) groups. Each had a headquarters and headquarters company with specialists trained in port reconstruction, and a pool of heavy construction equipment with operators, which could be supplemented by engineer troops. Seven ports were expected to be captured and opened in the first four weeks: Isigny-sur-Mer, Cherbourg, Grandcamp, Saint-Vaast-sur-Seulles, Barfleur, Granville and Saint-Malo. Except for Cherbourg, all were small and tidal, and unable to berth vessels with a draft of more than 14 to 15 feet (4.3 to 4.6 m) at high water, which ruled out larger vessels. Much therefore depended on the early opening of Cherbourg, which was expected to occur by eleven days after D-Day (D plus 11), and was expected to handle 6,000 measurement tons (6,800 m^{3}) of cargo per day by D plus 30, and 8,000 measurement tons (9,100 m^{3}) per day by D plus 90, more than the other six ports combined.

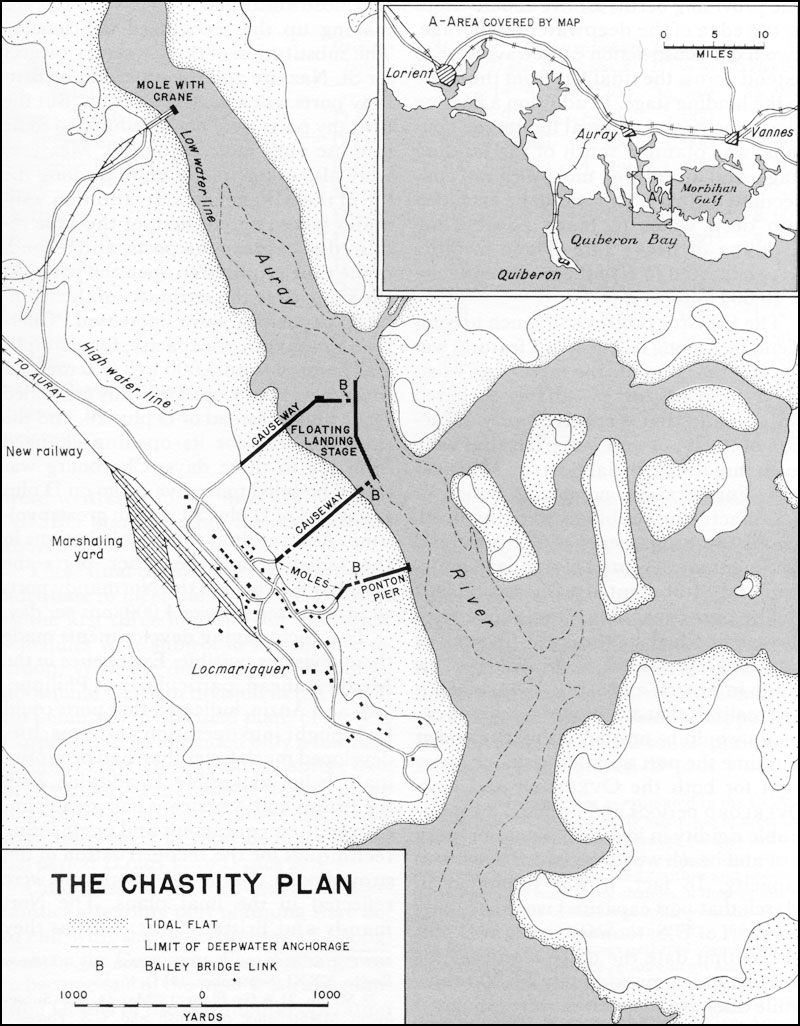
The Chastity plan

Logistical support of the American armies would therefore depend on the ports of Brittany, principally Brest, Lorient and Quiberon Bay. Along with Saint-Malo, they were expected to have a capacity of 17,500 measurement tons (19,800 m^{3}) per day. Of this, 10,000 measurement tons (11,000 m^{3}) per day were expected to come through Quiberon Bay, as it was anticipated that the ports would suffer considerable damage in the fighting, or through German demolitions. Studies indicated that Quiberon Bay had an anchorage sufficient for 200 ships, 3,000 yards (2,700 m) of beaches with the required slope for landing craft, and four minor ports close by where deep-water piers could be constructed. A detailed plan known as Operation Chastity was drawn up to develop the area. Crucially, the Overlord plan called for a one-month pause at the Seine, which was expected to be reached by D plus 90, in order to build up supplies and logistical infrastructure before advancing further. The expectation of an advance at a prescribed rate, while necessary for planning purposes, built inflexibility into a logistics plan that already had little margin for error. Staff studies confirmed that Overlord could be supported if everything went according to plan, but no one expected that it would.

In the first seven weeks after D-Day, the skillful and determined German opposition exploited the defensive value of the Normandy bocage country, and the Allied advance was much slower than the Overlord plan had anticipated. The lodgment area was therefore very much smaller. The nature of the fighting created shortages of certain items, particularly artillery and mortar ammunition, and there were unexpectedly high rates of loss of bazookas, Browning automatic rifles (BARs), and M7 grenade launchers.

== Breakout and pursuit ==
The Northern France campaign officially commenced on 25 July, when the First United States Army began Operation Cobra, which effected a remarkable turnaround in the operational situation, and continued until 14 September. The breakout from the Normandy lodgment was successful, and the US forces threatened to envelop and encircle the German forces. Eisenhower ordered a regrouping of the US forces. The 12th Army Group became active on 1 August. Its headquarters was formed by renaming that of the First United States Army Group, which remained in the UK under the command of Lieutenant General Lesley J. McNair as part of Operation Fortitude, a deception operation aimed at convincing the Germans to maintain forces outside Normandy.

The 12th Army Group consisted of the First Army, commanded by Lieutenant General Courtney Hodges, and the Third Army, under the command of Lieutenant General George S. Patton Jr. Lieutenant General Omar N. Bradley commanded the 12th Army Group, but, until Eisenhower could open his Supreme Headquarters, Allied Expeditionary Force (SHAEF) in France, British General Sir Bernard Montgomery remained in command of all ground forces, British and American, channeling his orders to the US forces through the 12th Army Group, until SHAEF assumed direct command of the ground forces on 1 September.

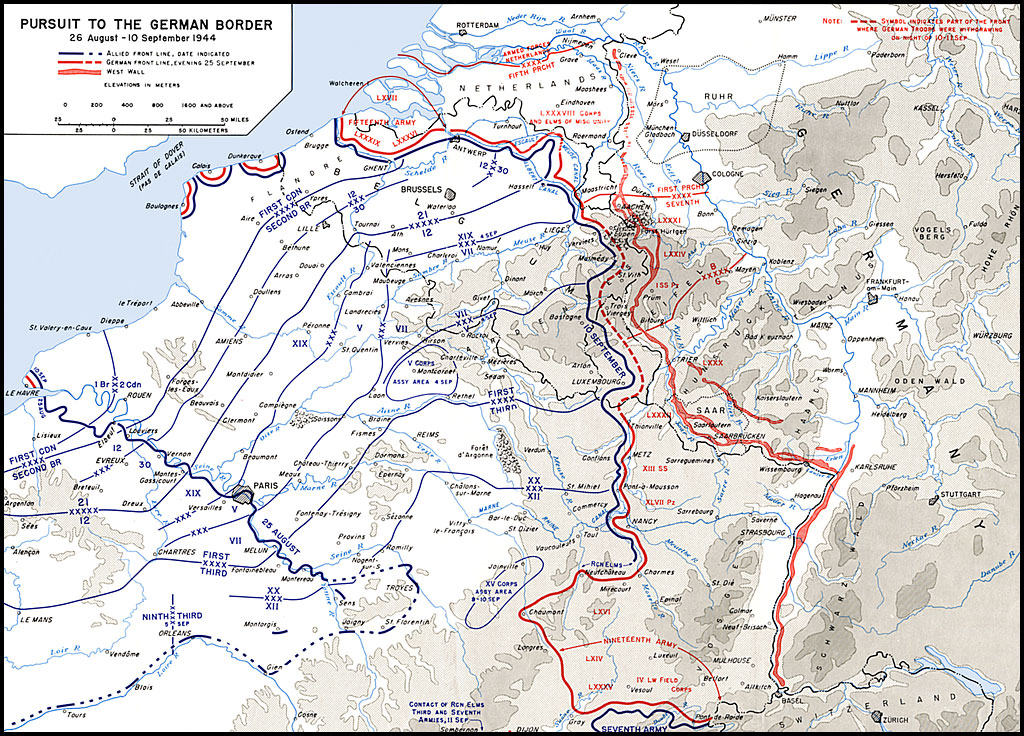
Pursuit to the German border

By 3 August, Patton's Third Army was advancing into Brittany. Bradley fixated on Brest, which was only intended to be a port of reception for troops, and Saint-Malo, a minor port, whereas Patton focused on Lorient and Quiberon Bay. Due to being trained as a cavalryman, Patton conceived operational art—the level of war that sits between the means of tactics and the ends of strategy—very differently from the former infantrymen Bradley and Major General Troy H. Middleton, VIII Corps' commander. When the 4th Armored Division's commander, Major General John S. Wood incorrectly reported that Lorient was too strongly defended to rush, Middleton accepted this assessment.

Bradley ordered Patton to move east, leaving only minimal forces in Brittany. This did not immediately change the plan; Eisenhower informed the Chief of Staff of the United States Army, General George C. Marshall, that "the rapid occupation of Brittany is placed as a primary task, the difference being that in one case we believe that it would rather easily be done and in the other we would have to fight through the defensive line and commit more forces to the job." This was the first in a series of critical decisions that subordinated logistical considerations to short-term operational advantage. In the event, Lorient was not captured, and as a result Quiberon Bay could not be developed because the approaches were covered by German coastal guns at Lorient and on Belle Île. Saint-Malo was secured on 2 September, and Brest was taken on 19 September, but the port facilities were destroyed, and on 3 September SHAEF had abandoned plans to develop Quiberon Bay.

By 24 August, the left bank of the Seine had been cleared, and Operation Overlord was completed. In just 30 days, the Allied forces had conducted an advance that had been expected to take 70. Reaching the D plus 90 line on D plus 79 was not a grave concern, as the Overlord plan had sufficient flexibility to allow for a discrepancy of eleven days. The plan called for a pause on the Seine of at least 30 days, but in mid-August the decision was taken to continue the pursuit of the retreating German forces beyond the Seine. This had even more far-reaching effects than Bradley's decision to re-orient Patton's advance eastwards. Between 25 August and 12 September, the Allied armies advanced from the D plus 90 phase line to the D plus 350 one, moving through 260 phase lines in just 19 days. Although the planners had estimated that no more than 12 divisions could be maintained beyond the Seine, 16 were by mid-September, albeit on reduced scales.

== Base organization ==
ADSEC headquarters opened in Normandy on 16 June. FECOMZ, now under Albrecht's command, opened its headquarters at Château Servigny and Château Pont Rilly near Valognes on 15 July, but ADSEC remained subordinated to the First Army until 30 July. The First Army controlled all US forces in France until 1 August, when the 12th Army Group and the Third Army became active. The facilities at Valognes were greatly expanded, with tents to accommodate 11,000 personnel and 560,000 square feet (52,000 m^{2}) of hutted office space, and special signal facilities installed to enable it to communicate with the UK and US. COMZ headquarters opened at Valognes on 7 August, a month earlier than originally planned, and FECOMZ therefore never operated in its intended role.

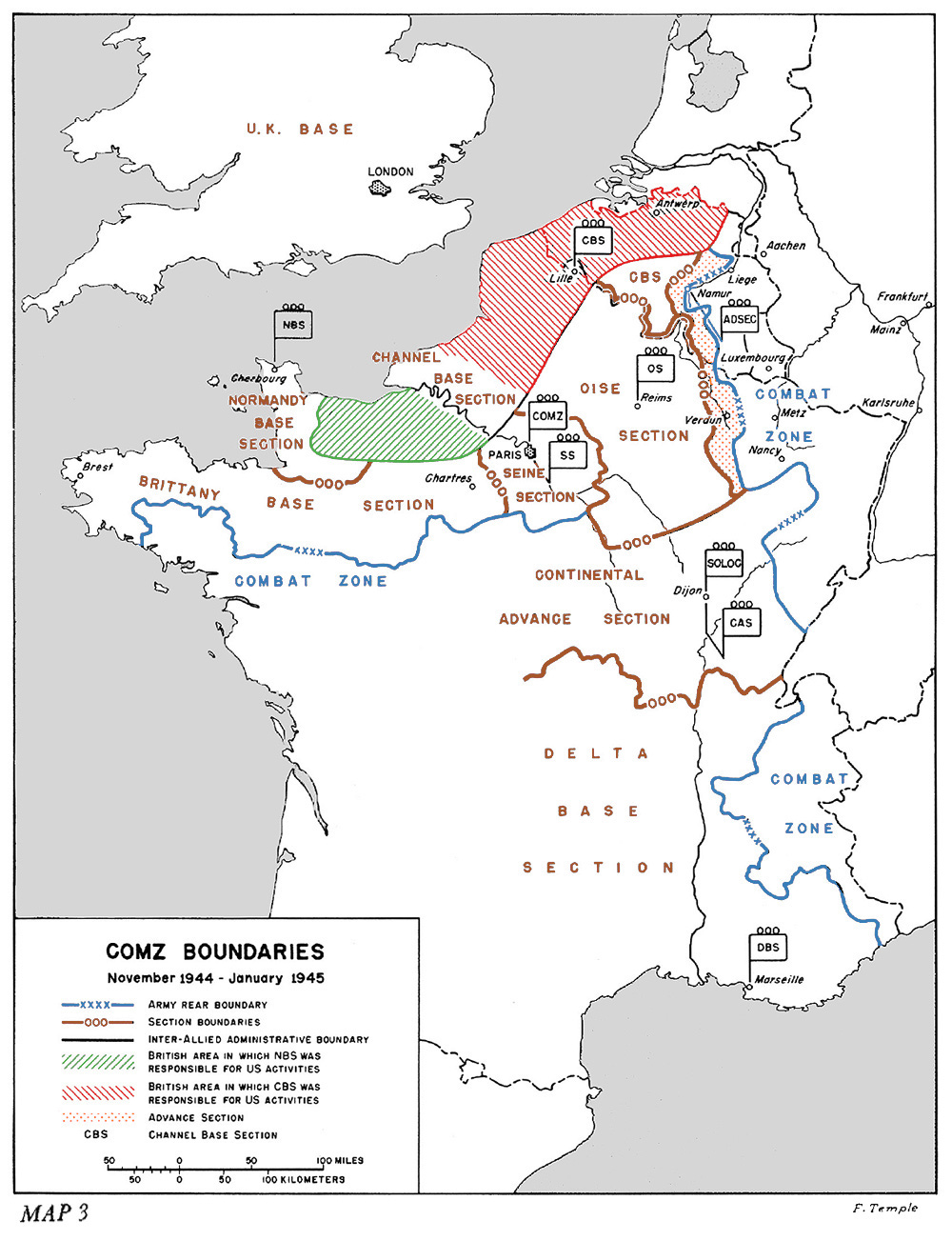
COMZ boundaries November 1944 – January 1945

On 1 September COMZ headquarters began moving from Valognes to Paris. As Paris was the hub of road, rail, cable and inland waterway systems, it soon hosted a concentration of supply depots, hospitals, airfields, railway stations and marshaling yards, and inland waterway offloading points, and as such was the logical and perhaps the only suitable location for COMZ headquarters. The move took two weeks to accomplish, with some of the 29,000 staff moving directly from the UK, and consumed motor and air transport at a time when transportation assets were scarce. COMZ headquarters occupied 167 Paris hotels. Eisenhower was not pleased; the move had been conducted without his knowledge, and contrary to his orders that no Allied headquarters be located in Paris without his specific approval.

On 11 July, ADSEC organized the port of Cherbourg as Area No. 1 under the command of Colonel Cleland C. Sibley, the commander of the 4th Major Port. Ten days later it was redesignated the Cherbourg Command, with Colonel Theodore Wyman Jr. in charge. Over the following week, his headquarters was reinforced with personnel from Base Section No. 3 in England. It was redesignated the Cherbourg Base Section on 7 August, and began taking over the beach area dumps from ADSEC. Finally, on 16 August, it became the Normandy Base Section. Meanwhile, Colonel Roy W. Growler's Base Section No. 1 had arrived at Utah Beach on 3 August, and proceeded to Rennes, where it opened as the Brittany Base Section on 16 August. Brigadier General Leroy P. Collins's Base Section No. 2 moved to Le Mans, where it became the Loire Base Section on 5 September. After Paris was captured, COMZ sent for Brigadier General Pleas B. Rogers's Base Section No. 5, which had been specifically created to administer the Paris metropolitan region. It became the Seine Base Section on 24 August, and occupied another 129 Paris hotels.

Base Section No. 4, under the command of Colonel Fenton S. Jacobs, opened at Fontainebleau on 3 September as the Oise Section, and a Channel Base Section was formed under Colonel Charles O. Thrasher. Before either became operational, it was realized that the staff of each was better suited to the other's mission, so the two swapped names and roles on 15 September. At the same time the engineering section of the Brittany Base Section, which had been organized with the mission of rehabilitating ports, was transferred to the Channel Base Section. With the departure of the sections and most of the personnel from the UK, the sections there became districts, and were consolidated into the UK Base Section, under Vaughan's command.

A key element of a functional logistics system is the establishment of a series of depots. ADSEC was only authorized to maintain stocks sufficient to supply the daily needs of the armies, with its depots replenished by automatic shipment or requisitions from COMZ. The restricted size of the Normandy lodgment area necessarily resulted in a crowding of the installations, and this problem was compounded by the First Army's reluctance to release the dumps under its control until the end of July. The First Army then became the main sufferer from the consequent logistical problems.

Once the breakout from the Normandy lodgment began in earnest, the distances soon became prohibitive for the armies' own transport resources. The Third Army's line of communication ran from the beaches to Laval, 135 miles (217 km) distant, and then to Le Mans, 40 miles (64 km) further away. ADSEC opened a transfer point at Laval on 13 August, and then one at Le Mans a week later. ADSEC hoped to develop Le Mans as a major supply area, but soon it was too far from the front. The transfer point was moved to Ablis, 20 miles (32 km) east of Chartres, where another attempt was made to establish a major depot area. The transfer point remained at Ablis until 7 September, by which time the Third Army was operating beyond the Moselle, 200 miles (320 km) away.

== Petrol, oil and lubricants (POL) ==
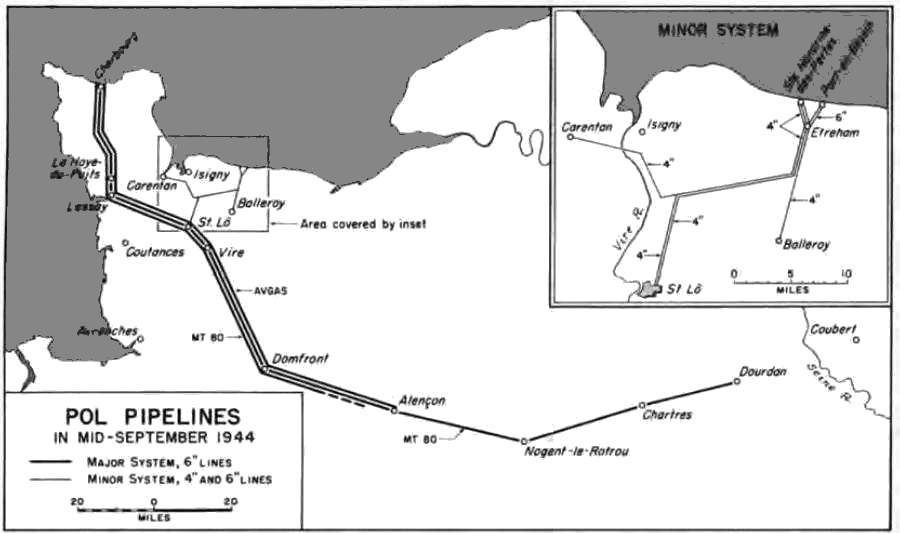
POL pipelines in mid-September 1944

In the initial stages of Overlord, fuel arrived packaged in 5-US-gallon (20 L) jerricans. The jerrican was a German invention copied by the British; in the US Army it supplanted the 10-US-gallon (38 L) drum. The jerrican had convenient carrying handles, stacked easily, and did not shift or roll in storage; it also floated in water when filled with MT80 (80 Octane gasoline). The British version was an exact copy of the German model; the American version, called an Ameri-can by the British, was slightly smaller, with a screw cap onto which a nozzle could be fitted to deal with American vehicles with flush or countersunk fuel tank openings. If a nozzle was not available, the original can with its short spout was much preferred. A US jerrican weighed 10 pounds (4.5 kg) empty, and 40 pounds (18 kg) when filled with MT80, so 56 filled cans weighed one long ton (1.0 t). For Overlord, 11.5 million jerricans were provided. Of these, 10.5 million were manufactured in the UK and supplied to the US Army under Reverse Lend-Lease, while the rest came from the US. Jeeps arrived at the beachhead with full tanks and two jerricans of fuel; weapons carriers and small trucks carried five; 2 1/2-ton trucks carried ten; and DUKWs carried twenty.

The standard operating procedure (SOP) with respect to fuel containers was that empties should be returned and swapped for full ones, but in the early stages of Overlord there were no refilling facilities, and no desire to have the beach supply dumps cluttered with empty jerricans, so the First Army issued an order that empties not be returned. Instead, they went to divisional or corps collection points. The relaxation of the full-for-empty SOP had undesirable effects. So too did the overburdening of Individual riflemen with equipment that they did not immediately need, and which was too often discarded. The demonstration of the Army's prodigality inculcated a culture of wastefulness that had undesirable consequences.

The supply of MT80 used by vehicles and generators was adequate for the first month of Operation Cobra, although the Third Army had only meager reserves and depended on daily deliveries. On 3 August it had 515,000 US gallons (1,950,000 L) on hand, representing 1.3 days of supply. In contrast, the First Army held 10.5 days of supply. In view of this disparity, action was taken to reduce the First Army's excess stocks, and by 19 August they had been reduced to 3.9 days of supply. During the week of 20–26 August, with both armies engaged in pursuit of the retreating Germans, consumption soared, with the First Army burning an average of 501,000 US gallons (1,900,000 L) per day (782,000 US gallons (2,960,000 L) on 24 August alone), and the Third Army using 350,000 US gallons (1,300,000 L). By 3 September, both armies reported that they had less than a day's supply on hand.

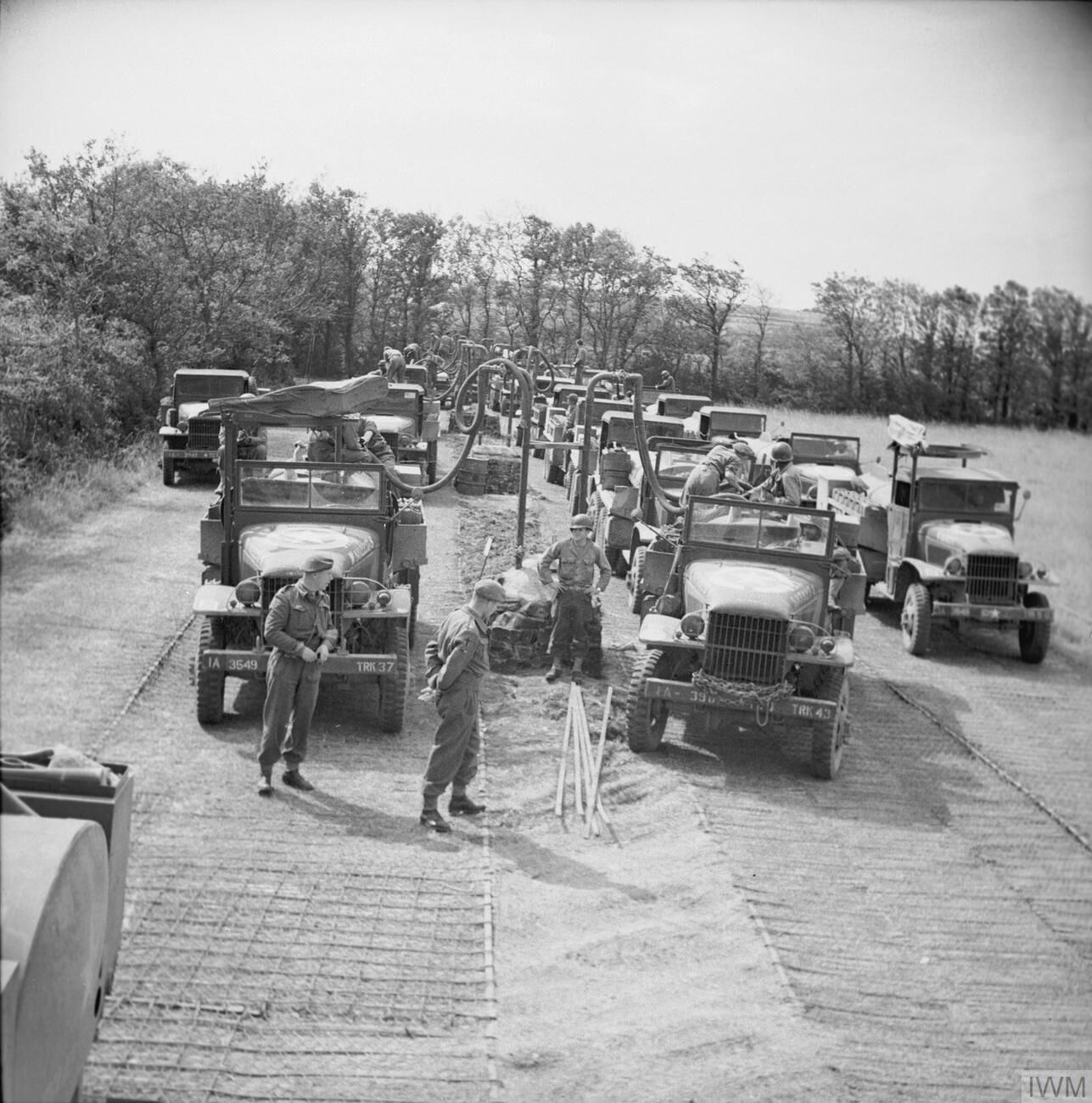
Trucks taking on fuel

Meanwhile, as the distances increased so too did the difficulty involved in delivering POL. The Third Army began rationing MT80. On 28 August, it reported that receipts had fallen 97,510 US gallons (369,100 L) short of its 450,000-US-gallon (1,700,000 L) requirement. Deliveries fell to 31,975 US gallons (121,040 L) on 30 August, and 25,390 US gallons (96,100 L) on 2 September. One additional source was captured fuel; 115,000 US gallons (440,000 L) was captured at Châlons-du-Maine on 29 and 30 August, and the Third Army made use of 500,000 US gallons (1,900,000 L) of captured fuel during the pursuit. It also commandeered the fuel that COMZ trucks needed for their return journeys, leaving convoys stranded. Yet at no stage was fuel actually in short supply; on 19 August the depots in Normandy held 27,000,000 US gallons (100,000,000 L) of gasoline, equivalent to twelve days of supply. The problem was one of distribution.

The preferred method of moving bulk POL was through pipelines. Although Cherbourg's cargo-handling facilities had been damaged or destroyed, its POL-handling facilities were largely intact. The 5,000,000-US-barrel (600,000,000 L) storage tanks were cleaned to allow them to hold MT80 instead of fuel oil. It took four weeks for the Allied Naval Forces to clear away the underwater obstacles and put the Digue de Querqueville, which had been the largest POL offloading point in the continent before the war, back into operation. The first elements of what was known as the "Major System" were installed in the form of 6-inch (15 cm), 8-inch (20 cm) and 12-inch (30 cm) pipelines from the Digue de Querqueville to the storage tanks.

Cherbourg handled its first POL on 26 July, and the Major System pipeline commenced operation six weeks behind schedule. On 31 July it reached La Haye-du-Puits, where two 15,000-US-barrel (1,800,000 L) storage tanks were erected. Originally, it was supposed to head south to Avranches and then to Rennes in support of operations in Brittany, but as a result of Bradley's 3 August decision, the pipeline was directed southeastward to Saint-Lô, which was reached on 11 August. A decanting point where jerricans were filled with bulk fuel was opened at La Haye-du-Puits on 1 August that was manned by three gasoline supply companies and a service company that decanted 250,000 US gallons (950,000 L) per day. On 19 August, when ADSEC turned them over to the Normandy Base Section, there were ten POL dumps and five decanting points.

A workforce of over 7,200 troops and 1,500 prisoners of war was engaged in the construction of the Major System pipeline. Units involved included the 358th, 359th and 368th Engineer General Service Regiments and a battalion of the 364th Engineer General Service Regiment, and nine petroleum distribution companies. Through lack of experience, the engineers were sometimes careless with the couplings or left gaps that permitted the entry of animals or into which troops threw C-ration cans. In the attempt to push the pipeline ahead as quickly as possible, the engineers did not always take the time to break through hedgerows or clear minefields, and lines were often laid along road shoulders, where they were subject to damage by motor vehicles. The line was also subject to acts of sabotage by German sympathizers, and black marketeers sometimes punched holes in it to steal fuel.

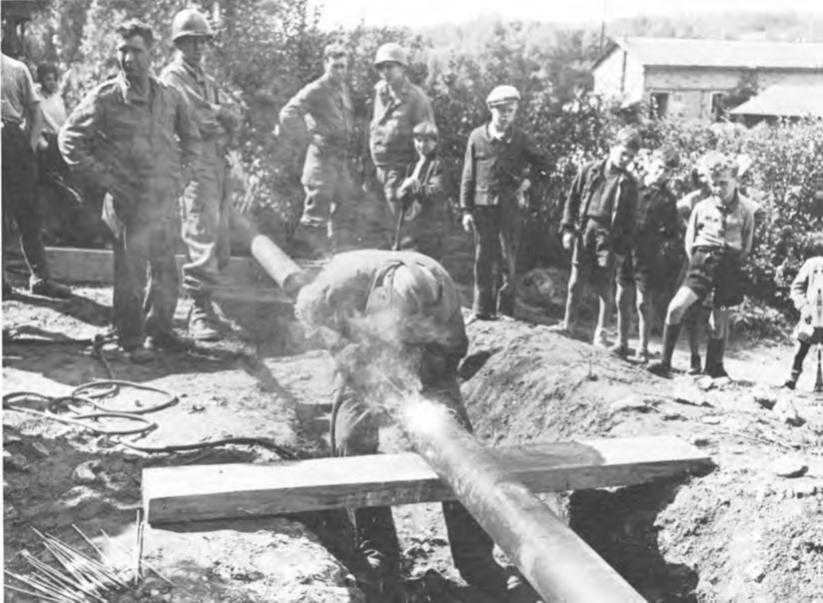
Welding a section of POL pipeline

By the end of August, one Major System MT80 pipeline had reached Alençon, another was at Domfront, and an avgas pipeline had nearly reached Domfront, but breaks in the line forced truck units to draw MT80 from Saint-Lô. Up to this point the pipeline had overriding priority, but its construction required the railway system to deliver 500 to 1,500 long tons (510 to 1,520 t) of pipes, tanks, pumps and fittings each day. By mid-September, the pipeline's priority was downgraded, and pipeline construction units had to rely on motor transport instead of rail transport, limiting progress to 7 to 8 miles (11 to 13 km) per day. The pipeline reached Coubert on 6 October, and there it remained until January 1945.

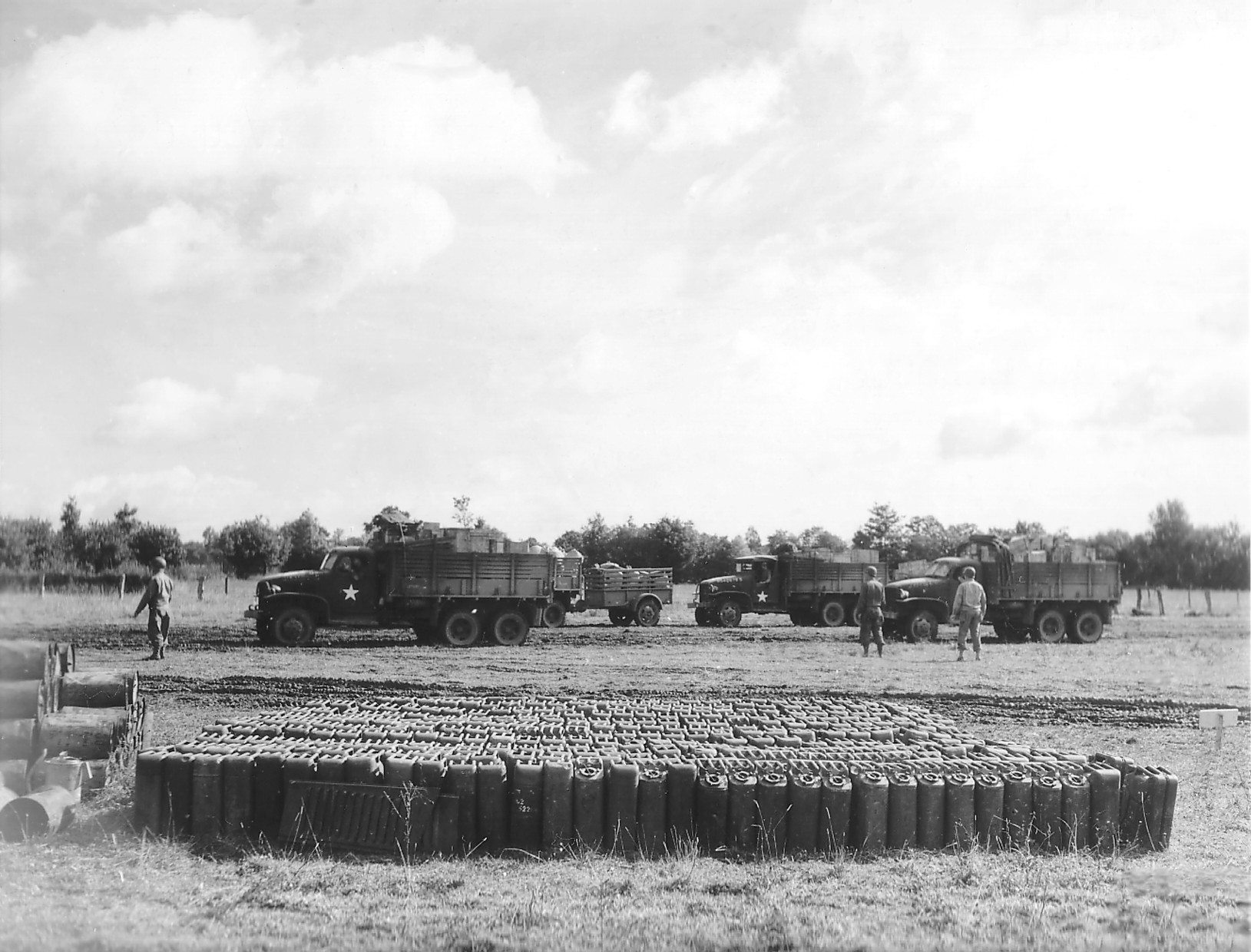
A jerrican depot

The COMZ salvage effort was concentrated under the 202nd Quartermaster Battalion, which had three collecting and three repair companies. Combat units collected their own salvage, which was picked up at the truckheads and hauled to the salvage depots in returning ration trucks. The repair companies were static, but had mobile equipment maintenance units that visited the forward areas. The collecting companies combed the rear areas looking for abandoned equipment. By August, a shortage of jerricans had become a critical supply problem. Over 2 million jerricans had been discarded or abandoned in Normandy. Major General Robert McG. Littlejohn, the Chief Quartermaster, noted that the salvage companies and gasoline supply companies were ignoring the thousands of jerricans that littered the roads in the Le Mans area until he specifically ordered their collection. An even greater problem was the huge stockpiles of empty jerricans that had been abandoned at dumps when the units manning them had displaced forward.

Littlejohn appointed Colonel Lyman R. Talbot, the chief of the COMZ Petroleum and Fuel Division, as his special POL liaison officer at ADSEC, with special responsibility for collecting jerricans. Since it was easier to move bulk POL to the jerrican dumps than to move the empty jerricans to the bulk POL, Littlejohn and Talbot established temporary filling points at the disused dumps. Editorials urging that discarded cans be handed in were run in Stars and Stripes, the United States Information Service ran appeals in the news media, and French civilians, including children, were employed in the search for discarded jerricans. By the end of December, over one million discarded or abandoned jerricans had been recovered.

Efforts were made to procure more jerricans. The British War Office agreed to supply 221,000 per month, about half what Littlejohn estimated was required. Orders were placed in the United States, but production there had ceased, and efforts to restart it were hampered by a shortage of manpower. Shipping was also a problem, as the tonnage allocated to quartermaster items had been reduced, and Littlejohn needed shipping space for winter clothing. Jerricans had to be sent as filler or deck cargo. The number of decanting sites was reduced to minimize the reserves of cans. Finally, due to the shortage of jerricans, each army was forced to accept part of its POL allocation in bulk, or in 55-US-gallon (210 L) drums. These weighed 412 pounds (187 kg) when filled with gasoline, and were disliked by the combat troops, who had little access to handling equipment at their forward dumps, and regarded them as inconvenient and dangerous.

== Railways ==
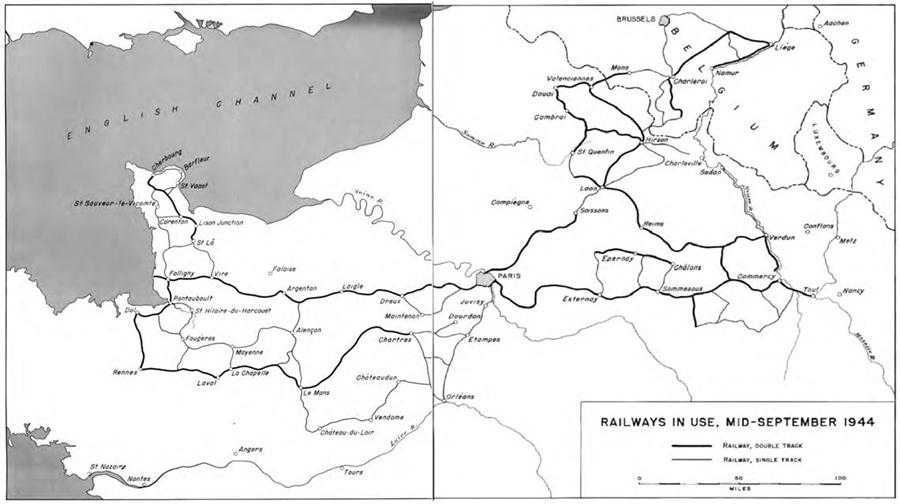
Railway lines in use in mid-September 1944

The Overlord planners intended to use rail transport for most long-distance haulage. France had a good rail network, with nearly 36,500 miles (58,700 km) of single- and double-track lines. Like most European railway systems, the rolling stock was lightweight and loading and unloading facilities were limited, so rolling stock coming from the United States had to be specifically designed and built for the purpose of operating on the continent. Railway units were scheduled to arrive at Cherbourg, but the delay in capturing and then opening the port meant that the first units arrived over the beaches. The first rolling stock, two 150-horsepower (110 kW) diesel locomotives and some flatcars, arrived on tank landing craft (LCT) that were unloaded over Utah Beach on 10 July.

Later that month the Seatrain railroad car transporter ships USAT Seatrain Texas and Seatrain Lakehurst began delivering rolling stock to Cherbourg. The port was still too badly damaged for them to be berthed, so they were unloaded in the stream, with rolling stock transferred to barges that were unloaded on the shore with the aid of mobile cranes. While the seatrains brought in the heavier equipment like locomotives and tank cars, most rolling stock arrived on tank landing ships (LSTs) fitted with rails. By 31 July 1944, 48 diesel and steam locomotives and 184 railway cars had arrived from the United Kingdom, and another 100 steam locomotives, 1,641 freight cars, and 76 passenger cars had been captured.

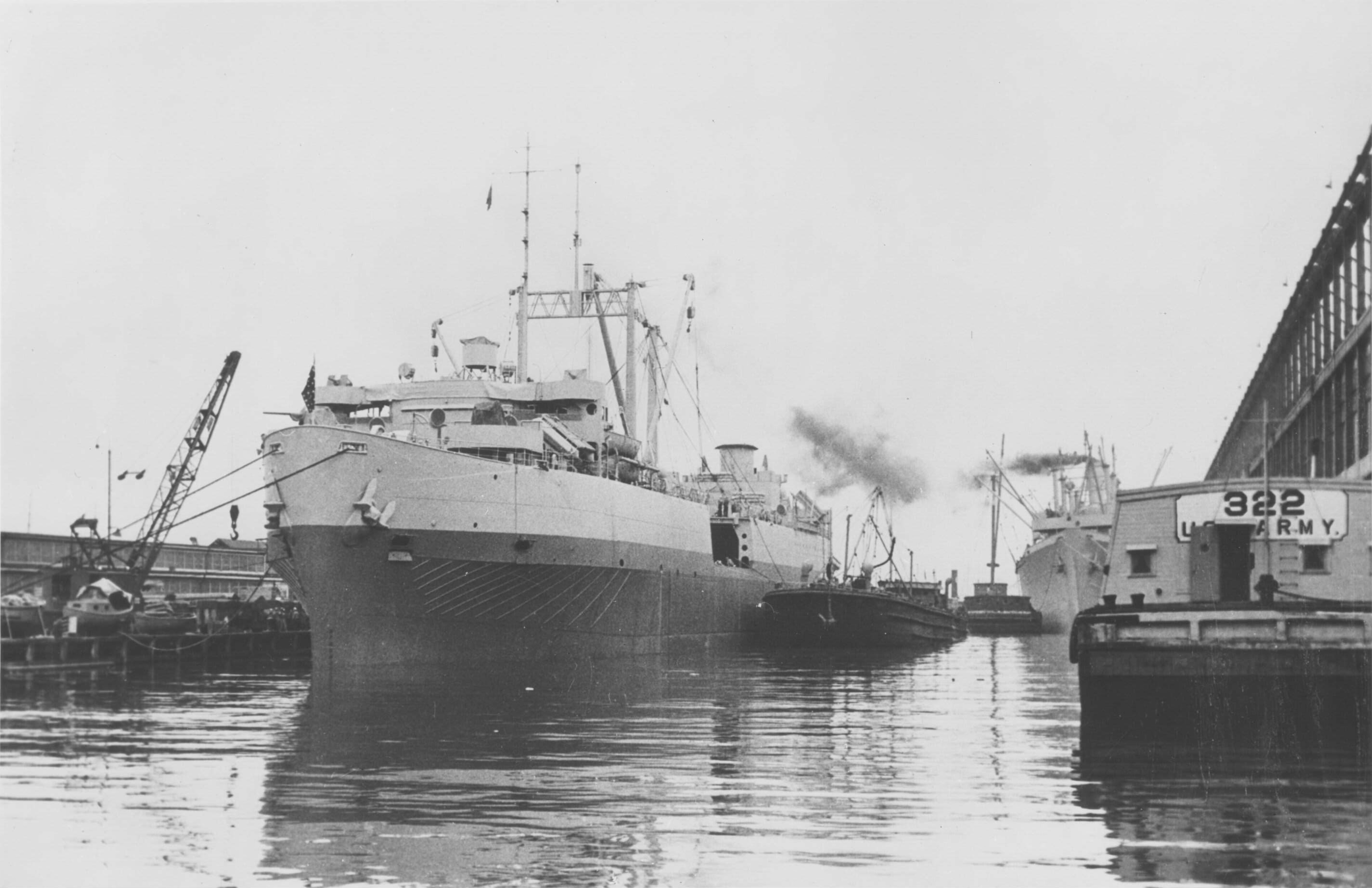
The transport USAT Seatrain Texas

The commander of the 2nd Military Railway Service, Brigadier General Clarence L. Burpee, arrived in Normandy on 17 June, and by the end of July the 707th Railway Grand Division had the 720th, 728th and 729th Railway Operating Battalions and the 757th Shop Battalion operational. French civilian railway workers were employed whenever possible. Railway operations commenced in early July. Major General Frank S. Ross, the European Theater of Operations (ETO) Chief of Transportation, rode the line from Cherbourg to Carentan in a jeep equipped with flanged wheels. Immediately after Operation Cobra began, the 347th Engineer General Service Regiment was withdrawn from its work on the port of Cherbourg and set to work rehabilitating the railway lines, which had been badly damaged by the Allied Air Forces during earlier aerial interdiction bombing. It started by repairing the masonry bridge over the Vire River on the Saint-Lô line, constructing a timber trestle bridge to replace a missing span. At Coutances, it replaced a missing span of a viaduct bridge. Reconstruction of the marshaling yards at Saint-Lô was a major task, as they had been almost completely destroyed.

On 12 August, the Third Army asked for the line to Le Mans to be opened, with 12,000 long tons (12,000 t) of ammunition and POL to be delivered over the next three days. The main line eastward from Vire to Argentan was still in German hands, and the one southward to Rennes and then eastward to Le Mans could not be restored quickly because major bridge reconstruction tasks were required at Pontaubault and Laval. Instead, a temporary route was found using a series of secondary lines while the main line was being repaired. Even this required some major bridge reconstruction work, including an 80-foot (24 m) single-track bridge at Saint-Hilaire-du-Harcouët. Elements of eleven engineer general service regiments worked on the lines simultaneously. When Major General Cecil R. Moore, the ETO Chief Engineer, flew over the Saint-Hilaire bridge site at 18:00 on 15 August, he saw a sign on the ground in white cement that read: "Will finish at 20:00." The first train loaded with POL left Folligny at 19:00, crossed the bridge at around midnight, and, after many delays, rolled into Le Mans on 17 August. Thirty more trains followed at half-hour intervals.

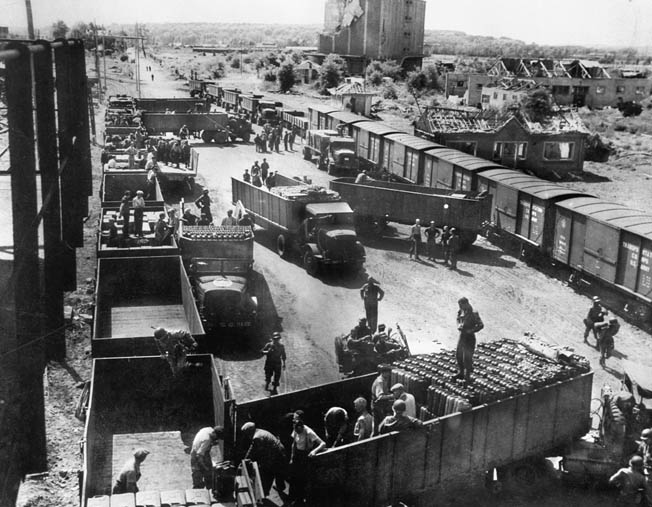
Loading packaged POL onto a train

With only single-track lines in use, the lines between Avranches and Le Mans soon became congested, and a shortage of empty freight cars developed. The rail yards at Folligny and Le Mans were badly damaged, and considerable reconstruction work was required. Getting the main line east of Rennes in use required the repair of the bridge at Laval, which was completed by the end of the month. By mid-August, the main line to Argentan was in Allied hands. Its reconstruction was given a high priority, and it was in use by the end of the month. Beyond Chartres, the lines were badly damaged, as the Allied Air Forces had given particular attention to interdicting German lines of communications across the Seine. By the end of August, 18,000 men, including 5,000 prisoners of war, were working on railway reconstruction. An American train reached the rail yards at Batignolles in Paris on 30 August by using a circuitous route, but its use was initially restricted to hospital trains, engineer supplies, and civil affairs relief. Nearly all the Seine bridges had been destroyed, and by 4 September only two or three trains per day navigated the Paris bottleneck to points beyond. Dreux and Chartres remained the forward railheads of the First and Third Armies respectively.

Beyond the Seine, the railway network was more extensive, and damage was much lighter, as it had not been the target of air attack nearly as much as the railways in the Normandy lodgment area, and the Germans had not had time to destroy them. The main problem was shortage of rolling stock. Transfer points were established in the Paris area where supplies were transferred to railway cars, taking some of the burden off the hard-pressed motor transport resources. By mid-September, 3,400 miles (5,500 km) of track had been rehabilitated and over forty bridges had been rebuilt. Lines had been opened north of Paris to Namur and Liège in Belgium to support the First Army, and eastward to Verdun and Conflans-en-Jarnisy to support the Third Army. By mid-September, the railways were hauling 2,000,000 ton-miles (2,900,000 tkm) per day, but rail tonnages north of the Seine averaged just 5,000 short tons (4,500 t) per day.

== Motor transport ==
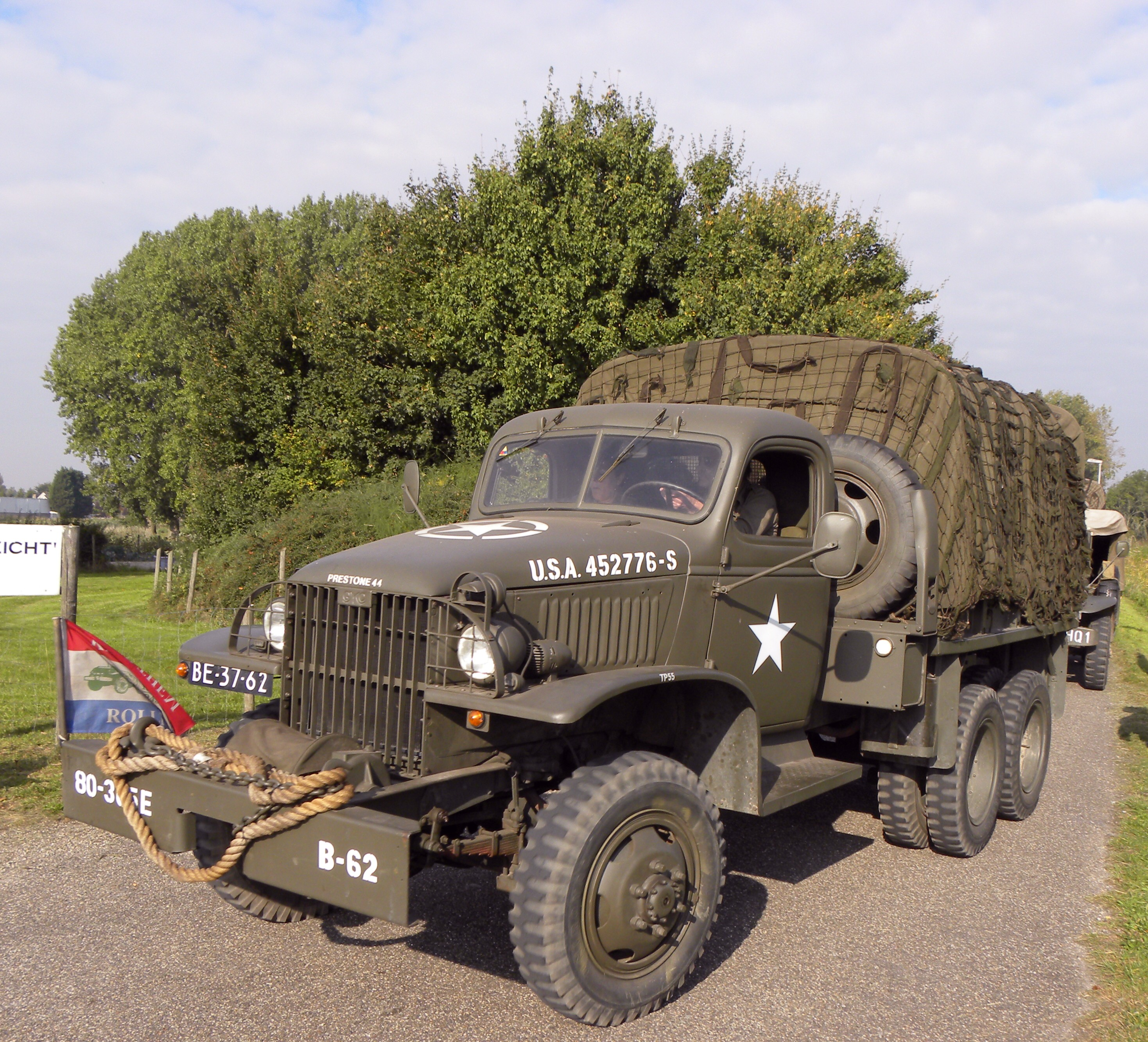
A 2½-ton 6×6 truck

With the railways and pipelines unable to keep up with the pace of the advance, the breakout and pursuit from Normandy placed a heavy burden on ADSEC's Motor Transport Brigade. Yet even before Operation Cobra began, COMZ estimated that there would be a shortage of 127 truck companies by D plus 90. This was a consequence of decisions made in the planning stages of Overlord. COMZ had estimated that 240 truck companies were required, but only 160 were approved in November 1943.

ETOUSA was only partly responsible for this. In peacetime, the American motor vehicle industry had produced about 600 heavy-duty trucks (defined as four-ton vehicles or greater) a month, but in July 1943, the Army Service Forces (ASF) ordered 67,000 to be produced in 1944. The Truman Committee considered this wasteful, unnecessarily reducing the number of civilian trucks that could be built. Despite the adverse political pressure, the Army pressed on with the production program, but only 2,788 heavy-duty trucks came off the assembly lines in January 1944, half the required rate. There was a shortage of forgings and castings for heavy-duty axles, engines and transmissions, and it took time for new producers to tool up.

Ross wanted two-thirds of the ETO's requested 160 companies equipped with the ten-ton (11 m^{3}) semi-trailer, which was especially suitable for long-distance haulage, with the rest equipped with 2½-ton 6×6 trucks for shorter inter-depot movements and clearance of railheads, but by the end of March 1944, ETO had only 66 ten-ton semi-trailers instead of the 7,194 it had requested, and none of the 4,167 four- or five-ton truck tractors. In April, the War Department attempted to meet the requirements by taking hundreds of trucks of miscellaneous types from the ASF, Army Ground Forces and Army Air Forces in the United States, and the ASF diverted 1,750 four- and five-ton truck tractors and 3,500 five-ton semi-trailers earmarked for the Ledo Road project in Burma to the ETO.

Red Ball and Red Lion express routes, 20 September

The tardy delivery of vehicles affected the training of motor transport unit personnel. As with many other service units, the ETO had been compelled to accept partially trained units in the hope they would be able to complete their training in the UK. The late arrival of vehicles meant that this training could not get under way until May 1944. In August 1943 the Transportation Corps recommended that each truck company be allocated an additional 36 drivers, bringing them up to two per vehicle and 96 per company, thereby allowing the trucks to be operated around the clock. ETOUSA disapproved this, which it regarded as unnecessary, but the Transportation Corps persisted, and in early 1944 Lee had approved the proposal.

But by this time the War Department had established a troop ceiling for the ETO, and would not provide the additional personnel without corresponding cuts elsewhere, so the 5,600 men to provide an additional 40 drivers for 140 companies had to be obtained from other SOS units. Lee sternly warned that he would not countenance this being used as an excuse to rid units of undesirables. Whether this admonition worked is debatable, but insufficient numbers of personnel were provided, so in May 1944, fourteen African-American truck companies had their personnel transferred to other African-American units. The US Army was racially segregated, so the intention was to replace them with Caucasian personnel, but the numbers were not made available. Instead, two engineer general service regiments were temporarily converted to truck units. The cost of inadequate training of truck drivers would be paid in avoidable damage to vehicles through accidents and poor maintenance.

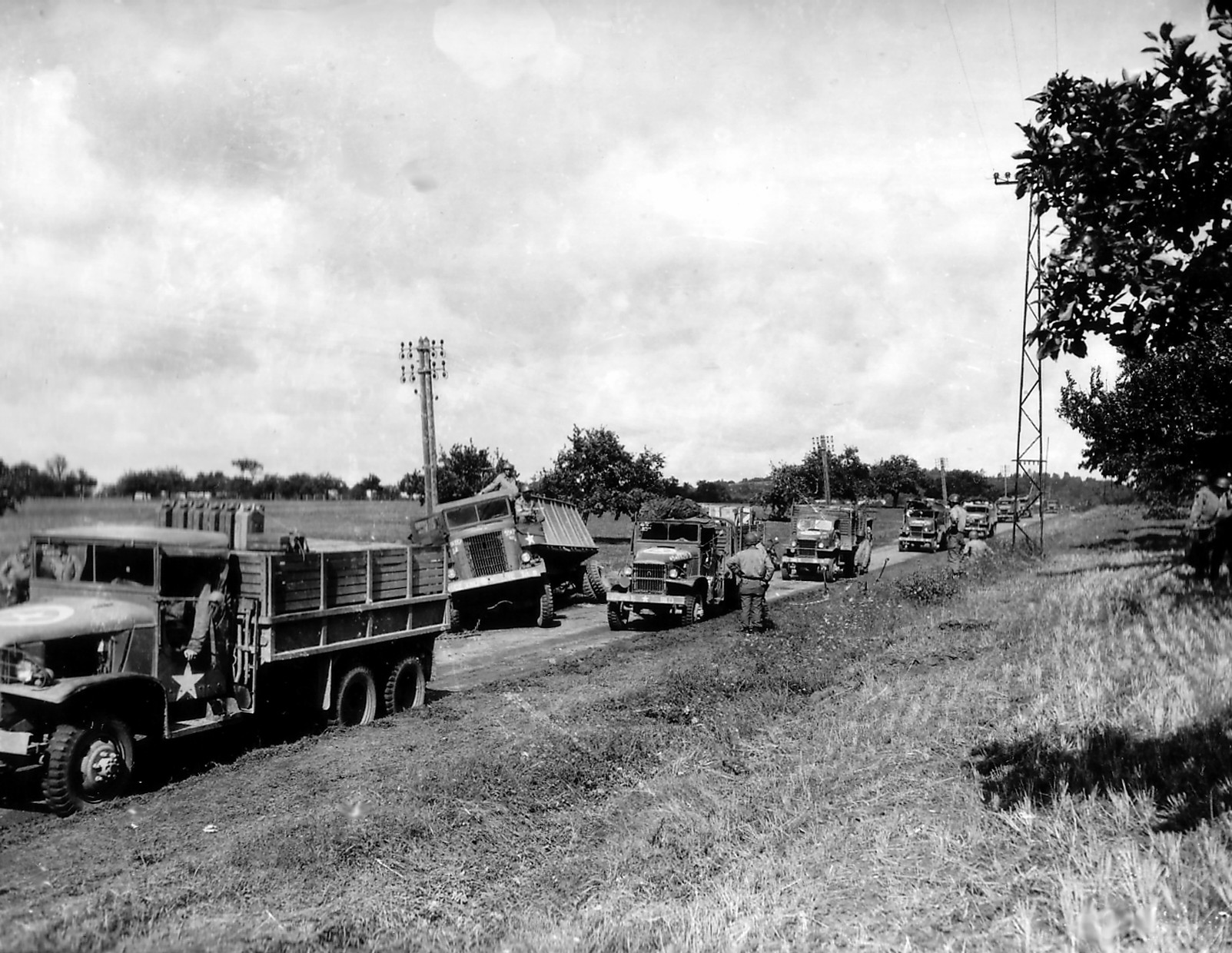
Red Ball Express convoy passes a broken-down vehicle.

On 10 August, two companies of 45-ton tank transporters were converted to cargo carriers. A few days later, the 55 truck companies equipped with 2 1/2-ton 6×6 trucks were each given ten additional trucks, and three British truck companies were borrowed from the 21st Army Group. The situation became acute with the decision to continue the pursuit across the Seine. COMZ estimated that this would require 100,000 long tons (100,000 t) of supplies (excluding POL) to be delivered to the Dreux-Chartres area by 1 September. Of this, the railways could deliver only 18,000 long tons (18,000 t), leaving 82,000 long tons (83,000 t) to be hauled by the Motor Transport Brigade. It was immediately realized that this would require an extraordinary effort.

The solution adopted was the Red Ball Express, a term appropriated from the railways. The plan called for a one-way highway loop running around the clock. This expedient had never been attempted before and the procedures for operating it were untried. Routes were marked with Red Ball markers. Red Ball convoys commenced on 25 August, and reached their peak on 29 August when 132 companies with 5,958 vehicles delivered 12,342 long tons (12,540 t) of supplies. They moved at a maximum speed of 25 miles per hour (40 km/h) with 60 yards (55 m) between each vehicle and no overtaking was permitted. An hourly ten-minute break was taken at ten minutes before the hour. Opposition from the Luftwaffe was absent, permitting the use of lights at night. In practice, convoy discipline, especially with regard to speed limits, was not always followed. Without adequate numbers of military police to control the routes, it proved impossible to reserve them for the exclusive use of the Red Ball Express. Congestion resulted when the routes were also used by the First and Third Armies and the Ninth Air Force, with military and civilian vehicles sometimes attempting to move against the flow of Red Ball traffic. The deadline was not met, but by 5 September 89,000 long tons (90,000 t) had been delivered to the Dreux-Chartres area.

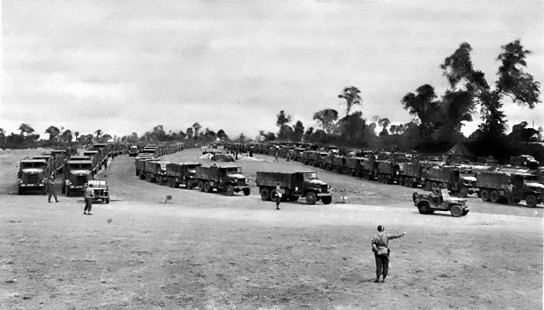
A Red Ball Express convoy moves through a regulating point.

Although this ended its original mission, the Red Ball Express continued to operate until the end of September, with deliveries further afield to Soissons and Hirson in support of the First Army and Fontainebleau and Sommesous in support of the Third Army. From 16 September to 12 October, eight companies, six of which were equipped with 2 1/2-ton 6×6 trucks and two with 10-ton semi-trailers, were withdrawn from the Red Ball Express to run a series of Red Lion convoys. These delivered 18,000 long tons (18,000 t) to the 21st Army Group, half of which went to the 82nd and 101st Airborne Divisions. The eight companies were replaced by provisional companies formed from the personnel and vehicles of the newly arrived 26th, 95th, and 104th Infantry Divisions.

The achievements of the Red Ball Express came at a high price. It consumed 300,000 US gallons (1,100,000 L) of MT80 a day. Drivers drove their vehicles at twice the 25 miles (40 km) speed limit, and trucks carried double their nominal loads. The practice of overloading vehicles had the official sanction of the War Department, but testing of this had been carried out at the Aberdeen Proving Ground, and conditions in France were more grueling. Consumption of the most common type of tire, the 750 × 20 8-ply, rose from an average of 29,142 per month from June to August to 55,059 in September. By 9 October, there were only 2,000 spares on the continent and 46,596 left in the UK. Nearly two thirds of the loss of tires was attributable to running over carelessly discarded C-ration cans that littered the roads. Vehicles were run without proper maintenance, and dry batteries, lack of oil and loose nuts and bolts caused breakdowns. Driver fatigue was an important factor; round trips sometimes went for 48 to 65 hours. In one convoy, eight semi-trailers hauling gasoline went over an embankment. The following day, eight 2 1/2-ton trucks repeated this mishap at the same location. Ordnance personnel noted instances of vehicles that had been sabotaged by their drivers. By the end of September, 5,750 vehicles required major repairs.

== Resupply by air ==
To relieve pressure on the over-burdened Motor Transport Brigade, recourse was made to resupply by air. Although fast and flexible, air supply had many disadvantages, the main one being low tonnage capacity, but the variable availability of transport aircraft, their vulnerability to enemy fighters, and their susceptibility to bad weather were also limiting factors. On 10 and 11 August the 2nd Battalion, 120th Infantry, isolated by the German counterattack at Mortain, received supplies by air drop.

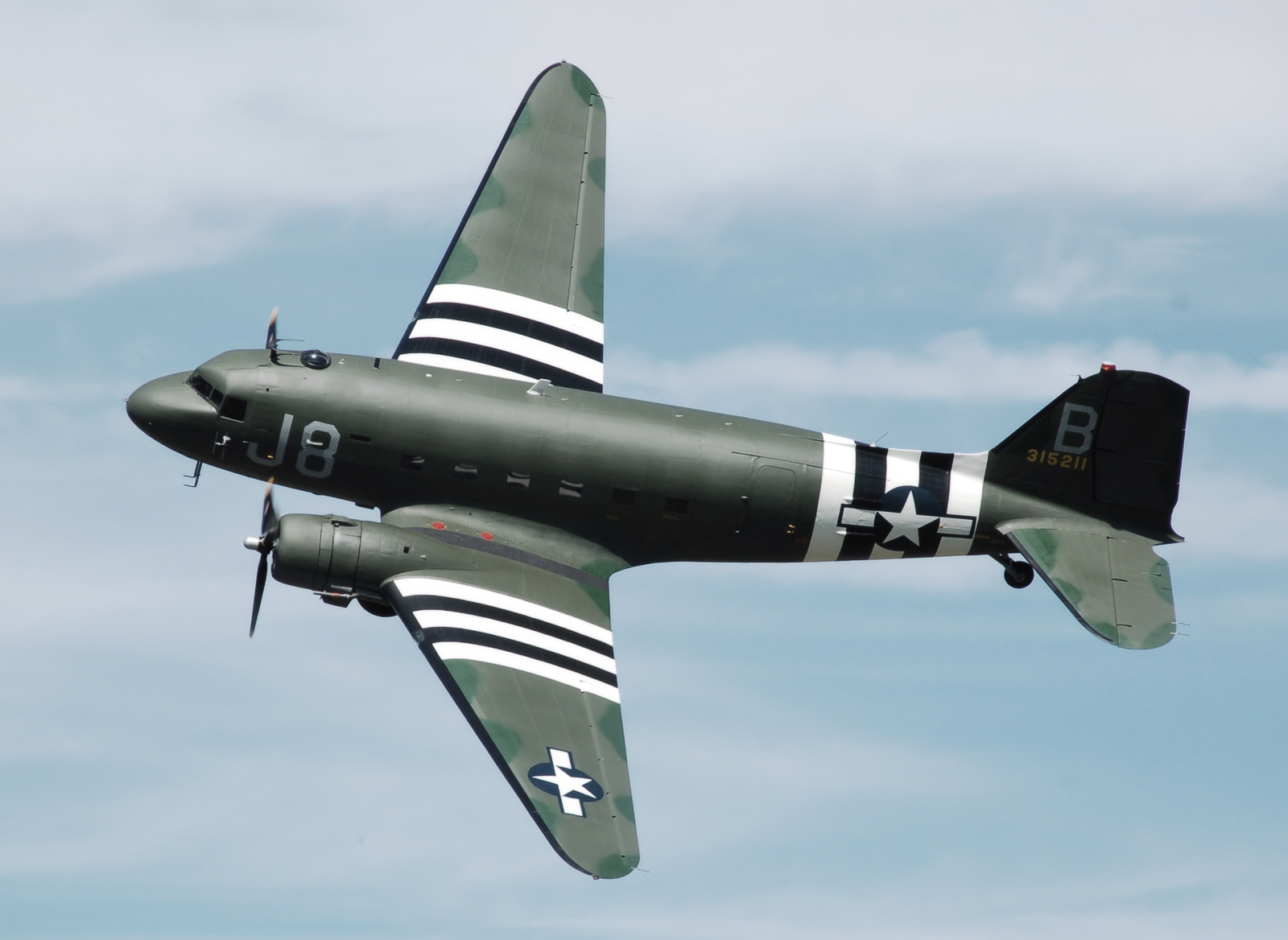
A C-47 transport

On 15 August, SHAEF made available an allocation of air transport capable of delivering up to 2,000 long tons (2,000 t) per day to the Le Mans area from airbases in the UK. Deliveries to a newly opened air field there began on 19 August. Due to bad weather and problems with the airfield, an average of 600 long tons (610 t) per day was delivered over the following week. By 22 August, there were 383 fully loaded C-47 transport aircraft in the UK awaiting dispatch. The problem was a lack of suitable landing fields. Rehabilitating captured German airfields or building new ones required the movement of engineer stores using scarce motor transport. 12th Army Group allocated 2,100 long tons (2,100 t) per day to such stores during the pursuit, but the Ninth Air Force gave priority to forward fighter airfields. The air resupply system was also characterized by poor communications, resulting in duplicated requests, and motor transport being sent to the wrong airfields in the UK and France. The early capture of Paris on 25 August forced Eisenhower to allocate 500 long tons (510 t) per day to civil relief supplies, mainly food, medical supplies and soap. Given the limited carrying capacity of transport aircraft—each C-47 could only carry about 3 long tons (3.0 t) per sortie—air resupply could never be more than a supplement, although it was useful for urgently required items.

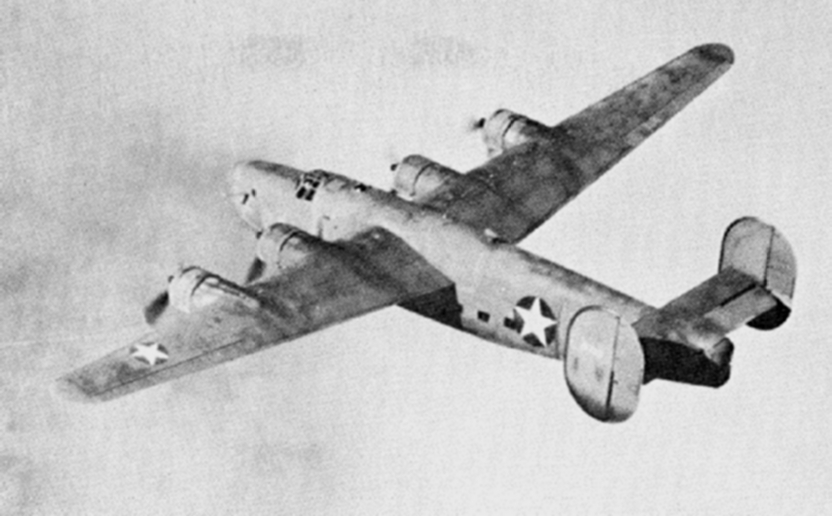
A converted B-24 transport

Deliveries by air peaked at 2,900 long tons (2,900 t) (including 500 long tons (510 t) to Paris) on 26 and 27 August, but then tailed off as the C-47s were withdrawn for airborne operations on 29 August. To make up for them, the United States Strategic Air Forces made 100 Consolidated B-24 Liberator aircraft available, which had to be modified to carry cargo, but these required longer airfields and increased intervals between landings. During the week of 27 August to 2 September, 4,470 long tons (4,540 t) was delivered by air, of which 443 long tons (450 t) was carried by B-24s, but only 1,877 long tons (1,907 t) was delivered to the 12th Army Group; 917 long tons (932 t) went to 21st Army Group and 1,676 long tons (1,703 t) to Paris. On 3 September, SHAEF ordered the First Allied Airborne Army to release 600 C-47s for air supply duties. On 14 September they were again withdrawn, for Operation Market Garden. Between 20 August and 16 September, 23,216 long tons (23,589 t) of supplies were delivered by air, of which 12,799 long tons (13,004 t) went to the 12th Army Group, 7,766 long tons (7,891 t) to the 21st Army Group, and 2,651 long tons (2,694 t) to Paris. From 18 September, B-24s began shipping POL in bulk because the stock of jerricans in the UK had nearly been exhausted. By the end of the month, over 2,500,000 US gallons (9,500,000 L) had been delivered this way.

== Beaches ==
During the breakout and pursuit, maintenance of the American forces was primarily through the Normandy beaches. A storm struck on 1 August, but the beaches were restored to normal operation within three days. The excellent performance of the beaches in July led to the tonnage targets being raised from 5,700 long tons (5,800 t) per day to 10,000 long tons (10,000 t) for Utah and from 10,000 long tons (10,000 t) per day to 15,000 long tons (15,000 t) for Omaha. Utah beach discharged 10,500 long tons (10,700 t) on 6 August, and a record 11,577 long tons (11,763 t) two days later, but thereafter met the target only once, on 29 September. Omaha met its new target on 9 and 10 August, and for four days running from 17 to 20 August. On 25 August a record 16,078 long tons (16,336 t) was discharged. Rough weather and heavy seas hampered beach operations on 2, 3 and 7 September, and there was another storm on 11 September that restricted operations for three days. Rain, fog and heavy seas intermittently affected beach operations in August and September, but in October conditions were consistently bad, and Utah and Omaha beaches were closed for good on 13 and 19 November respectively.

== Ports ==
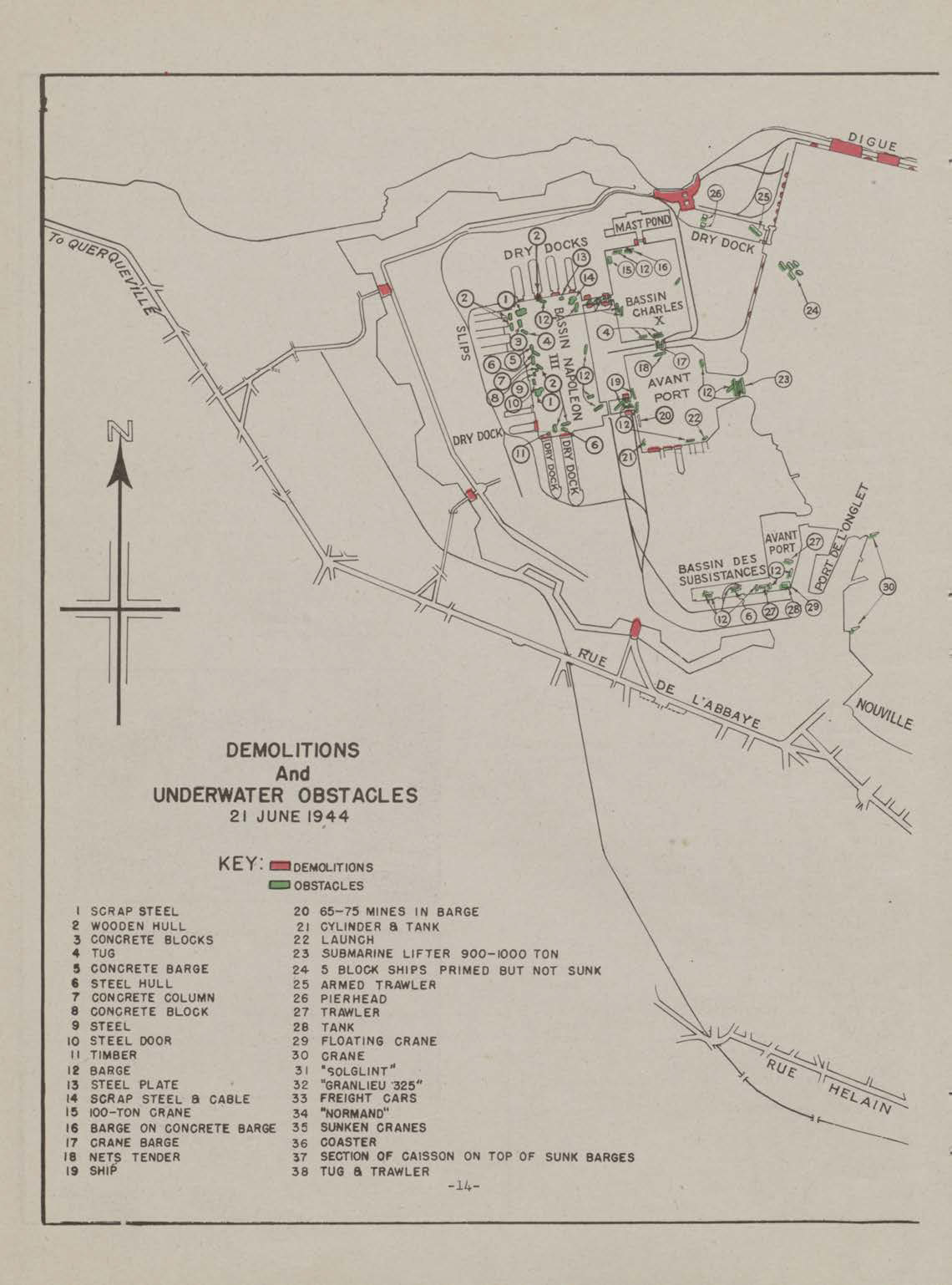
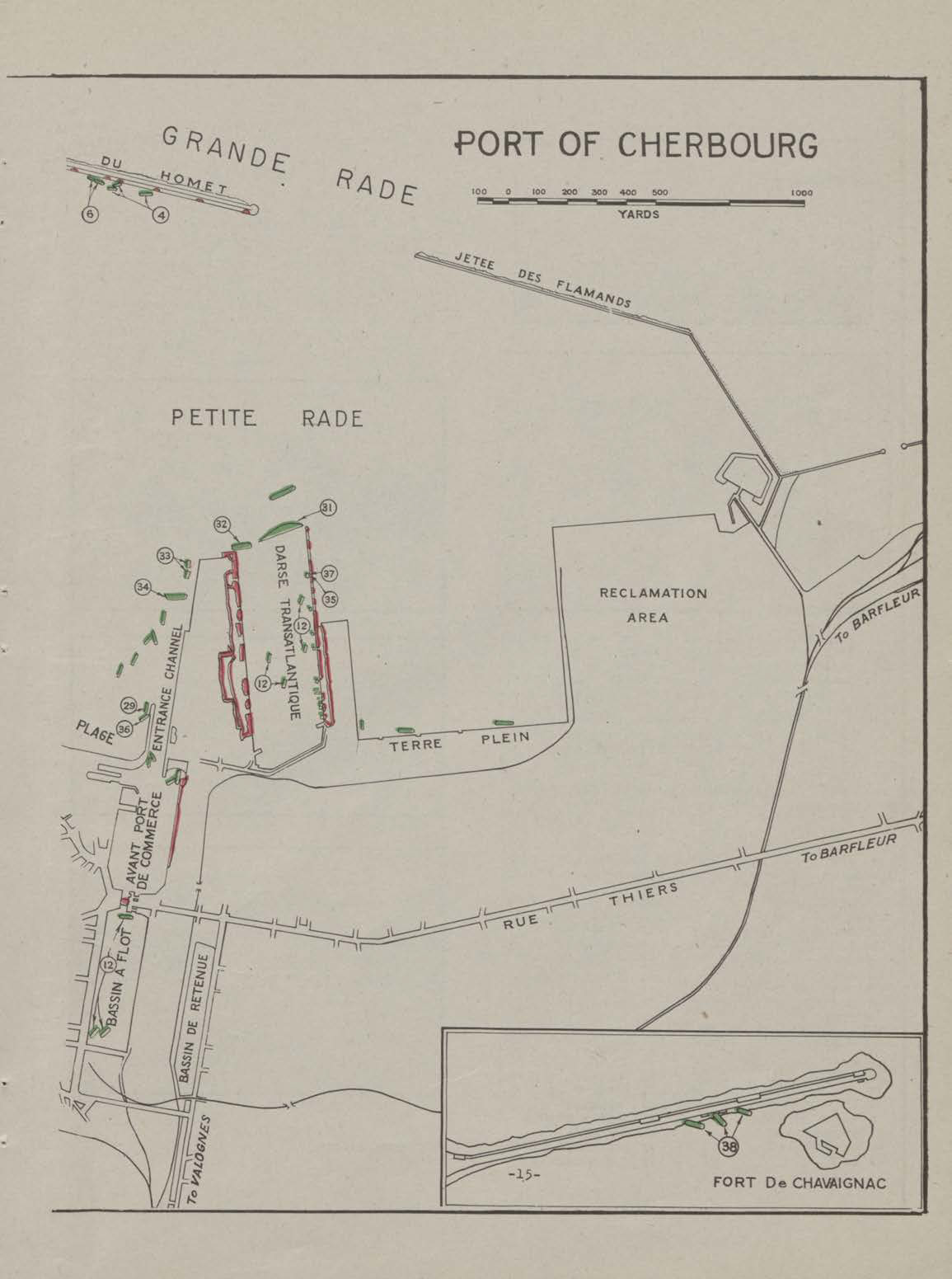
Cherbourg demolitions and underwater obstacles

The first deep water port captured by the Allies was Cherbourg, which fell on 26 June. An advance party surveyed the port the following day. The Cherbourg Maritime station, the main railway station, was badly damaged, as were the two main quays, the Quai Normandie and the Quai de France. The Digue du Homet, a 3,300-by-70-foot (1,006 by 21 m) mole, had two 100-foot (30 m) wide craters in it. The western breakwater of the inner port, the Petite Rade, was severed by two large craters, and the berth for coal coasters, the Quai Homet, had nine 40-to-50-foot (12 to 15 m) craters. The entrances to the three basins were obstructed by sunken ships and barges, and the basins themselves were filled with sunken barges, tugs, coasters and trawlers. The German naval commander in Cherbourg, Rear Admiral Walter Hennecke, now a prisoner of war, was awarded the Knight's Cross of the Iron Cross for the demolition of the port, but the damage was not as extensive as the Germans believed. The demolitions had been prepared well in advance, but the final phase had not been carried out, presumably because the personnel responsible were killed or captured when the city fell.

Rehabilitation work was undertaken by the 1056th Port Construction and Repair Group, with the 332nd and 342nd Engineer Regiments and the 333rd Engineer Special Service Regiment assigned. The first priority was creating a landing site for DUKW amphibious trucks on the Nouvelle Plage, a bathing beach. This was ready on 6 July, but the DUKWs could not come ashore because the Grande and Petite Rades had been sown with mines. Twenty US Navy coastal minesweepers and the British 9th and 159th Minesweeping Flotillas were engaged in mine clearance. Many of the mines were of a delayed action kind that only became active after a set number of days. Eight acoustic and eight magnetic sweeps were conducted every morning for 85 days. By 13 July, 133 mines had been swept, of which 86 were magnetic or acoustic. This did not include the small concrete-encased KMA (kustenmine-A) coastal mines, known as "Katie mines", sown in shallow waters, that had to be removed by divers. Three minesweepers were lost to mines, as were some small craft and barges. The first four Liberty ships entered the Grande Rade on 16 July, and were unloaded at anchor into DUKWs.

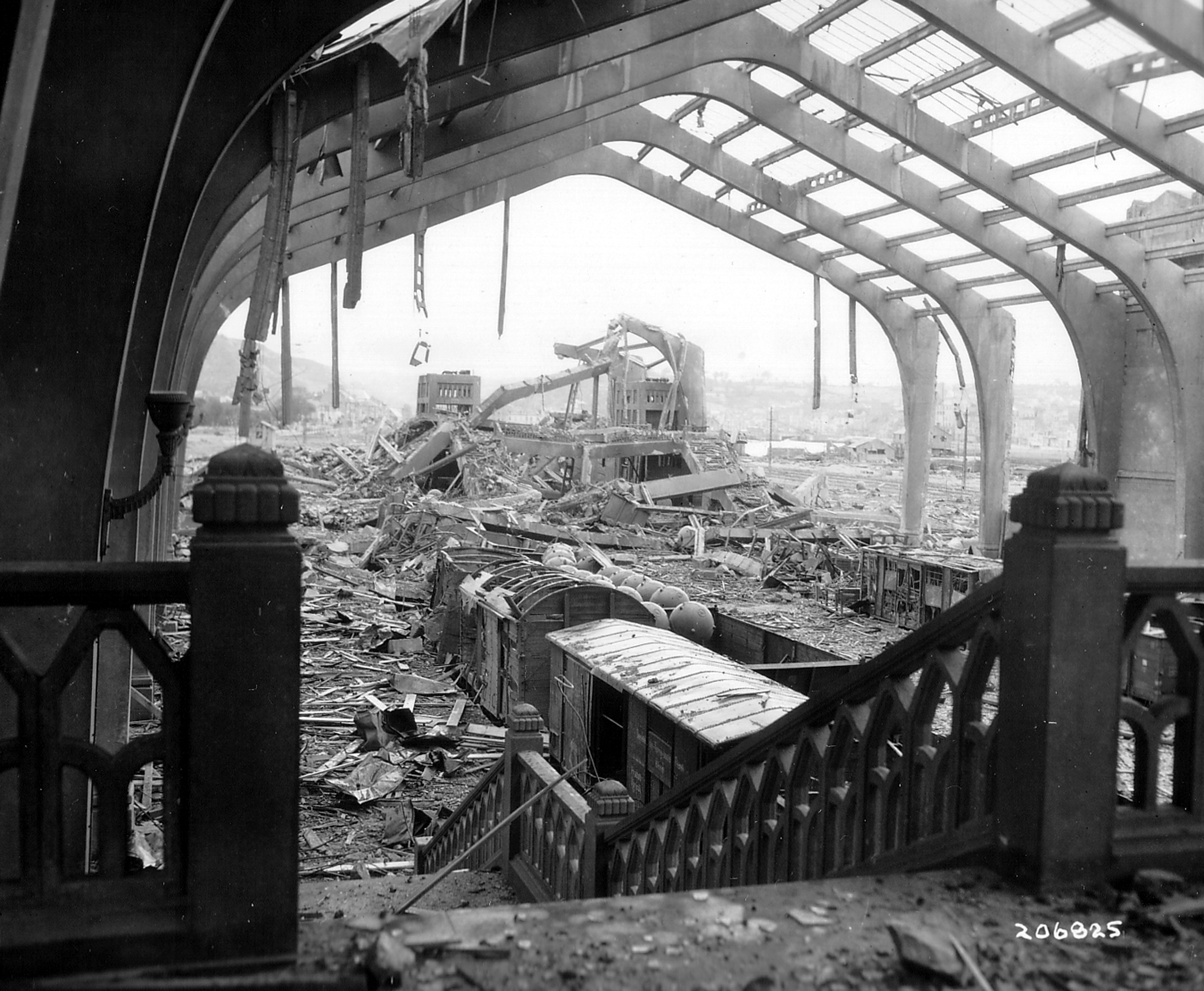
Destruction at the Gare Maritime at Cherbourg. The round objects in the carriage are naval mines.

The 332nd Engineer General Service Regiment filled in the craters in the Digue du Homet, and repaired the road and railway lines leading to it. Two berths were prepared for Twickenham ferries, British vessels built to carry locomotives and rolling stock. The first arrived on 29 July with several 65-long-ton (66 t) diesel electric locomotives and rolling stock. The first Liberty ship docked there on 9 August. Getting the naval base working to accommodate Liberty ships involved repairing demolished bridges. It ultimately provided eleven berths for Liberty ships. The wreckage of the Gare Maritime was found to contain twenty-four freight cars loaded with mines the German had apparently not had time to detonate. These were carefully deactivated and removed. On 10 August, the port repair ship Junior N. Van Noy, a converted Great Lakes steamer, arrived with specialized salvage equipment. An access channel to the Darse Transatlantique (cargo dock) was cleared of debris and mines by 18 September, and the first Liberty ship docked there on 8 October. By September, Cherbourg was the second largest port supporting the US forces after Marseille. Between 16 July and the end of the war, it handled 2,137 ships, which discharged 2,816,740 long tons (2,861,940 t) of cargo and 130,210 passengers. In addition, 307,939 passengers were embarked, including 124,206 German prisoners of war and 148,753 wounded Allied soldiers.

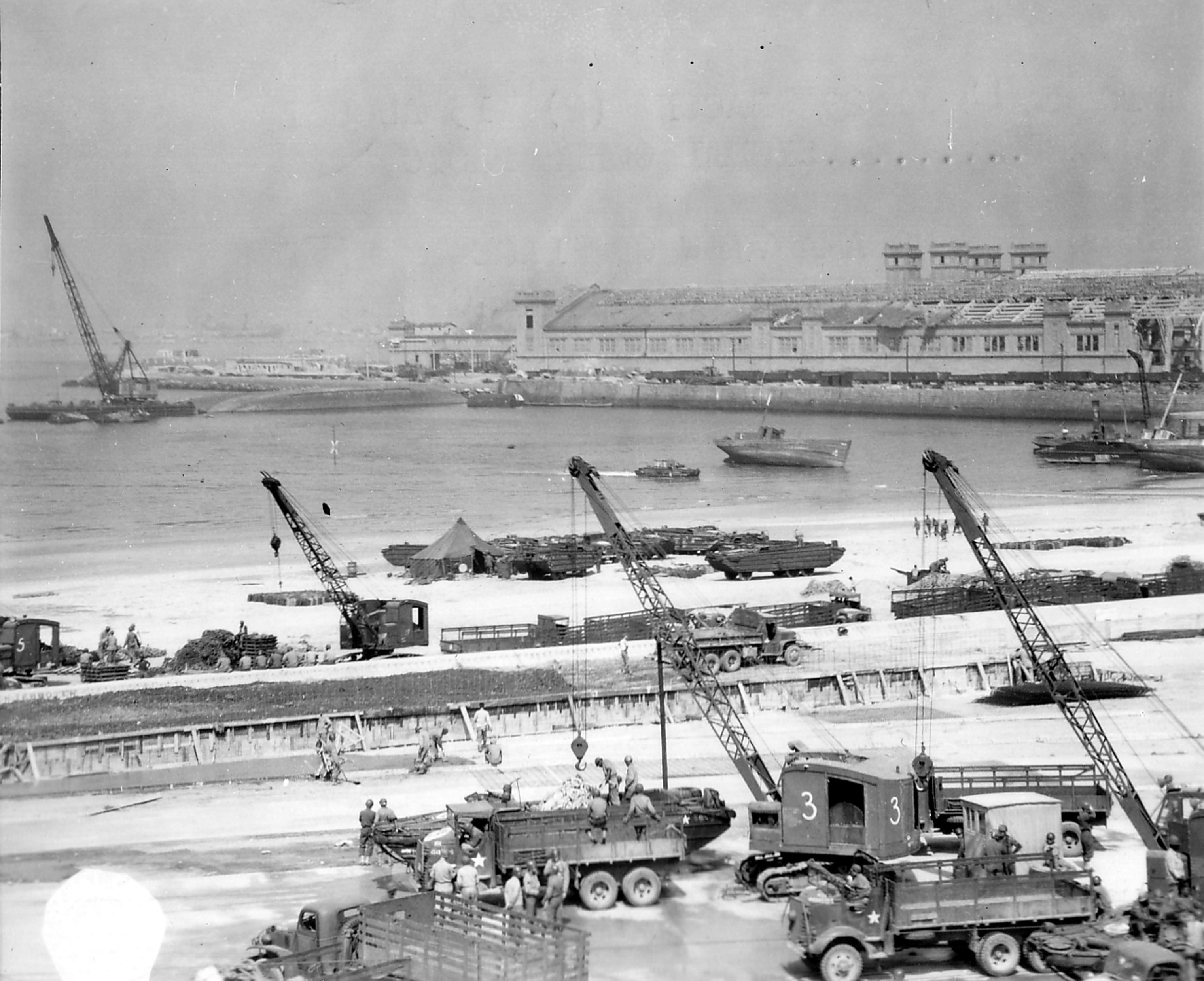
Vehicles and cranes carry out the repair work in Cherbourg.

The first port captured in the breakout was Granville on 31 July. Like Cherbourg, it had been subject to systematic demolition, with quays cratered, cranes tipped into the water, and the harbor blocked with sunken craft. Rehabilitation was undertaken by the 1055th and 1058th Port Construction and Repair Groups. It was operated solely as a coal port, and averaged 1,244 long tons (1,264 t) per day from when it was opened on 18 September until it closed on 21 April 1945. In Brittany Saint-Michel-en-Grève was opened as a port for LSTs to discharge ammunition in support of the siege of Brest. The task of rehabilitating Saint-Brieuc, Cancale and Saint-Malo was undertaken by the 1053rd Port Construction and Repair Group and the 360th Engineer General Service Regiment, but work on Saint-Malo was abandoned as it neared completion because the task of opening the inland waterways to it was not considered worth the effort, and it was handed over to the French on 21 November.

Tidal conditions at Cancale proved unfavorable, and it was never used. Saint-Brieuc was opened in mid-September but discharges averaged only 317 long tons (322 t) per day, mostly coal for local railways and power stations, and it was handed over to the French on 9 November. Morlaix was taken on 8 August. Like Granville had inner and outer basins. It was not badly damaged, and was quickly restored by the 1057th Port Construction and Repair Group, and the first convoy of two Liberty ships and ten LSTs carrying supplies for VIII Corps arrived on 25 August. Nearby Roscoff was also opened. Between them, they had anchorages for up to six Liberty ships, which were discharged using lighters, and handled and average of 2,105 long tons (2,139 t) per day until they were closed on 15 December. The small ports of Brittany proved uneconomical to operate; their capacity was small, they had no deep-water berths, and by the time they were repaired they were hundreds of miles from the front. However, they met a critical need at a time when bad weather threatened to close the Normandy beaches.

== Outcome ==
Lieutenant Colonel Harold L. Mack, who served on the COMZ staff, described the failure to implement Operation Chastity as the "Critical Error of World War II", but the historian Russell Weigley regarded the commitment to Brittany as wasteful of resources better spent supporting the drive to the east. Senior American commanders subordinated logistical imperatives to operational opportunities. When the Germans were outmanoeuvered and then driven into a chaotic retreat, the Allied commanders pushed their forces to the limits logistically to take advantage of the situation. Logistical forecasts were repeatedly shown to be overly pessimistic, imbuing a sense of confidence that logistical shortcomings could be overcome. Although Bradley's decision entailed grave risk, the US Army's logistical difficulties in the pursuit were not a result of inadequate port resources—in November there were still some 600,000 long tons (610,000 t) of supplies stockpiled in the Normandy lodgment area. Rather, the problem was the inability to deliver them. Nor was the pursuit halted solely by a shortage of POL.

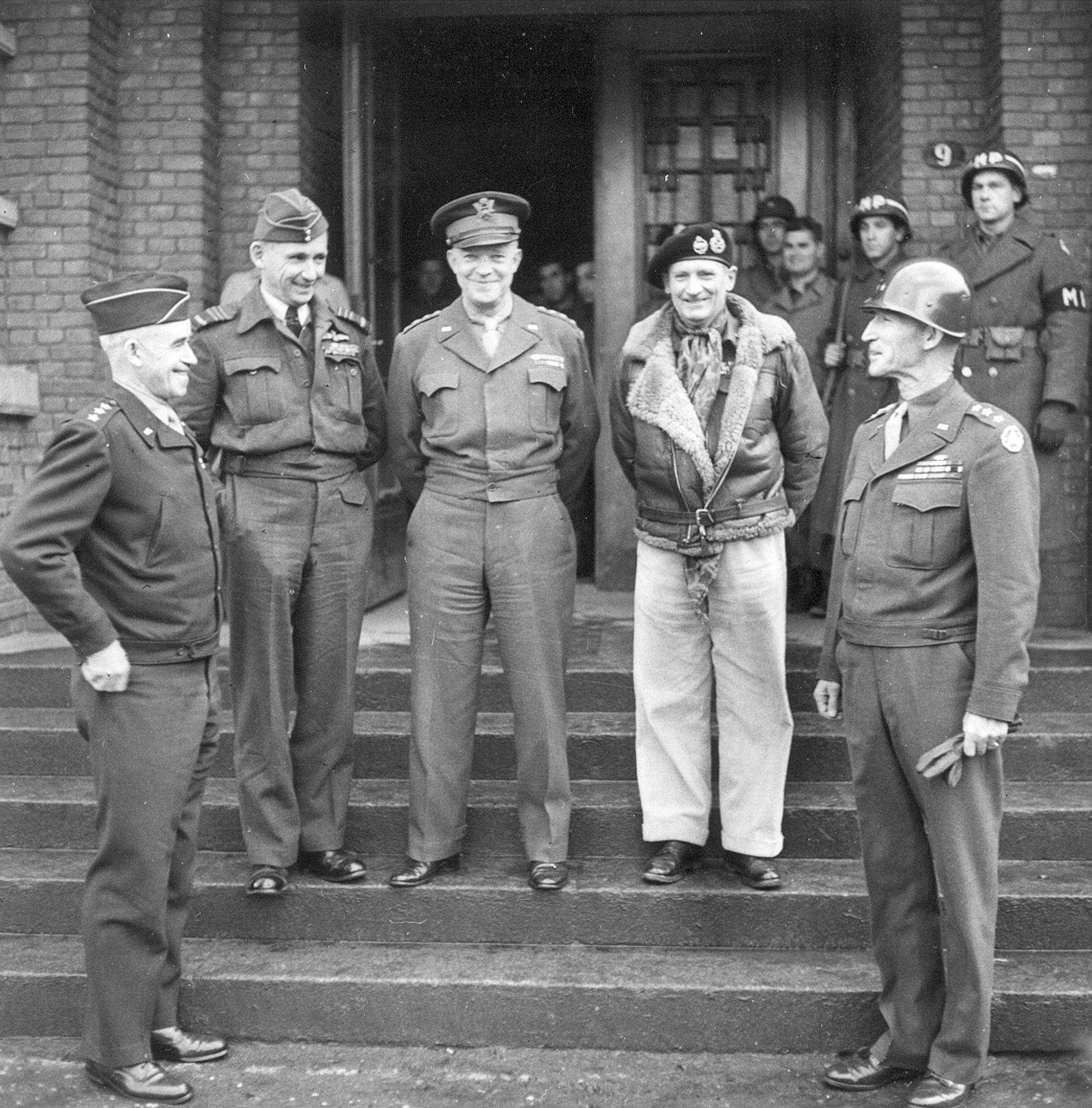
Senior Allied commanders. Left to right: Bradley, Tedder, Eisenhower, Montgomery and Simpson.

Failure to follow proper procedures contributed to the waste and disorder that characterized the pursuit. Dumps established by the armies were frequently turned over to COMZ with little or no paperwork, leading to supplies that went unrecorded, unidentified and unlocated, resulting in duplicate requisitions. This was exacerbated by the despatch of filler cargoes of unwanted goods shipped solely to make maximum use of the available transport. The indenting system itself was not perfect; it had difficulty responding to urgent demands. Logisticians at all levels strove to improvise, adapt and overcome difficulties, with considerable success, but short-term solutions frequently created longer-term problems. Hoarding, bartering, over-requisitioning, and cannibalizing vehicles for spare parts degraded the effectiveness of the supply system.

Motor transport was used as a stopgap, but there was a shortage of suitable vehicles owing to political interference and production difficulties. The tardy delivery of vehicles adversely affected the training of motor transport unit personnel, and the US Army's racial segregation complicated matters. The cost of inadequate training of truck drivers was paid in avoidable damage to vehicles through accidents and poor maintenance. The pursuit resulted in large quantities of equipment being damaged, worn out, and written off. In November, SHAEF reported to the War Department that each month, 700 mortars, 375 medium and 125 light tanks, 900 2 1/2-ton trucks, 1,500 jeeps, and 100 artillery pieces had been written off. Tank losses in August and September respectively had been 25.3 percent and 16.5 percent of establishment, and the reserves were exhausted. Over 15,000 vehicles were deadlined, awaiting repairs or parts.

When Bradley and his army commanders and their staffs ran into foreseeable logistical difficulties, they blamed each other, they blamed COMZ, they blamed the British, and they blamed SHAEF. In December 1944, the Chief of Army Service Forces, Lieutenant General Brehon B. Somervell sent his Director of Operations, Major General LeRoy Lutes, to study the ETO's difficulties. He found that the army commanders had little confidence in COMZ, and that they had little logistical acumen. Lutes credited the commander of the Ninth Army, Lieutenant General William H. Simpson, with the best understanding of logistics. Lutes noted that Hodges was "a man intolerant of supply shortcomings, who has not studied supply and does not intend to". Given that Bradley, Hodges, Patton and Simpson had all attended the Command and General Staff College and Army War College, this pointed to a deficiency in the Army's training of senior officers. There was also a flaw in the American command arrangements, whereby operations came under Bradley, but logistics under Lee, with the theater headquarters (ETOUSA) combined with Lee's COMZ. The field commanders would have preferred an American headquarters with authority over both. As it was, they looked to the American element of SHAEF to resolve disputes.

The supply shortages that occurred during the pursuit were not entirely the fault of COMZ; the shortage of trucks had its origins back in the United States. Nonetheless, the logistical plan lacked the flexibility needed to cope with a rapidly changing operational situation. The decision to continue the pursuit beyond the Seine stretched the logistical system to breaking point, and had long-term and far-reaching effects in the form of the attrition of equipment, failure to establish a proper supply depot system, neglect of the development of ports, and inadequate stockpiles in forward areas, all of which were exacerbated by the poor supply discipline of the American soldier. These factors would be keenly felt in the months to come. The historian Roland Ruppenthal concluded that in the end, "operations, to paraphrase an old maxim, had definitely become the art of the logistically feasible".

== See also ==
- American logistics in the Normandy campaign
- British logistics in the Normandy campaign
