= ADSEC =

Advanced Section Communications Zone European Theater of Operations, U.S. Army
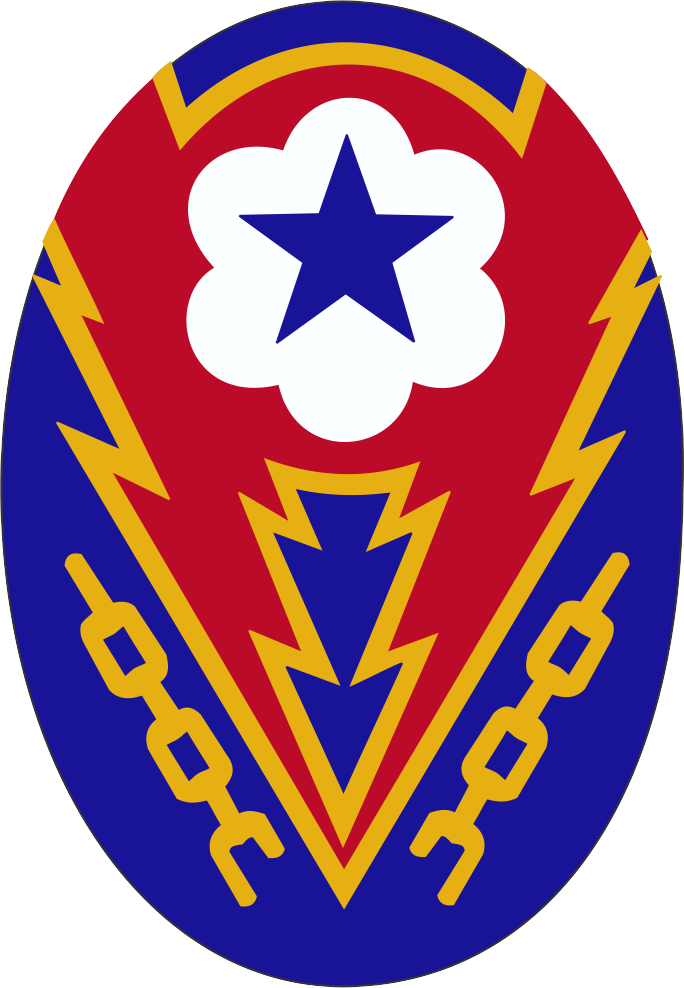
- Shoulder sleeve insignia for Communications Zone, ETO
- Active: 1944 to 1945
- Country: United States
- Branch: United States Army
- Role: Services of Supply
- Part of: European Theater of Operations, U.S. Army (ETOUSA)
- Garrison/HQ: None
- Engagements: Normandy Landings

Commanders
- Notable commanders: Major General Ewart G. Plank

ADSEC, officially the Advance Section of the Communications Zone, was a military logistics unit active in the Second World War. It was the farthest forward supply unit in the US Army's European Theater of Operations (ETOUSA). The section moved forward with the armies, established by the Communications Zone, the area directly behind the Combat Zone, in order to provide close support to soldiers in combat.

== Creation ==
ADSEC was formally activated at Bristol, England in February 1944. Upon its creation, ADSEC was attached to the U.S. First Army, but from the outset was one of the ten geographic sections of the Communications Zone (Com-Z, ETO) logistics organization, and was the first Army logistical agency on the continent. ADSEC officially began operations on 6 June 1944 with the Normandy landings (D-Day).

== Mode of operation ==
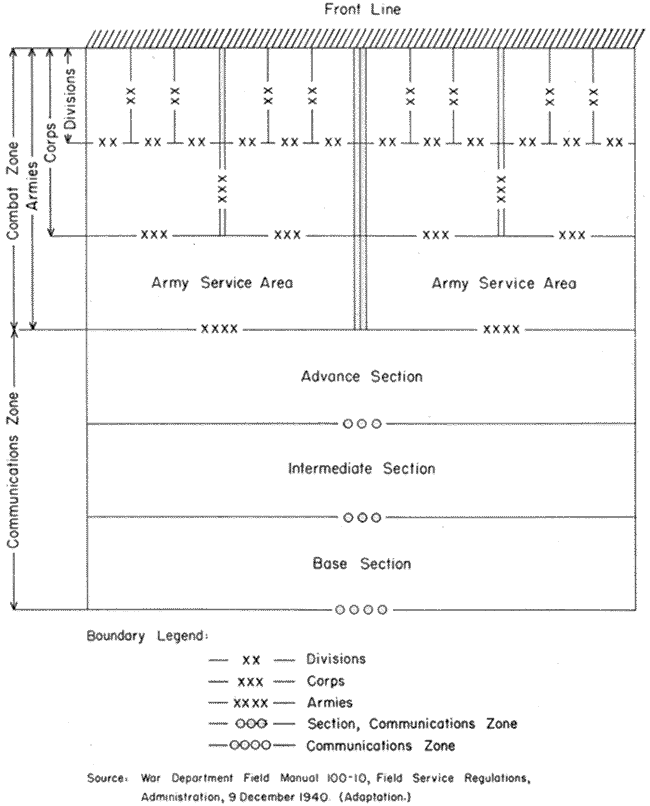
Chart 12.- Typical organization of a theater of operations as envisaged by War Department Doctrine, 1940, showing an "Advance Section" in the Communications Zone, serving immediately contiguous to – and directly supplying – the armies in the Combat Zone.

Because ADSEC moved with front lines, it did not have a "base" of operations and was designed to be on the move continuously. Instead, major operations always had a designated "D" day or start date, upon (or a few days after) which, ADSEC units were moved into the operating areas. They stayed until about D+40, then moved on to the next "D" location, leaving FECOMZ (Forward Echelon, Communications Zone) units to take over. By the end of the war, the Com-Z comprised the United Kingdom Base, Channel Base, Normandy Base, Oise Intermediate Base, Seine Base Sections, ADSEC, the Bremen Port Command established to move materiel to the Pacific theater of Operations (PTO), and the Assembly Area Command to move men to the PTO or home. The Com-Z also comprised the Delta Base and Continental Advance Section (CONAD) coming from southern France in support of the Sixth United States Army Group.

== Roles ==
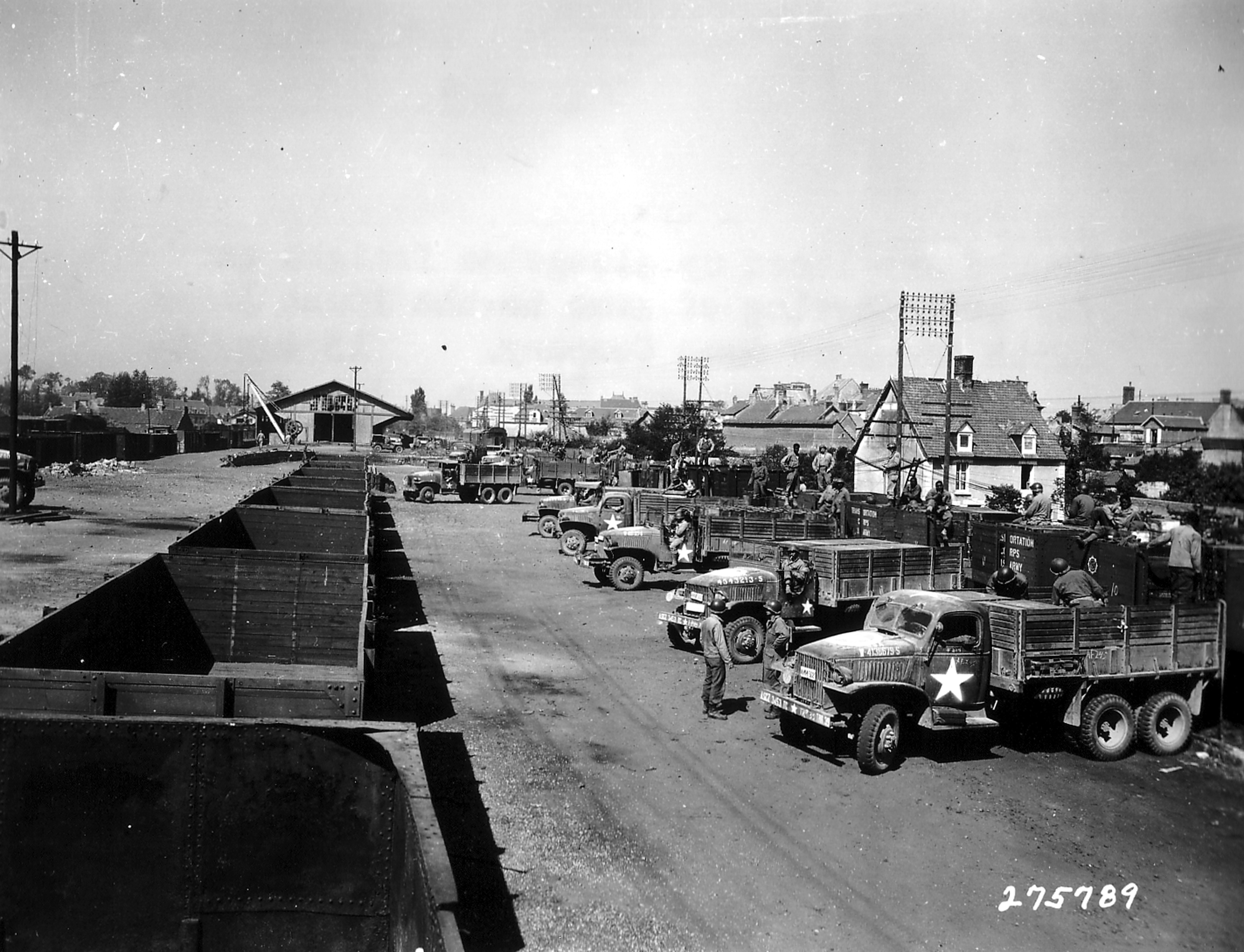
ADSEC trucks at Carentan railway station, 15 August 1944

ADSEC units included field hospitals close to the rear of the advancing armies. The Com-Z also operated blood banks for the refrigerated storage of large quantities of blood for use at front line ADSEC hospitals. This system of location of storage depots was flexible, so that in advance of a major military operation blood would be stored where needed, close to front line, but when the engagement was over then blood would be transported back to hospitals and other bases, or wherever it was needed.

Besides staging supplies for the advancing armies to be sustained by ADSEC, the Com-Z also rehabilitated railway rolling stock, restoring rail operations to ever-more forward bases, and provided transportation of food, ordnance, and POL (Petroleum, Oil and Lubricants) using motor operations (see Red Ball Express).

ADSEC also included Finance disbursement units. These units were employed to compute payrolls, travel vouchers, etc. and prepare disbursements and collections of currency, though combat soldiers usually banked their pay until on R & R. ADSEC also coordinated disbursement of ordnance and munitions to keep the front lines supplied. Com-Z officials were responsible for overseeing Red Ball Express trucking within the Com-Z Transportation Section that brought materiel to ADSEC to distribute it. ADSEC units had to anticipate the needs of the advancing armies and provide as close support as possible as the situations demanded. These units also provided heavy maintenance work for the advancing armies within the Com-Z Ordnance Section.

== Activities ==
After the Normandy landings on 6 June 1944, ADSEC was detached from the U.S. First Army and took control of activities on Omaha Beach, prior to the capture of the port of Cherbourg Harbor on 27 June. Its engineering activities included managing the beaches and building artificial ports before handing control of the area to Com-Z units.

Eventually the Com-Z and ADSEC were supporting all three northwest Europe U.S. combat armies (1st, 3rd, & 9th) moving across France and into Belgium, Holland and Germany. Com-Z had split into two sections in the fall of 1942 to support the Operation Torch invasion of North Africa, then Sicily, Italy, and southern France, continuing with its Delta Base Section feeding the ADSEC-similar Continental Advance Section (CONAD) that followed the U.S. 7th and French 1st Armies coming at Germany from the south.

== End of combat operations ==
After victory on 8 May 1945, all Communication Zone units, including the Advance Section, were rebranded as Theater Service Forces, European Theater (TSF/ET) as they were no longer supporting combat operations. At the end of hostilities, ADSEC was close at hand in central and eastern Germany, and sustained the Allied armies as they settled in for occupation duty. They distributed food and fuel to aid the millions of refugees. ADSEC would become a part of EUCOM COMZ in 1951.

== Insignia ==
The patch, which is actually the entire Communications Zone ETO patch, represents the Allies breaking the chains of Nazi oppression. Soldiers in ADSEC would add an identifying tab above the Com-Z patch, distinguishing them from the other nine geographic sections of the Com-Z.

The patch is based on the overall European Theater of Operations, United States Army (ETOUSA's) patch, with the addition of a blue 5 pointed star in a white six-lobed field – the emblem of the Army Service Forces (ASF), one of the three autonomous components of the United States Army during World War II, the other two being Army Ground Forces, and the United States Army Air Forces.

Shoulder patch of the ASF, one of the three autonomous components of the United States Army during World War II

Shoulder patch of the overall ETOUSA

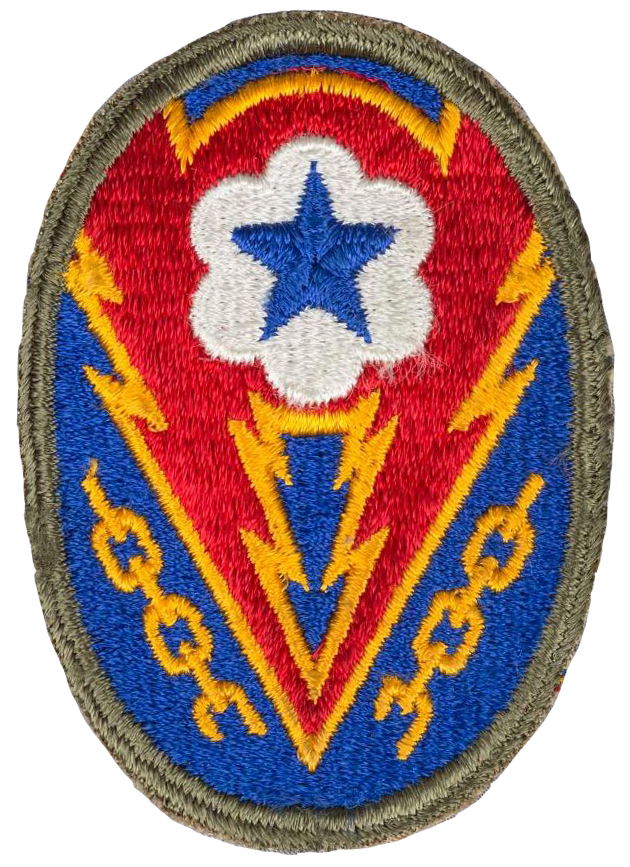
As a section of the ASF, serving in the ETOUSA, the shoulder patch insignia of Com-Z combined the emblems of both of those senior commands

== See also ==
- Services of Supply
- Army Service Forces
- American logistics in the Northern France campaign
- American transportation in the Siegfried Line campaign
- American logistics in the Western Allied invasion of Germany
