= Ewart G. Plank =

US Army general (1897–1982)

Ewart Gladstone Plank
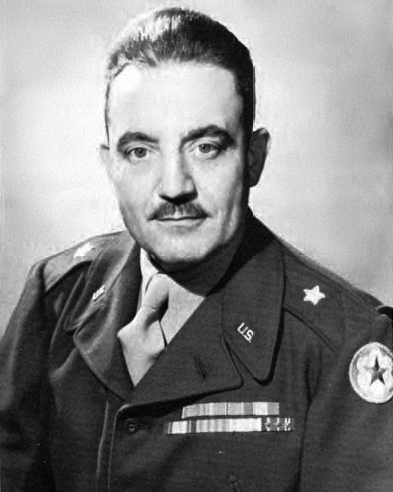
- Brigadier General Ewart G. Plank
- Born: 4 November 1897; Garden City, Missouri
- Died: 2 September 1982 (aged 84); San Francisco, California
- Burial place: Riverside National Cemetery
- Military career
- Allegiance: United States
- Branch: United States Army
- Service years: 1917–1918; 1920–1949
- Rank: Major general
- Service number: 0-12649
- Units: United States Army Coast Artillery Corps; United States Army Corps of Engineers
- Commands: Advance Section; New York Port of Embarkation
- Conflicts: World War I; World War II
- Awards: Army Distinguished Service Medal; Legion of Merit; Bronze Star (2); Croix de Commander de l'Ordre de Leopold II (Belgium); Cross of Merit (Poland); Commander of the Order of the British Empire (UK); Croix de Guerre (France); Chevalier of the Officer of the Legion of Honor (France); Distinguished Service Medal (Greece)

Major General Ewart Gladstone Plank (4 November 1897 – 2 September 1982) was a United States Army career officer who was a veteran of World War I and World War II. A graduate of the United States Military Academy at West Point, New York, he was ranked 44th in the class of 1920. He was commissioned in the Coast Artillery Corps, but later transferred to the Corps of Engineers. During World War II he commanded the Advance Section, Communications Zone (ADSEC).

== Early life ==
Ewart Gladstone Plank was born in Garden City, Missouri, on 4 November 1897, the son of Ulysses and Emma Plank née Zeigler. He had an older sister, Elizabeth. The family moved to Lawrence, Kansas, where he entered the University of Kansas in 1915, and joined the Kansas National Guard. In 1917, he was called to active duty for World War I, and served in the ranks in France with the 137th Infantry Regiment, part of the 35th Division.

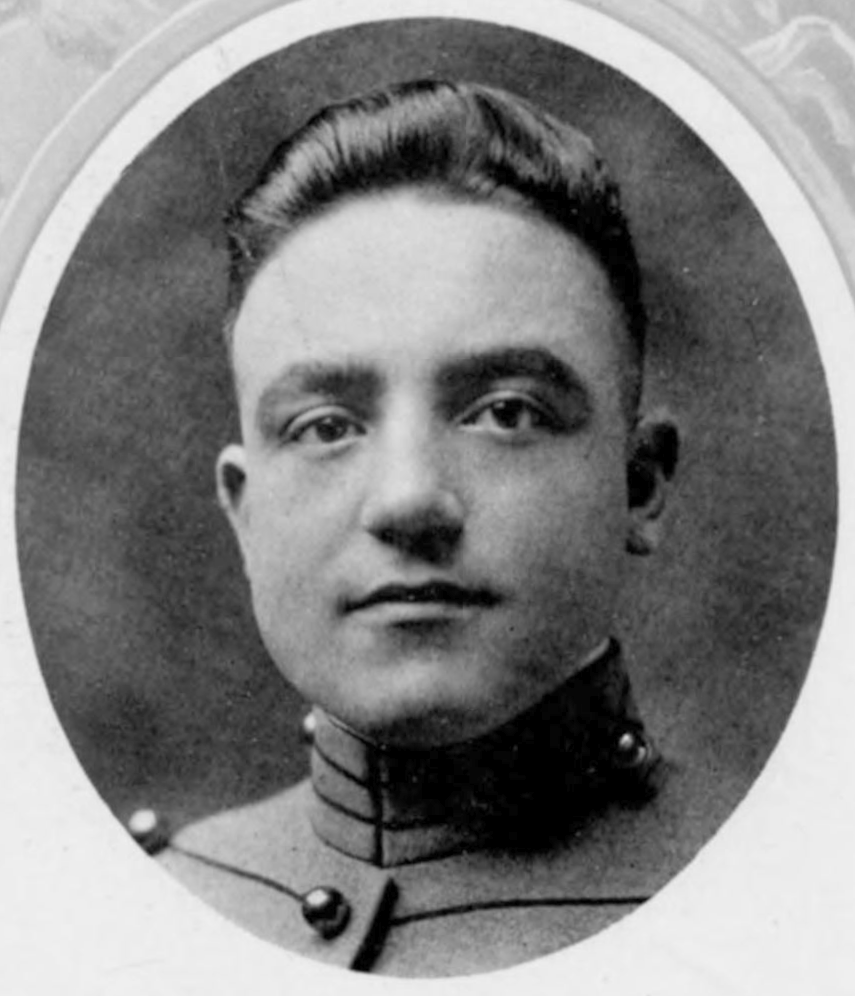
At West Point in 1920

Plank returned to the United States on being appointed to the United States Military Academy (USMA) at West Point, New York, which he entered on 17 June 1918. He became an editor of the annual yearbook, The Howitzer. The class of 1920 was initially supposed to graduate after one year, but the end of the war led to it being extended. The class was given the option of graduating after three years instead of just two. None did however, and the entire class graduated on 15 June 1920. He was ranked 44th in the class.

Plank was commissioned as a second lieutenant in the Coast Artillery Corps on 2 July 1920, and promoted to first lieutenant the same day. To give seniority to reserve officers who had served overseas and wished to take a regular commission, the new graduates' commissioning had been delayed by seventeen days. The army paid them in the interim, despite a Government Accountability Office ruling that they were not entitled to it.

== Between the wars ==
Plank transferred to the Corps of Engineers on 4 September 1920. He attended the Engineer Officer Basic Course at Camp A. A. Humphreys, Virginia, from 15 September 1920 to 27 January 1921, and was then posted to the 2nd Engineer Regiment at Camp Travis, Texas. He attended the Engineer School at Rensselaer Polytechnic Institute from 1 June 1921 to 18 June 1922, where he studied civil engineering. He was assigned to McCook Field, Ohio, where he was involved in aerial survey and mapping. If any members of the class of 1920 thought that things could not get worse, they were wrong; on 15 December 1922, the whole class was demoted to the rank of second lieutenant.

On 28 March 1925, Plank was promoted to first lieutenant again. He attended the Air Corps Primary Flying School at Brooks Field, Texas, from 15 September 1926 to 28 February 1927, when he was graduated, and then the Air Corps Advanced Flying School at Kelly Field, Texas, from 28 February to 17 May 1927. He returned to the 2nd Engineers, which was now located at Fort Sam Houston, Texas, but moved to Fort Logan, Colorado on 5 August 1927. His next assignment was with the 11th Engineer Regiment in the Panama Canal Zone, and he was involved in survey work in Nicaragua. He married Doris Reed from Denver at Corozal in the Panama Canal Zone on 2 December 1927. They had one child, a daughter, Jacqueline, who was born in 1935.

Returning to the United States in 1930, Plank was assigned to the Office of the District Engineer at Vicksburg, Mississippi from 2 October 1930 to 2 August 1931. He then became an instructor with the 120th Engineer Regiment, a New Mexico National Guard unit based at Las Cruces, New Mexico. On 7 January 1934, he joined the Office of the District Engineer at Fort Peck, Montana. After fifteen years as a lieutenant, he was promoted to captain on 1 August 1935.

== World War II ==
=== Airbase construction ===
Between 1 September 1939 and 4 February 1940, Plank attended the United States Army Command and General Staff College at Fort Leavenworth, Kansas. He then commanded the Topographic Company at Fort Benning, Georgia, where he was promoted to major on 1 July 1940. On 22 December 1940, he became the head of the National Defense Projects Branch in the Office of the Chief of Engineers in Washington, D.C. As such, he was responsible for the airbase construction program, which had recently been transferred to the Corps of Engineers from the Quartermaster Corps. Major Henry F. Hannis, a fellow member of the class of 1920 and a fellow graduate of Rensselaer Polytechnic Institute, served as the liaison with the United States Army Air Corps (USAAC).

"When we took over the air force construction from the Quartermaster, it was just simple chaos," Plank later noted. The Quartermaster Corps handed over blueprints and designs for airbases, but not basic engineering data and criteria for the design of paved runways, and designs for specialized Air Corps facilities was often lacking. Plank had to build a new organisation from scratch; it grew to a hundred people in six months. The effort was made possible through decentralization, with Plank leveraging the Corps of Engineers' division and district offices, who were given permission to approve contracts of up to $500,000 and $100,000 respectively. The head of the Air Corps' Building and Grounds Division, Colonel Frank M. Kennedy, had a policy of accepting tracts of land donated by local authorities for airbase construction. "How old do you have to be," Plank asked rhetorically, "to know what kind of land you get under those circumstances?"

Planned increases in the size of the size of the Air Corps expanded the program. A goal was announced of expanding the Air Corps to 84 groups, fed by a training program that would turn out 30,000 pilots a year. This necessitated the construction of two dozen new installations. By November 1941 the airbase construction program had grown to $708 million and was 66 percent complete, and airmen were occupying new facilities at 96 stations. On 16 December, all military construction, not just airbases, was assigned to the Corps of Engineers. The former Quartermaster Construction Division was merged with the groups engaged in construction at the Corps of Engineers. Plank was promoted to the rank of lieutenant colonel in the Army of the United States (AUS) on 11 December 1941, and became the head of Air Corps Projects Section, and now reported to Colonel Leslie Groves. That same day saw the German declaration of war against the United States, just four days after the Japanese attack on Pearl Harbor, which brought the United States into World War II.

=== European Theater ===
On 9 May 1942, Plank became the deputy chief of staff of the new European Theater of Operations, United States Army (ETOUSA) Services of Supply, under the command of Major General John C. H. Lee. This vast logistical organization became the Communications Zone, or Com-Z on D-Day. Plank was promoted to colonel (AUS) on 1 July 1942, and on 20 August he became chief of staff of the Eastern Base Section in the UK, which, due to its relative flatness and proximity to Germany, was chiefly involved in the construction and support of airbases. He succeeded Colonel Cecil R. Moore as its commander on 16 September. His permanent (Regular Army) rank of major was upgraded to lieutenant colonel on 2 July 1943.

Experience in Italy demonstrated the value of a logistical agency that worked closely with the army it was supporting, so in December 1943 an Advance Section (ADSEC) was organized under Plank's command; it was officially activated on 7 February 1944. In the initial stages of Operation Overlord, the Allied invasion of Normandy, ADSEC would be attached to the First Army, and would later take over the operation of base areas, supply dumps and communications from the First Army as it moved forward, the last Geographic Section of the Com-Z in support of advancing U.S. armies. By V-E Day there were ten Com-Z geographic sections. Plank was promoted to brigadier general (AUS) on 24 February 1944, and was awarded the Legion of Merit for his services as commander of the Eastern Base Section.

As the commander of ADSEC, Plank supported the operations of the First Army and then the 12th Army Group. Com-Z unloaded ships, built fuel pipelines, reconstructed railways, repaired bridges, and rehabilitated ports. ADSEC established supply dumps and depots, receiving all of this materiel as the last link in the chain of Service and Supply forces, and distributing it to the various combat units along an ever-widening front. During the period of the Allied advance from Paris to the Rhine, the Transportation Corps of the Com-Z ran the Red Ball Express to keep ADSEC and its customers supplied. When the Germans attacked in the Ardennes Offensive, ADSEC removed supplies from dumps and depots that were threatened, and supported the Third Army's counter-offensive. By this time, Com-Z and its final Advance Section were supporting over a million and a half combat soldiers. "I do not care who is right or who is wrong," Plank told his troops, "the point is that we have to satisfy our customers and do so in a way which pleases them."

For his service as commander of ADSEC, Plank was awarded the Distinguished Service Medal and two Bronze Star Medals. He also received foreign awards, including the Cross of Merit from Poland, Croix de Guerre from France and the Distinguished Service Medal from Greece. He was made a Commander of the Order of Leopold II by Belgium, a Commander of the Order of the British Empire by the UK, and a chevalier of the Officer of the Legion of Honor by France.

== Post-war ==
Plank was promoted to major general (AUS) on 7 June 1945. With the war in Europe over, he went to the South West Pacific Area, where he commanded the Philippine Base Section from 4 July to 10 October 45, and then Base X at Manila from 11 October 1945 to 26 February 1946, for which he was awarded an oak leaf cluster to his Army Distinguished Service Medal. He then returned to the United States, where he assumed command of the Transportation Corps Training Center at Fort Eustis, Virginia. His last command was of the New York Port of Embarkation, from 7 June 1946 to 31 May 1949, when he retired. He was reduced in his Regular Army rank to brigadier general on 24 January 1948 but was promoted to major general again in retirement on 1 June 1949.

In retirement, Plank became the deputy director of the Department of Finance, Support and Administrative Services of the International Refugee Organization in Geneva. After the Korean War broke out in 1950, he returned to the United States as a consultant to the Army in Washington, DC. From 1958 to 1963, he was the head of the Engineering Division of the California Disaster Office. He settled in San Francisco, where he died on 2 September 1982, and was interred in the Riverside National Cemetery. His papers are in the Hoover Institution Archives at Stanford University.

== Dates of rank ==
Insignia	Rank	Component	Date	Reference
	Second lieutenant	Coast Artillery Corps	2 July 1920	
	First lieutenant	Coast Artillery Corps	2 July 1920	
	First lieutenant	Corps of Engineers	4 September 1920	
	Second lieutenant	Corps of Engineers	15 December 1922	
	First lieutenant	Corps of Engineers	28 March 1925	
	Captain	Corps of Engineers	1 August 1935	
	Major	Corps of Engineers	1 July 1940	
	Lieutenant colonel	Army of the United States	11 December 1941	
	Colonel	Army of the United States	1 July 1942	
	Lieutenant colonel	Corps of Engineers	2 July 1943	
	Brigadier general	Army of the United States	24 February 1944	
	Major general	Army of the United States	7 June 1945	
	Brigadier general	Regular Army	24 January 1948	
	Brigadier general	Retired List	31 May 1949	
	Major general	Retired List	1 June 1949	
