= Theater Army Support Command, Europe =

US Army unit

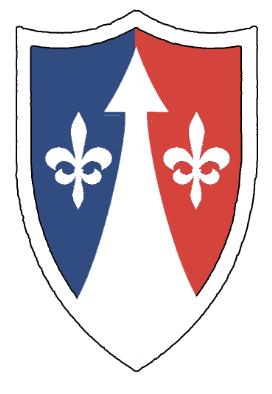
EUCOM COMZ SSI worn by COMZ 1953-1960 and later by TASCOM By 1961 TASCOM was using the insignia.

Theater Army Support Command, Europe (TASCOMEUR) was established on July 15, 1951, as a part of the European Command with its headquarters at Coligny Caserne, Orleans, France. It was first called EUCOM COMZ and had two major subdivisions BASEC (Base Section) and ADSEC (Advance Section) with headquarters in La Rochelle, France (BASEC) and Verdun, France (ADSEC). Its first commanding officer was Brigadier General Mason J. Young. The new command took over the COMZ-Europe and ADSEC from Services of Supply as the European Theater of Operations ceased and US Army, Europe (USAREUR) came into being. The new EUCOM COMZ was the result of the Berlin Blockade and the obvious need for additional lines of communication through France.

By 1958, the command was managing a large array of depots and ports throughout Germany and France.

The command grew during the years following until 1966 when France decided that all allied forces were to leave no later than April 1, 1967. After accomplishing Operation FRELOC (Fast Redeployment of the Lines of Communication), the command was redesignated as Theater Army Support Command, Europe (TASCOMEUR).

Finally, in July 1974, TASCOM merged with USAREUR.

== Subordinate Units (1969) ==
US Army Materiel Management Agency, Europe
15th Military Police Brigade
Combat Equipment Group, Europe
1st Support Brigade
NATO/SHAPE Support Group (US)
59th Ordnance Group
60th Ordnance Group
Procurement Agency, Europe
Postal Group, Europe

== Commanders ==
- Brigadier General Mason J. Young (April 1950 – March 1952)
- Major General Samuel D. Sturgis Jr. (March 1952 – March 1953)
- Major General Lemuel Mathewson (March 1953 – February 1954)
- Major General Philip E. Gallagher (February 1954 – March 1956)
- Major General Robert W. Colglazier Jr. (April 1956 – November 1957)
- Major General Edward J. O'Neill (November 1957 – September 1959)
- Major General Henry R. Westphalinger (September 1959 – October 1962)
- Major General Webster Anderson (November 1962 – April 1965)
- Major General Robert C. Kyser (June 1965 – January 1969)
- Major General Woodrow W. Vaughan (January 1969 – April 1969)
