= FECOMZ =

Military unit

FECOMZ is an acronym for "Forward Echelon, Communications Zone". FECOMZ was a headquarters, organized in World War II and authorized by the Allied Supreme Commander, to organize and control Services of Supply for the invasion forces after D-Day.

ADSEC was a movable base section organized under FECOMZ. FECOMZ reported to and was a separate command from the 12th Army Group that reported to directly SHAEF. This unit would coordinate until D+90 (approximately). Based on the D-Day date of June 6, 1944 this was about September 1944.
