= United States Army Services of Supply =

US Army logistics branch during WWII

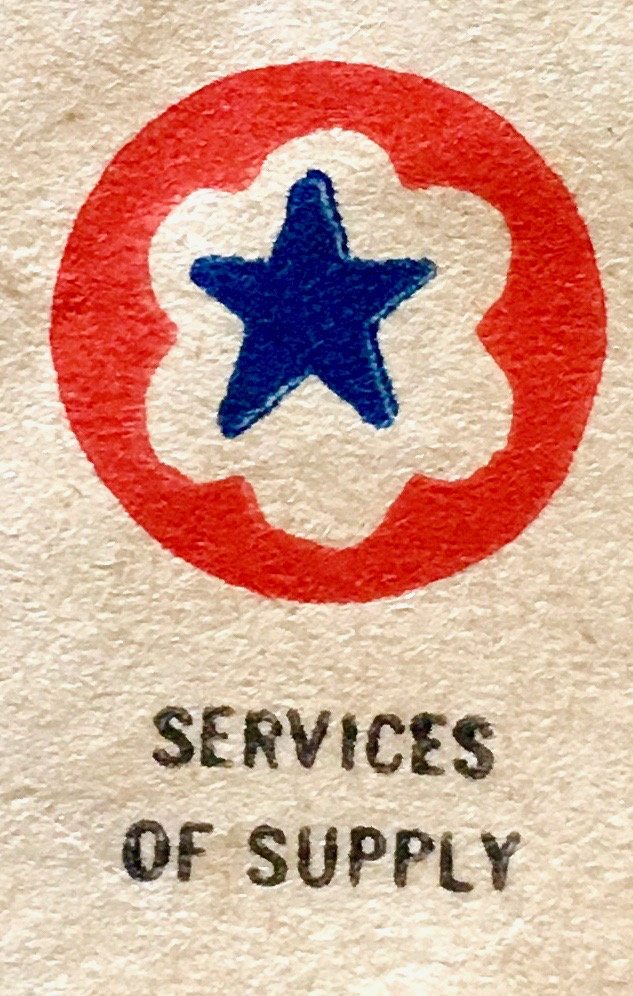
Services of Supply Insignia

The Services of Supply or "SOS" branch of the Army of the United States was created on 28 February 1942 by Executive Order Number 9082 "Reorganizing the Army and the War Department" and War Department Circular No. 59, dated 2 March 1942. Services of Supply became one of the three autonomous components of the Army of the United States on 9 March 1942. It was renamed the Army Service Forces on 12 March 1943, as it was felt that the term "supply" did not accurately describe its broad range of activities. From the day of inception (and even before) in 1942 through the end of WWII, the SOS/ASF was commanded by Lieutenant General (later General) Brehon B. Somervell.

Most theaters of war had their own logistical organization, usually also named the Services of Supply. The European Theater, and its SOS was subdivided into the ETO and the MTO (Mediterranean Theater of Operations) for the Operation Torch invasion of North Africa, then Sicily, then Italy, though the MTO was largely supplied by the SOS out of Great Britain. The SOS-ETO became TSF/ET (Theater Service Forces—European Theater) on D-Day, 6 June 1944, the term SOS was abolished, and its activities on the continent were referred to as COM-Z, or Communications Zone.

== Southwest Pacific Area ==
United States Army Services of Supply, Southwest Pacific Area (USASOS SWPA) in the South West Pacific Area were a direct outgrowth of the U.S. Army Forces in Australia (USAFIA), formed from command elements arriving in Australia with the Pensacola Convoy. They were commanded by Brigadier General Richard J. Marshall, and later Brigadier General J. L. Frink from September 1943. They were abolished in April 1945, and absorbed into Army Forces, Western Pacific (AFWESPAC).

== European Theater ==
The Services of Supply, European Theater of Operations (ETO), was established in Cheltenham, England on 24 May 1942 under the command of Major General John C. H. Lee. Almost two years of build up followed, supporting the North African Campaign and eventually the Invasion of Normandy. The command was redesignated COMZ (Communications Zone) after the 6 June 1944 invasion. Within COMZ was ADSEC (the Advance Section, Communications Zone) and FECOMZ (Forward Echelon, Communications Zone). This command was divided in the fall of 1942 to include service and supply functions in the North African Theater of Operations to support the Operation Torch invasion of North Africa, and the subsequent invasions of Sicily, Italy, and southern France. Lee's deputy, Brigadier General Thomas B. Larkin, was spun off from the SOS-ETO to direct this effort for the duration of the war, ending the conflict with the title Commanding General, Army Service Forces, Mediterranean Theater of Operations, United States Army. The development of telecommunications infrastructure in the region of Cheltenham was one of the major reasons why the GCHQ was moved to the town after American operations ceased.

== China-Burma-India Theater ==
The activation of Services of Supply, China, Burma and India (SOS CBI) was authorized by the War Department on 28 February 1942. The Headquarters and Headquarters Detachment (Provisional), SOS USAF CBI, was activated as a subordinate command of USAF CBI at Karachi, India, 23 April 1942. Headquarters, SOS USAF CBI, was initially located in Karachi but moved to New Delhi on 26 May 1942. It was commanded by Brigadier General Raymond A. Wheeler from 28 February 1942 (with the rank of major general from 11 March 1942); then Brigadier General William E. R. Covell from 15 November 1943 (with the rank of major general from 29 November 1943); Brigadier General John A Warden from 18 December 1944; and Major General William E. R. Covell from 10 February 1945. Services of Supply, China, Burma and India was redesignated Services of Supply, India Burma Theater (SOS IBT) on 2 November 1944 when the theater was split in two. On 10 November Advance Section No. 1, SOS IBT, was redesignated Supply, China Theater, with its headquarters at Kunming, China. It was commanded by Major General Gilbert X. Cheves from 12 November 1944, and Major General Henry S. Aurand from 25 May 45.

== See also ==
- Office of Naval Material

== General references ==
- Morton, Louis (1962). The War in the Pacific: Strategy and Command: The First Two Years (PDF). United States Army in World War II. Washington, D.C.: Center of Military History, United States Army. LCCN 61-60001. Archived from the original (PDF) on 27 September 2012.
- Roosevelt, Franklin D. (28 February 1942). "Executive Order 9082 Reorganizing the Army and the War Department". Executive Orders. The American Presidency Project, UC Santa Barbara.
- Stauffer, Alvin P. (1956). The Quartermaster Corps: Operations in the War Against Japan (PDF). United States Army in World War II. Washington, D.C.: Center of Military History, United States Army. LCCN 56-60001. Archived from the original (PDF) on 27 September 2012.
