= Communications zone =

Aspect of military theater of war operations

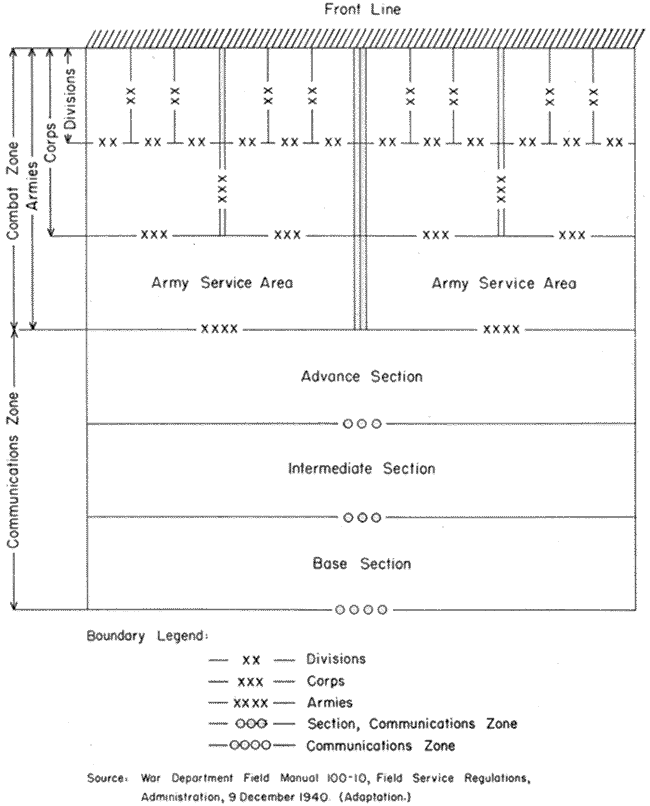
Typical organization of a theater of operations as envisaged by War Department Doctrine, 1940

Communications Zone is a US Army and NATO term which describes a part of the theater of war operations.

A communications zone is the rear part of theater of operations (behind but contiguous to the combat zone) which contains the lines of communications, establishments for supply and evacuation, and other agencies required for the immediate support and maintenance of the field forces.

== Communications Zones ==
=== Communications Zone, European Theater of Operations ===
The foundations of Communications Zone, European Theater of Operations (Com-Z-ETO) began on 3 May 1942, as part of the U. S. Army Services of Supply buildup of arms, fuels, and supplies in the ETO (SOS-ETO). In a briefing to Army Chief of Staff General George C. Marshall, overall SOS commander Lieutenant General Brehon B. Somervell recommended SOS-ETO be commanded by Major General John C. H. Lee, commander of the then-Texas based 2nd Infantry Division; Somervell had served under Lee in the 89th Infantry Division in World War I. General Marshall gave the assignment to Lee, who then spent two weeks in Washington selecting key staff and planning the Operation Bolero buildup of men and materiel in Britain. This buildup work continued through and supported the invasions of North Africa, Sicily, Italy, and into western France. On D-Day (6 June 1944), with combat forces now engaged across the entire Theater, the SOS-ETO title was abolished, becoming the Com-Z-ETO. Lee commanded the largest single unit in WWII outside the United States; over 930,000 men and women by V-E Day, 8 May 1945, delivering over 41 million tons of arms, fuels, and supplies to the continent. Days after Germany surrendered, the Com-Z was again renamed the Theater Service Forces-European Theater, TSF/ET, though it maintained the same command and structure. Their first priority was shipping materiel and combat units to the Pacific Theater of Operations (PTO) as the invasion of Japan, slated for September 1945, was still the operational plan - until the atomic bombings in August 1945 ended the war. Then the main functions became shipping almost three million GI's home, securing millions of weapons, defusing or destroying massive stocks of ordnance, restoring infrastructure, and feeding and transporting millions of displaced civilians and German combatants across a decimated continent. Lee remained in his command until 31 December 1945 when he was reassigned to command the Mediterranean Theater of Operations, United States Army, where he would perform the same wind-down functions until September 1947. Com-Z-ETO would become EUCOM COMZ in July 1951.

=== Korean Communications Zone (KCOMZ) ===
The Korean Communications Zone, abbreviated to KComZ or KCOMZ, was operated by the United States military during the Korean War.

== See also ==
- Civil affairs
- Military aid to the civil power
