= American logistics in the Western Allied invasion of Germany =

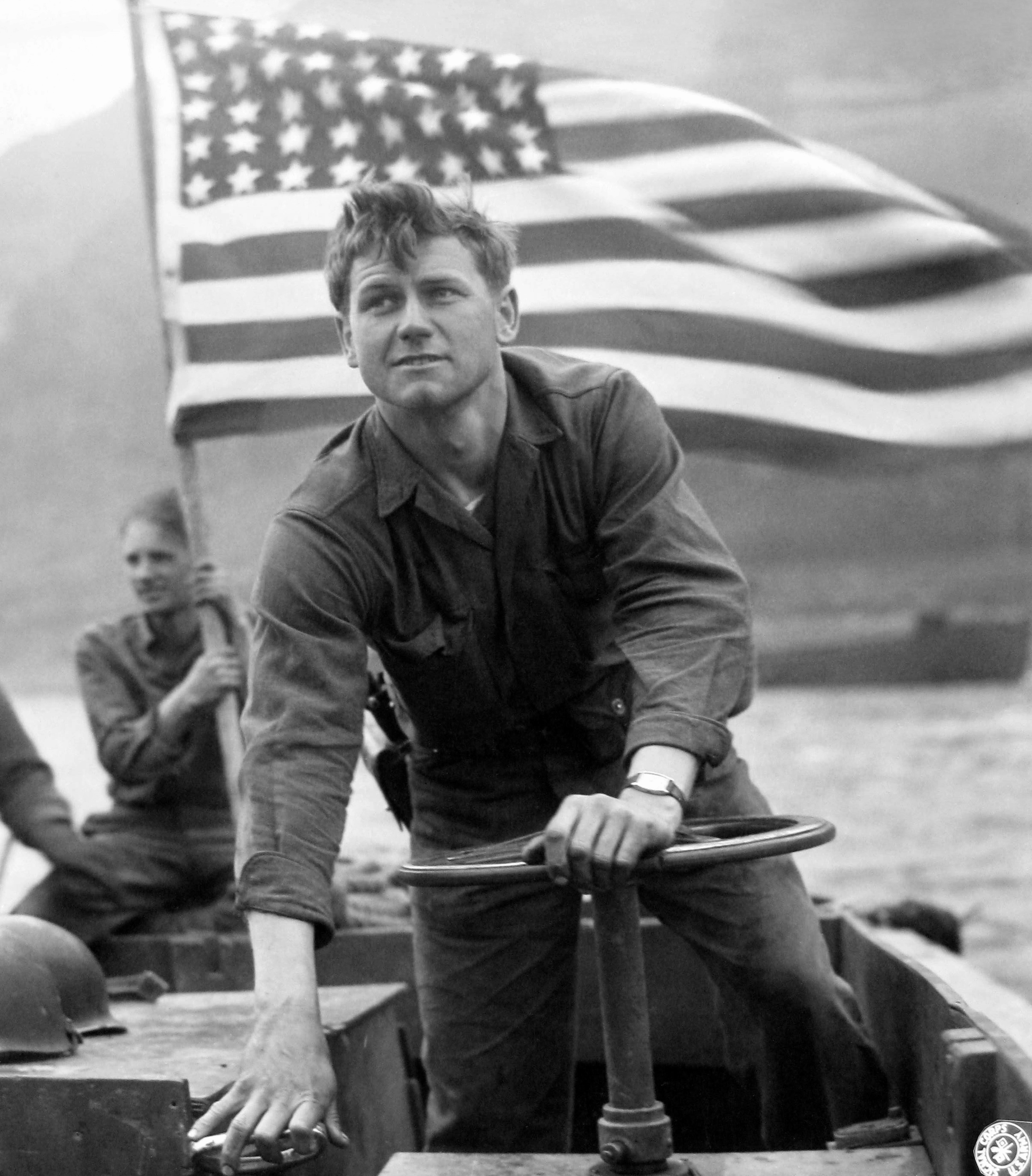
The U.S. Navy ferries troops across the Rhine at Oberwesel.

American logistics supported the Western Allies in their invasion of Germany, the final campaign of the Second World War's western front in the European Theater of Operations. The campaign lasted from 26 January 1945 until the end of World War II in Europe on 8 May 1945. (Note: Officially, the US Army designates the campaign from 15 September 1944 to 21 March 1945 as "Rhineland" and that from 22 March 1945 to 11 May 1945 as "Central Europe". The former brackets the "Ardennes-Alsace" campaign, which ran from 16 December 1944 to 25 January 1945.)

By the end of January 1945, the American forces had recovered from the disruption to the supply system and the large losses of materiel inflicted by the German offensives in the Ardennes and Alsace. Sixty-eight ships loaded with replacement ordnance were dispatched from the United States. Casualties were harder to replace, and about 49,000 men were transferred from service units to the infantry branch. The Allied forces had to advance across the Rhineland, which was in the grip of thaws, rains and floods. They were then confronted by the Rhine, the most formidable barrier to the Allied advance since the English Channel. The river was crossed and bridged, and railways and pipelines were run across it. Most supplies were delivered by rail, and five railway bridges over the Rhine supported the final American advance into the heart of Germany.

Once across the Rhine, combat losses in terms of tanks, vehicles and equipment, and the expenditure of ammunition declined, while shortages of fuel and spare parts developed, as was to be expected in fast-moving mobile operations. The American logistics system was stretched, but came nowhere near breaking point. The railheads were pushed forward, the rehabilitation of the network keeping pace with the advance. No less than twenty-six engineer general service regiments worked on the railways, and by late April rail had supplanted motor transport and was carrying the bulk of supplies across the Rhine. By 8 May, when the war in Europe ended, railheads had been established at Stendal, Magdeburg, Leipzig, Regensburg and Stuttgart in Germany. The Motor Transport Service organized XYZ, an express road service that moved supplies from the railheads to the forward units. Air supply also played its part in bringing the campaign to a successful conclusion, with a substantial amount of gasoline delivered by air in the final weeks.

== Background ==
The campaign in Northwest Europe had commenced on 6 June 1944 (D-Day), with Operation Overlord, the Allied Normandy landings. By early September, the Allied forces had reached the Dutch and German borders in the north and the Moselle in the south, but the advance came to a halt due to logistical difficulties, particularly fuel shortages, and stiffening German resistance. Between September and November, the American forces in Northwest Europe were beset by severe difficulties with port discharge capacity and inland transportation infrastructure that only eased with the opening of the port of Antwerp in Belgium in November. The American forces were then engulfed by the German offensives in the Ardennes and Alsace in December 1944 and January 1945.

With the German offensives dealt with, the Supreme Allied Commander, General of the Army Dwight D. Eisenhower, planned to reach and cross the Rhine. He chose to make the main Allied effort in the north. There were tactical, operational and political reasons for this: the best crossing sites were there; a crossing in the north gave access to the North German Plain, where the terrain was best suited for mobile warfare, for which his Allied forces were particularly trained and equipped; and it had the political advantage of involving the British and Canadians. After some debate, the Combined Chiefs of Staff endorsed Eisenhower's strategy at the Malta Conference in January and February 1945.

== Organization ==
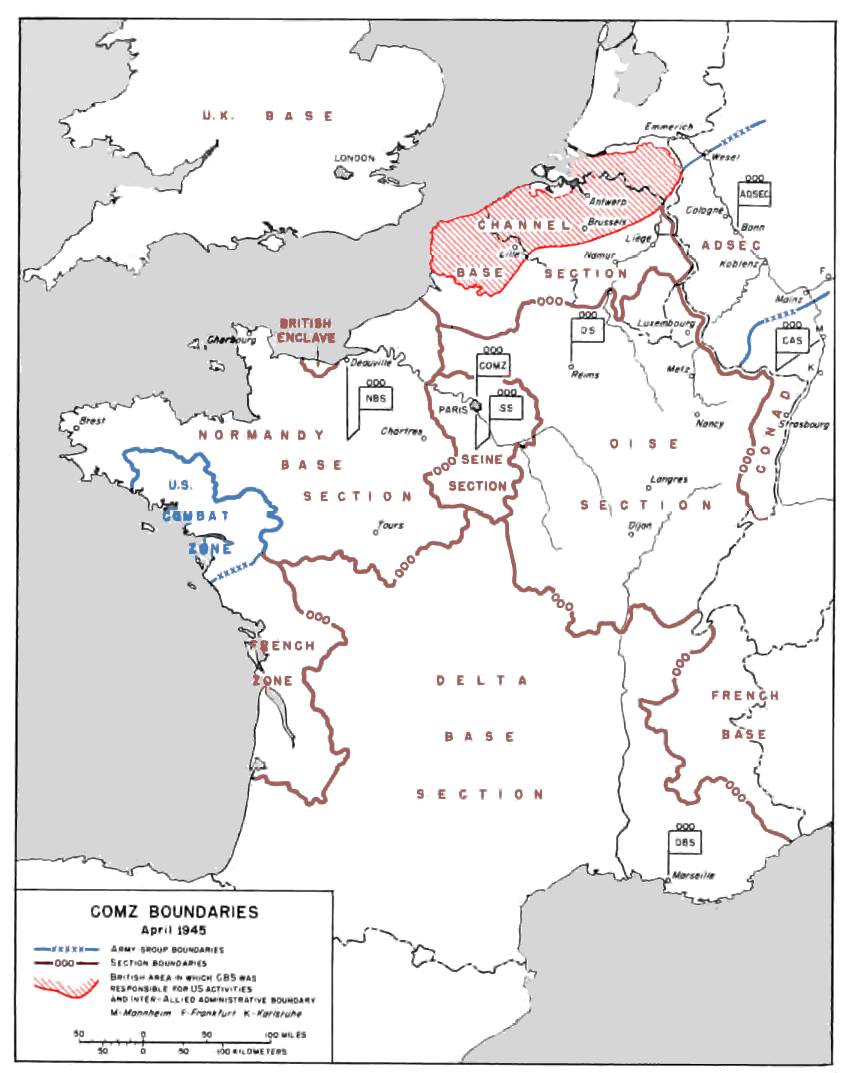
Communications Zone boundaries April 1945

In January 1945, there were five American armies in Northwest Europe. Lieutenant General Courtney Hodges's First and Lieutenant General William H. Simpson's Ninth Armies were serving as part of Field Marshal Sir Bernard Montgomery's British 21st Army Group. The First Army returned to Lieutenant General Omar N. Bradley's 12th Army Group on 18 January 1945, but the Ninth did not return to the 12th Army Group until 4 April. While under the operational control of the 21st Army Group, their administrative control remained with the 12th Army Group. The 12th Army Group also included Lieutenant General Leonard T. Gerow's Fifteenth Army and Lieutenant General George S. Patton Jr.'s Third Army. In the south, Lieutenant General Jacob L. Devers's 6th Army Group controlled Lieutenant General Alexander Patch's Seventh Army along with the French First Army. Devers kept his headquarters down to around 600 personnel, while Bradley's was more than twice the size, with enough officers to staff an infantry division. This was primarily due to the 12th Army Group assuming logistical responsibilities, something which ran counter to US Army doctrine.

Logistical support of the American forces was the responsibility of Lieutenant General John C. H. Lee's Communications Zone (COMZ). COMZ headquarters doubled as that of the European Theater of Operations, United States Army (ETOUSA). It was the senior US headquarters in the theater, but the operational functions of a US general headquarters were exercised by Eisenhower's Supreme Headquarters, Allied Expeditionary Force (SHAEF). In administrative matters, the staff of ETOUSA, and the chiefs of the services in particular, were supreme. In a dispute between the service chief of the armies or army groups and the one at COMZ, the latter could appeal to the ETOUSA service chief, who was himself. This was resented by the staffs of the armies and army groups, who felt that ETOUSA favored COMZ.

The Advance Section (ADSEC) followed closely behind the armies to develop the lines of communication, take over forward dumps and depots from the armies as they advanced, and coordinate the activities with COMZ and the armies. The forces in southern France had their own line of communication from the Mediterranean Theater of Operations, United States Army (MTOUSA), with their own advance section, the Continental Advance Section (CONAD), and base section, the Delta Base Section. By February 1945, the integration of the Southern Line of Communications (SOLOC) with COMZ had progressed to the point where the SOLOC was superfluous, and it was abolished on 6 February. CONAD and the Delta Base Section then came directly under COMZ. The commander of SOLOC, Major General Thomas B. Larkin, became the deputy commander of COMZ on 12 March, and on 9 April he succeeded Brigadier General Royal B. Lord as chief of staff of COMZ and deputy chief of staff of ETOUSA.

The base sections were divided into districts. The base sections in the UK became Western, Southern and London districts of the UK Section. When the COMZ Loire Base Section was absorbed by the Brittany Base Section on 1 December 1944, it became the Loire district. Similarly, when in turn it was absorbed by the Normandy Base Section on 1 February 1945, it became the Brittany district. Henceforth, COMZ consisted of the two advance sections (ADSEC and CONAD), the three base sections controlling the ports (the Delta, Normandy and Channel Base Sections), and the UK, Seine and Oise Sections.

== Situation in January 1945 ==
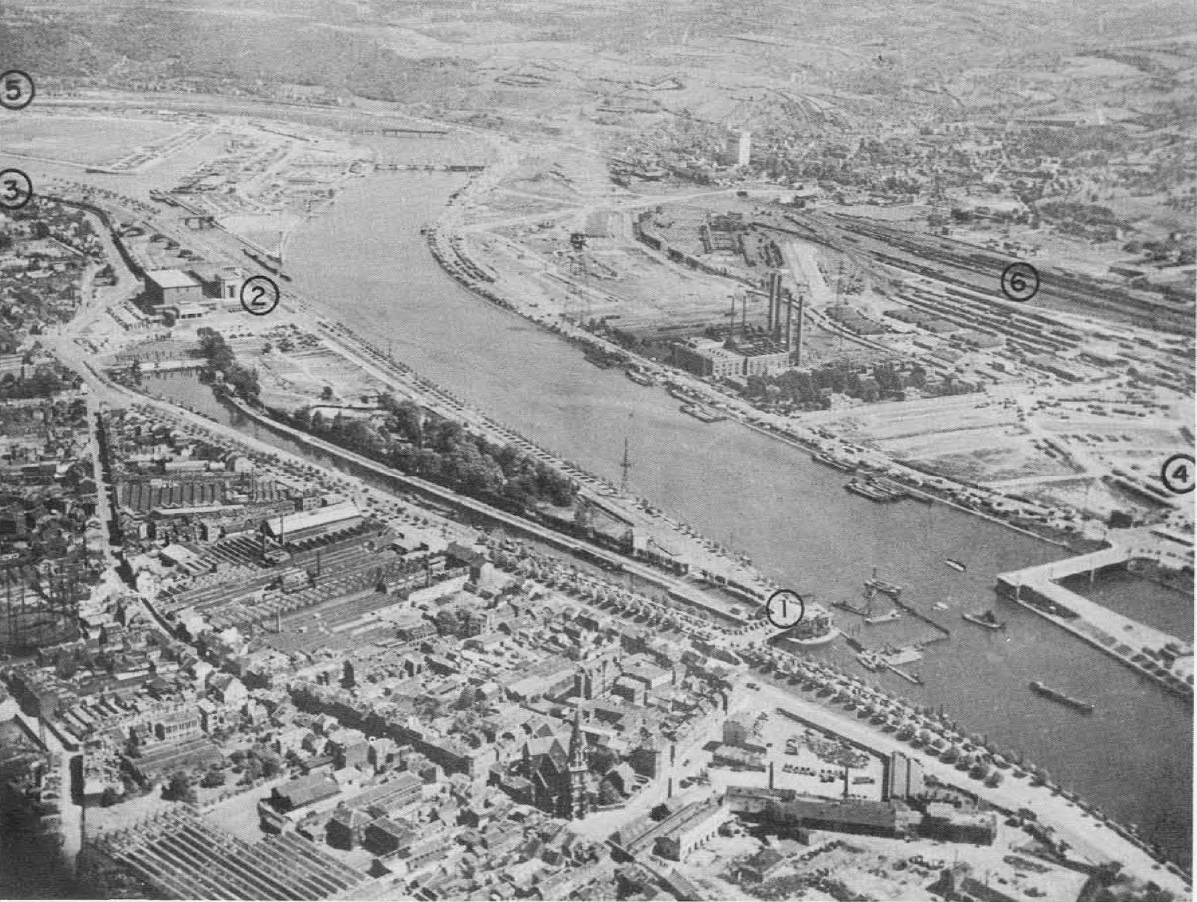
Aerial view of storage areas at Liège

=== Effect of the Ardennes-Alsace battles on logistics ===
The opening of the port of Antwerp on 28 November 1944 ended the transportation difficulties related to port capacity that had dogged the American forces in the autumn. Major depot areas had been established around Liège, Belgium, to support the First and Ninth Armies, and Verdun, France, to support the Third Army. The Liège area was chosen for its accessibility by rail, and by barge via the Meuse. On one side of the river there was storage space for 120,000 long tons (122,000 t) of subsistence; the other side had facilities for the storage of 41,000 long tons (42,000 t) of petroleum, oil and lubricants (POL). The former had sidings for unloading 466 railway cars, and the latter for 352. There was closed storage for 3,200 long tons (3,300 t) of subsistence, and cold storage for 450 long tons (460 t). In contrast, Verdun was not a single complex, but a cluster of eight subsistence and eight fuel depots that held up to 14,000,000 US gallons (53,000,000 L) of fuel and cold storage for 1,900 long tons (1,900 t) of subsistence. It employed 315 German prisoners of war (POWs) and 2,000 Polish displaced persons.

The German Ardennes offensive disrupted the American supply arrangements. The movement of supplies to the depots around Liège, which were threatened by the German advance, had to be halted, and the unloading of ships at Antwerp had to be curtailed. Only 130 ships were unloaded in December, and on 23 December ETOUSA requested that 24 ships be cut from upcoming convoys. The Germans cut the main rail link between Antwerp and the Third Army depots, so alternative routes were developed. ADSEC units south of the German advance found themselves cut off. This included engineer units that became engaged in laying land mines, carrying out demolitions and fighting delaying actions. Some of the truck drivers who had helped move the 101st Airborne Division found themselves cut off in Bastogne, Belgium, and fought as infantry.

Stockpiles from threatened dumps and depots in the First and Third Army areas were back hauled to COMZ dumps by rail, so not only were unloadings held up, but freight cars had to be diverted to the forward areas to evacuate supplies. At Liège, tanker trucks took away 400,000 US gallons (1,500,000 L) of aviation gasoline, about half of the POL stock. The Third Army lost 100,000 US gallons (380,000 L) through air raids, and air raids and V-1 flying bomb attacks on ADSEC installations resulted in the loss of 900,000 US gallons (3,400,000 L). By the end of December, the First Army's stocks of POL had dropped from nearly 3,500,000 US gallons (13,000,000 L) to less than 400,000 US gallons (1,500,000 L). Supply trains and railway installations came under attack from the Luftwaffe, resulting in casualties and damage. A particular concern was the railway bottleneck around Liège, which was highlighted by damage to the Renory Viaduct by bombing in December and January. A new railway bridge was built over the Meuse at Maastricht in the Netherlands to provide an alternative route, but was not required.

With the army dumps being evacuated, the ADSEC depots began issuing supplies directly to the operational units. To relieve the congestion at the port caused by ships being unloaded without the ability to forward their contents, COMZ sought to acquire depot space around Antwerp. This was resisted by the British, who pointed to the original agreement that had been hammered out when the US forces had been granted access to the port. They relented under pressure from SHAEF, and allowed US depots to be established in France around Lille and Charleroi. POL shipments from Antwerp were consigned to Lille, and rations were sent to Charleroi.

=== Equipment loss and replacement ===
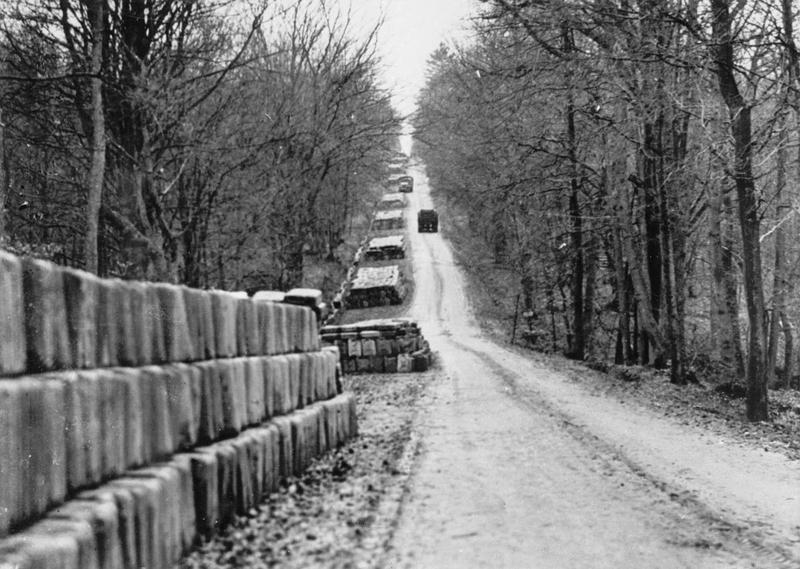
Fuel dump near Stavelot, Belgium

The tactical situation resulted in requests for large quantities of barbed wire, land mines, small arms ammunition, anti-tank rockets and demolition charges. Some 500,000 land mines were sent forward. The First Army alone used 186,000 anti-tank mines and 745,830 pounds (338,300 kg) of explosives in late December and early January to establish a series of defenses between the Ardennes and Liège. All available machine gun ammunition in the COMZ depots was dispatched, but still could not meet demand. Two ships loaded with anti-tank rockets and small arms ammunition were called forward and given top priority for discharge. The ammunition unloaded was moved to forward depots as rapidly as possible.

Ammunition expenditure soared. First Army's expenditure of 105 mm howitzer rose to 69 rounds per gun per day in December, easily exceeding its previous record of 44 rounds per gun per day in November. In December, the armies expended 2,579,400 rounds of 105 mm howitzer high explosive shell, and the theater stocks were reduced to 2,524,000 rounds, compared to an authorized stock level of 8,900,000 rounds. Expenditure of 155 mm howitzer ammunition was also high. To alleviate ammunition shortages, the 12th Army Group borrowed one hundred 25-pounder (88 mm) gun-howitzers with 300,000 rounds from the British.

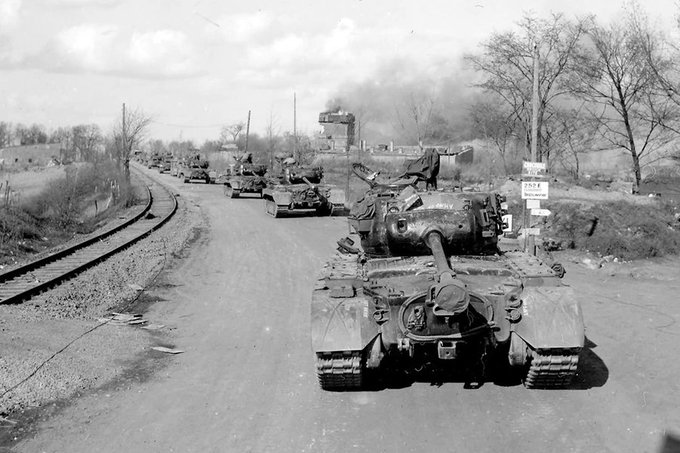
A convoy of M26 Pershing tanks moves through a German town.

The American forces lost nearly 400 tanks in December. MTOUSA loaned 150 tanks (Note: 75 of these were already in Marseille) and the British 21st Army Group loaned 351 M4 Sherman tanks from their stocks (the British had higher reserves proportionally with 1,900 Shermans -supplied under Lend-Lease - in the UK). It was decided to allocate the entire American production to the US forces until they built up a reserve of 2,000 tanks over four months. Nonetheless, all combat vehicles destroyed in battle were replaced by the middle of January. The supply of Shermans was sufficient for all four armies to request that no more should be shipped with the 75 mm gun and only those with the 76 mm gun should be sent from then on but 76-mm Shermans were delayed by changes in design and work on the 90mm gun tank. Improved (HVAP) ammunition for the tanks was shipped but at an average rate of two rounds per gun By April, holdings of Shermans reached the number authorized by the War Department: 7,779.

Meanwhile, the New York Port of Embarkation (NYPOE) began shipping the new M26 Pershing heavy tank to the ETO in January 1945. A shipment of 157 Pershing tanks left the United States on 23 March, by which time another 53 were either at port or en route. The Third Army had not yet received any by April, and although the Ninth Army had received nineteen by the end of March, none had been issued to the troops due to lack of time to train crews in their operation. More arrived in the last two weeks of April, so the Third Army had ninety by the end of the month. By V-E Day (8 May) there were 310 Pershing tanks in the theater, of which about 200 had been issued to troops.

Losses of Browning Automatic Rifles, 60 mm mortars and light machine guns were all made good by mid-January. Sixty-eight ships loaded with replacement ordnance were dispatched from the United States in January. By 21 February 1945, in spite of the fighting in Alsace and the renewed advance to the Rhine, the armies' depots held 114,535 long tons (116,373 t) of ammunition, and the ADSEC forward depots held 275,136 long tons (279,551 t).

=== Transportation ===
In early February, for the first time there were more ships being worked at the ports than awaiting discharge, and by the end of the month less than a hundred were awaiting discharge. By the end of March, that number had fallen to fifty-seven. Additional capacity at the port made unloadings more efficient, as the best possible port and berth could be assigned. In turn this improved turnaround time for the trucks and trains.

During February, the First Army moved stores back across the Meuse to the sites used before the German Ardennes offensive, and established a new fuel decanting point at Stolberg, Germany. The ability of ADSEC to deliver supplies direct to the corps and divisions by rail eased the pressure on its motor transport, and allowed it to build up a reserve of 4.5 days' supply of rations, 6 days' supply of fuel, and 45,549 long tons (46,280 t) of ammunition by 22 February.

In January, a rapid express shipping service known as REX was instituted for high priority cargo required for combat operations. The first REX shipment left the United States in March, and by V-E Day, when the service was discontinued, about 120,000 long tons (120,000 t) had been dispatched in REX shipments, of which about 90 percent was ordnance and signal supplies.

A daily express rail service known as the "Toot Sweet Express" was inaugurated in January to carry high priority freight. Most of it came from depots and manufacturers in the United States, sent across the Atlantic by expedited sea or air movement. The Toot Sweet Express ran from Cherbourg to Paris, and thence to the forward ADSEC depots. It started at Cherbourg with twenty cars, and collected up to twenty more in Paris. Two trains were then assembled, one bound for Liège and the other for Bad Kreuznach, Germany. By 13 March, each Toot Sweet Express was full to capacity, carrying a daily average of 385 long tons (391 t). Shipping mail on these well-guarded trains reduced transit times and instances of pilferage. (Note: In February 1945, two officers and 158 enlisted men of the 716th Railway Operating Battalion were convicted of black marketing fuel and cigarettes. Their commanding officer was acquitted and returned to the United States.)

== Personnel problems ==
=== Balancing the troop basis ===
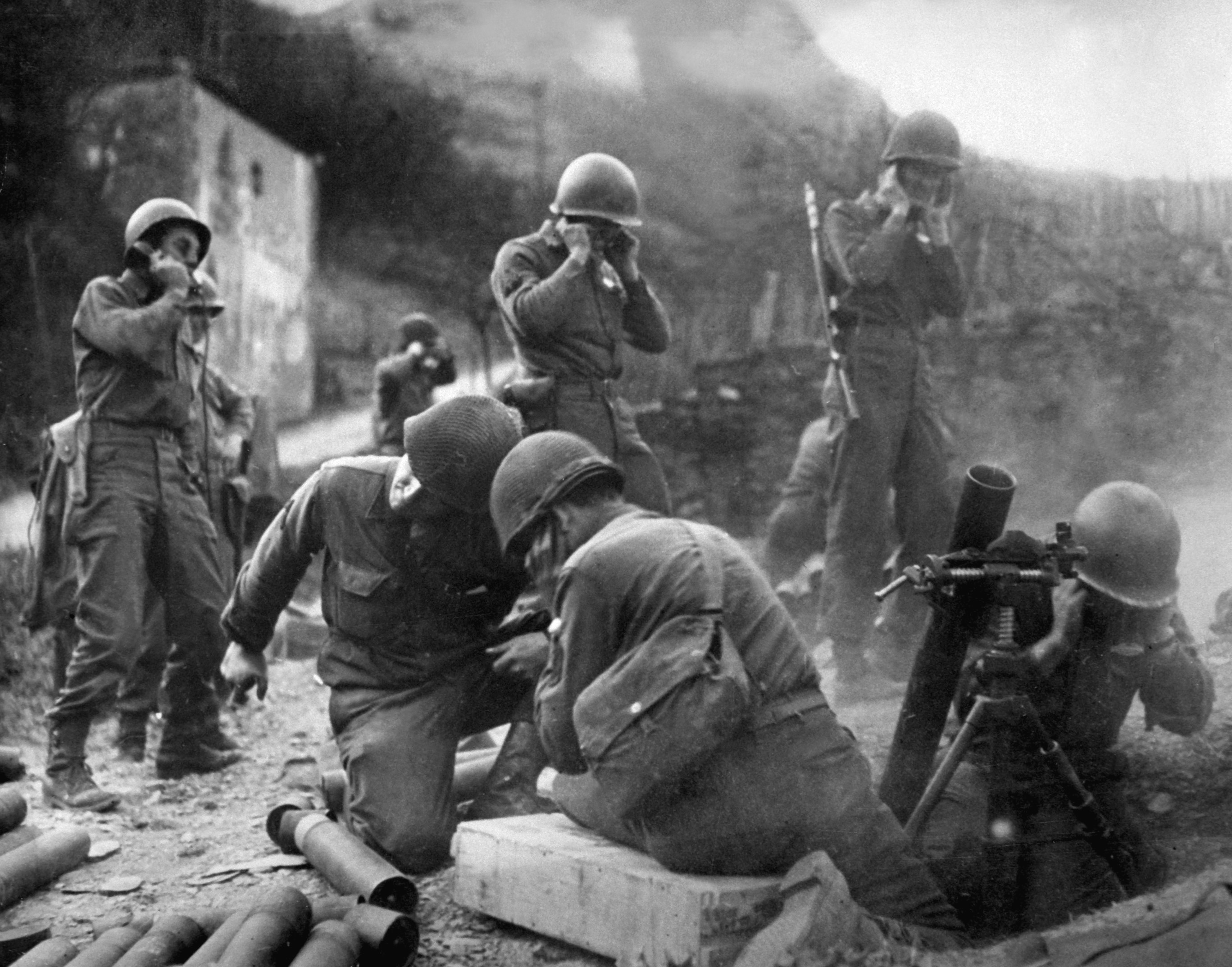
American mortar crew in action near the Rhine

On 31 December 1944, ETOUSA had 52 divisions and 1,392,100 troops in combat support and service units. The theater had an authorized strength of 1,535,600 in combat support and service units, and it was planned to increase the number of divisions in the ETO to 61. In the original planning for the campaign, the War Department had reckoned on a division slice of 40,000, of whom 15,000 would be in the division itself, 15,000 in corps and army units, and 10,000 in the Communications Zone.

This allocation was divided among the services to produce a troop basis. It was difficult to predict what units would be required, so shortages of some types and surpluses of others developed. This resulted in units being deployed on tasks for which they were neither organized nor trained, and some had to be converted to other types or broken up to provided personnel for more sorely needed units. The advance across France in 1944 had absorbed much of the ETO's surplus manpower in augmenting truck companies to permit them to operate around the clock, and sixteen additional military police battalions had been activated to handle the large number of German POWs.

In addition to the five American armies, support had to be provided to the French First Army, which had insufficient logistical units. In December 1944, SOLOC had 106,464 service troops, of whom 18,300 were French and 88,164 American, to support eight French and nine American divisions, which gave the forces in the south a division slice of only 6,262 service troops. This was not counting 20,000 men in Italian service units, which Larkin argued were less efficient than French and American troops. Four American divisions were added to the 6th Army Group in December, and more French ones were scheduled. Combat units were transferred to the 6th Army Group for the Colmar Pocket operations in January and February 1945, along with 12,000 additional service troops.

To supply 123,000 service troops to support the nine additional divisions, the War Department inactivated anti-aircraft battalions, which were no longer required, but it balked at providing 16,000 additional truck drivers unless the theater offered compensating reductions. The field forces were willing to accept fewer combat units in return for more service and support units, and acquiesced to a cut of ten field artillery battalions in return for the additional truck drivers. This was a difficult decision: these units would be needed if heavy German resistance developed, but there was a shortage of artillery ammunition, and it was thought that by the time they arrived the fighting would have moved into a mobile phase where truck drivers would be more valuable. Bradley even offered to accept the inactivation of the 20th Armored Division, which was scheduled for shipment to the ETO in February.

=== Replacing casualties ===
American battle casualties in the November fighting were much greater than anticipated, and there was a higher rate of nonbattle casualties as well, largely as a result of cold injuries such as trench foot and frostbite. In 1944–1945, there were 71,038 cold injury cases in the American forces in the ETO, compared to 206 cases in the British and Canadian armies. Both battle and nonbattle casualties fell disproportionately on the infantry branch, who accounted for an estimated 80 percent of them. The War Department said it could not supply enough replacements from the United States, and that the theater would run out of infantry replacements if casualties were as high in December. In fact, they were even higher, due to the German Ardennes offensive. Bradley was disturbed at the number of infantry replacements being sent to the Pacific, where the need was also acute. "Don't they realize", he asked Eisenhower rhetorically, "that we can still lose this war in Europe?".

One source of additional infantry replacements was infantry serving in the Communications Zone. There were three infantry regiments (the 29th, 118th and 156th Infantry Regiments) assigned to the Communications Zone for guard duties. A program was initiated in early December 1944 under which sixty percent of their personnel were to be given three weeks' refresher training and released into the replacement stream. A similar twelve-week training course was instituted to retrain replacements for other branches and services as infantry. In January 1945, as the situation became dire, the three weeks of retraining for men released from the three infantry regiments was reduced to one, and the retraining for other branches was shortened to four weeks.

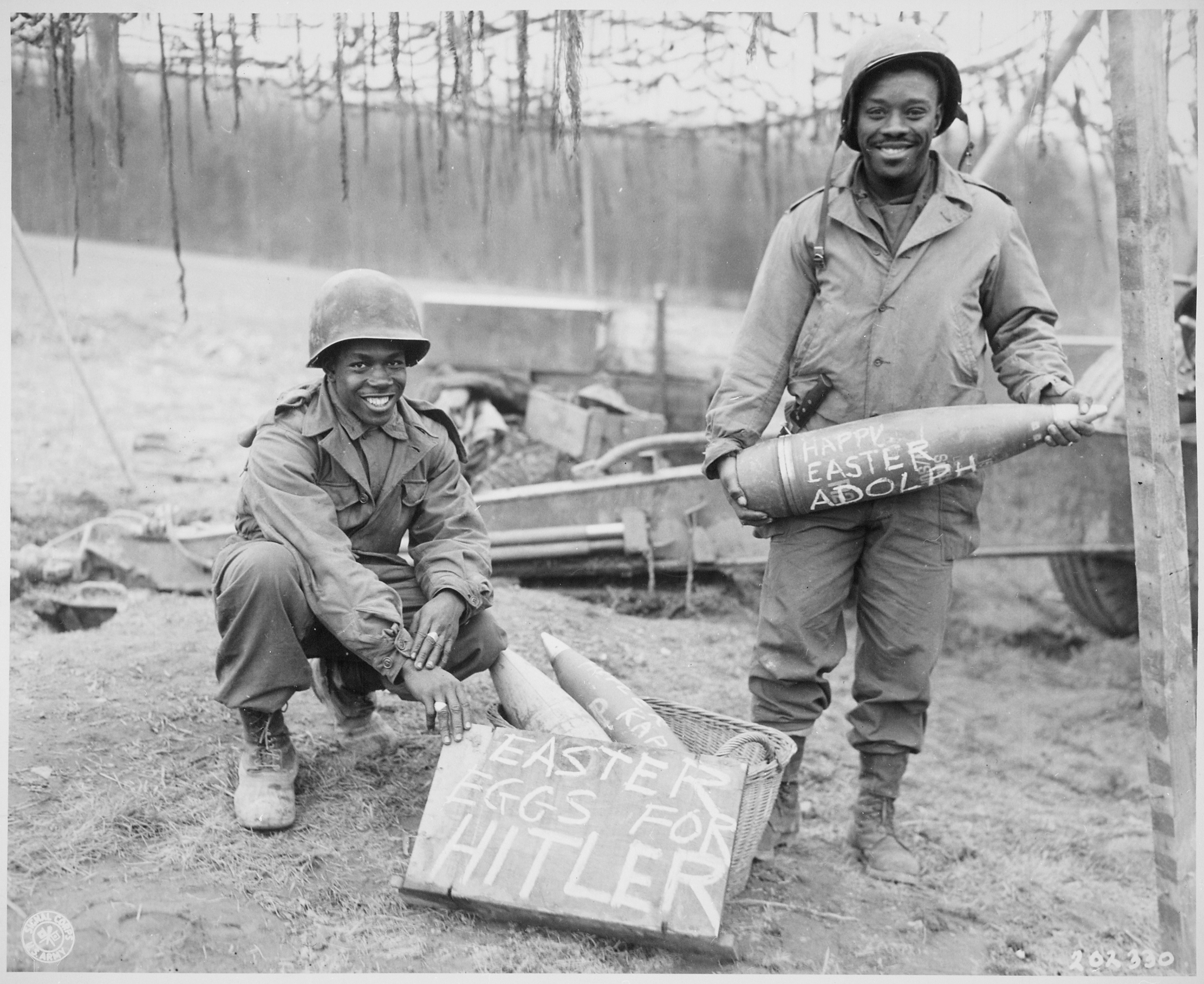
African American troops celebrate Easter on 1 April 1945.

On 26 December, SHAEF put out a theater-wide appeal for volunteers to join the infantry. Among those who did so were 4,562 African American soldiers, many of whom accepted a reduction in rank to qualify, as only privates were eligible. The Army remained racially segregated, so they were used to form fifty-three infantry platoons. SHAEF announced that all physically qualified men serving in noncombat units were eligible for retraining as infantry except for combat medics and those with highly specialized skills. On 1 January 1945, Lee assigned quotas to the COMZ sections to provide 21,000 men over the following five weeks. The War Department was asked to provide 25,000 limited service men to replace them. (Note: I.e., men with minor physical defects that disqualified them for general military service, but who could still perform a limited range of duties.)

Casualties remained high in January, but by March the measures taken to address the replacement shortage began to have an effect, and casualties, while still high, were lower than anticipated, so a surplus of infantry replacements began to accumulate. By April, there was an excess of 50,000 infantrymen in the replacement system. Partially retrained infantrymen were assigned to military police, anti-aircraft and heavy artillery units used to guard POWs and control displaced persons, and the War Department diverted 19,000 infantry replacements scheduled for shipment to Europe in May to the Pacific.

Meanwhile, a shortage of 20,000 men developed in the other arms and services. The ADSEC commander, Brigadier General Ewart G. Plank reported that his white units were understrength by an average of 16 percent, and some by as much as 34 percent. There was little hope that additional service troops could be provided. Shortages of service personnel were addressed through greater utilization of civilians and POWs. About 49,000 men were transferred from COMZ between 1 February and 30 April, when SHAEF suspended the program. About half of them completed their retraining before the war in Europe ended on 8 May.

== Planning and preparations for the Rhine crossing ==
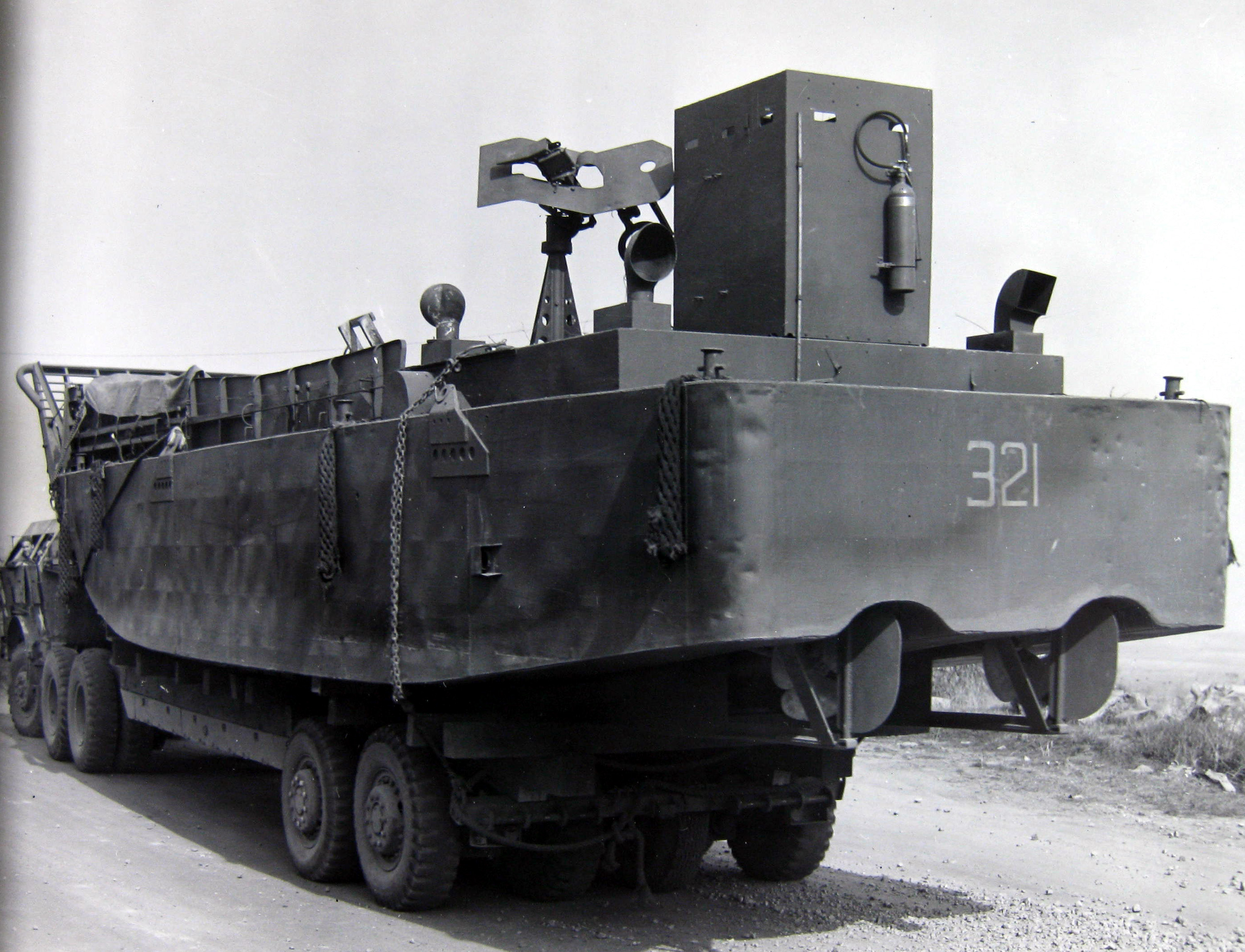
A Third Army flatbed truck carries a Navy Landing Craft Mechanized (LCM) to the Rhine.

The Rhine constituted the most formidable barrier to the Allied advance since the English Channel. Planning for the crossing of the Rhine had begun in September 1944. The SHAEF staff studied three possible crossing areas in Germany: Emmerich–Wesel, Cologne–Koblenz, and Frankfurt–Mannheim. The Emmerich–Wesel sector north of the Ruhr was preferred, and was the only one mentioned in Eisenhower's 8 January 1945 directive, but the possibility of a smaller, subsidiary operation in one or both of the other sectors was considered. The main logistical problem with a river crossing was that the site would inevitably become a transportation bottleneck.

The SHAEF planners estimated that 15 British or Canadian and 21 American divisions could be supported in the northern sector, based on a maintenance of 600 long tons (610 t) per division slice per day. A key decision was to lay pipelines across the river to provide three-quarters of the petrol, oil and lubricant (POL) requirements of the forces on the east bank. This was considered risky in Germany due to the danger of sabotage, but POL accounted for at least a third of the armies' tonnage requirements, and the consequent savings in traffic over the bridges would be substantial. The 12th Army Group headquarters anticipated having pipelines over the Rhine in operation three weeks after crossing the river. It did not count on the railways being operational east of the Rhine until nine weeks after crossing.

In September 1944, anticipating the Rhine would soon be reached, Bradley asked the US Navy for assistance. Four boat units, each with 24 landing craft, vehicle, personnel (LCVP), were formed under the command of Commander William J. Whiteside, one each for the First, Third and Ninth Armies, plus a reserve unit, and were transported from the UK to Le Havre, France, on the British dock landing ships HMS Oceanway and Northway and 45 of the larger landing craft mechanized (LCM) were later attached to the task group.

Transporting the LCVPs overland presented few problems, as they could be carried by a heavy ponton trailer. The LCMs presented more of a challenge, as they were too wide for Bailey bridges and for two-way traffic on most roads. The LCMs for the First and Ninth Armies made their way from Antwerp to Maastricht via the Albert Canal, but those assigned to the Third Army had to travel overland from Le Havre. They had to be carried by M25 tank transporters. Their height was reduced from 17 feet 6 inches (5.33 m) to 15 feet 11 inches (4.85 m) by removing some of the protective armor on the operator tower. In some cases, the corners of buildings were blown off to allow the LCMs to pass. To get them on and off the tank transporters required two 2-cubic-yard (1.5 m^{3}) mobile cranes.

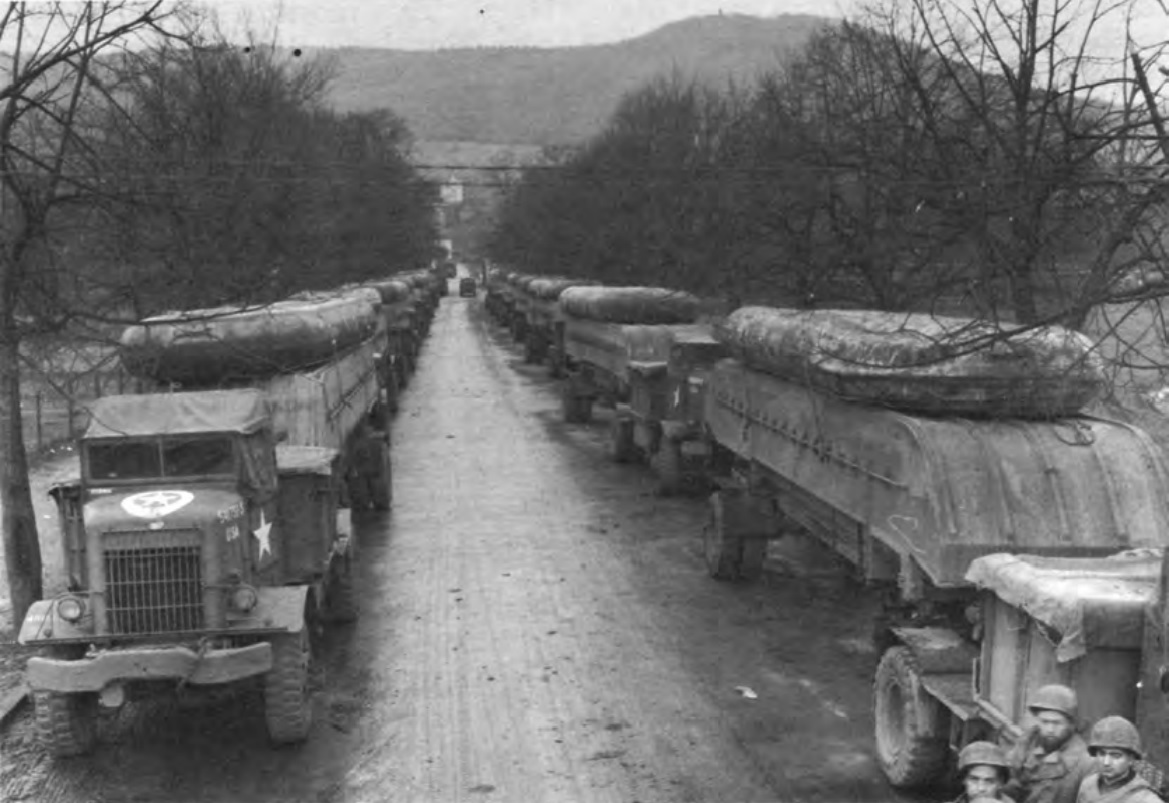
Heavy pneumatic pontons move up to Remagen.

The ETO Chief Engineer, Major General Cecil R. Moore, held a meeting of the chief engineers of the major headquarters in October 1944 to discuss the engineering issues involved in crossing the Rhine. A long list of bridging and construction materials was drawn up, which included steel beams up to 92 feet (28 m) long and 3 feet (0.91 m) wide, and pilings up to 100 feet (30 m) long. As with the LCMs, careful planning was required to move such heavy and awkward loads forward. ADSEC intended to provide double-track railway lines to support the armies: a line from Aachen, Germany, to Wesel, Germany, for the Ninth Army; one from Aachen to Cologne for the First Army; and one from Thionville, France, to Koblenz, Germany, for the Third Army.

To conserve stocks of M2 treadway bridging, the Ninth Army engineers planned to use the narrower M1 treadway bridging for one of the Rhine bridges. A problem with this was that its Sherman tanks were fitted with track extenders that helped them move over snow and mud. To accommodate this, two M1 treadway bridges were modified by increasing the space between the treadways.

The German offensives in the Ardennes and Alsace had convinced Eisenhower that the entire west bank of the Rhine had to be cleared before attempting a crossing. The river would then provide the Allies as well as the Germans with a defensive barrier that could be held with a minimum of forces. There was no intention of seizing an intact bridge; on the contrary, he had asked the air forces if they could destroy all the bridges. The answer was negative: there were twenty-six major bridges over the Rhine, and at least twenty would have to be destroyed to have any effect on operations. Given the poor autumn and winter flying weather and the large number of anti-aircraft guns defending the bridges, the air staff calculated that it would require too much time and bomb tonnage, and divert too many aircraft from the oil campaign. In any case, it was anticipated that the retreating Germans would blow all the bridges.

== Rhineland ==
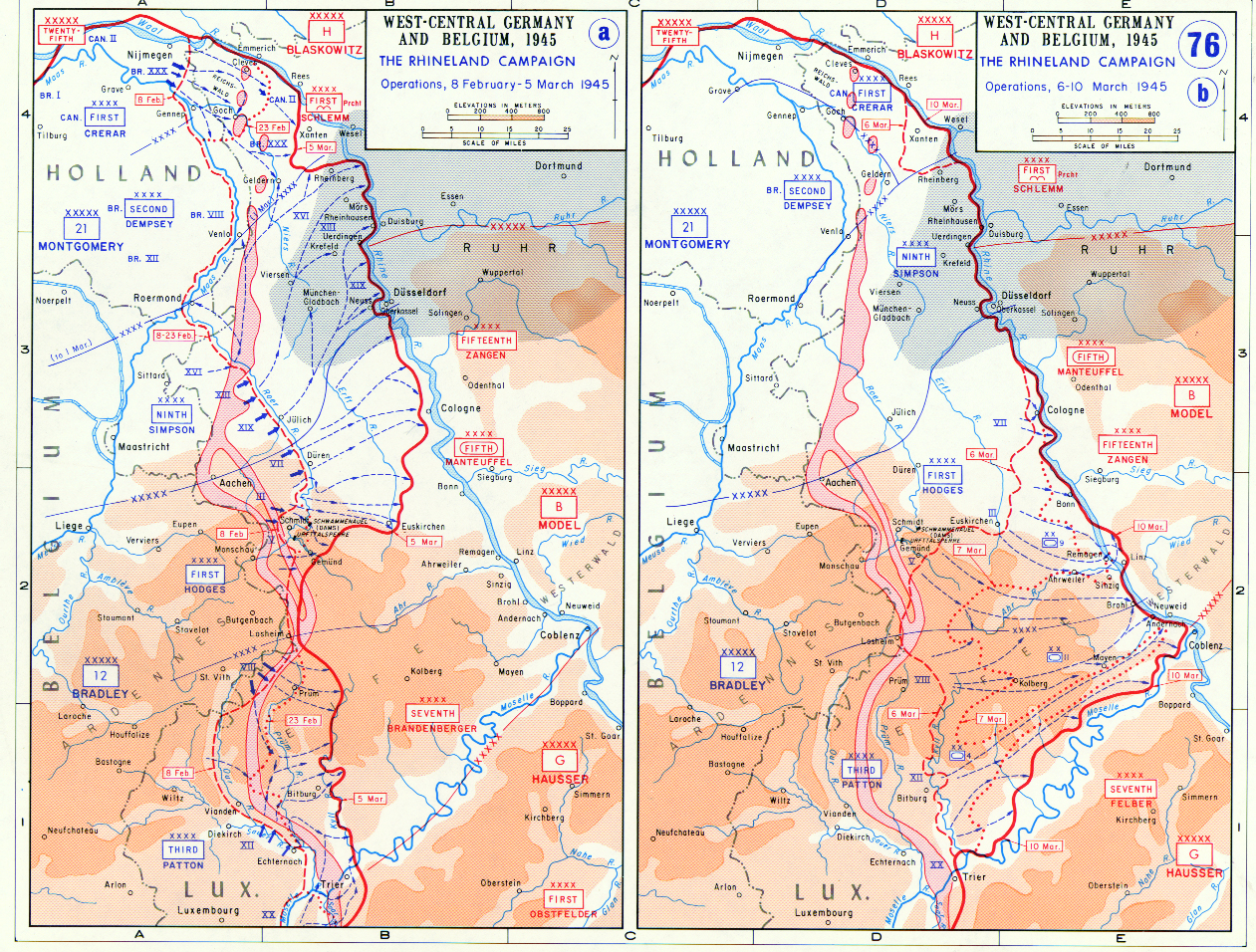
Rhineland Campaign – 8 February to 10 March 1945

With the German offensives in the Ardennes and Alsace defeated, priority for ammunition, which was rationed due to recurrent shortages, switched to the Ninth Army, which was to make the main Rhine crossing effort. In February, 45 percent of the artillery ammunition received was delivered to the Ninth Army, compared to 30 percent to the First Army and 25 percent to the Third Army. As it happened though, the Third Army was engaged in the most activity of the three in the first weeks of the month. By mid-February it had 5.4 days' supply of 155 mm gun M1 ammunition on hand compared to 23.3 days for the Ninth Army and 25.9 days for the First. It was a similar story with 81 mm M1 mortar ammunition, with Third Army having 2.4 days on hand while the Ninth and First Armies had 12.7 and 16 days respectively. The 12th Army Group headquarters had to adjust the quotas.

Before it could reach the Rhine, the Ninth Army had first to cross the Roer. The Ninth Army's troop movements for the Roer crossing, codenamed Operation Grenade, coincided with a thaw and frequent rains. Roads quickly deteriorated under the military traffic. Some roads were made one-way to protect their soft shoulders; in other instances, it was simply accepted that the traffic would destroy the road. To keep the traffic flowing, engineer units patched the roads and ordnance units recovered vehicles that had broken down. A particular concern was the bridge over the Maas at Maastricht, which was threatened by flood waters, and had to be closed to traffic and weighed down by sand bags. A bridge under construction at Maaseik, Belgium, was damaged by floating debris and two cranes being used as pile drivers were lost when the barges they were on sank.

Up river on the Roer were two major dams that were still in German hands: the Urft Dam (Urfttalsperre), which was filled to capacity with 45,500,000 cubic meters, and the Rur Dam (Schwammenauel), which was two-thirds full with 65,500,000 cubic meters. Their demolition could create a catastrophic flood of the Roer valley for five or six days. Alternatively, the Germans could destroy the outlets, which would create a more controlled flood. The First Army's 78th Infantry Division captured the Urft on 4 February and the Rur after hard fighting five days later. The retreating Germans demolished the discharge valves, creating a controlled flood. Within hours the waters rose by 5 feet (1.5 m) and their velocity increased to 10 1/2 feet per second (3.2 m/s). On the advice of his engineers, Simpson postponed Operation Grenade to 23 February, the day before the river was expected to return to normal.

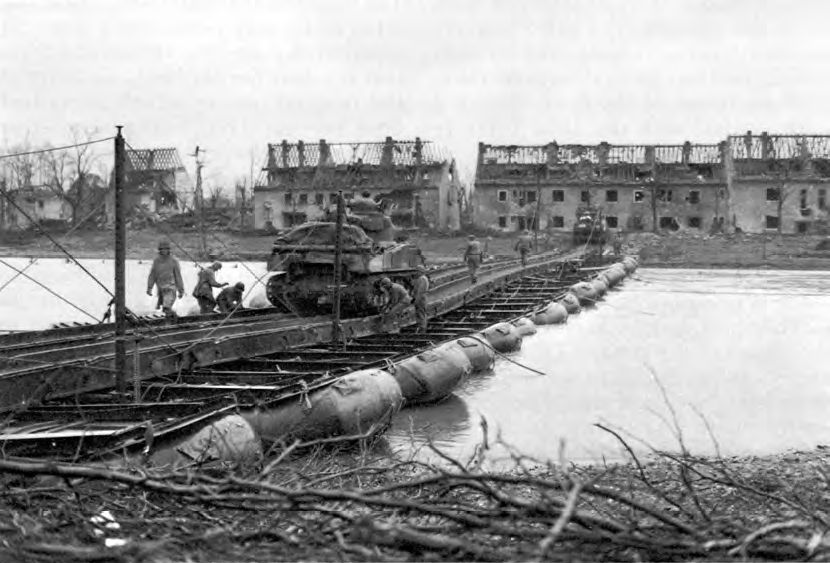
Tanks of the 2nd Armored Division cross the Roer into Juelich on a ponton bridge.

This provided an opportunity to move more supplies forward. In the week ending 10 February, 32,924 long tons (33,452 t) were delivered by rail, and another 44,555 long tons (45,270 t) the following week. To move these supplies to the dumps, the Ninth Army's twenty-seven truck companies were augmented with ten from the 12th Army Group and three borrowed from the First Army. About 30 percent of the automotive spare parts required for Operation Grenade were obtained from recovered salvage, allowing more signals and engineering stores to be brought forward. In preparation for the advance to the Rhine, one of the Ninth Army's light tank battalions and the reconnaissance units of its armored and infantry divisions were reequipped with the new M24 Chaffee light tank, and nine tank destroyer battalions were reequipped, six of them with the M36 tank destroyer.

The Ninth Army amassed twenty days' supply of ammunition (about 46,000 long tons (47,000 t) and ten days' supply of fuel (about 3,000,000 US gallons (11,000,000 L)). In case there was some hold up with the bridges, 500 Douglas C-47 Skytrain transport aircraft loaded with supplies were on standby. Between 10 December 1944 and 11 March 1945, when Operation Grenade was completed, the Ninth Army consumed 26,494,933 rations, 20,806,185 US gallons (78,759,980 L) of gasoline and 833,505 US gallons (3,155,160 L) of diesel oil. Most of the fuel was supplied over a pipeline from Antwerp to the ADSEC tank farms around Maastricht, which could deliver 1,035,920 US gallons (3,921,400 L) per day. During the February thaw the decanting station at Maastricht, where fuel was transferred into jerry cans, could not handle the traffic, so a forward decanting station was established at Lutterade in the Netherlands, which was supplied by tank cars from Maastricht.

Operation Grenade was finally launched on 23 February. By the end of the first day, seven Class 40 and twelve smaller bridges were open or nearing completion. (Note: A class 40 bridge is the Military Load Classification for a bridge roughly capable of bearing a load of 40 short tons (36 t). Similarly, a class 70 bridge can carry a load of up to 70 short tons (64 t).) A class 70 bridge was built near Körrenzig that was opened on 26 February. The railway bridges over the Roer in Germany at Baal and Dueren were rebuilt by ADSEC Engineer Groups A and C and opened for traffic on 11 March. The 1056th Port Construction and Repair Group extended the railway from Baal toward Geldern and Wesel and Engineer Group C extended the line from Aachen towards Cologne.

== Rhine crossing ==
=== First Army ===
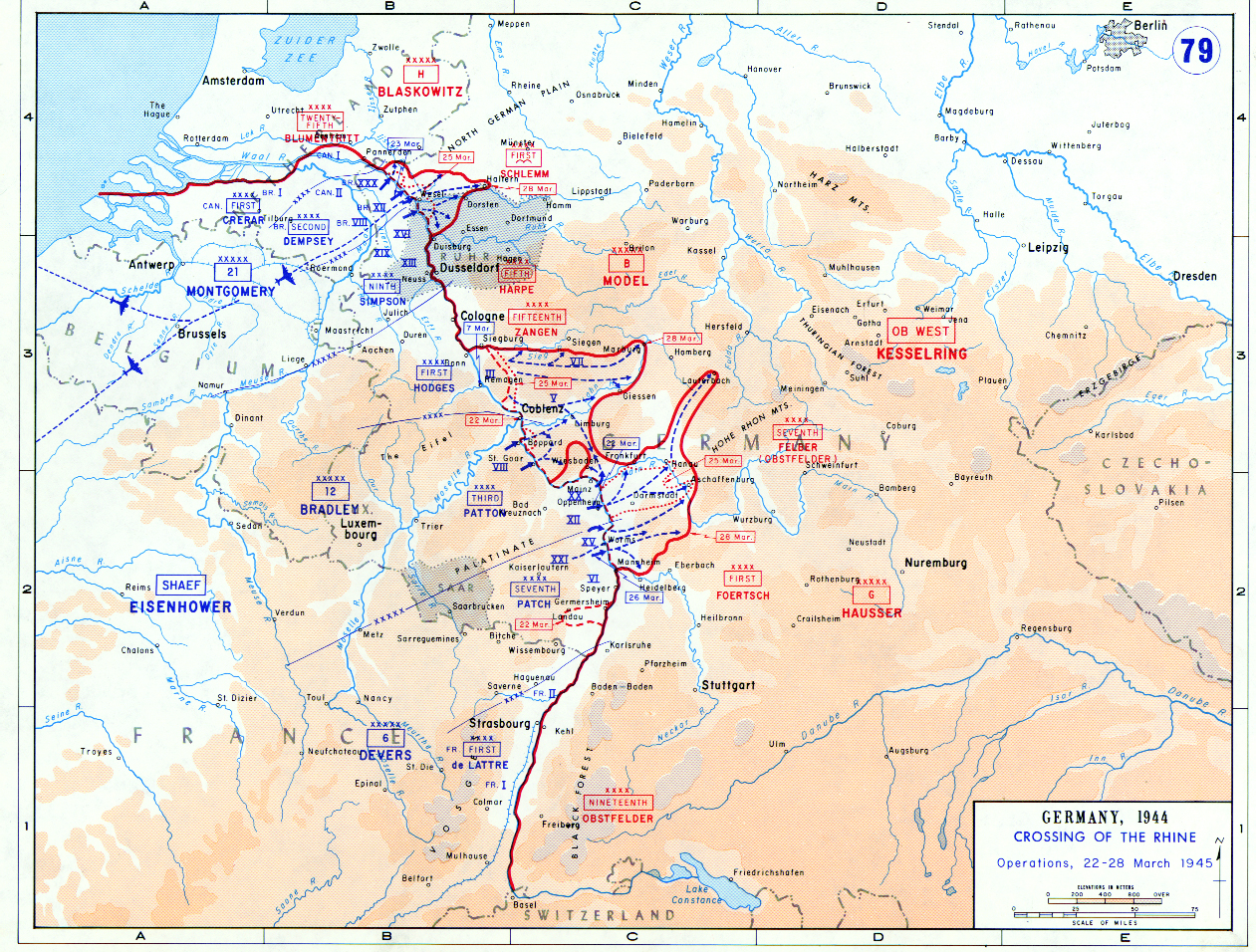
Crossing the Rhine, 22–28 March 1945

Nonetheless, efforts were made to seize an intact bridge. On 2 March 1945, a task force from the Ninth Army's 83rd Infantry Division attempted to seize the bridge at Oberkassel, Germany, by using German-speaking Americans and tanks disguised as German ones. They reached the bridge, but not in time to prevent it being blown up. By 5 March, all eight of the bridges in the Ninth Army's area had been demolished. Two days later, the Ludendorff Bridge at Remagen, Germany, was captured intact, albeit badly damaged, by a task force from the First Army's 9th Armored Division after the German demolition charges failed to destroy it. Eisenhower and Bradley took time to decide what to do about the unexpected opportunity. On 9 March, Bradley told Hodges to hold a bridgehead but limit it to what five divisions could defend.

A treadway bridge company had formed part of the 9th Armored Division task force, and First Army headquarters dispatched two combat engineer battalions, two treadway bridge companies, and two heavy ponton battalions to Remagen. The engineers soon had ferries in operation, and DUKWs were also employed. Nearly 8,000 men crossed the Rhine in the first 24 hours after the bridge's capture. The first ten LCVPs of Boat Unit 1 were launched on the Rhine on 11 March and established a ferry service. The LCMs were not deployed, as the First Army staff considered that the bridge made them unnecessary. The LCVPs could make the round trip in seven minutes, carrying infantrymen across the river faster than they could walk across the bridge. On 17 March, six LCVPs carried 2,200 infantrymen of the 1st Infantry Division in three hours. By 27 March they had ferried 14,000 troops and 400 vehicles across.

The Luftwaffe attempted to destroy the bridge but ran into a cordon of anti-aircraft fire. To defend the bridge, the First Army deployed thirteen anti-aircraft battalions, which claimed 109 aircraft destroyed. The Germans attempted to destroy it with artillery, including a 540 mm Karl-Gerät siege mortar. Eleven V-2 rockets were fired at it and frogmen attempted to attack it. A 1,032-foot (315 m) treadway bridge was in operation on 10 March, and it allowed 3,105 troops to cross in its first two days of operation. Construction of a heavy ponton bridge began at 16:00 on 10 March but the swift current gave so much trouble for the engineers' power boats that they called on the LCVPs for help to move the pontons into place. The bridge was opened at 23:00 on 11 March and carried eastbound traffic while the treadway bridge handled westbound traffic.

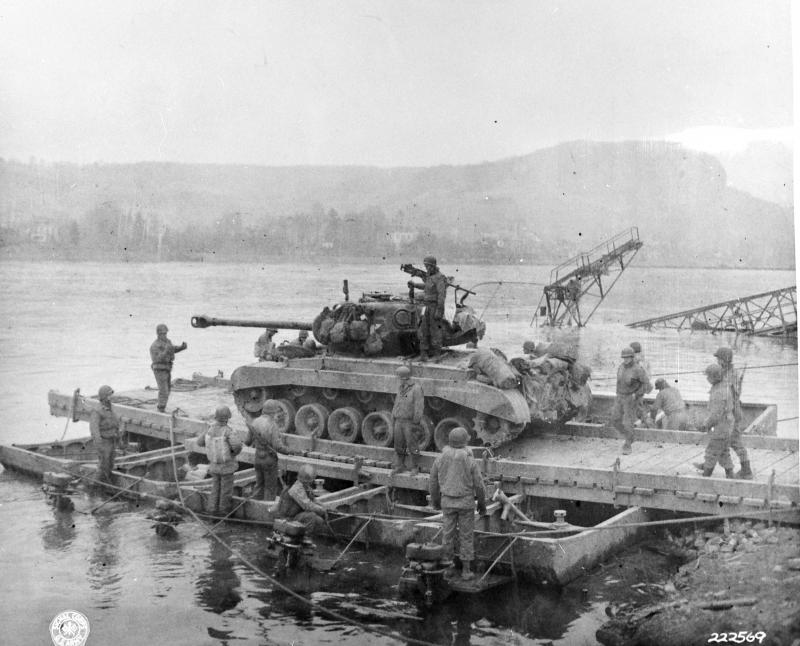
An M26 Pershing tank is transported across the Rhine on a ponton ferry on 12 March 1945. Because of their width, Pershings were normally ferried across instead of using the bridges.

With these bridges in operation, the Ludendorff bridge was closed for repairs on 12 March. At 15:00 on 17 March it suddenly collapsed, weakened by the initial demolition attempt and vibrations from German and American artillery fire. Twenty-eight men were killed, ten of whose bodies were never recovered. At 07:30 the following day, work commenced on a 1,258-foot (383 m) floating Bailey bridge that was opened at 07:15 on 20 March. A two-way Bailey bridge was built at Bad Godesberg, Germany, and opened on 5 April.

With the capture of the Ludendorff bridge, ADSEC began reconstructing the railway line from Dueren to Remagen. The collapse of the bridge ended the possibility of using it for railway traffic, so the line was extended southward to Koblenz along the west bank of the Rhine. SHAEF considered exploiting the Remagen bridgehead for an advance on the Ruhr to be logistically inadvisable in view of the terrain. Instead, it called for an advance to the south, where the bridgehead could link up with the railway and pipeline from Verdun in the Mainz-Mannheim area.

=== Ninth Army ===
The Ninth Army's 30th and 79th Infantry Divisions began crossing the Rhine south of Wesel at 02:00 on 24 March, aided by a massive artillery barrage. The two assault divisions were soon across, followed by LVTs and DUKWs carrying supplies and ammunition. Next came the 24 LCVPs and 20 LCMs of Boat Unit 3. On the first day it ferried 3,000 troops, 374 tanks and tank destroyers, 15 bulldozers, 180 M29 Weasels and 300 jeeps across, and brought back 200 wounded and 500 prisoners. To guide the watercraft in the dark, machine gun tracer ammunition was used to mark the boundaries of the assault areas for the first wave. Ten-foot (3.0 m) stakes with flashlights on them were then erected to mark the landing sites: two lights for the LCVPs, three for the LCMs, and four for DD tanks.

The DD tanks were acquired from the British, and operated by a company of the 736th Tank Battalion. The LVTs were operated by the 747th Tank Battalion. Although some ferries were built, they saw little use, as the light German resistance permitted the construction of tactical floating bridges sooner than anticipated. Construction of the first bridge, a 1,530-foot (470 m) treadway at Wallach, commenced at 06:30 on 24 March and the bridge was completed in nine hours. Over the following week, three more treadways, three heavy ponton bridges and three floating Bailey bridges were completed.

Although the Rhine had now been crossed at several points, Wesel was the only one of the previously selected crossing points securely in Allied hands on 26 March, so the engineers decided to start there. The planners had intended to use the site of the existing bridge downstream from where the Lippe entered the Rhine, but the ADSEC engineers found that damage on the far side was so extensive that rehabilitation work would take too long. They therefore settled on an upstream site near a demolished road bridge over which the Germans had laid a single-track railway line. This meant that in addition to twenty-three spans totaling 1,753 feet (534 m), the Lippe also had to be bridged, which involved another six spans totaling 463 feet (141 m).

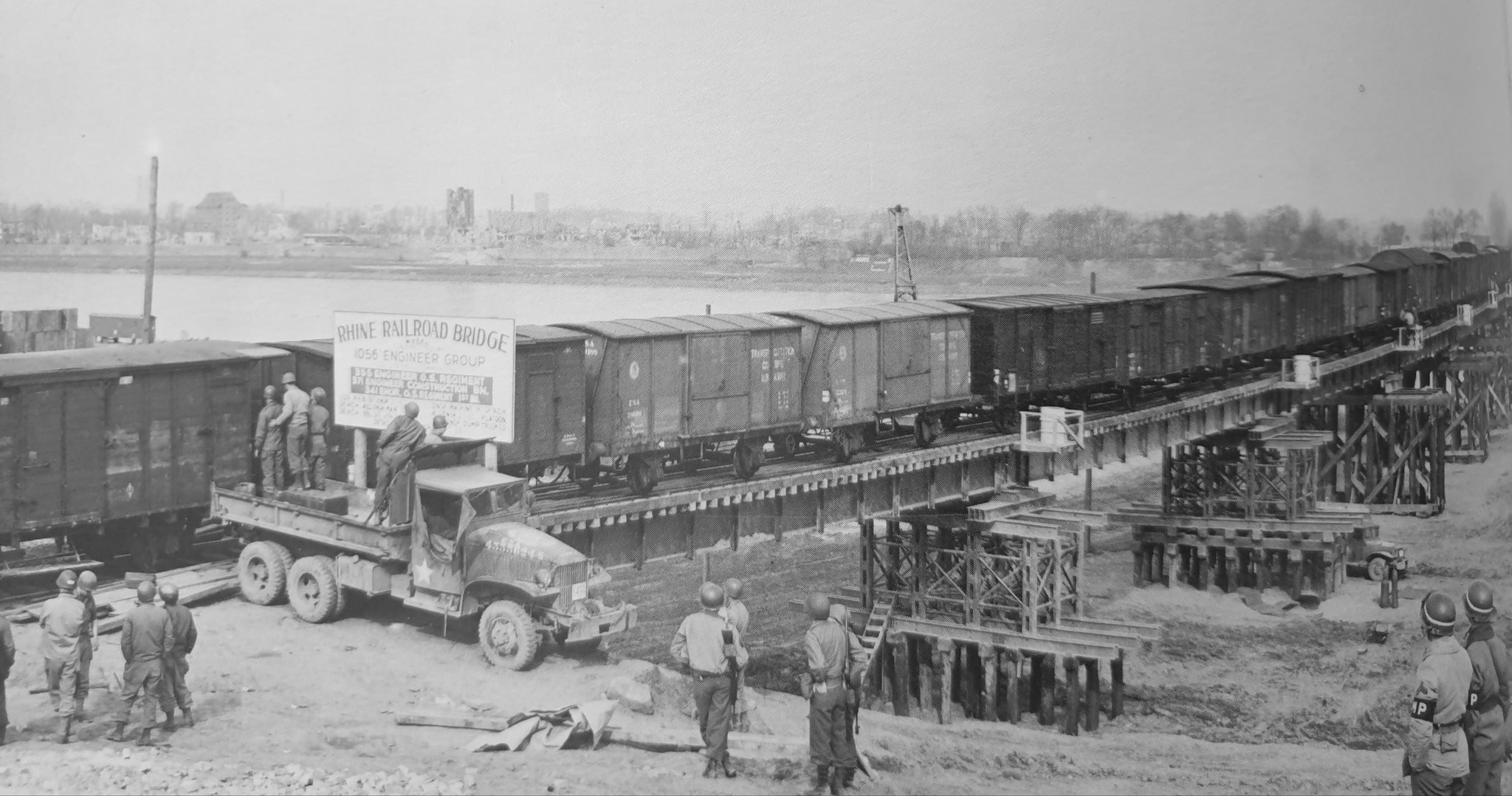
Robert A. Gouldin railroad bridge over the Rhine at Wesel

Work was undertaken by the 1056th Engineer Port Construction and Repair Group, which controlled elements of the 341st, 355th, and 1317th Engineer General Service Regiments and smaller units, including a detachment of the US Navy Seabees of the 629th Construction Battalion Maintenance Unit, and commenced on 29 March. Working around the clock, they managed to complete the bridge in ten days, an accomplishment comparable to Caesar's Rhine bridges two thousand years before. The bridge was opened to traffic at 01:00 on 9 April, and was named after Major Robert A. Gouldin, one of three men of the 355th Engineer General Service Regiment who were drowned during construction when their DUKW overturned. Although the bridge was single track, it had double-track approaches on both sides. Two miles (3.2 km) of connecting track were laid and the rail yards at Wesel and Büderich, Germany, were rehabilitated. The first train rolled over the bridge 25 minutes after it was opened.

The Ninth Army's 1146th Engineer Combat Group, with the 250th, 252nd, and 1256th Engineer Combat Battalions and detachments of ADSEC's 1053rd and 1058th Port Construction and Repair Groups and the 629th Construction Battalion Maintenance Unit, undertook the construction nearby of a three-lane highway bridge with two class 40 lanes and a class 70 lane. A preliminary bridge design had been drawn up in November 1944. As with the railway bridge, both the Rhine and the Lippe had to be bridged, the former with 1,036 feet (316 m) and the latter with 120 feet (37 m) of bridge. Some 19,500 cubic yards (14,900 m^{3}) of fill was required for the western approach roads, and Fort Blücher was demolished to provide rubble for the embankment. The bridge was opened to traffic at 14:30 on 18 April and named the Roosevelt bridge in honor of President Franklin D. Roosevelt, who had died the week before.

=== Third Army ===
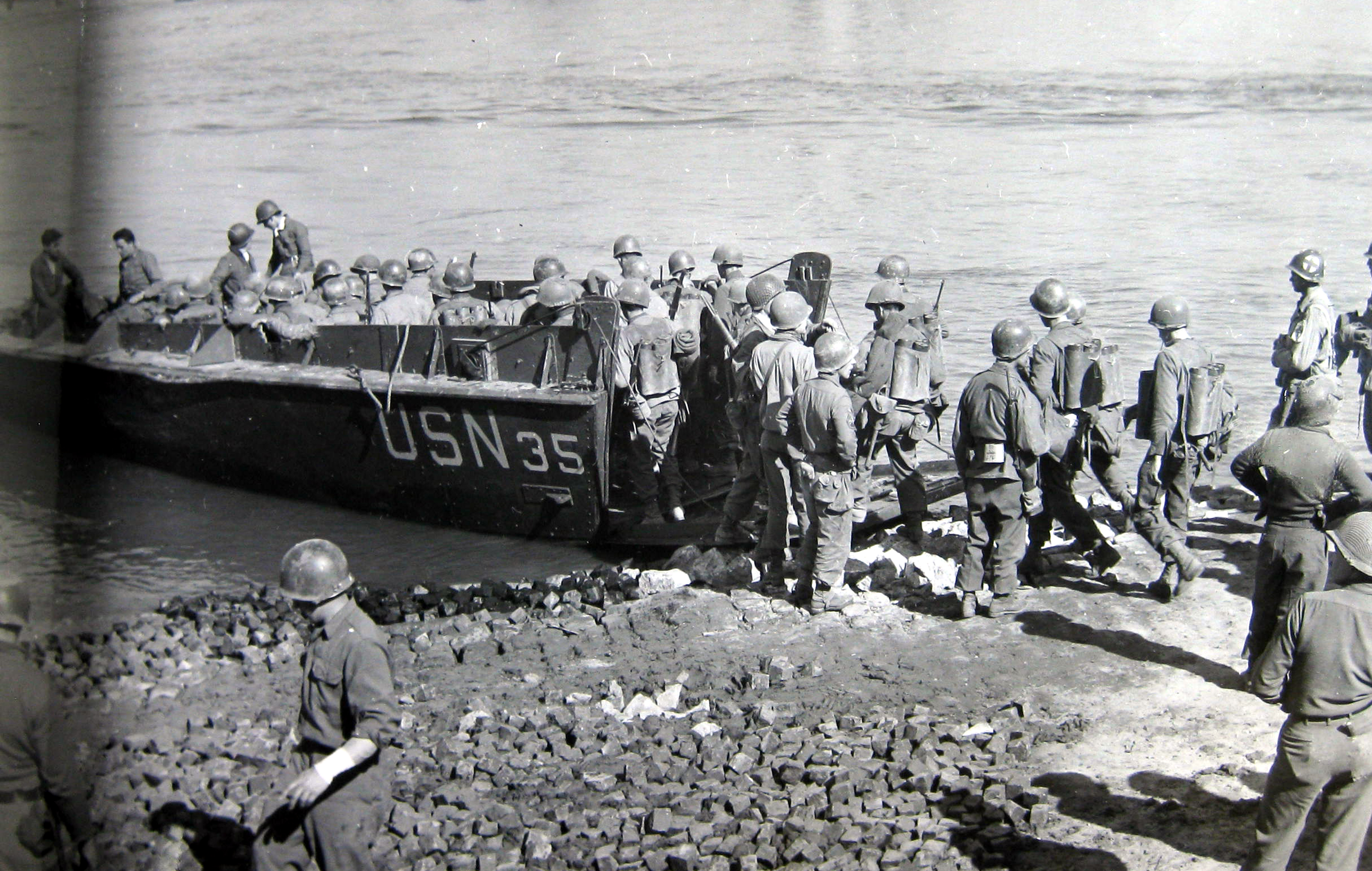
Infantrymen of the 5th Division, Third Army, board a LCVP to cross the Rhine at Nierstein.

In the south the Third Army was supplied by road and rail from the ADSEC depots around Verdun and Reims. On 18 March a rail link was opened to Ehrang station in Trier, France. ADSEC trucks hauled supplies between there and the Third Army depots. The sudden collapse of opposition to the Third and Seventh Armies east of the Moselle allowed the railways to be extended to the Rhine, although not in time for the assault crossings. It was discovered that the line from Thionville to Mainz, Germany, could be restored more easily than the one from Thionville to Koblenz, so work was shifted there. ADSEC Engineer Group B had a single-track line to Mainz completed by 1 April. The railhead supporting the Third Army moved to Heidesheim and Ingelheim near Mainz on 4 April.

The Third Army had begun planning for the Rhine crossing in August 1944, and commenced stocking equipment for it the following month. When the boundaries between the Third and Seventh Armies were adjusted during the German Ardennes offensive to allow the Third Army to pivot north, Patton had insisted on them being drawn so as to retain the dumps with the accumulated equipment in the Third Army's zone. The stocks were depleted by assault crossings of the Saar in February and the Moselle in March, but the dumps still held 1,500 assault boats, 300 smaller storm boats, 660 22-horsepower (16 kW) and 250 55-horsepower (41 kW) outboard motors, 7,000 feet (2,100 m) of floating Bailey bridge, 2,200 feet (670 m) of heavy ponton bridge, and 11,000 feet (3,400 m) of treadway bridge. When the Rhine was finally reached the dumps were up to 150 miles (240 km) from the crossing sites. The equipment was brought forward by trucks, carefully prioritized so as to deliver it in the required order.

At 22:00 on 22 March, the Third Army's 5th Infantry Division commenced an assault crossing of the Rhine at Nierstein and Oppenheim, Germany. The site had been selected long before because it straddled one of the main roads to Frankfurt am Main, and the Rhine was only 1,000 feet (300 m) wide at this point, with a slow current of 3 to 4 feet per second (0.91 to 1.22 m/s), and sandy banks firm enough to support amphibious vehicles. For political reasons, Marshall, Eisenhower, Bradley and Patton wanted an American assault crossing ahead of the British one the following day. It was represented as an improvised crossing in contrast to that of the 21st Army Group, but the only improvisation resulted from the crossing date being brought forward.

This had consequences; a German self-propelled 105 mm howitzer disrupted the efforts of the 88th Engineer Heavy Ponton Battalion to assemble rafts. It was not until 08:30 on 23 March that they were available and tank destroyers could cross and silence the German gun. The 24 LCVPs of Boat Unit 2 were on the water by 06:30 on 23 March, but the DUKWs and Weasels did not arrive until the following day. Work on a class 40 treadway bridge commenced at daybreak and it was opened at 18:00 on 23 March. A 1,280-foot (390 m) class 40 heavy ponton bridge was in operation by noon the following day, and a second treadway was completed on 25 March.

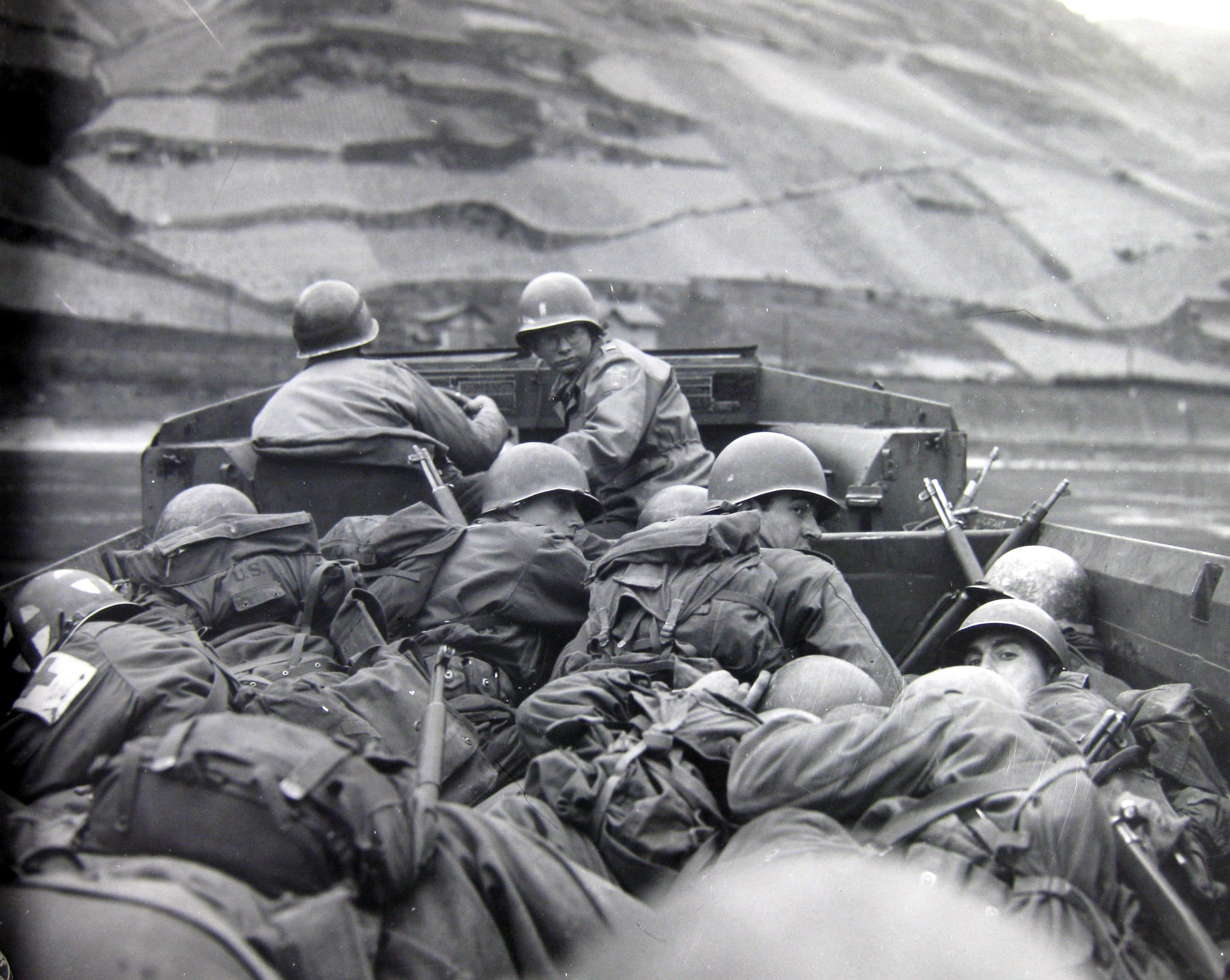
Men of the 89th Infantry Division cross the Rhine at Oberwesel in a DUKW on 28 March 1945.

Patton's chief artillery officer, Brigadier General Edward T. "Molly" Williams, had proposed using artillery observation aircraft to move troops across the Rhine. A trial was undertaken, which demonstrated that a hundred light aircraft could transport a battalion in two hours, but the appearance of the Luftwaffe over the crossing site caused the idea to be abandoned.

The 87th Infantry Division attempted to cross the Rhine Gorge at Rhens and Boppard, Germany, on 25 March. This was one of the most difficult and treacherous sections of the river. It was flanked by steep cliffs with winding approach roads. Patton selected the site in the belief that such a poor site would be lightly defended. This proved to be incorrect. The German defense at Rhens was so fierce that the crossing there was abandoned and units were switched to Boppard, where the erection of a 1,044-foot (318 m) M2 treadway bridge began at 08:00 on 25 March and was completed by 09:30 the next day. The outboard motors on the power boats had difficult moving M2 treadway rafts in the swift current, so LCVPs were used. It was estimated that they ferried about 5,000 men and 400 vehicles across.

The 89th Infantry Division attempted a crossing of the Rhine Gorge at St. Goar and Oberwesel, Germany, on 26 March. The defenders at St. Goar were alert and well-equipped with automatic weapons. The main crossing effort was switched to Oberwessel where resistance was also staunch. Work on a treadway bridge began at St. Goar at 18:00 on 27 March, but took 36 hours to complete owing to the swift 6 to 8 feet per second (1.8 to 2.4 m/s) current and a rocky bottom that made anchorage difficult. In the meantime, units of the 89th Infantry Division crossed using the 87th Infantry Division's bridge at Boppard.

Patton could have used the bridges that had been established at Oppenheim and Boppard, but they were poorly situated from a logistical point of view, with limited road and rail access. He therefore chose to undertake a third river crossing operation at Mainz, which was more centrally located and possessed good road and rail networks, making it the preferred site for highway and railway bridges. The 80th Infantry Division began crossing there at 01:00 on 28 March. The 160th Engineer Combat Battalion constructed a 1,896-foot (578 m) M2 treadway bridge at the site, believed to be the longest of its type ever built under combat conditions. ADSEC's Engineer Group B undertook the task of building a new railway bridge at Mainz. It was 2,215 feet (675 m) long and took nine and a half days to build. Patton opened it on 14 April, and it was a second bridge named after President Roosevelt, who had died two days before.

=== Seventh Army ===
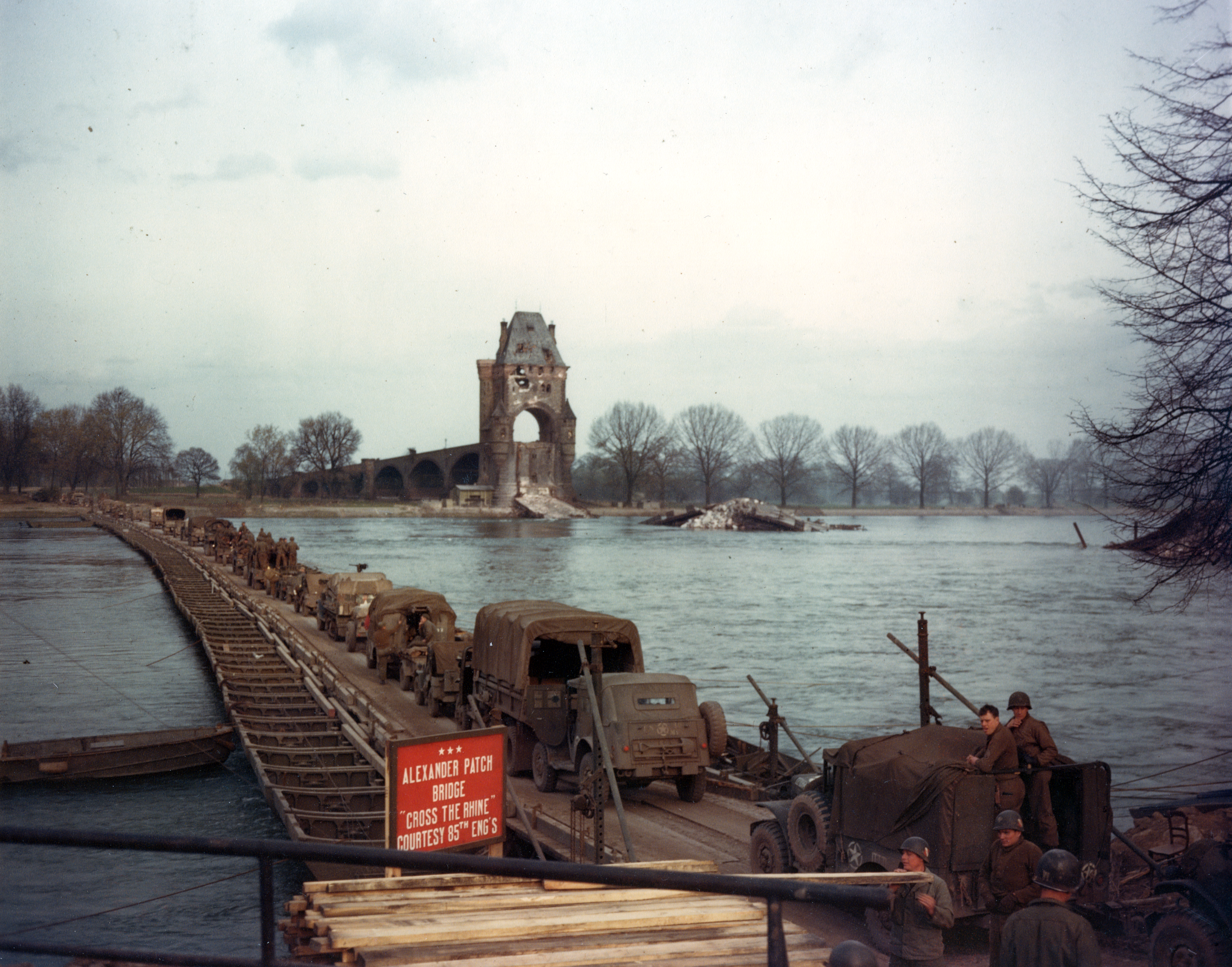
American forces cross the Alexander Patch bridge.

The Seventh Army crossed the Rhine upstream from Worms, Germany, at 02:30 on 26 March. The 163rd Engineer Combat Battalion built a treadway bridge but it was not open until 18:50. In the meantime, the 85th Engineer Heavy Ponton Battalion built a 1,047-foot (319 m) heavy ponton bridge, making the treadway bridge unnecessary. The ponton bridge was named the Alexander Patch Bridge after the Seventh Army's commander. Some 3,040 vehicles crossed the bridge during its first day of operation. The 1553rd Heavy Ponton Battalion built another bridge downstream at Rheinduerkheim, Germany, but the Alexander Patch Bridge was open earlier and had a superior location, so that bridge saw little use. The 85th and 1553rd Heavy Ponton Battalions teamed up to build a new class 70 heavy ponton bridge at Ludwigshafen, Germany, on 30 March. Work commenced at daybreak and the bridge was open to heavy vehicles at 19:00, and named the Gar Davidson Bridge after the Seventh Army's chief engineer, Brigadier General Garrison H. Davidson.

The 1st Military Railway Service built two railway bridges over the Rhine in the Seventh Army zone. Work commenced on the first, a 937-foot (286 m) bridge at Mannheim, on 12 April, and it was completed on 23 April. The second was a 851-foot (259 m) bridge at Karlsruhe, Germany, where work commenced on 17 April and was completed on 29 April. With the bridge at Wesel in the Ninth Army zone and the one at Mainz in the Third Army's, that made four railway bridges over the Rhine. A fifth railway bridge over the Rhine was built at Duisburg, Germany, by ADSEC Group A, which commenced work on 2 May. The thirty-eight-span, 2,815-foot (858 m) bridge was completed in a record time of six and a half days but too late to have any impact on the campaign.

== Central Europe campaign ==
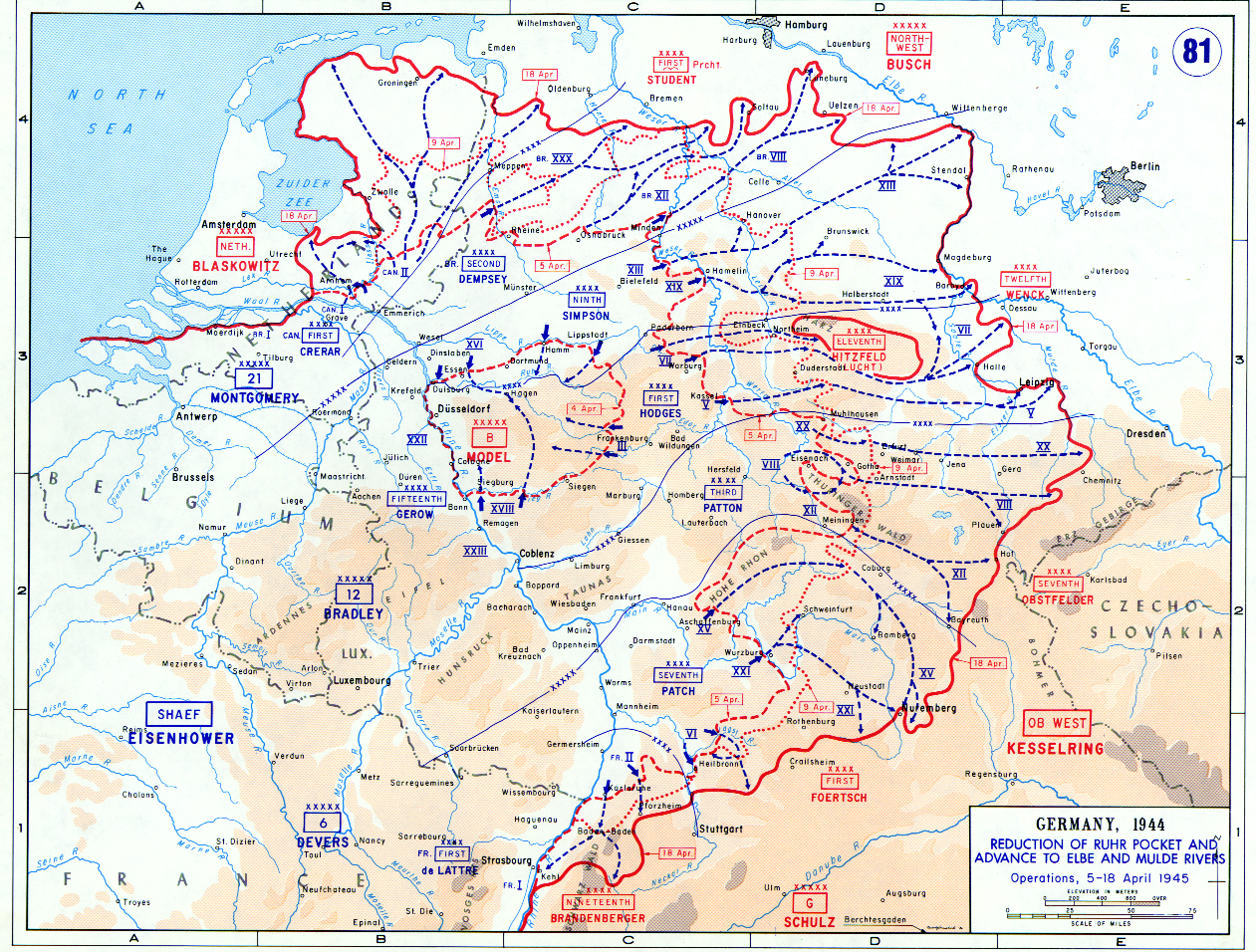
Advance through Germany, 5–18 April 1945

After the Rhine had been crossed, the American armies advanced rapidly across Germany. The major effort was the encirclement of the Ruhr, which was accomplished when the First and Ninth Armies linked up at Lippstadt on 1 April 1945. The armies then moved east and south on a broad front. German resistance crumbled rapidly in most areas, but remained fierce and stubborn in others, especially the Thuringian Forest and the Harz Mountains. By 18 April, when the Ruhr pocket was eliminated, the armies had reached the Elbe and Mulde rivers. The Third and Seventh Armies then drove south into southern Germany, Austria, Czechoslovakia and Italy, while the First Army made contact with the Red Army at Torgau on 25 April.

=== Organization changes ===
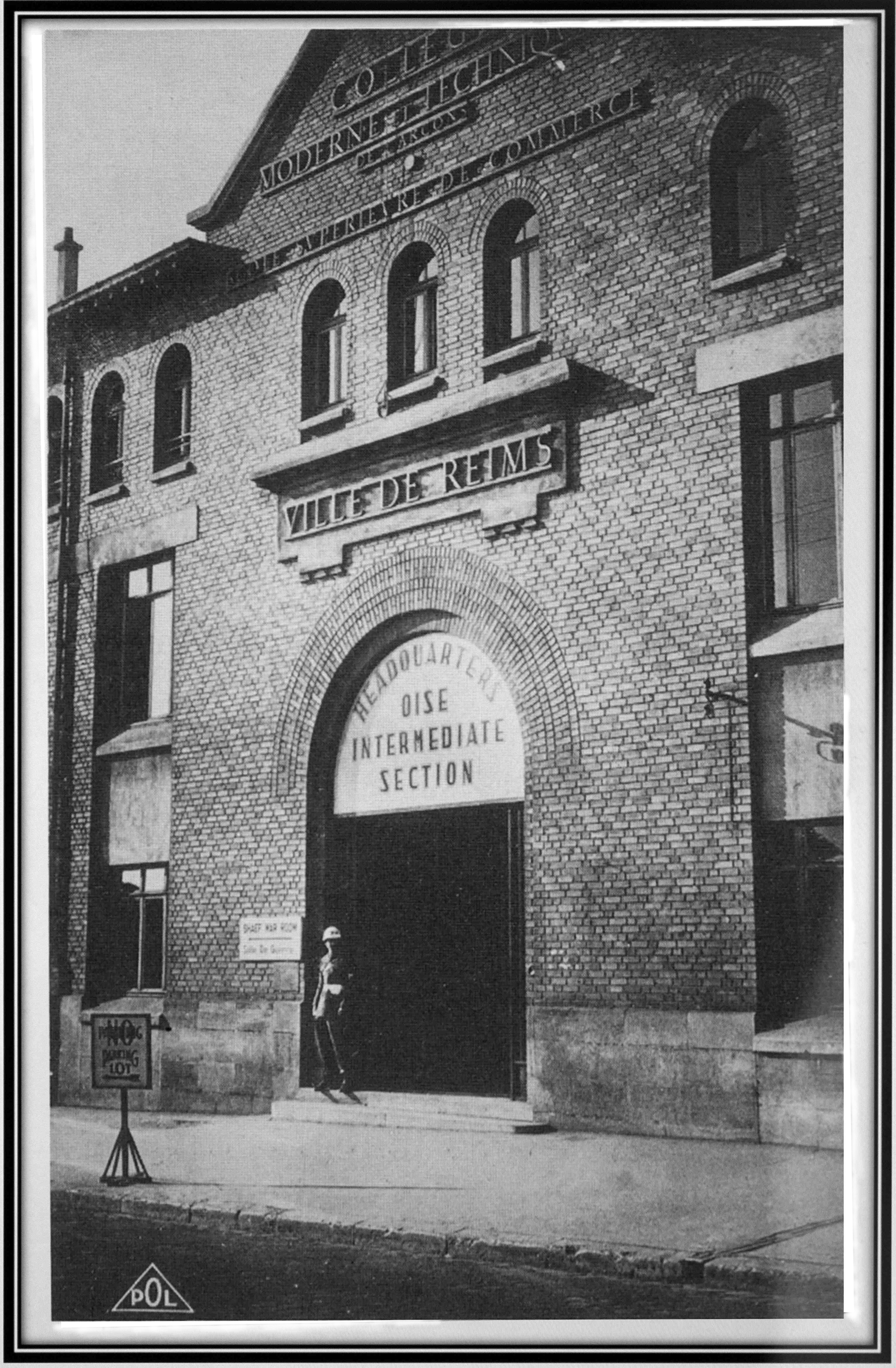
Headquarters Oise Intermediate Section, Rheims.

For the final advance into Germany, it was planned that ADSEC and CONAD would follow the 12th and 6th Army Groups respectively, but have no area responsibilities in Germany. The Burgundy District was therefore transferred from CONAD to the Oise Section on 21 March, and on 2 April the Oise Section became the Oise Intermediate Section, with three territorial districts: Burgundy, Luxembourg and Marne. On 1 April ADSEC relinquished all its territorial responsibilities to the Channel Base Section and the Oise Intermediate Section, and CONAD turned its remaining territory over to the Oise Intermediate Section the following week. ADSEC moved its headquarters to Germany, first to Bonn, and then to Fulda, while CONAD established its at Kaiserslautern, Germany.

=== Railways ===
The logistics plans did not anticipate that railway traffic beyond the Rhine would be substantial before the middle of April at the earliest. Nonetheless, the ADSEC and Army engineers immediately set about rehabilitating the railway network. Some use was made of the railways even before the bridges were opened, hauling supplies brought across the river by truck. In the north the line from Münster to Paderborn to Kassel in Germany was already in use when the bridge at Wesel was opened on 9 April, allowing the Ninth Army to be supported by rail.

Within ten days of the opening of the bridge at Wesel, 20,000 long tons (20,000 t) of supplies were being carried across the bridges each day. The capacity of the Mainz and Wesel bridges combined had been estimated at 20,000 long tons (20,000 t) per day but up to 13,590 long tons (13,810 t) was moved over the Mainz bridge and 16,720 long tons (16,990 t) over the Wesel bridge in one day. The bridges carried an average of 8,000 long tons (8,100 t) each. Between 2 and 4 May, the railways carried 28,000 long tons (28,000 t) (80 percent) of the 35,000 long tons (36,000 t) of equipment and supplies moved across the Rhine.

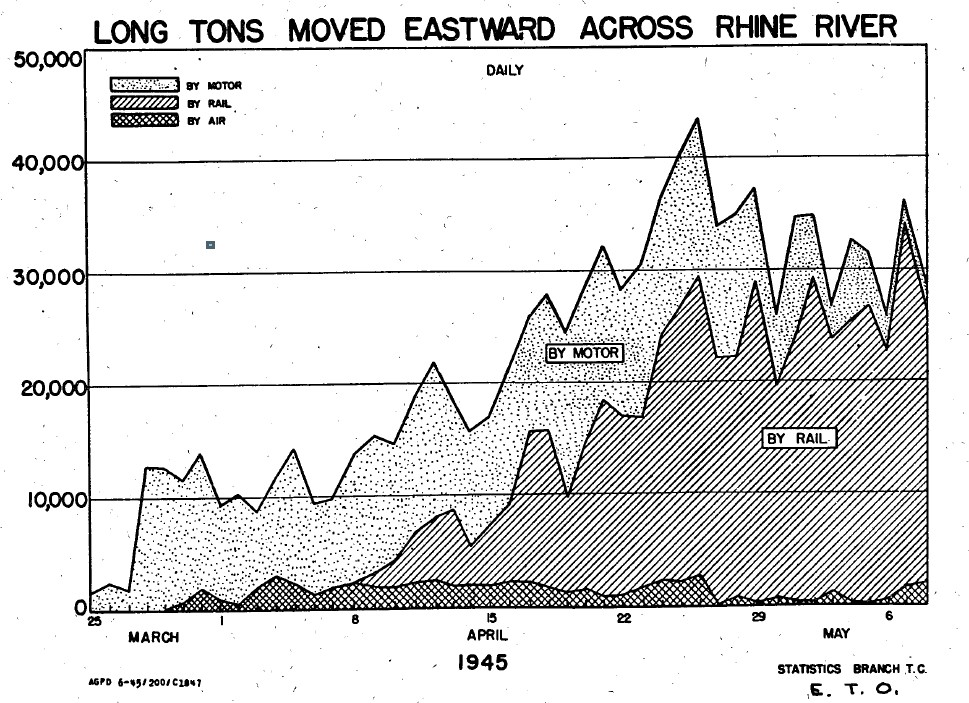
Long tons moved eastward across the Rhine, March to May 1945.

The bridge at Wesel became a major bottleneck after the collapse of the Ludendorff bridge because it had to handle traffic for both the First and Ninth Armies, raising issues of coordination and traffic control. The 21st Army Group also asked for an allocation of bridge traffic. This was denied by COMZ but then authorized by SHAEF on appeal. The British were allowed one train carrying 500 tonnes (490 long tons; 550 short tons) each day. This was soon increased. It was because of the Wesel bridge's difficulty meeting both British and American requirements that the additional bridge at Duisburg was authorized.

A shortage of railway cars developed at the Mainz crossing, where at one point there was an excess of 12,200 loaded cars over unloaded ones. To alleviate this, returning cars loaded with captured German materiel were unloaded. No provision had been made for storing it in the vicinity of the river, so improvised dumps were formed by quartermaster detachments, assisted by POWs and civilians. Part of the problem was that the Third Army's representatives attempted to expedite the delivery of the most urgently required supplies. This resulted in sidetracking loaded cars containing less urgent cargo. There was also a tendency to hold reserves on wheels in forward areas despite threats and warnings from ETOUSA and SHAEF.

Over the following weeks the rehabilitation of the railway network kept pace with the advance. No less than twenty-six engineer general service regiments were working on the railways. The railway service supporting the Third Army reached Würzburg, Germany, on 24 April and Nurnberg, Germany, on 5 May. By 8 May railheads had been established at Stendal and Magdeburg, Germany, for the Ninth Army, Leipzig, Germany, for the First Army, Regensburg, Germany, for the Third Army, and Stuttgart, Germany, for the Seventh Army. By July 1945, 1,987 locomotives and 43,972 railway cars, of which 21,512 were 20-ton box cars and 10,983 were 20-ton gondola cars, had been delivered to the Military Railway Service. The 1st and 2nd Military Railway Services were organized into seven grand divisions, with twenty-four railway operating battalions and seven shop battalions, and operated 11,000 miles (18,000 km) of track.

=== Motor transport ===
==== Motor Transport Service ====
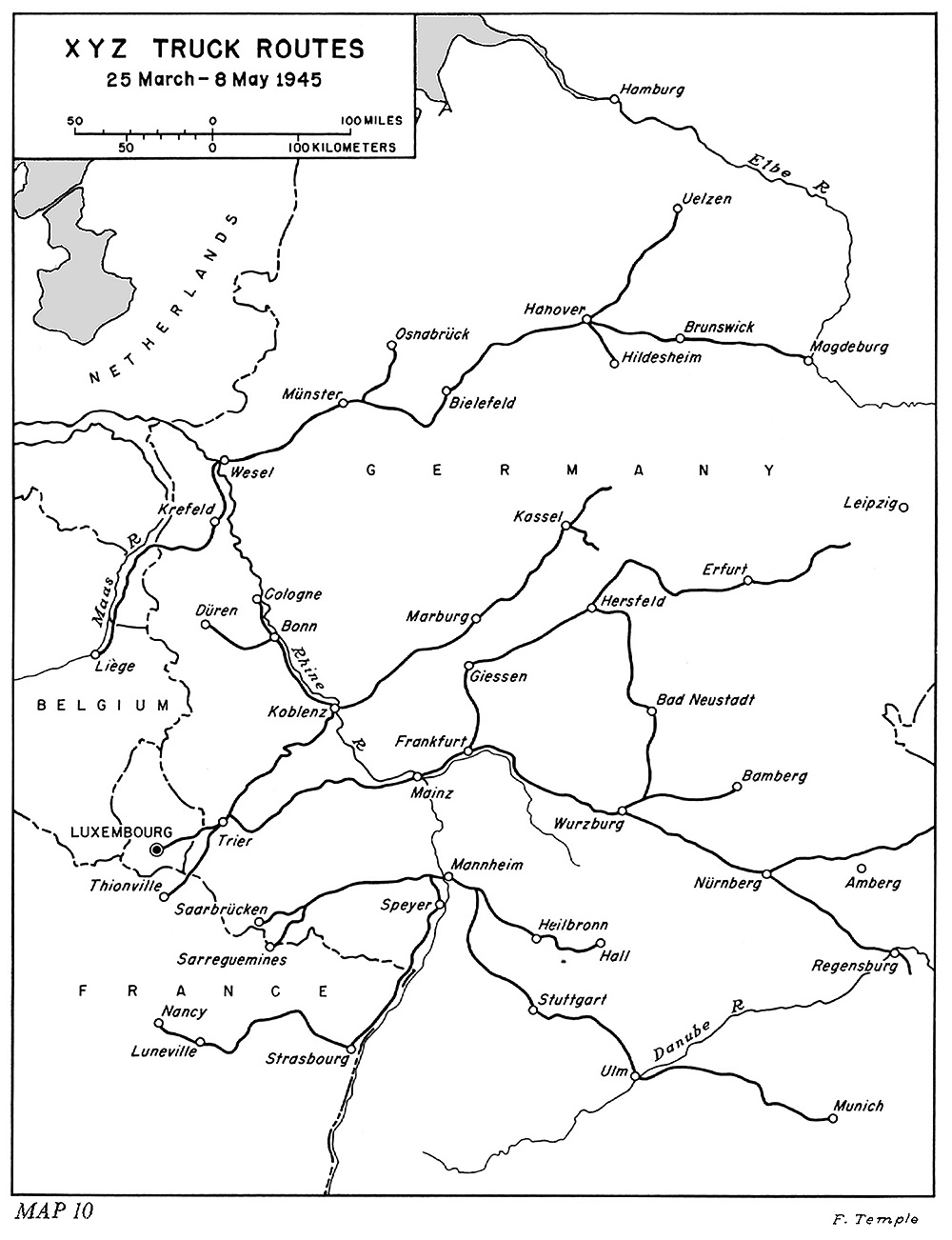
Truck routes in use by the US Army, 25 March – 8 May 1945

The Motor Transport Service (MTS) was formed in October 1944 from personnel from the four traffic regulation groups, one of which was a Women's Army Corps unit. By January 1945, its headquarters, the 6955th Headquarters and Headquarters Company, consisted of 55 officers and 128 enlisted personnel. Colonel Ross B. Warren assumed command on 5 December. The MTS had technical and operational control of motor transport units, but they remained administratively under the base sections, which also controlled them operationally on tasks within the borders of a single base section. The MTS placed emphasis on preventative maintenance, and managed to improve the average number of serviceable vehicles per company from 30 in November 1944 to 35 at the end of December, and attempted to raise it still further in 1945. While stressing the need for the proper care of tires, the MTS obtained an additional 16,053 tires and tubes.

Of the 198 truck companies in the MTS in January 1945, 104 operated standard 2½-ton 6×6 trucks. Some 1,800 semi-trailers and 690 truck-tractors were unloaded in Marseille, France, in November due to the limited reception capacity of the northern ports at the time, and thirty truck companies were sent there to be reequipped and retrained in their use. In the first three months of 1945 the MTS received 64 new companies. Of the thirty new companies that disembarked in the UK, only one had training with semi-trailers, so it trained the other twenty-nine in their use. Fourteen companies came to the ETO from the Persian Gulf Command, and were highly experienced with these vehicles, having operated them there for two years.

During the Rhineland operations and the preparations for the crossing of the Rhine, motor transport handled tremendous tonnages. In the period from 11 to 23 February 1945 motor transport moved 1,059,145 long tons (1,076,141 t) of stores and supplies, 81,472 tonnes (80,185 long tons; 89,808 short tons) per day, and 377,348 people. This rose to 1,737,601 long tons (1,765,484 t), a daily average of 108,600 long tons (110,300 t), in the period from 24 February to 11 March, when 634,425 personnel were moved.

It was anticipated that widespread destruction would hamper the ability of the railways to support operations beyond the Rhine, and motor transport would have to supplant rail. MTS planned another express route along the lines of the Red Ball Express of 1944. This plan was known as XYZ. It envisaged three phases, to meet different tonnage requirements: Plan X called for 55 companies with 2,750 vehicles to move 8,000 long tons (8,100 t) per day; Plan Y for 67 companies with 3,350 vehicles to move 10,000 long tons (10,000 t) per day; and Phase Z for 81 companies with 4,050 vehicles to move 10,000 long tons (10,000 t) per day. The four XYZ routes originated at Liège for the Ninth Army, Düren, Germany, for the First Army, Luxembourg City, Luxembourg, for the Third Army and Nancy, France, for the Seventh Army. Having separate routes eased congestion and reduced coordination issues.

==== XYZ program ====
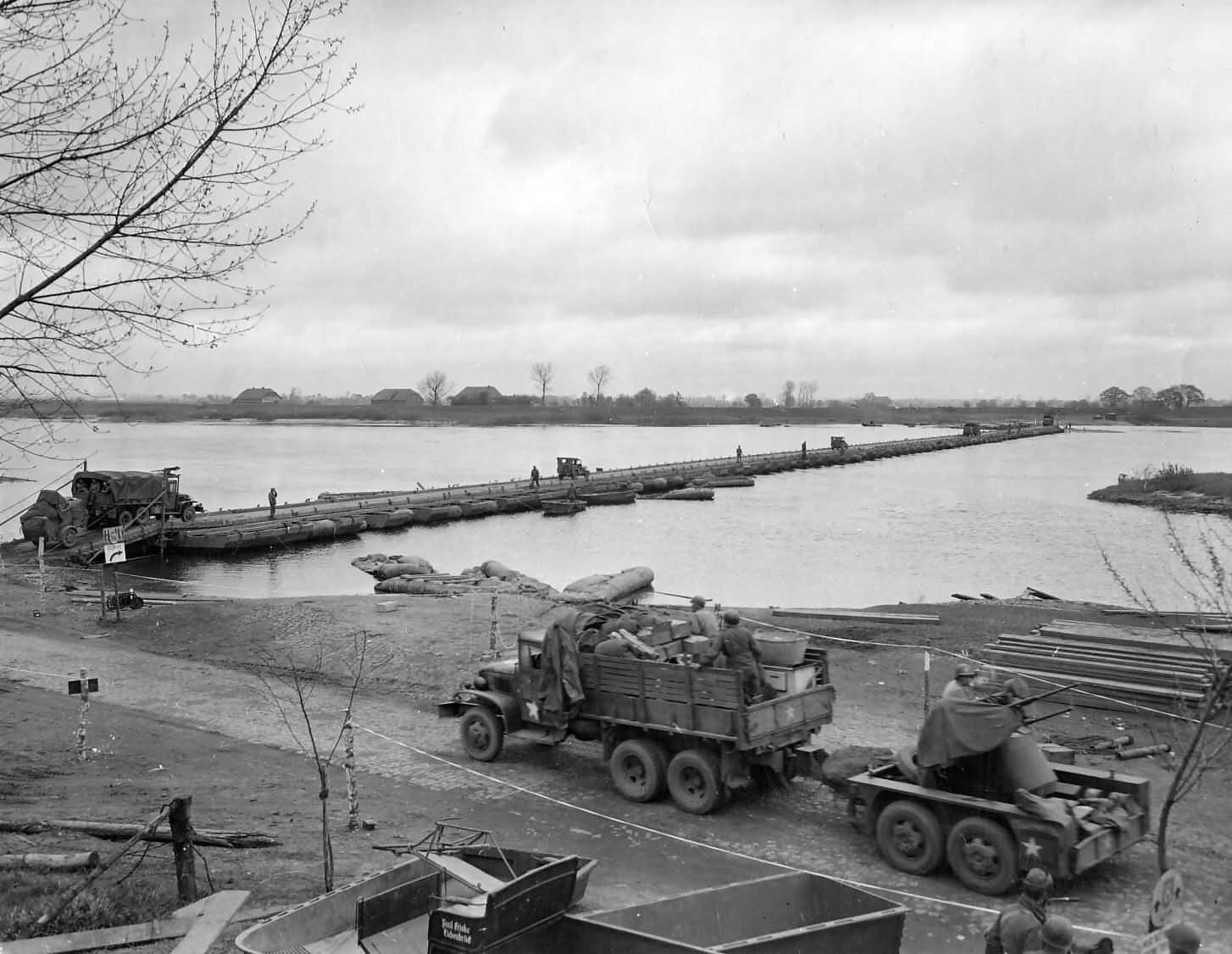
Ninth Army ponton bridge of the Elbe at Bleckede

The XYZ program came into effect on 25 March and lasted until 31 May. To control operations in the field, the MTS organized the 6956th Highway Transport Division (Provisional) to support the Ninth and First Armies, and the 6957th Highway Transport Division (Provisional) to support the Third Army. As the armies diverged and the distances between them increased, it became more difficult for the highway division to support two of them at once, and the 6958th Highway Transport Division (Provisional) was organized to support the First Army while the 469th Quartermaster Group performed this task for the Seventh Army along what became known as the Yellow Diamond route.

Although not nearly as well known as the Red Ball Express, XYZ was far more successful. It was characterized by superior planning, organization, execution and coordination. The drivers were far more experienced, especially the units that had come from Iran, and there were far more heavy trucks available. While hauls did exceed 200 miles (320 km) on occasion, the average was closer to 140 miles (230 km), which was much shorter than the Red Ball Express routes and allowed the drivers more rest time. This was partly attributable to the rapid advance of the railheads, but also to the work of 17,000 personnel employed on road maintenance. About 40 percent of these were military personnel; 35 percent were POWs and the rest were civilians. CONAD established "GI Joe Diners" at 50-mile (80 km) intervals where drivers could exchange their cold rations for a hot meal at any time, day or night.

XYZ was not without its difficulties. The biggest challenge was keeping the trucks running. Mechanics accompanied the convoys, and four hours of maintenance was given to trucks before they set out. Replacement vehicles and spare parts were slow to arrive owing to the distance from the supply depots in the intermediate and base sections. On the Yellow Diamond route, the shortage of tires was alleviated by the capture of a thousand German tires. The 2,000-US-gallon (7,600 L; 1,700 imp gal) tankers sprung leaks on the winding mountain roads, and large numbers of them became laid up for repairs. There were frequent changes of destination as the armies surged forward, and bottlenecks at bridges, many of which were one-way only.

The Third Army had a daily maintenance requirement of approximately 7,500 long tons (7,600 t), of which 2,000 long tons (2,000 t) was bulk POL. To meet this demand, the 6957th Highway Transport Division (Provisional) had 62 truck companies, 34 equipped with 10-ton semi-trailers and 14 with tankers. By the end of May, it had hauled 354,015 long tons (359,696 t) of supplies, nearly 30,000,000 US gallons (110,000,000 L) of bulk POL, and 381,019 personnel. The Ninth Army was supported by the 6956th Highway Transport Division (Provisional), with 15 truck companies, 12 equipped with 10-ton semi-trailers and the rest with 2,000-gallon tankers. They delivered 122,684 long tons (124,653 t) of supplies. The 6958th Highway Transportation Division (Provisional) supported the First Army with 31 truck companies that delivered 182,425 long tons (185,352 t) of supplies. Over the 63 days that XYZ was in operation, 871,895 long tons (885,886 t) of supplies were delivered, representing a daily average lift of 12,895 long tons (13,102 t).

As motor transport was drawn away from port clearance work, the danger of increased ship turnaround times arose. On 5 April, the COMZ G-4, Brigadier General Morris W. Gilland, asked the NYPE to defer the sailings of May convoys by five days, except for ships carrying certain vehicles, ammunition, bombs, rail cars and locomotives, which would save the ports from having to handle 60,000 long tons (61,000 t) of cargo.

=== Pipelines ===
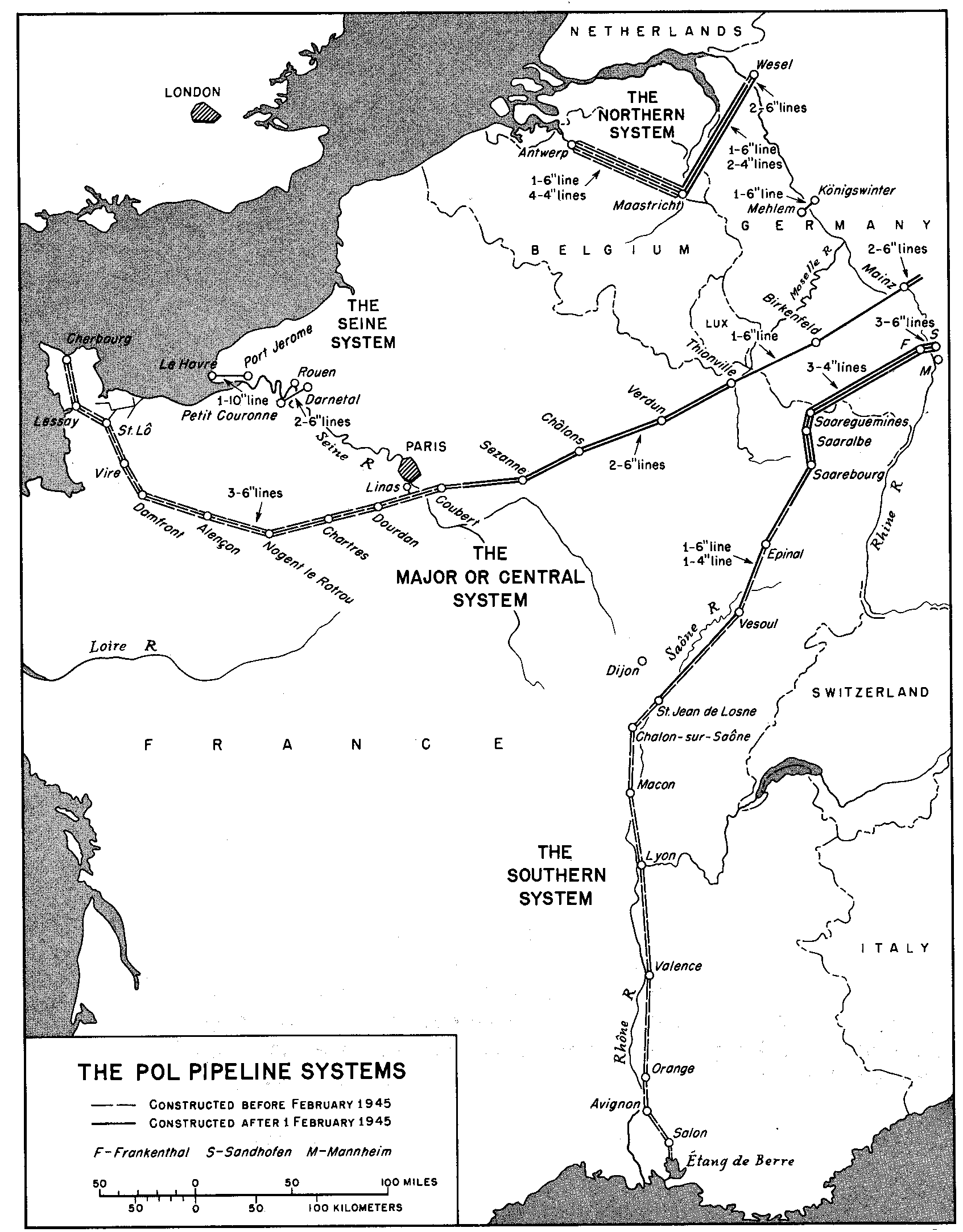
The POL pipeline systems

By February 1945, COMZ held stocks of 560,000 long tons (570,000 t) of POL, far in excess of the authorized sixty days of supply, and POL was being discharged at a rate of 13,000 long tons (13,000 t) through the ports of Antwerp, Cherbourg, Le Havre, and Port-de-Bouc. At this point the northern pipeline system from Antwerp had its terminus at Maastricht. This remained the case until 3 March, when work began on extending the pipeline to Wesel. This project faced considerable difficulties; deep mud on the initial stretch from Maastrict to Sittard in the Netherlands forced the engineers to hand-carry pipe; a shortage of 6-inch (150 mm) couplings forced them to weld pipe instead of joining it; the right of way beyond Sittard was found to be mined; and floods in the vicinity of the Roer compelled the engineers to suspend the pipe from cables. These obstacles were overcome and construction was completed and the extension in operation on 28 March. Extension of the major system from Cherbourg had begun in January and by February it had reached Châlons-sur-Marne, France. During March a 6-inch line was extended to Thionville. Meanwhile, the southern system originating at Marseille was extended to Sarralbe, France.

Pipelines were run across the Rhine independent of the systems. Gasoline would be delivered by tank car to the east bank and then pumped across the Rhine, thereby reducing motor vehicle traffic over the bridges. The first pipeline across the Rhine was laid at Mehlem near Remagen. Construction commenced on 25 March and the pipeline was in use three days later. The pipeline was extended to join an autobahn 10 miles (16 km) away, where storage tanks were erected. From there it was taken by tanker trucks to Giessen, Germany, to be decanted.

In the Third Army zone a pipeline was laid across the Rhine over a wrecked railway bridge at Mainz. This was in operation on 8 April, and connected to the major system on 22 April. The bridge it ran over was found to be unsafe, so it was replaced by two pipelines run across the railway bridge. The Seventh Army ran a pipeline across the Rhine over a Bailey bridge at Frankenthal, Germany, to a pipehead at Sandhofen, Germany, on the east bank. Work commenced on 7 April and was completed on 15 April. Two additional lines were subsequently added, one of them running over the river bed. The first 4-inch (10 cm) pipeline of the southern system reached Frankenthal on 20 April, followed by two more lines by the end of the month. At Wesel work began on 21 March and was completed on 3 April. It never operated independently though, because the northern pipeline from Antwerp reached Wesel on 28 March and the two pipelines were immediately linked.

Fuel consumption soared in April as the armies moved forward, sometimes exceeding 1,000,000 US gallons (3,800,000 L) in a single day. In the last days of April, deliveries began falling short of demand, and the reserves of the Third and Seventh Armies fell to less than two days. The Third Army was forced to begin rationing fuel, but POL shortages did not have a significant impact on operations.

=== Air supply ===
After SHAEF authorized the use of air transport to support the armies after the Rhine crossing, the Third Army put in a bid for 2,000 long tons (2,000 t) on 27 March. Poor flying weather prevented this being carried out immediately, but 329 aircraft of the IX Troop Carrier Command delivered 197,400 US gallons (747,000 L) of gasoline on 30 March. Air supply assumed great importance in April, peaking in the second week of the month when over 6,200 sorties were flown and 15,000 long tons (15,000 t) were landed at forward air fields. Elements of the 2nd Engineer Aviation Brigade followed advancing infantry and armored units and commenced rehabilitating air fields as soon as they were captured. If suitable, they would be used for delivering supplies by air.

The Third Army had the most extended supply lines, and made the most use of air supply. Between 30 March and 8 May it received about 27,000 long tons (27,000 t) of supplies by air, representing more than half of all air supply tonnage. Of this, 27,000 long tons (27,000 t), about 6,000,000 US gallons (23,000,000 L), was gasoline, accounting for 22 percent of the Third Army's gasoline receipts in that period. It also received a daily average of 50,000 rations by air, and occasionally critical items such as batteries and spare tires. During April the IX Troop Carrier Command made an average of 650 sorties each day, and delivered a daily average of 1,600 long tons (1,600 t). In the same month it also evacuated about 40,000 casualties and 135,000 Allied military personnel liberated from POW camps in Germany.

== After the German surrender ==
=== Redeployment ===
In October 1944, the War Department had instituted a policy whereby all requisitions were marked STO (for stop) for those that were to be automatically canceled when hostilities ended or SHP (for ship) for those that would continue to be filled. By April, requisitions for ordnance, engineer, medical and signal supplies were far outstripping consumption, but not until 5 May did ETOUSA ask for STO shipments to be canceled. This involved 1,280,000 long tons (1,300,000 t) of supplies. STO cargo at the NYPE was returned to the depots. Where STO cargo had already been stowed, it was allowed to be shipped. All STO items that were unloaded were kept segregated and returned on the next available vessel. Seventy-five ships were returned unloaded or reloaded with STO cargo.

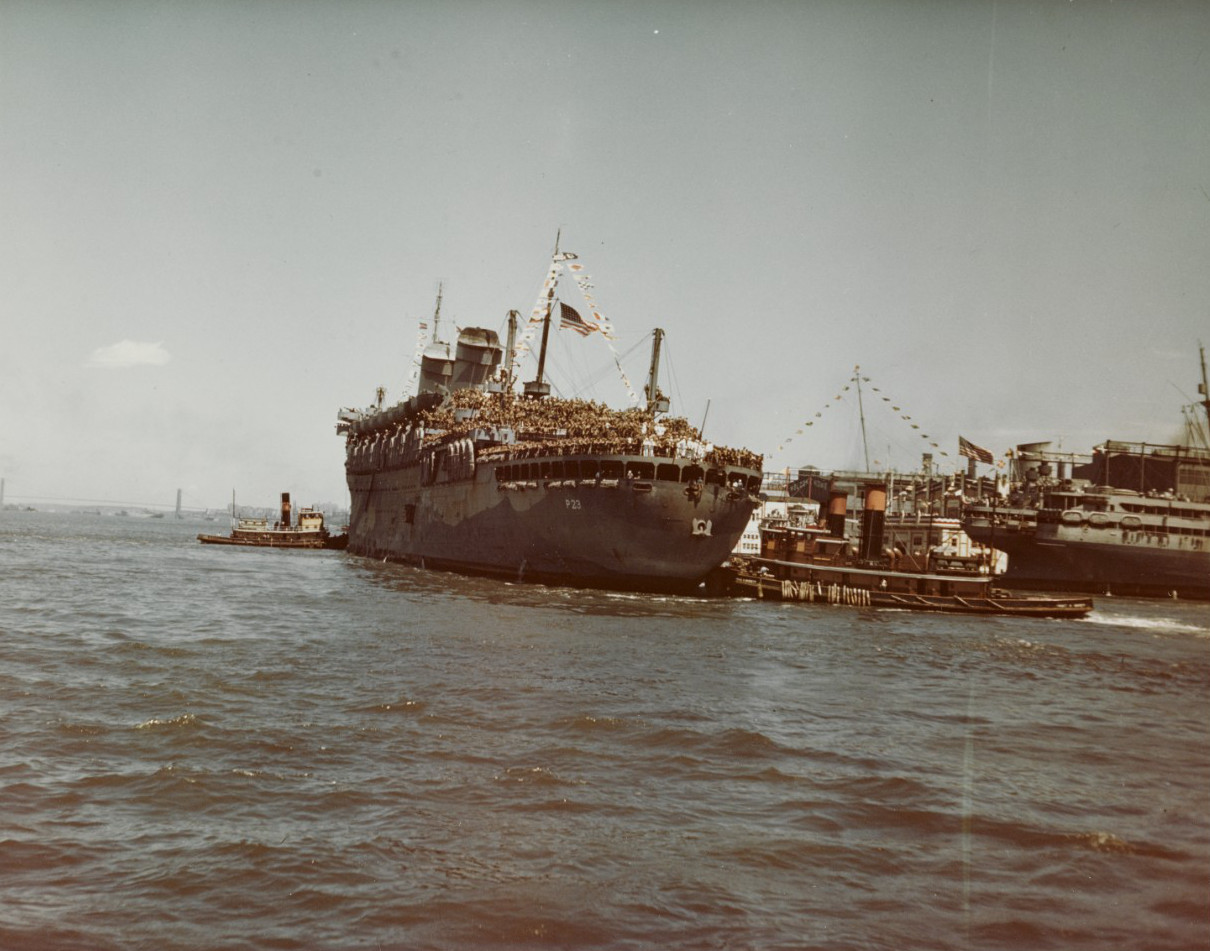
The troop transport USS West Point returns to New York with US soldiers.

With the end of the war in Europe on 8 May, there were 5,500,000 long tons (5,600,000 t) of supplies on the continent, of which 700,000 long tons (710,000 t) was ammunition. The German surrender did not end the war, for the United States was still at war with Japan. Units redeploying to the Pacific took their equipment with them. Everything else had to be repaired, packed and shipped to the Pacific or the United States, or disposed of. Plans called for the repair of 94,000,000 items of clothing, 160,000 motor vehicles, 255,000 radios and 21,000 pieces of construction equipment. These plans were disrupted by the sudden end of the war with Japan.

Planning for the redeployment of forces to the Pacific commenced in November 1944 when a Redeployment Planning Group was established as part of ETOUSA, reporting directly to the Chief of Staff of COMZ, Brigadier General Royal B. Lord. Some 395,900 troops were to be shipped direct from Europe to the Pacific between September 1945 and January 1946, while another 408,200 would go to the Pacific via the United States. Another 2,180,000 were to be demobilized under a points system. Redeployment commenced on 12 May 1945. Marseille was designated as the principal port for shipment direct to the Pacific, and Le Havre, Antwerp, and Liverpool, England, for shipment to the United States. Personnel were mainly shipped through Le Havre, where five staging areas were established, each named after a popular brand of cigarette. Direct shipment to the Pacific ended abruptly in August when Japan surrendered.

To accommodate the troops being demobilized, COMZ activated the Assembly Area Command, with Lord in command, on 9 April 1945. The Oise Intermediate Section built seventeen transit camps around Reims to hold up to 270,000 personnel awaiting repatriation to the United States for demobilization. This called for the construction of 5,000 huts, the erection of 33,000 tents, and the laying of 8,000,000 square feet (740,000 m^{2}) of concrete. Some 450,000 long tons (460,000 t) of rock was required for roads and hard standings and 34,000,000 board feet (80,000 m^{3}) of lumber for works. By the end of 1945, the Assembly Area Command had processed 600,000 troops. Redeployment of units ended on 26 February 1946.

On 12 May 1945, a theater order was issued officially separating the headquarters of ETOUSA and COMZ. This went into effect on 1 July, when the former was redesignated United States Forces European Theater, with its headquarters in Frankfurt. On 1 August, COMZ was redesignated Theater Service Forces, European Theater, with its headquarters still in Paris. The Bremen Port Command was created under the command of Major General Harry B. Vaughan, formerly the commander of the UK Base Section, to operate the port of Bremen, Germany, and administer the surrounding area, an American enclave in the British occupation zone in Germany.

=== Prisoners of war ===
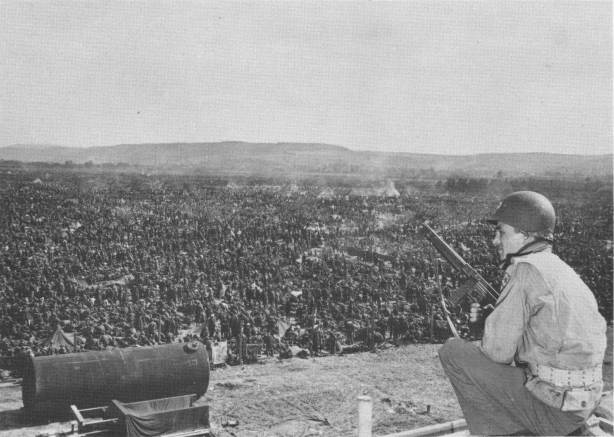
German prisoners of war near Remagen in 1945

When hostilities came to an end, COMZ was feeding 3,675,000 troops and 1,560,000 POWs, the latter mostly from captured stocks. The Third Geneva Convention of 1929 required that the US Army feed and care for POWs. This was partly sidestepped by a declaration by Eisenhower that this would only apply to those who had surrendered before 8 May 1945; those that surrendered after this date were classified as disarmed enemy forces (DEFs) instead. DEFs were not accorded the same treatment as POWs. Theoretically, the responsibility for feeding DEFs lay with the German civil authorities. DEFs received the same ration as the civilians, which could be as low as 500 calories (2,100 kJ) per day in some places.

In contrast, US soldiers had a diet of 3,500 calories (15,000 kJ) per day. It had been intended that US occupation forces would be fed by Germany, but under the conditions of food scarcity in post-war Europe, the reverse was very much the case, and the US shipped millions of tons of relief supplies to Germany. Many POWs and DEFs found employment supporting the US Army. On 30 September 1945, the US Army in Germany was employing 575,214 POWs and DEFs in 2,448 German service units. They assisted with felling trees, loading and unloading trucks, baking bread and maintaining motor vehicles.

== Outcome ==
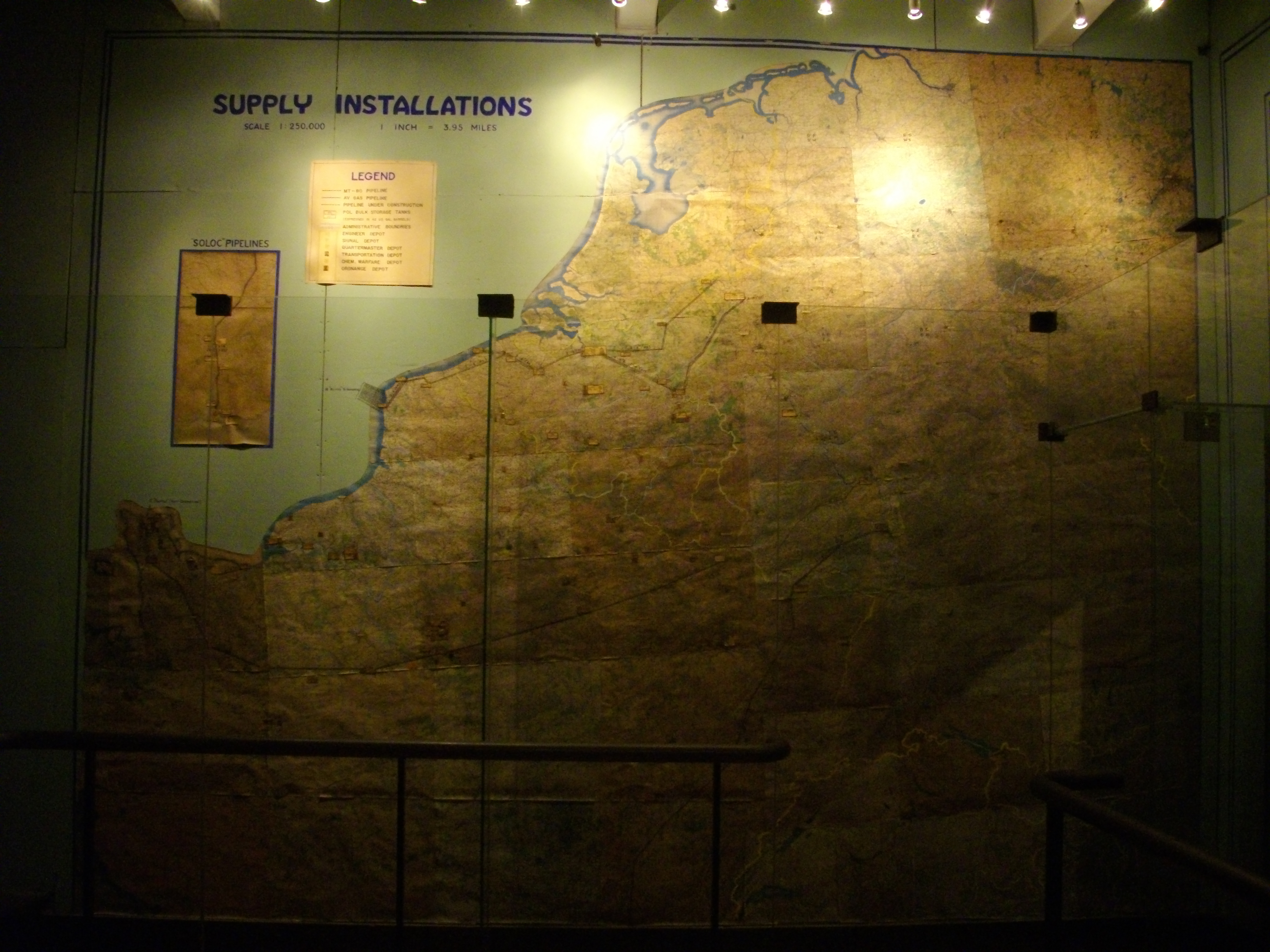
Map of supply installations in SHAEF

Once across the Rhine, combat losses in terms of tanks, other vehicles and equipment, and the expenditure of ammunition declined, while shortages of fuel and spare parts developed. This was to be expected in fast-moving mobile operations. The American logistics system was stretched, but nowhere near breaking point. The Deputy Chief Historian for the United States Army, Charles B. MacDonald, who participated in the campaigns as a company commander, wrote that "the credit in general belonged to a sound logistical apparatus expertly administered". That the American forces won the war is beyond dispute, as was the fact that, as the historian Roland Ruppenthal wrote, (Note: Ruppenthal also served in the campaign, but as the Third Army historical officer.) "It can hardly be claimed that US forces operated on a shoestring. In fact, few armies in history have been as bountifully provided for."

There remained a lingering impression that the American logistical system could have performed better and more efficiently. The most intractable problem was that of the command setup, with ETOUSA-COMZ being the official theater staff, but many of the functions of a general headquarters being exercised by SHAEF. The ETO also had manpower shortages and achieving the right balance between operational and logistical units was a difficult one. The logistical system of ports, depots, railways, highways, pipelines and hospitals formed a highly complex system with a multitude of moving parts, and managing something so complicated inevitably involved inefficiencies.

== See also ==
- British logistics in the Western Allied invasion of Germany
