= American logistics in the Normandy campaign =

Supplies services during World War II (1939–1945)

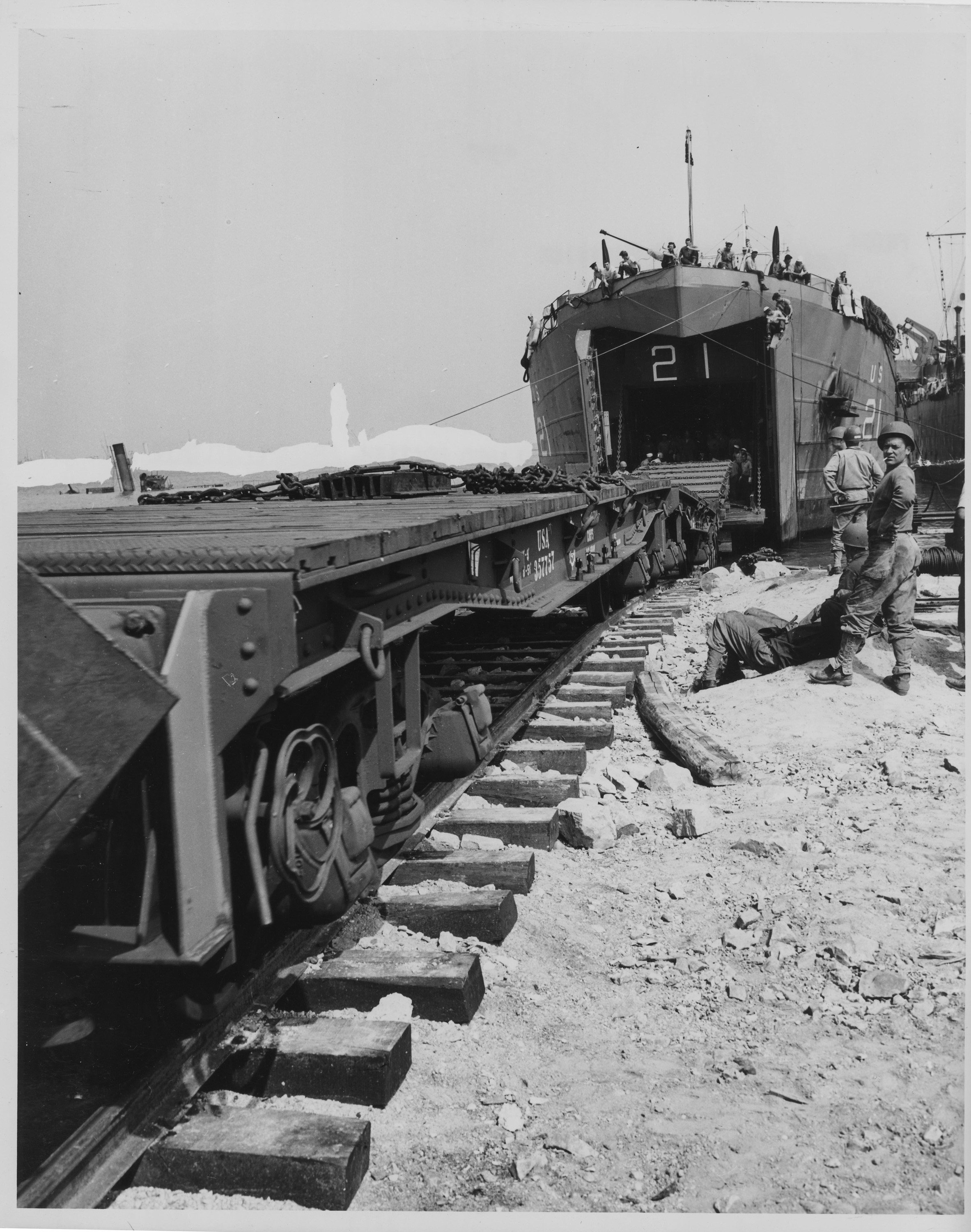
USS LST-21 unloads railway cars in Normandy in June 1944.

American logistics played a key role in the success of Operation Overlord, the Allied invasion of northwest Europe during World War II. The campaign officially commenced on D-Day, 6 June 1944, and ended on 24 July, the day before the launch of Operation Cobra. The Services of Supply (SOS) was formed under the command of Major General John C. H. Lee in May 1942 to provide logistical support to the European Theater of Operations, United States Army. From February 1944 on, the SOS was increasingly referred to as the Communications Zone (COMZ). Between May 1942 and May 1944, Operation Bolero, the buildup of American troops and supplies in the UK, proceeded fitfully and by June 1944 1,526,965 US troops were in the UK, of whom 459,511 were part of the COMZ.

The Overlord plan called for the early capture of Cherbourg, and a rapid American advance to secure the Brittany ports and Quiberon Bay, which was to be developed as a port. Crucially, the logistical plan called for a one-month pause at the Seine River, which Allied forces were expected to reach 90 days after D-Day, before advancing further. The expectation of an advance at a prescribed rate, while necessary for planning purposes, built inflexibility into a logistics plan that already had little margin for error. Staff studies confirmed that Overlord could be supported if everything went according to plan.

The First United States Army was supported over the Omaha and Utah Beaches, and through the Mulberry artificial port at Omaha specially constructed for the purpose, but the American Mulberry was abandoned after it was damaged by a storm on 19–22 June. During the first seven weeks after D-Day, the advance was much slower than the Operation Overlord plan had anticipated, and the lodgment area much smaller. The nature of the fighting in the Normandy bocage country created shortages of certain items, particularly artillery and mortar ammunition, and there were unexpectedly high rates of loss of bazookas, Browning automatic rifles (BARs), and M7 grenade launchers.

== Background ==
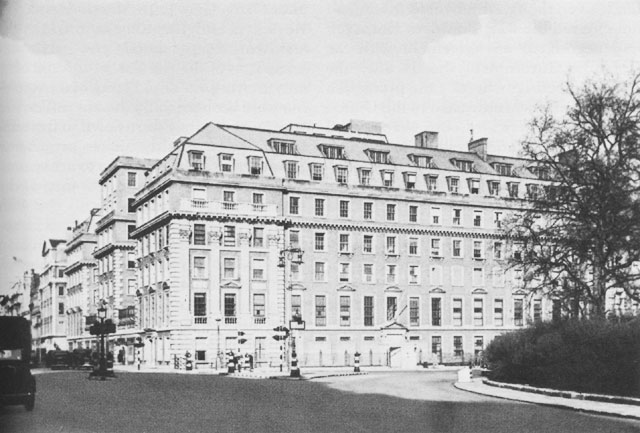
Headquarters, ETO, at 20 Grosvenor Square, London

During the 1920s and 1930s, the United States had developed and periodically updated War Plan Black for the possibility of a war with Germany. Planning began in earnest at the ABC-1 Conference in Washington, D.C., in January to March 1941, where agreement was reached with the UK and Canada on a Europe first strategy in the event of the US being forced into a war with both Germany and Japan. A US military mission to the UK called the Special Observer Group (SPOBS) was formed under the command of Major General James E. Chaney, a United States Army Air Corps officer who had been stationed in the UK since October 1940 to observe air operations. Chaney opened SPOBS headquarters at the US Embassy at 1 Grosvenor Square, London, on 19 May 1941, and moved it across the street to 20 Grosvenor Square two days later. Henceforth, Grosvenor Square would be the hub of American activity in the UK.

In the wake of the American entry into World War II in December 1941, the War Department activated the United States Army Forces in the British Isles (USAFBI) under Chaney's command on 8 January 1942. Under the ABC-1 and Rainbow 5 war plans, the United States would participate in the defense of the UK, but the Chief of Staff of the United States Army, General George C. Marshall, had a larger role in mind. In April 1942, Marshall and Harry L. Hopkins, the principal foreign policy advisor to the president, visited the UK, and obtained the approval of the prime minister of the United Kingdom and the British Chiefs of Staff Committee for Operation Bolero, the buildup of US forces in the UK with the aim of eventually mounting a cross-Channel attack. With this prospect in mind, Chaney asked the War Department for personnel to form a Services of Supply (SOS) command.

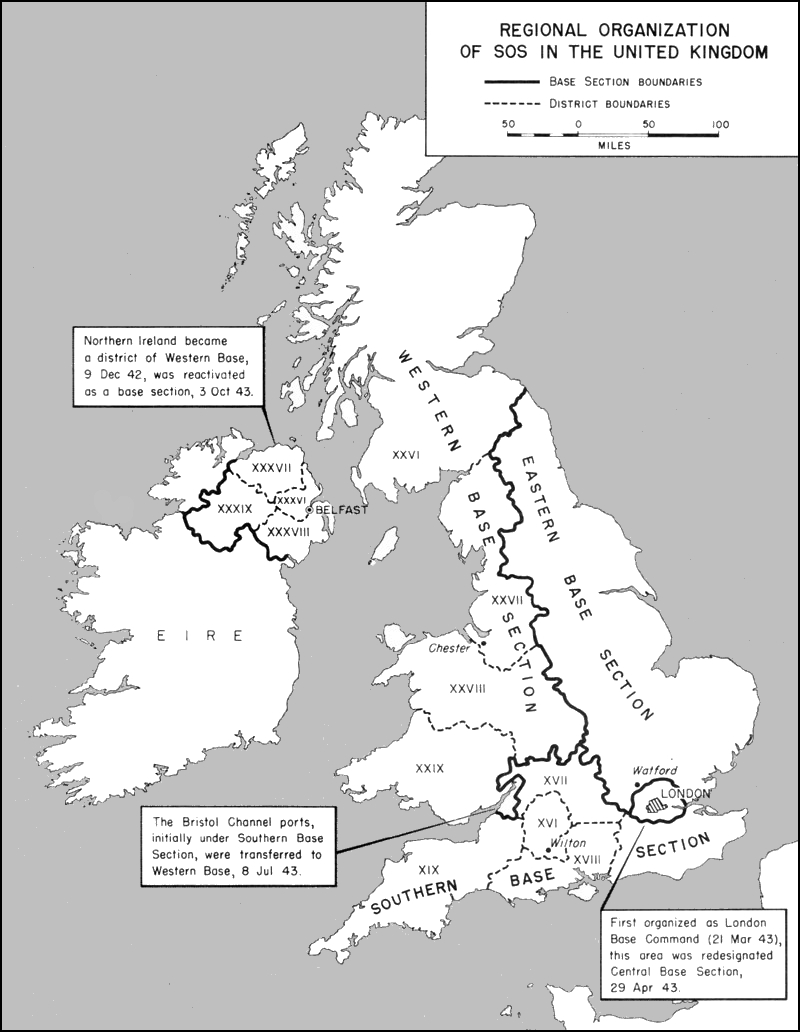
Regional Organization of SOS in the United Kingdom

Chaney's proposed SOS organizational structure did not meet with the approval of the War Department. On 9 March 1942, Marshall had conducted a sweeping reorganization that consolidated logistical functions in the US under the United States Army Services of Supply (USASOS), headed by Major General Brehon B. Somervell. Chaos had resulted during World War I because the organization of the SOS in France was different from that of the War Department, and an important lesson of that war was the need for the theater SOS organization to parallel that in the United States. Marshall and Somervell wanted it led by someone familiar with the new organization, and selected Major General John C. H. Lee, who had previously commanded the Pacific Ports of Embarkation in the United States. Each branch head in Somervell's headquarters was asked to nominate his best two men, one of whom was selected by Somervell and Lee for SOS headquarters, while the other remained in Washington. Lee held the first meeting of his new staff on 16 May, before departing for the UK on 23 May, and Chaney formally activated SOS the following day.

On 8 June 1942, the War Department upgraded USAFBI to the status of a theater of war, becoming the European Theater of Operations, United States Army (ETOUSA). Chaney was recalled to the US, and replaced by the chief of the Operations Division at the War Department, Major General Dwight D. Eisenhower. Accommodation for the SOS headquarters was initially provided in an apartment building at No 1 Great Cumberland Place in London, but something larger was required. Brigadier General Claude N. Thiele, the SOS Chief of Administrative Services, found 500,000 square feet (46,000 m^{2}) of office space in Cheltenham. Intended as an evacuation point for the British War Office in the event that London had to be evacuated, the staff stationed there were in the process of moving back to London. The site had adequate road, rail and signal communications, but the 90-mile (140 km) distance from London was a disadvantage. Lee opened SOS headquarters in Cheltenham on 25 July.

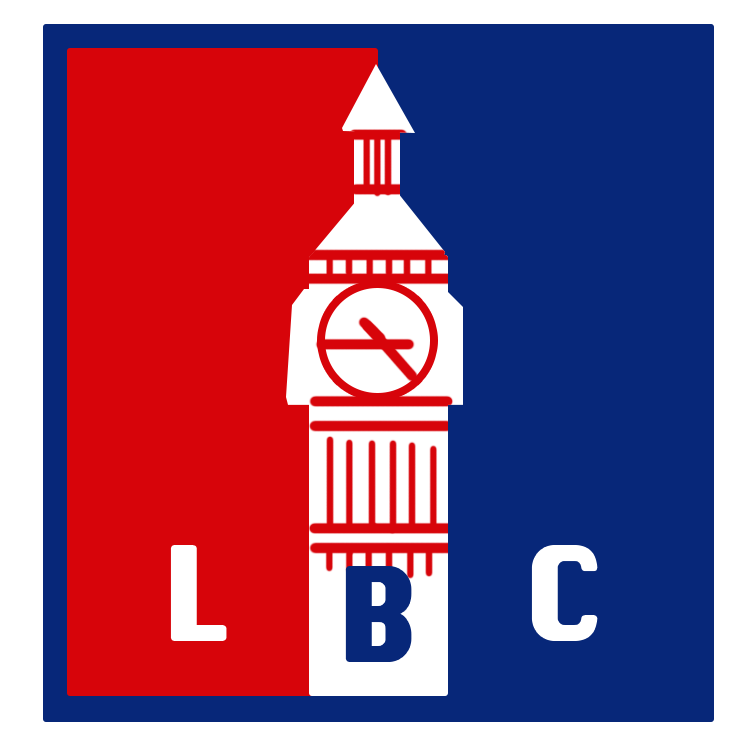
London Base Command Patch

Lee announced a regional organization of SOS on 20 July. It was divided into four base commands corresponding to the British Army's territorial commands. The Northern Ireland Base Section, under Brigadier General Leroy P. Collins, with its headquarters at Belfast, included all of Northern Ireland; the Western Base Section, under Davison, had its headquarters at Chester; the Eastern Base Section, under Colonel Cecil R. Moore, had its headquarters at Watford; and the Southern Base Section, under Colonel Charles O. Thrasher, had its headquarters at Wilton, Wiltshire. The London Base Command, created within ETOUSA in 1942 under the command of Brigadier General Pleas B. Rogers, was transferred to SOS on 21 March 1943 and renamed "Central Base Section" on 29 April. Over time each of the base sections acquired its own character, with the Western Base Section principally concerned with the reception of troops and supplies, the Eastern with supporting the Air Force, and the Southern with hosting marshalling and training areas. The doctrinal concept behind the base section concept was of "centralized control and decentralized operation", but reconciling the two proved difficult in practice.

== Planning and preparations ==
=== Bolero ===
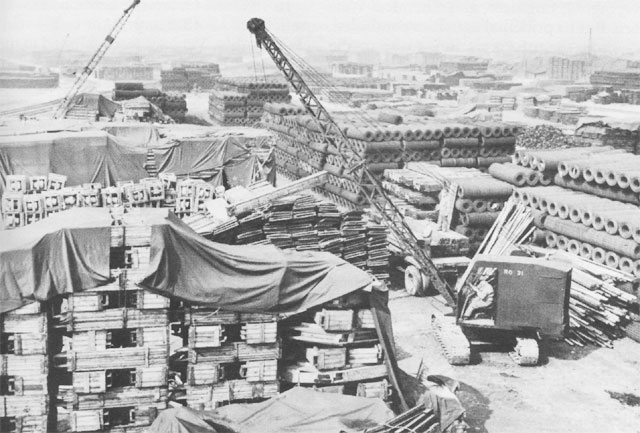
General Depot at Ashchurch, north of Cheltenham. Originally developed as a British automotive depot, this was handed over to SOS in 1942. It consisted of 158 buildings, including 10 hangars and three warehouses. Nearly 3,000 US personnel worked there in August 1942.

Bolero was derailed by the decision taken in July 1942 to abandon Operation Sledgehammer, the proposed 1942 cross-channel attack, in favor of Operation Torch, an invasion of French Northwest Africa. This made Operation Roundup, the prospective cross-channel attack in 1943, unlikely. Doubtful that sufficient shipping was available to support both Bolero and Torch, Somervell ordered all construction work in the UK to cease, except on airfields, but the British government went ahead anyway, using materials and labor supplied under Reverse Lend-Lease. After the Casablanca Conference in January 1943, American resources became available again, and eventually the works completed included 6,489,335 square feet (602,879 m^{2}) of covered storage, 37,915,645 square feet (3,522,479 m^{2}) of open storage and hardstands, and facilities for storage of 169,320 long tons (172,040 t) of petrol, oil and lubricants (POL).

Roundup was not carried out, but Bolero survived, strengthened by the decision at the 1943 Washington Conference (codenamed "Trident") to mount the cross-channel attack with a target date of 1 May 1944. The planners at Trident envisioned shipping 1.3 million US troops to the UK by that date. Effecting this required the ports in the UK to handle up to 150 ships per month. Progress was disappointing, but record shipments of men in the last quarter of the year boosted the strength of ETOUSA to 773,753 by the end of 1943, of whom 220,200 were in the SOS.

To take advantage of the longer daylight hours of summer, a system of preshipment was instituted, whereby unit equipment was shipped to the UK in advance of the units. Rather than lose training time packing all its equipment, personnel could sail to the UK, and draw a new set of equipment there. The major obstacle to the idea was that not all commodities were available in surplus in the US. Indeed the Army Service Forces (ASF), as USASOS had been renamed on 12 March 1943, had difficulty filling the available shipping. Of 1,012,000 measurement tons (1,146,000 m^{3}) of cargo space available in July, only 780,000 measurement tons (880,000 m^{3}) were used; of 1,122,000 measurement tons (1,271,000 m^{3}) available in August, only 730,000 measurement tons (830,000 m^{3}). Of the 2,304,000 measurement tons (2,610,000 m^{3}) shipped in May through August, 39 percent was preshipped cargo. This rose to 457,868 measurement tons (518,615 m^{3}) or 54 percent of the 850,000 measurement tons (960,000 m^{3}) shipped in November, but most of this was consumed re-equipping three of the four divisions that were transferred from the North African Theater of Operations (NATOUSA).

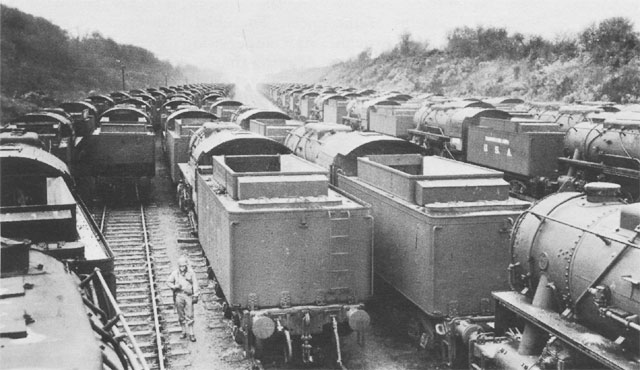
US-built locomotives stockpiled in Wales for Operation Overlord

The main points of entry for US cargo were the ports on the Clyde and the Mersey, and those of the Bristol Channel; ports on the south and east coasts of the UK were subject to attack by German aircraft and submarines, and were avoided until late 1943, when shipments began to exceed the capacity of the other ports. The Clyde ports were remote from the main supply depots, but were used as the main debarkation points for US troops, accounting for 873,163 (52 percent) of the 1,671,010 US personnel arrivals, but only 1,138,000 measurement tons (1,289,000 m^{3}) (8 percent) of cargo.

The majority of troops travelled across the Atlantic on ocean liners like the RMS Queen Elizabeth and Queen Mary. Making three round-trip voyages per month carrying up to 15,000 passengers each time, these two liners alone carried 24 percent of troop arrivals. They were supplemented by other liners, including the RMS Aquitania and Mauretania, and the SS Île de France, Nieuw Amsterdam and Bergensfjord, which accounted for another 36 percent. The troops debarked into ship's tenders, and boarded quayside trains to their destinations.

The Bristol Channel ports and the Mersey ports handled 9,750,000 measurement tons (11,040,000 m^{3}) (70 percent) of the cargo brought to the UK, including most of the heavy items like tanks, artillery pieces and ammunition. This was not accomplished without difficulty; most of the cargo handling equipment was old and outdated, and it was not possible to follow the standard US practice of moving goods from the quayside on pallets with forklifts. Trade unions opposed the use of military labor except when civilian labor was unavailable, but this ban was lifted when the volume of cargo became too great, and by May 1944 fifteen US port battalions were working the UK ports.

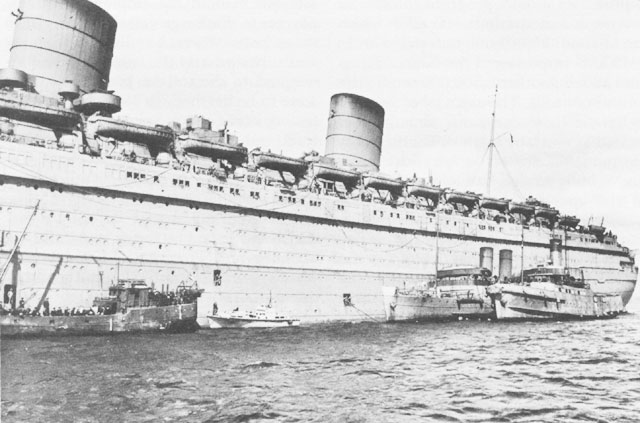
Tenders alongside the RMS Queen Elizabeth at Gourock, Scotland

SOS found the textbook concept of shipping cargo from the port to distribution centers, sorting it there, and despatching it to branch depots too extravagant in its use of scarce depot space and the overburdened British railway system. Moreover shipping manifests were often found to be incomplete, inaccurate or illegible, and despite being sent by air mail still frequently failed to arrive in advance of the cargo. SOS ultimately persuaded a reluctant ASF to accept a system whereby every item shipped was individually labelled with a requisition number that provided a complete UK destination address.

SOS prevailed upon ASF to implement a system called "prestowage", under which ships were loaded in the United States with blocks of supplies that included rations, equipment and ammunition. These 54 ships acted as floating depots, and were retained in UK waters until called forward. By having only their deck cargo unloaded in the UK, they did not burden the UK ports, but the practice was frowned upon by ASF because it indefinitely tied up valuable shipping. Also, nearly 150 ships were despatched in May, June and July "commodity loaded"—loaded entirely with a single class of supply. Most were held in the UK without unloading until called forward, although some sailed directly to Normandy from the United States.

The railways were used to move cargo wherever possible, as the narrow rural roads and village streets of rural England were not conducive to use by large trucks, but as cargo volumes increased, road transport had to be resorted to, and in the eight months from October 1943 to May 1944, trucks carried 1,000,000 long tons (1,000,000 t), or about a third of the cargo from the ports. The railways had challenges of their own, with limited head room and tunnel clearances that impeded the carriage of bulky items like tanks. Locomotives were in short supply and in 1942 the British railways arranged for 400 locomotives to be shipped from the US under Lend-Lease. The order was later increased to 900, and in 1943 they were arriving at a rate of fifty per month.

The US buildup in the UK was largely accomplished in the first five months of 1944. In this period, another 752,663 troops arrived, bringing the total theater strength to 1,526,965. Of these, 459,511 were in the SOS. Some 6,106,500 measurement tons (6,916,700 m^{3}) of cargo arrived in the same period. Clearing it involved running 100 special freight trains totalling to 20,000 loaded cars each week. The limit on ship arrivals was raised from 109 to 120 in March, then to 140. Shipments in excess of the previously agreed limits were possible only because of the postponement of the invasion date from May to June. This postponement, primarily to gain an extra month's production of landing craft for the enlarged landing plan, cost a month in which the weather over the English Channel was the best it had been in forty years. May was also the month when the Germans sowed Cherbourg Harbor with oyster mines.

The pressure on the UK transportation system became acute in May when the troops began moving to their staging areas. By 18 May SOS was forced to inform the New York Port of Embarkation that no more than 120 ships could be accepted. By this time the New York Port of Embarkation had a backlog of 540,000 measurement tons (610,000 m^{3}) of cargo and a deficit of 61 ships that were required to move it. This meant that the follow-up force for the invasion, the Third Army, would have only 60 percent of its wheeled vehicles by the end of June.

=== Organization ===
ETOUSA/COMZ shoulder sleeve insignia

NATOUSA was created under Eisenhower on 6 February 1943, and Lieutenant General Frank M. Andrews succeeded him at ETOUSA. Andrews had SOS headquarters moved back to London, but his tenure in command was brief, as he was killed in an air crash on 3 May 1943. He was replaced by Lieutenant General Jacob L. Devers. The British had already activated the 21st Army Group in July 1943, but several months passed before Devers prevailed on the War Department to authorize American counterparts. The First United States Army Group (FUSAG) was activated on 16 October 1943, with its headquarters at Bryanston Square in London. Devers had Lieutenant General Omar N. Bradley reassigned to ETOUSA to command it. Bradley commanded both the First Army Group and the First United States Army, which opened its headquarters in Bristol on 20 October, and assumed control of all US ground forces in the UK three days later.

An outcome of the Casablanca Conference was that in April 1943 the British Chiefs of Staff designated British Lieutenant General Frederick E. Morgan as the Chief of Staff to the Supreme Allied Commander, with the immediate mission of planning the cross-channel operation, codenamed Operation Overlord. The staff he gathered around him became known by his own abbreviation, COSSAC. Eisenhower returned to the UK on 16 January 1944, and became the Supreme Allied Commander. COSSAC was absorbed into his new headquarters, known as the Supreme Headquarters Allied Expeditionary Force (SHAEF). Eisenhower also took over ETOUSA, but tended to rely on his SHAEF staff.

As a consequence, ETOUSA had lost most of its functionality, and was consolidated with SOS in January 1944. From then until June it had an organization and procedures closely resembling those described in the US Army manuals. This combined headquarters was increasingly referred to as the Communications Zone (COMZ), although this did not become official until 7 June. Eisenhower announced that until several armies were active on the continent, all ground forces on there would be come under the British 21st Army Group, now commanded by General Bernard Montgomery. On 9 February SHAEF ordered FUSAG and COMZ to supply American liaison elements to the 21st Army Group. ETOUSA had already activated its element two days before as the Forward Echelon, Communications Zone (FECOMZ), with Brigadier General Harry B. Vaughan, the Western Base Section commander, in command, and Colonel Frank M. Albrecht as his chief of staff.

Another organization was activated on 7 February: the Advance Section (ADSEC), under the command of Colonel Ewart G. Plank. Experience in the Italian campaign had demonstrated the value of a logistical agency that worked closely with the army it was supporting. ADSEC would take over the operation of base areas, supply dumps and communications from the First Army as it moved forward. In the initial stages of Overlord, ADSEC would be attached to the First Army. COMZ also began organizing base sections for service in France. In March the five districts of the Eastern Base Section were consolidated into one, which became the VIII District of the Western Base Section in April. On 1 May, Base Section No. 1 was activated under the command of Colonel Roy W. Growler, and held in readiness for service in Brittany. On 1 June Base Section No. 2 was activated under the command of Collins.

=== Planning ===
The logistical planners saw the campaign unfolding in three stages. In the first, an automatic supply system would be used, with materiel dispatched on a predetermined schedule. In the second stage, which would occur after a lodgment was secured and supply depots began functioning, the system would become semi-automatic, with items like ammunition shipped on the basis of status reports. In the third stage, which would occur when the major ports were opened and the supply system was functioning smoothly, all items would be sent on requisition. In the event, the war ended before the third stage was achieved.

Since the first three months of supply shipments were determined in advance, and the first two weeks already loaded on ships, three expedients were prepared to cover unanticipated shortfalls. The first was codenamed the "Red Ball Express". Starting on D plus 3 (three days after D-Day), 100 measurement tons (110 m^{3}) per day were set aside for emergency requests. Such shipments would be expedited. The second, codenamed "Greenlight", provided for 600 measurement tons (680 m^{3}) of ammunition and engineer equipment to be substituted for scheduled shipments of engineer supplies. This would become available from D plus 14 onwards, and Greenlight supplies would take up to six days for delivery. Finally, supplies were packed with parachutes for aerial delivery to isolated units, and plans were made for the delivery of 6,000 pounds (2,700 kg) of supplies per day by air once airfields had been secured, with 48 hours warning.

The Overlord plan called for the early capture of Cherbourg, and a rapid American advance to secure the Brittany ports and Quiberon Bay, which was to be developed as a port. Crucially, the logistical plan called for a one-month pause at the Seine River, which was expected to be reached by D plus 90, before continuing the advance to the German border. The expectation of an advance at a prescribed rate, while necessary for planning purposes, built inflexibility into a logistics plan that already had little margin for error. Staff studies confirmed that Overlord could be supported if everything went according to plan.

== Assault ==
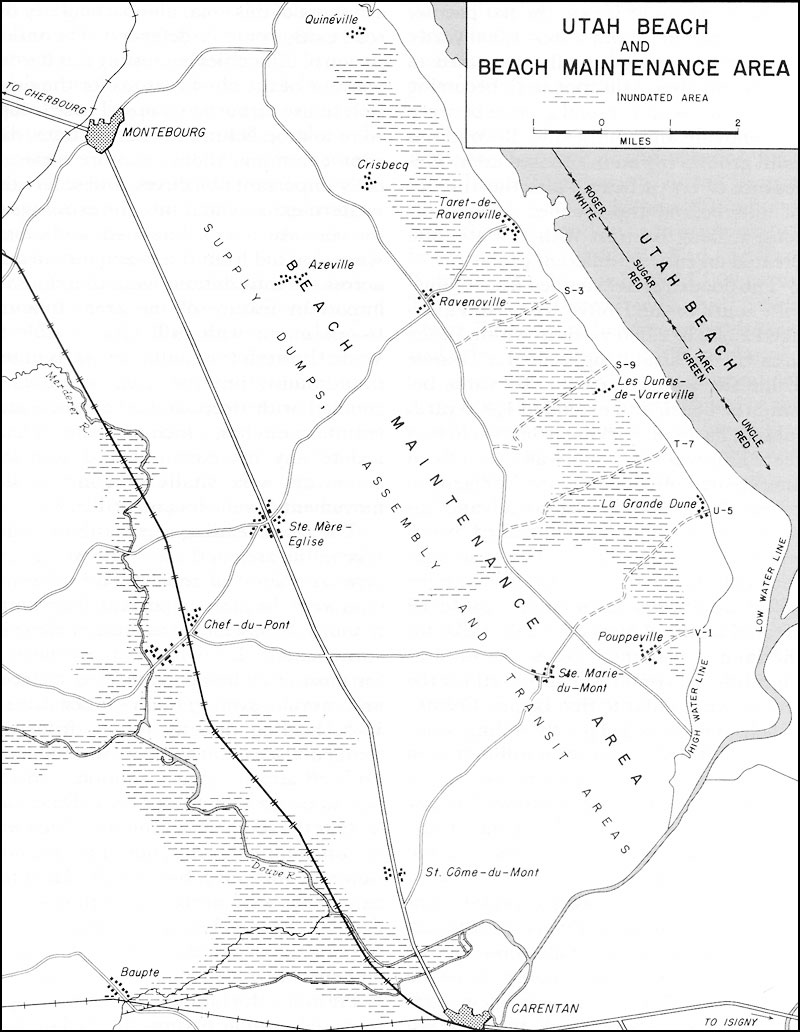
Utah Beach and beach maintenance area

The Southern Base Section consisted of four districts, numbered XVI, XVII, XVIII and XIX. The XVIII District was responsible for mounting the assault force for Omaha Beach, while the XIX district handled the one for Utah Beach. Together they contained 95 marshalling camps with a capacity for 187,000 troops and 28,000 vehicles. The other two districts, the XVI and XVII, were responsible for mounting the glider-borne elements of the 82nd and 101st Airborne Divisions.

In the opening phase of Overlord, supplies would arrive over the beaches. Operation of the beachheads was assigned to the engineer special brigades. Their name was misleading because, as well as three engineer battalions, each contained amphibious truck and port companies, and quartermaster, ordnance, medical, military police, signals and chemical warfare units. Along with bomb disposal squads, naval beach parties, maintenance and repair parties and other troops attached for the mission, each had a strength of 15,000 to 20,000 men.

Utah Beach would be operated by the 1st Engineer Special Brigade, under the command of Brigadier General James E. Wharton; Omaha by the Provisional Special Brigade Group, consisting of the 5th and 6th Engineer Special Brigades and the 11th Port, commanded by Brigadier General William M. Hoge. The 11th Port had a strength of over 7,600 men; it included four port battalions, five amphibious truck companies, three quartermaster service companies, and three quartermaster truck companies.

The engineers landing on Omaha Beach on D-Day, 6 June, found the beach swept by artillery and automatic weapons fire that the infantry was unable to suppress, and the beach littered with disabled vehicles and landing craft. Only five of the sixteen engineer teams arrived at their assigned locations, and they had only six of their sixteen tank dozers, five of which were soon knocked out. They were only able to clear five narrow lanes through the obstacles instead of the planned sixteen 50-yard (46 m) gaps. As the infantry advanced, the engineers filled in anti-tank ditches, cleared minefields, demolished obstacles, opened three exits, and established the first supply dumps.

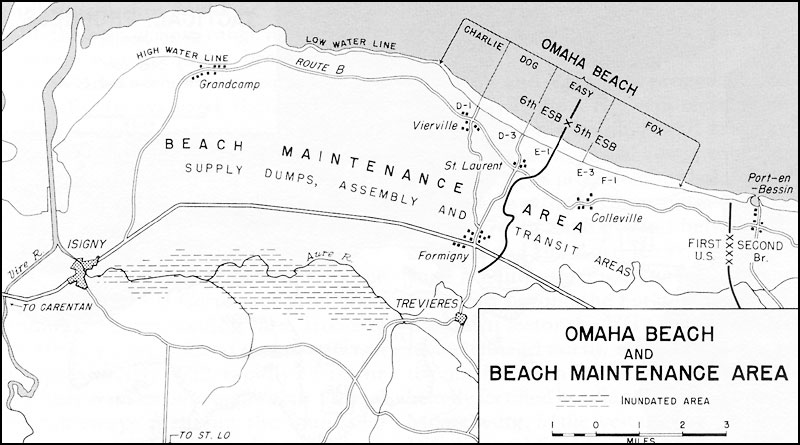
Omaha Beach and beach maintenance area

The first waves came ashore on Utah Beach about 2,000 yards (1,800 m) south of the intended landing beaches. The beach fortifications were much weaker than the intended beaches, but the distance between the low and high watermarks was much greater. Because the beach obstacles were fewer than expected, the engineers were able to clear the entire beach of obstacles rather than just 50-yard (46 m) gaps. Beach dumps could not be established as planned because the areas had not been captured.

Individual riflemen arriving on the beaches were overburdened, carrying at least 68 pounds (31 kg) of equipment. This overburdening had been noted during landing exercises, but instead of reducing the load, another 15 pounds (6.8 kg) had been added. The inability of the troops to move quickly had lethal consequences, especially on the deadly Omaha beach. Unneeded equipment was often discarded. The demonstration of the Army's prodigality inculcated a culture of wastefulness that had undesirable consequences.

The US military was racially segregated during World War II, with most African American soldiers belonging to service units. Of the 29,714 troops that landed on Omaha Beach on D-Day, only about 500 were African Americans; of the 31,912 who landed on Utah Beach, approximately 1,200 were African Americans. Their numbers increased over the following weeks as more service units arrived.

== Build-up ==
=== Shipping ===
Build-up priority lists had been drawn up months in advance that specified in what order units were to embark for Normandy during the first ninety days. To regulate the movement of ships and landing craft with maximum economy, a special organization was established called Build Up Control (BUCO). This operated under the tactical commanders, the First Army in the US case, on the British committee system, with representatives of the Allied Naval Commander, Ministry of War Transport and War Shipping Administration. BUCO was chaired by British Brigadier G. C. Blacker, with Lieutenant Colonel Eli Stevens as the head of the US Zone Staff. It had three subordinate agencies: Movement Control (MOVCO), which issued orders for unit movements; Turnaround Control (TURCO), which liaised with the Navy and engineer special brigades; and Embarkation Control (EMBARCO), which handled the location of units and the availability of space in the marshaling areas.

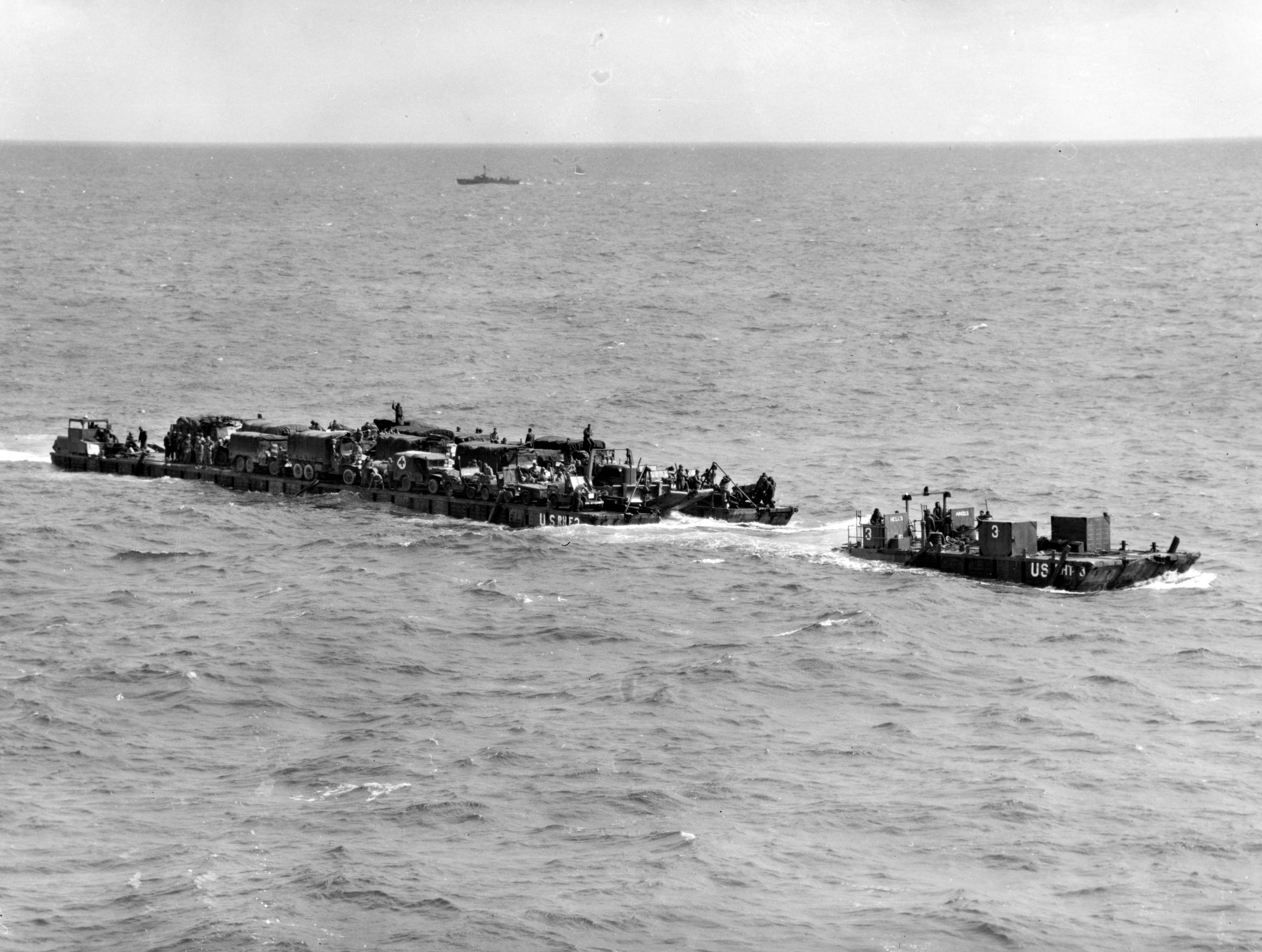
A US Navy rhino ferry (left) approaches the Normandy beaches, towed by a rhino tug (right).

The detailed shipping plan soon fell apart. Very little cargo was landed on the first day, putting Overlord behind schedule from the start. By midnight on 8 June, only 6,614 measurement tons (7,492 m^{3}) of the planned 24,850 long tons (25,250 t) had been discharged, just 26.6 percent of the planned total. This rose to 28,100 long tons (28,600 t) of the planned 60,250 long tons (61,220 t), or 46 percent of the planned total by midnight on 10 June. Emergency beach dumps were established by the engineer special brigades on 7 and 8 June, and the planned inland dumps were opened over the next few days. The dumps were under sniper fire, and on 10 June artillery ammunition was taken from its boxes and carried by hand to the batteries. A consolidated ammunition dump was established at Formigny on 12 June, and the First Army immediately took charge of it. The following day it assumed control of all dumps from the engineer special brigades.

The standard cargo vessel, the Liberty ship, carried up to 11,000 long tons (11,000 t) of cargo. It had five hatches; two had 50-long-ton (51 t) booms, and three with smaller 6-to-9-long-ton (6.1 to 9.1 t) booms. In their haste to unload the ships, the crews overloaded the booms, occasionally resulting in breakages. Cargo was not containerized, but transported in bulk in bags, boxes, crates and barrels. Cargo nets were spread out on the deck, and cargo piled on them. They were then lifted over the side on the ship's boom, and deposited in a waiting craft.

One of the most useful unloading craft was the rhino ferry, a powered barge constructed from pontoons. The other mainstay of the unloading effort was the 2.5-measurement-ton (2.8 m^{3}) amphibious truck known as the DUKW (and pronounced "duck"). DUKWs were supposed to land on D-Day, but most were held offshore and arrived the following day. The Omaha and Utah beaches remained under artillery and sniper fire for several days, and as a result the naval officer in charge would not permit ships to anchor close to shore on the first two days. Some were as far as 12 to 15 miles (19 to 24 km) offshore. This increased turnaround time for the unloading craft, especially the DUKWs, which were slow in the water. In some cases, DUKWs ran out of fuel. When this happened, their pumps failed, and they sank.

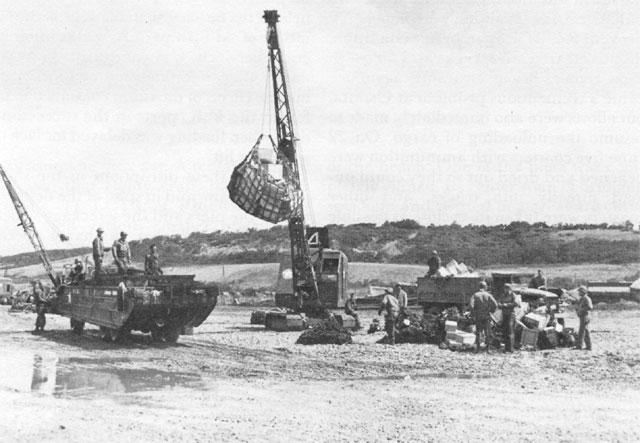
Crane transferring cargo from a DUKW

The unloading craft were frequently overloaded, increasing wear and tear, and occasionally causing them to capsize. Ideally, a DUKW reaching the shore would be met by a mobile crane that could transfer the load to a waiting truck that could take it to the dump, but there were shortages of both trucks and cranes in the early weeks. DUKWs therefore often had to take cargo to the dumps themselves. Insufficient personnel at the dumps for unloading further slowed turnaround, as did the practice of crews, whose priority was getting the ship unloaded, of unloading more than one category of supply at once, resulting in a trip to more than one dump. This was resolved only when the commodity loaded ships started to arrive on 15 June. Cargo was sometimes deposited on the beach at low tide, and if not swiftly cleared was likely to be swamped by the rising tide.

The movement of troops into the marshaling areas had been pre-scheduled, and was already under way when D-Day was postponed for 24 hours. Troops continued to pour into the marshaling areas even though embarkation had halted, and they became overcrowded. This was exacerbated by the slow turnaround of shipping. The stowage and loading plans could not be adhered to when the designated ships failed to arrive as scheduled, and troops and cargo in the marshaling areas could not be sorted into ship loads. The situation became so bad that the flow of troops to the ports became insufficient to load the available ships, and on 12 June Stevens diverted idle shipping to the British so it was not wasted. Thereafter, troops and cargo moved to the ports and were loaded on the next available ship or landing craft. Loading plans were worked out on the spot. If the Germans had sunk a ship it would have been highly embarrassing to the War Department, as no proper embarkation records were kept for a time, and it would not have been possible to notify the next of kin. Some units became lost in the confusion. Major General Leonard T. Gerow, the commander of V Corps, personally returned to the UK to locate a missing unit that the Southern Base Section had claimed had been shipped, but which was found still in its assembly area.

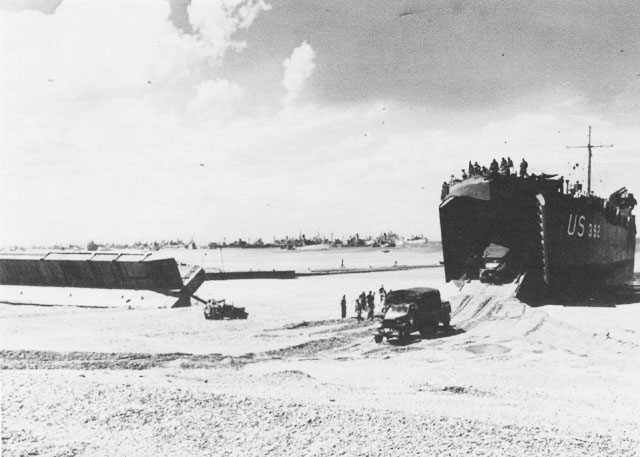
USS LST-332 discharges at Omaha Beach while dried out.

A major problem was ships arriving without manifests. These were supposed to have been shipped in advance by air or naval courier, but aircraft could not always get through, and the courier launches were often delayed. Navy and Transportation Corps officers went from one ship to the next searching for items that were desperately required. The First Army staff would then declare what they wanted discharged. Selective unloading left half-empty ships with supplies not immediately required standing offshore, further exacerbating the problem of ship turnaround. Desperate measures were taken. The most controversial was ordering the "drying out" of Landing Ships, Tank (LSTs). This involved beaching the LST on a falling tide, discharging at low tide, and then re-floating the LST on the rising tide. The procedure had been performed successfully in the Mediterranean and the Pacific, but with the high tidal range and uneven beaches of Normandy, naval officials feared that the LSTs might break their backs. Drying out commenced tentatively on 8 June and soon became a standard practice.

On 10 June, the First Army ordered the selective discharging of LSTs and Landing Craft, Tank (LCTs) to cease; this was extended to all vessels the following day. Discharge at night under lights began on 12 June despite the risk of German air attack. The backlog of ships was eventually cleared by 15 June. Nonetheless, the manifest problem persisted. When a critical shortage of 81 mm M1 mortar ammunition developed in July, all available ammunition was shipped from the UK, but the First Army did not know where the ammunition was or when it arrived. Ordnance personnel were forced to conduct searches of ships looking for it. Thus, a critical shortage continued even though 145,000 long tons (147,000 t) of ammunition lay offshore.

The first deep water port captured by the Allies was Cherbourg, which belatedly fell on 26 June. An advance party surveyed the port the following day. The Cherbourg Maritime station, the main railway station, was badly damaged, as were the two main quays.

=== Mulberry harbor ===
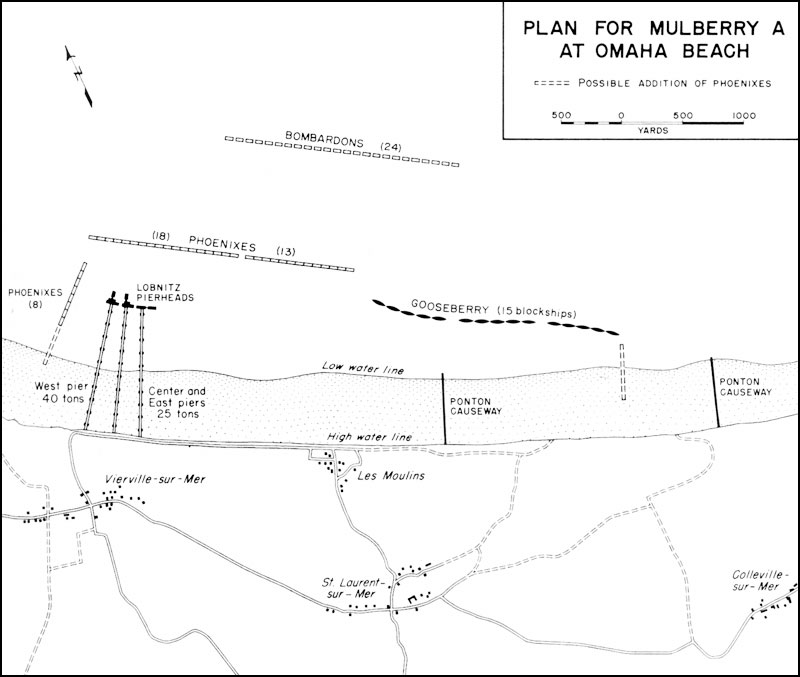
Plan of Mulberry A at Omaha Beach

The decision to land in Normandy meant that ports would not be captured quickly; the Brittany ports were not expected to be in operation until D plus 60. Until then, the Allied armies would have to rely on the beaches, but the weather forecast was not promising. Meteorological records showed that 25 days of good weather could be expected in June, but normally there were only two spells of good weather for four days running per month between May and September. The tidal range in Normandy was about 12 feet (3.7 m); low tide uncovered about one-quarter of a mile (0.4 km) of beach, and water deep enough for coasters, which drew 12 to 18 feet (3.7 to 5.5 m) of water, was another one-half a mile (0.8 km) further out.

The solution the COSSAC planners adopted was to build a prefabricated harbor. While ports like Dover and Cherbourg were artificial in the sense that their sheltered harbors had been created through the construction of breakwaters, there was a significant difference between building Dover in seven years in peacetime, and prefabricating an artificial port in a matter of months, and erecting it in two weeks in wartime. Originally, there was to be one artificial port, at Arromanches in the British sector, but by October 1943 COSSAC added a second one at Saint-Laurent in the American sector. At this time the project acquired a codename: Mulberry, with the American port becoming Mulberry A and the British one Mulberry B. British Rear Admiral Sir William Tennant was in charge of the operation, and the American Captain A. Dayton Clark in charge of Mulberry A.

The Mulberry harbor had three breakwaters. The outermost was made up of bombardons, 200-foot (61 m) long cruciform floating steel structures. These were laid out in a straight line. Then came the phoenixes, 60-by-60-by-200-foot (18 by 18 by 61 m) concrete caissons that weighed between 2,000 and 6,000 long tons (2,030 and 6,100 t). These were sunk in about 5 1/2 fathoms (10 m) of water to form an inner breakwater. Finally, there was the gooseberry, an inner breakwater formed by sinking obsolete vessels known as corncobs in about 2 1/2 fathoms (5 m) of water. Plans called for Mulberry A to have three piers, two of 25 long tons (25 t) capacity, and one of 40 long tons (41 t). Towing the mulberries' components was estimated to require 164 tugs, but only 125 were available, and 24 of these were temporarily diverted to tow barges. The target date for completion of the mulberries was therefore pushed back from D plus 14 to D plus 21. Along with old merchant ships, the corncobs included four old warships: the old battleship HMS Centurion, the French battleship Courbet, and the cruisers HMS Durban and HNLMS Sumatra.

Vehicles come ashore over one of the floating causeways.

Clark arrived off Omaha beach with his staff on 7 June, and the first three corncobs were scuttled under fire that day. The gooseberry was completed by 10 June, and by 17 June all 24 of the bombardons and 32 of the 51 phoenixes were in place, and the central LST pier was in use. On its first day of operation, a vehicle was unloaded over the pier every 1.16 minutes. Seabees (naval construction personnel) completed the first of the 2,450-foot (750 m) ponton causeways on 10 June, and the second five days later. The planned harbor installation at Utah Beach was much smaller, consisting of just two ponton causeways and a gooseberry with ten corncobs. The corncobs began arriving on 8 June, and came under fire from German artillery. Two were hit, and sank, but in approximately the intended position, albeit spaced too far apart. A third also sank slightly out of position when the tug towing it cut it loose to avoid the shelling. The remainder were scuttled in the correct locations, and the gooseberry was completed on 13 June. The first ponton causeway was opened that day, followed by the second three days later.

By 18 June, 116,065 long tons (117,927 t) of supplies had been landed, 72.9 percent of the planned 159,530 long tons (162,090 t), although only 40,541 (66 percent) of the planned 61,367 vehicles had arrived. The First Army estimated that it had accumulated nine days' reserves of rations, and five days' of POL. On the other hand, 314,504 (88 percent) of the planned 358,139 American troops had reached the beaches, representing eleven of the intended twelve divisions. In addition, 14,500 casualties had been evacuated by sea and 1,300 by air, and 10,000 prisoners had been shipped back to the UK.

On 19 June, the Normandy beaches were hit by a storm that lasted for four days. Although the worst June storm in forty years, it was not a severe one; waves reached 8 1/2 feet (2.6 m), with wind gusts up to 25 to 32 knots (46 to 59 km/h), and therefore never reached gale force. Nonetheless, the damage was considerable. Nearly a hundred landing craft were lost, and only one of the twenty rhino ferries remained operational. Damaged craft were strewn over the beach, partially blocking every exit. The storm interrupted unloading for four days, resulting in the discharge of only 12,253 long tons (12,450 t) of stores instead of the planned 64,100 long tons (65,100 t), and 23,460 troops instead of the 77,081 scheduled.

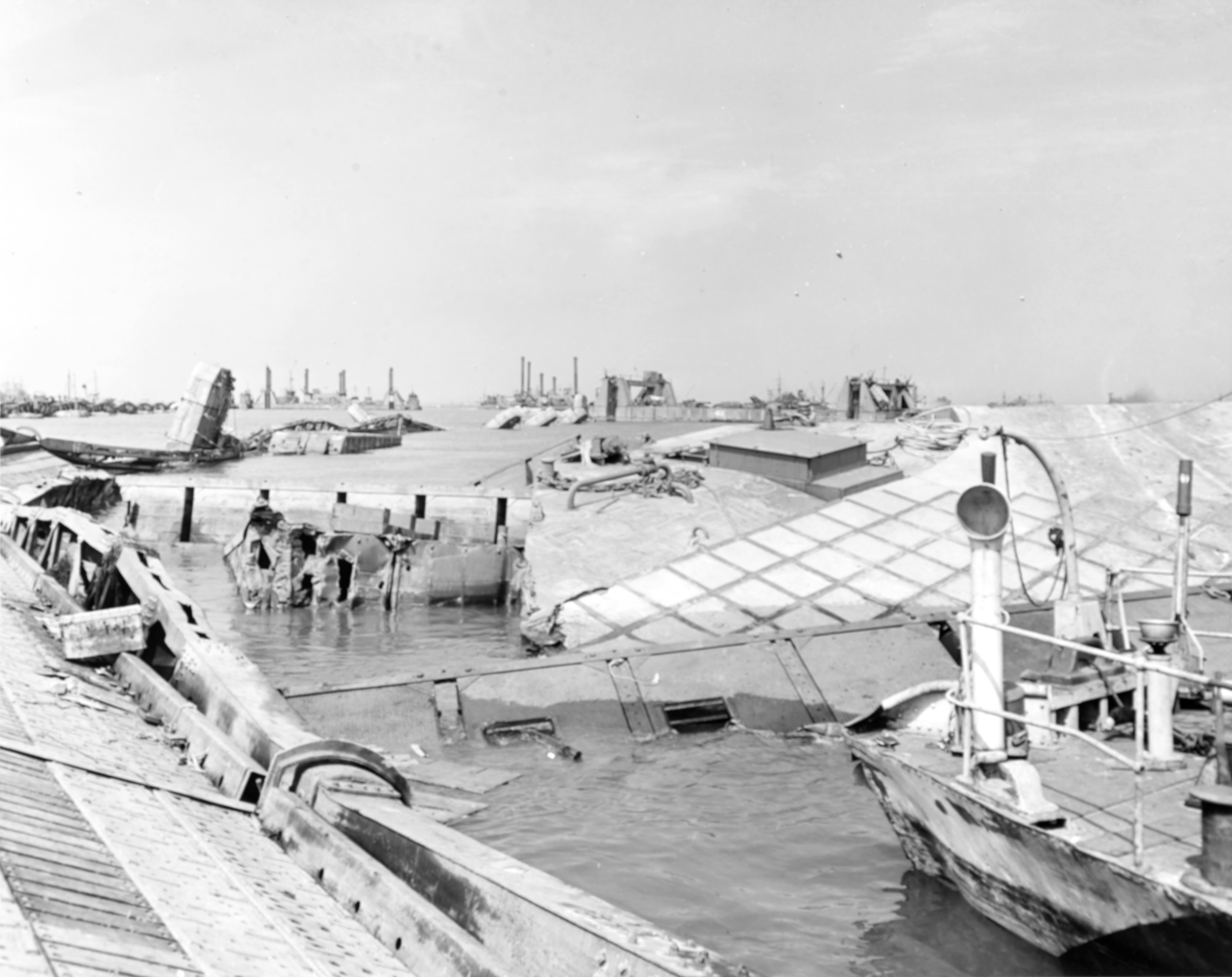
Wrecked ponton causeway after the storm

The American Western Naval Task Force commander, Rear Admiral Alan G. Kirk, surveyed the damage. The bombardons had failed completely, while the piers and phoenixes had been unable to withstand the pounding of the waves, and had been heavily damaged. Kirk decided that Mulberry A was a total loss, and should not be rebuilt, although the gooseberry should be reinforced with a dozen more blockships. Many American officials had been skeptical about the value of the artificial port concept from the beginning, but held their tongues, knowing that it had high-level official support. The British Mulberry B had not been as badly damaged, as the Calvados Rocks had given it some further protection, and the British still were determined to complete their artificial port to a standard that could withstand the autumn gales. The prime minister of the United Kingdom, Winston Churchill, assured Eisenhower that the project still had his full support. Mulberry B was repaired and reinforced, in some cases using components salvaged from Mulberry A. Expected to handle 6,000 long tons (6,100 t) per day, Mulberry B actually averaged 6,765 long tons (6,874 t) per day over three months, accounting for 48 percent of the tonnage unloaded in the British sector.

This left the American forces dependent on some small ports and unloading over the beaches. By 30 June, 70,910 of the planned 109,921 vehicles (64.5 percent) had been landed, and 452,460 (78 percent) of the planned 578,971 troops. The deficit in personnel consisted mainly of service and support troops; only eleven divisions had arrived instead of twelve, but the two airborne divisions which were to have been withdrawn to the UK had been retained in France.

=== Air supply ===
Air supply was handled by the Allied Expeditionary Air Force (AEAF). The Combined Air Transport Operations Room (CATOR) was established as a special staff section of AEAF Headquarters in Stanmore, and it took bids for air transport on a priority basis. The first major use of air supply was in support of the 82nd and 101st Airborne Divisions on 7 June, when 208 aircraft were despatched. Of these, 64 had to return to the UK without dropping their loads owing to bad weather. Of the 250 short tons (230 t) of supplies despatched 155 short tons (141 t) were dropped, of which 90 percent was recovered. In the following week, supplies were airdropped to the 101st Airborne Division on request. A misreading of ground panels by reconnaissance aircraft led to the delivery of 118 planeloads of cargo that were not required. Some supplies and equipment such as 105 mm howitzers were delivered by glider. Emergency airdrops were made to a field hospital on 8 June, and to an anti-aircraft unit isolated by the 19 June storm.

Only one administrative airfield was available by the end of July, at Colleville-sur-Mer near Omaha Beach. Nonetheless, cross-Channel air flights commenced on 10 June. Air supply was heavily used during the week after the storm, with 1,400 long tons (1,400 t) of supplies, mostly ammunition, landed. By the end of July, 7,000 long tons (7,100 t) had been delivered by air. In addition, 25,959 casualties were evacuated by air in June and July, compared to 39,118 by sea.

=== Ordnance ===
The nature of the fighting in the Normandy bocage country created shortages of certain items. A heavy reliance on M1 mortars not only led to a shortage of ammunition, but a shortage of the mortars themselves as the Germans targeted them. On 3 July, the First Army ordered tank, armored field artillery, and tank destroyer battalions to turn in their mortars for reallocation to infantry units. A shortage of bazookas was similarly addressed by taking them from service units and redistributing them to the infantry. The Germans made a special effort to eliminate men carrying the Browning automatic rifle (BAR), and 835 BARs were lost in June. Since each infantry regiment had 81 BARS, that was enough to equip ten. Another item with a higher than expected loss rate was the M7 grenade launcher. When this device was attached to the M1 Garand rifle, it disabled the rifle's semi-automatic function, so the rifle could not be fired normally when it was in place. Accordingly, they were quickly discarded after use in combat, resulting in a high loss rate. By mid-July, the First Army reported a shortage of 2,300 M7 grenade launchers.

Although ammunition expenditure did not exceed expected usage, it did not arrive at the planned rate either, resulting in shortages. The First Army gave high priority to the unloading of ammunition. The hedgerow fighting soon generated shortages of small arms ammunition and hand grenades. These were alleviated in the short term by emergency shipments by air, and in the medium term by allotting ammunition the highest priority for shipment instead of POL. On 15 June the First Army imposed restrictions on artillery ammunition, limiting the number of rounds per gun per day that could be fired. In part this was because deliveries consistently fell short of targets, but the main problem that the First Army sought to address was excessive and unreported stocks held by artillery units, which reduced the reserves held at Army level. The 19 June storm prompted emergency action. The First Army limited expenditure to a third of a unit of fire per day, arranged for 500 long tons (510 t) per day to be delivered by air for three days, ordered coasters carrying ammunition to be beached, and called forward five Liberty ships in UK waters that had been prestowed with ammunition.

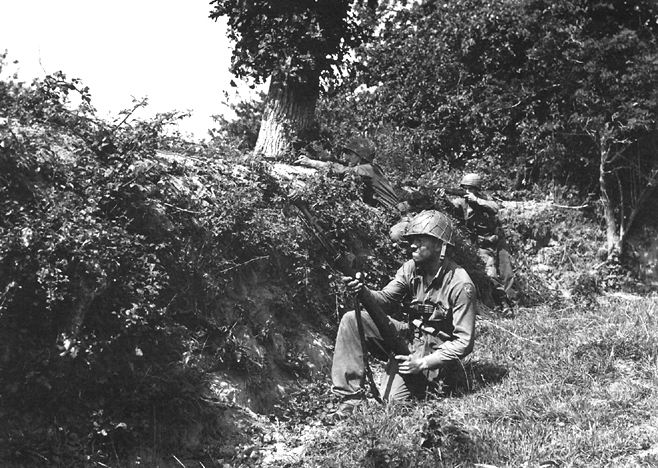
American soldiers near a hedgerow. The one in the foreground has an M7 grenade launcher.

A unit of fire was a somewhat arbitrary measurement for accounting purposes, and was different for each type of ammunition. It was 133 rounds for the 105 mm howitzer, 75 rounds for the 155 mm howitzer, 50 rounds for the 155 mm gun, and 50 rounds for the 8 inch howitzer. The divisions responded to the restrictions on the use of field artillery by employing tank destroyers and anti-aircraft guns as field artillery, as their ammunition was not rationed. On 2 July, the First Army imposed a new set of restrictions: expenditure was not to exceed one unit of fire of the first day of an attack, half a unit of fire on the second and subsequent days of an attack, and a third of a unit of fire on other days. Consumption in excess of the limits had to be reported to the First Army, with an appropriate justification. In practice, ammunition usage continued to be heavy, exacerbated by wasteful practices like unobserved firing and firing for morale effect by inexperienced units. By 16 July, the First Army stocks of 105 mm ammunition were down to 3.5 units of fire, and 81 mm mortar ammunition was at a critically low 0.3 units of fire. Ammunition was being unloaded at a rate of 500 long tons (510 t) per day, which was insufficient, resulting in the First Army stocks being depleted at a rate of 0.2 units of fire per day. The First Army once again imposed strict rationing on 16 July, but expenditure was well below the limits owing to most of the tubes going silent as they moved into new gun positions for Operation Cobra, the attempt to break out from Normandy.

The limitations of the M4 Sherman tank's 75 mm gun had already been recognized to some extent, and the theater had received 150 Shermans armed with the high-velocity 76 mm gun. A few weeks of combat in Normandy laid plain that the Sherman, even when equipped with the 76 mm gun, was outclassed by the German Tiger I, Tiger II and Panther tanks. The chief of the ETOUSA Armored Fighting Vehicles and Weapons Section, Brigadier General Joseph A. Holly, met with commanders in the field on 25 June, and then went to the United States in July to urge the expedited delivery of Shermans armed with the 105 mm howitzer, and of the new M36 tank destroyer, which was armed with a 90 mm gun. In the meantime, 57 recently received Shermans armed with the 105 mm howitzer were shipped to Normandy from the UK. Consideration was given to obtaining the British Sherman Firefly, which mounted the powerful 17-pounder anti-tank gun, but the British were overwhelmed with orders for them from the British Army. American propaganda declared that the American fighting man was the best equipped in the world, and when confronted with evidence to the contrary, there was widespread disillusionment, disappointment and disenchantment.

=== Subsistence ===
American soldiers were also skeptical of the claim that they were the best-fed soldiers of all time. The US Army's standard garrison ration was called the A-ration. The B-ration was the A-ration without its perishable components. The C-ration consisted of six 12-US-fluid-ounce (350 ml) cans – three of which contained meat combinations (meat and vegetable hash, meat and beans, or meat and vegetable stew), and the other three biscuits – hard candy, cigarettes, and a beverage in the form of instant coffee, lemon powder or cocoa.

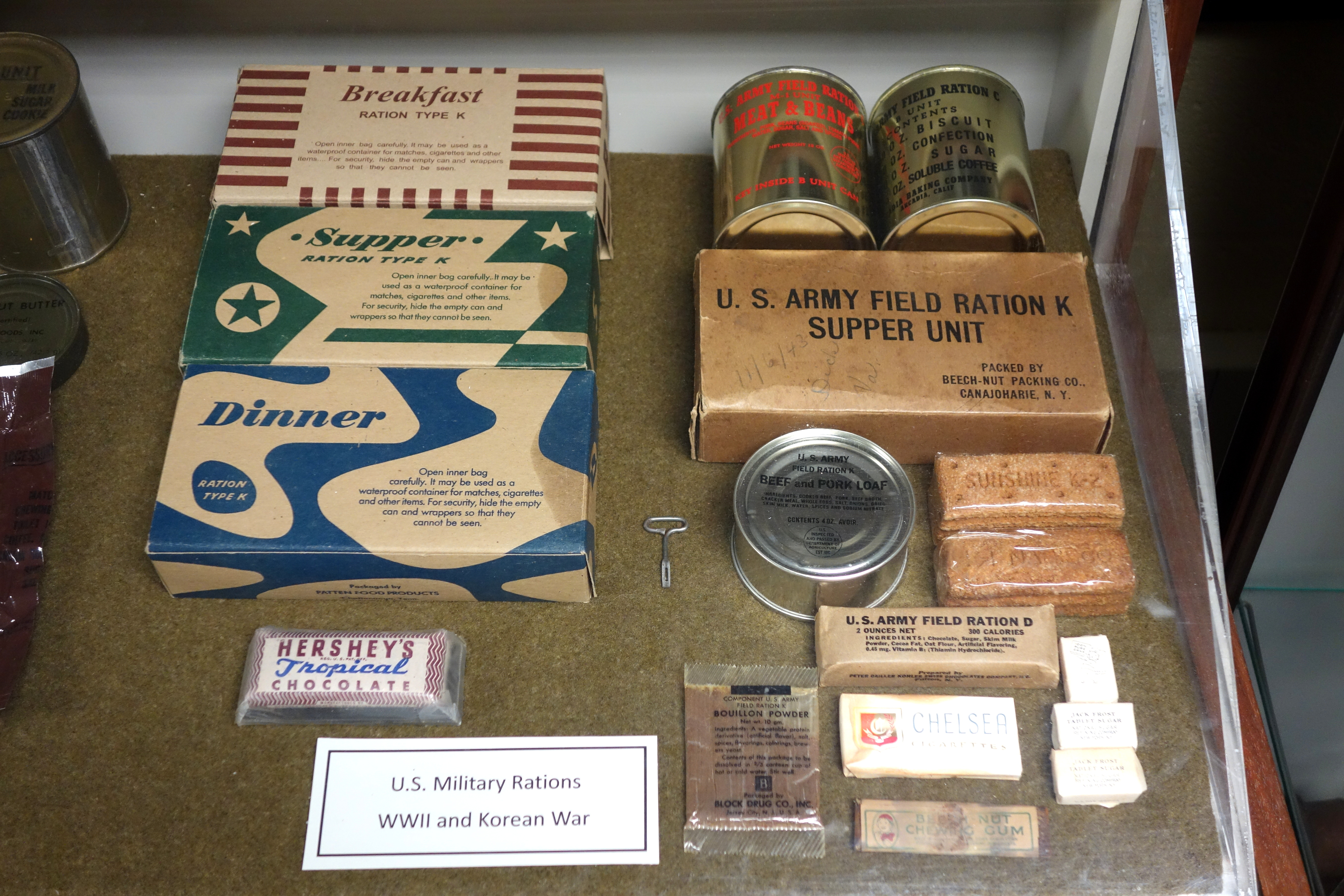
C, D and K rations

The better-packaged K-ration was designed to be an emergency ration. It contained three meals: a breakfast unit with canned ham and eggs and a dried fruit bar; a supper unit with luncheon meat; and a dinner unit with biscuits and cheese. It also contained Halazone water purification tablets, a four-pack of cigarettes, chewing gum, instant coffee, and sugar. The D-ration was a chocolate bar. The compactness of the K-ration made it the preferred choice of the foot soldiers, but troops with access to transport and heating preferred the C-ration. Finally, there was the 10-in-1, an American version of the British 12-in-1, which was intended to feed ten men. It could be used by field kitchens, and offered the variety of five different menus. The lemon powder in the C- and K-rations was their primary sources of vitamin C, but it was particularly unpopular with the troops, who frequently discarded it, or used it for tasks like scrubbing floors. This resulted in cases of scurvy among troops subsisting on C- and K-rations. There were also cases of riboflavin and thiamine deficiency due to deficiencies in the B-ration, which were largely corrected by October 1944 through the addition of fresh produce and enriched flour.

The troops landing on D-Day each carried one D-ration and one K-ration; another three rations per man in the form of C- and K-rations were carried with their units. For the first few days all rations landed were C- or K-rations. During the four weeks of Overlord, 60,000,000 rations were delivered to Normandy in vessels pre-stowed in three to eight 500-long-ton (510 t) blocks at the New York Port of Embarkation. This facilitated the shift to 10-in-1 packs over the less popular C- and K-rations; 77 percent of rations in the first four weeks were in the form of 10-in-1s. By 1 July, a static bakery was in operation at Cherbourg, and there were also seven mobile bakeries, permitting the issue of freshly baked white bread to commence. By mid-July, 70 percent of the troops were eating B-rations.

=== Petrol, oil and lubricants ===
Initially fuel arrived packaged in 5-US-gallon (20 L) jerricans. This was a German invention copied by the British; in the US Army it supplanted the 10-US-gallon (38 L) drum. The jerrican had convenient carrying handles, stacked easily and did not shift or roll in storage, and floated in water when filled with MT80 (80 Octane gasoline). The British version was an exact copy of the German model; the American version, called an Ameri-can by the British, was slightly smaller, with a screw cap onto which a nozzle could be fitted to deal with American vehicles with flush or countersunk fuel tank openings. If a nozzle was not available, the original can with its short spout was much preferred. A US jerrican weighed 10 pounds (4.5 kg) empty, and 40 pounds (18 kg) when filled with MT80, so 56 filled cans weighed one long ton (1.0 t). For Overlord, 11,500,000 jerricans were provided. Of these, 10,500,000 were manufactured in the UK and supplied to the US Army under Reverse Lend-Lease, while the rest came from the US. Jeeps arrived at the beachhead with full tanks and two jerricans of fuel; weapons carriers and small trucks carried five; 2½-ton trucks carried ten; and DUKWs carried twenty.

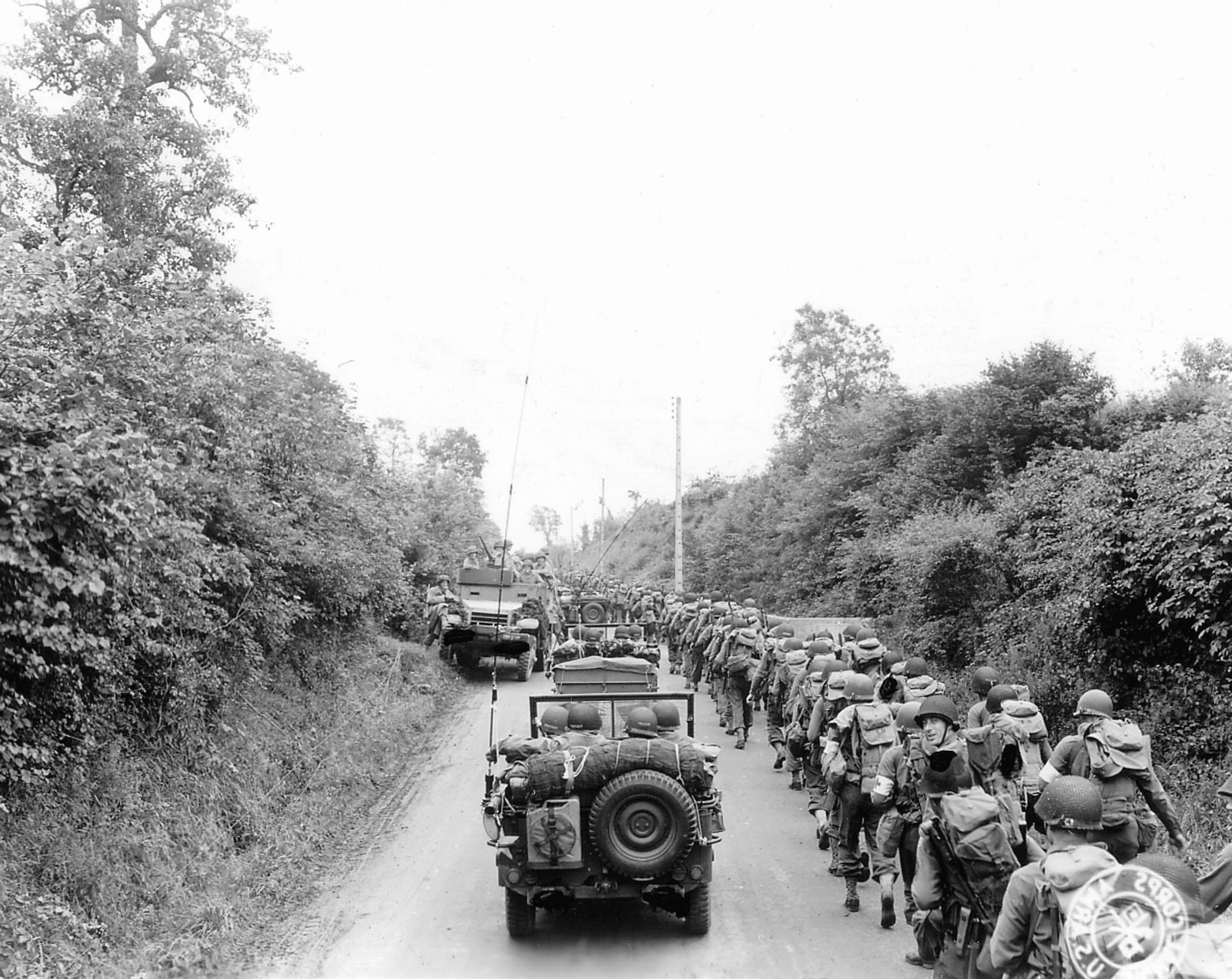
American soldiers and jeeps on their way to the front at Saint Lo in June 1944

The standard operating procedure (SOP) with respect to fuel containers was that empties should be returned and swapped for full ones, but the engineer special brigades had no refilling facilities, and did not wish to have the beach supply dumps cluttered with empties, so the First Army issued an order that empties not be returned. Instead, they went to divisional or corps collection points. The relaxation of the full-for-empty SOP was to have undesirable effects later on in the campaign. Bulk POL started to arrive at Isigny on 22 June, and at Port-en-Bessin and Sainte-Honorine-des-Pertes the following day. It had been expected that only the east mole at the Port-en-Bessin terminal could be used, and only by small tankers with a capacity of up to 150 long tons (150 t), but it was found that both the east and west moles could be used, and by tankers up to 1,500 long tons (1,500 t). This allowed one mole to be allocated to the British and one to the Americans.

The POL supply situation was satisfactory throughout June and July, mainly because the rate of advance was much slower than anticipated, resulting in shorter supply lines and lower fuel consumption. The First Army's daily MT80 consumption in July was around 9,500 US barrels (1,130,000 L). Steady progress was made on construction of the Minor System pipeline, which ran from Port-en-Bessin and Sainte-Honorine-des-Pertes to Saint Lo, and the tank farm at Mont Cauvin received its first bulk MT80 on 25 June. The delay in the capture of Cherbourg led to the extension of the Minor System beyond what had originally been planned, and eventually 70 miles (110 km) of pipeline were laid instead of the planned 27 miles (43 km). The pipeline carried both MT80 and avgas (100 octane aviation gasoline) to Saint-Lô, and later to Carentan. Intended to deliver 6,000 US barrels (720,000 L) per day, it was delivering twice that by the end of July. Storage was similarly greater than planned, 142,000 US barrels (16,900,000 L) instead of the planned 54,000 US barrels (6,400,000 L). Decanting of bulk fuel into jerricans began on 26 June, and by July 600,000 US gallons (2,300,000 L; 500,000 imp gal) were being decanted each day.

By the time Operation Cobra was launched on 25 July, Overlord was running nearly forty days behind schedule, and no part of the planned Major System pipeline was in operation. As it was expected to have received 85,000 long tons (86,000 t) of POL by then, receipts lagged considerably. Nonetheless, stocks were roughly what had been intended, because consumption had been much lower. In June, the First Army consumed around 3,700,000 US gallons (14,000,000 L), an average of about 148,000 US gallons (560,000 L) per day, or 55 long tons (56 t) per division slice (this being the number of soldiers divided by the number of divisions – about 35,000 in the ETO). This rose to 11,500,000 US gallons (44,000,000 L), an average of about 372,000 US gallons (1,410,000 L) per day, or 75 long tons (76 t) per division slice in July, but still remained far below the expected figure of 121 long tons (123 t) per division slice.

== Outcome ==
The biggest defect in the Overlord logistical plan was the failure to anticipate the nature of the fighting in the bocage country. This resulted in larger than anticipated expenditure and shortages of certain items, particularly artillery and mortar ammunition, and calls for the introduction of new model tanks and the upgrading of existing ones. The plan called not just for the maintenance of the divisions ashore, which required about 800 long tons (810 t) per division slice daily, but also for building up 21 days' reserves of most classes of supplies by D plus 41, which required the landing of half as much again. When supplies for the air forces, civil affairs and overheads such as materials for the repair of roads, rehabilitation of ports and construction of pipelines were taken into account, some 26,500 long tons (26,900 t) had to be landed each day.

When the Normandy campaign officially ended on 24 July, the lodgment area covered about 1,570 square miles (4,100 km^{2}), about a tenth of what was anticipated, but troops continued to arrive at a rate only slightly less than scheduled. The delay in the capture of Cherbourg meant that the build up of stockpiles had proceeded slower than expected, only about 62 percent of the intended volume of supplies being landed. This was offset by the congestion of the lodgment area. Every field seemed to be taken over by a dump or depot or service or combat unit. Covered storage was unavailable except at Cherbourg and Montebourg, so supplies were stacked in open fields, where they were exposed to the elements. The congestion was of particular concern for the storage of ammunition, which had to be dispersed; an explosion and fire at the large ammunition depot in Formigny destroyed 2,000 long tons (2,000 t) of the 50,000 long tons (51,000 t) of ammunition stored there. Plans to move supplies by rail were disrupted by the late capture of Cherbourg, and the first train did not depart from there until 11 July. In the meantime, supplies were moved by road, and some intersections saw a thousand vehicles passing through each hour. This heavy vehicle traffic soon took its toll of the road network.

Although the supply system was functioning satisfactorily on the eve of the launch of Operation Cobra on 25 July, the outlook was uncertain. It was apparent that the Brittany ports would not be taken on schedule. Brigadier General Royal B. Lord, the chief of staff of COMZ, informed Major General Leroy Lutes, his counterpart at ASF, that he expected that Cherbourg would eventually be able to handle 20,000 long tons (20,000 t) a day, but others regarded this forecast as optimistic, and even with Quiberon Bay in operation, there might not be enough port capacity to maintain the planned troop numbers until D plus 180.

== See also ==
- American logistics in the Northern France campaign
- British logistics in the Normandy campaign
