= Levavasseur =

Levavasseur is a French surname. It may refer to:

- Charles-Jean LeVavasseur (1892-?), pentathlon competitor in the 1924 and 1928 Summer Olympics
- Christian Levavasseur (born 1956), cyclist
- Katiana Levavasseur (born 1970), French politician
- Ingrid Levavasseur, spokesperson for the 2019 Yellow Vest Movement in France
- Léon Levavasseur (1863–1922), inventor and aviation engineer
- Léon René Levavasseur (1860-1942), artillery officer and creator of the Levavasseur project, an early tank concept
- René Levavasseur, architect who designed the Gare Maritime de Cherbourg railway building
