= Operation Hands Up =

Planned Allied operation in WW2

Operation Hands Up was an Allied plan in World War II to seize the Quiberon Bay area in southern Brittany. Two purposes have been suggested for the operation. Firstly, as a part of Operation Chastity, to enable the area to be developed as a deep-water port for supplying allied armies, supplementing the routes through Normandy, following the anticipated break-out from Normandy. Secondly, as an entry point for further armies shipped directly from the United States to support the break-out and possibly out-flank the German 7th Army.

The seizure involved the 1st Airborne Division landing on Belle-Isle to neutralise German gun emplacements.

In the event, Chastity and Hands Up were not executed. Again, there are differing reasons for this. The failure to neutralise the German bases at Brest and elsewhere was felt to expose shipping to risk. The unexpectedly rapid break-out and advance through northern France moved the U.S. Army's focus from Brittany and the Channel ports were seen as principal supply routes. In addition, the experience of the "Great Storm" of 19–22 June that severely damaged temporary allied harbour installations off Normandy raised the perception of similar risks at Quiberon Bay.
