= Royal B. Lord =

United States Army general (1899–1963)

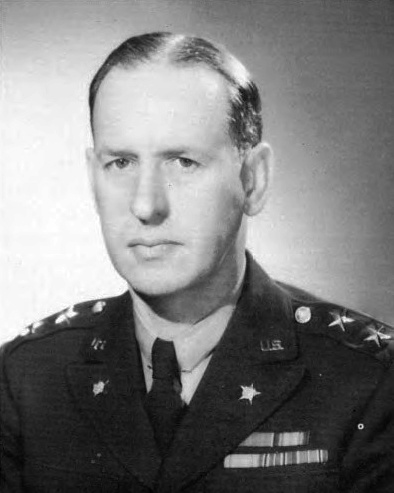
- Born: 19 September 1899; Worcester, Massachusetts, US
- Died: 21 October 1963 (aged 64); Rancho Santa Fe, California, US
- Burial place: Chapel of the Chimes (Hayward, California)
- Military career
- Allegiance: United States
- Branch: United States Army
- Service years: 1923–1946
- Rank: Major General
- Service number: O-15119
- Conflicts: World War II
- Awards: Distinguished Service Medal; Legion of Merit (2); Bronze Star Medal (2); Knight Commander of the Order of the Bath (UK); Croix de Guerre with palm (France); Commander of the Legion of Honor (France)

Royal Bertrand Lord (19 September 1899 – 21 October 1963) was a United States Army general who served in World War II.

A graduate of the United States Military Academy at West Point, New York, ranked 4th in the class of 1923, Lord served as an instructor in tactics at West Point, and on construction projects including flood control on the Mississippi River and the Passamaquoddy Bay tidal power project in Maine. From 1936 to 1938 he was the head of the construction division of the Resettlement Administration and then the Farm Security Administration. During World War II he was the chief of staff of the Communications Zone in the European Theater of Operations, United States Army. He retired in 1946.

== Early life ==
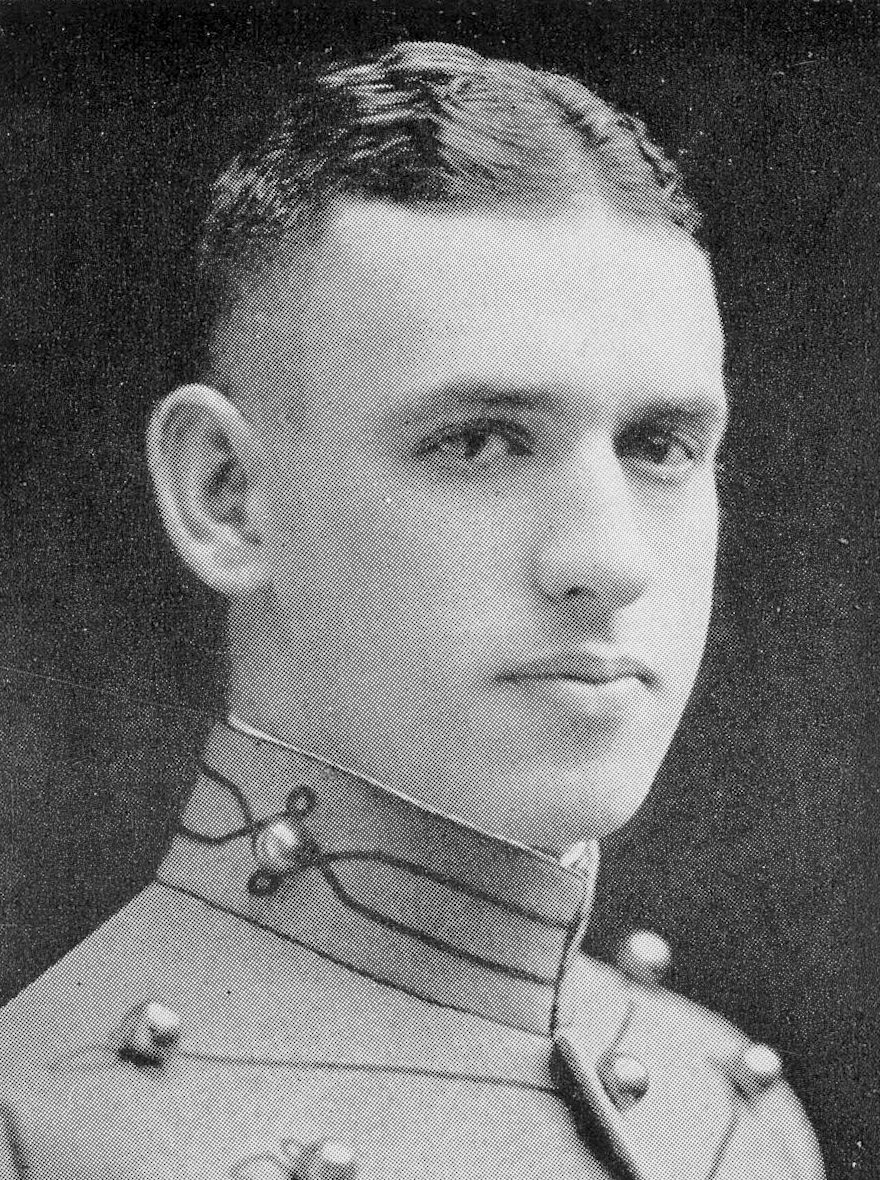
At West Point in 1923

Royal Bertrand Lord was born in Worcester, Massachusetts, on 19 September 1899, the son of Edgar Harold Lord and his wife Lena Rita née Lupien. He entered Brown University, from which he graduated in 1919 with a Bachelor of Science degree.

He entered the United States Military Academy at West Point, New York, as an appointment from Rhode Island on 13 June 1919, and graduated on 12 June 1923, ranked fourth in his class.

== Between the wars ==
As was usual for high-ranking graduates, Lord was commissioned as a second lieutenant in the Corps of Engineers. He completed his engineer training at the Engineer School at Fort Humphreys, Virginia, and was stationed at Fort William McKinley in the Philippines from 30 May 1924 to 16 April 1926. He built barrios to house families, and erected radio towers to link the islands together.

On 5 June 1926, Lord was posted to San Francisco, California, as Assistant District Engineer of the First District. On 15 August 1926, he entered the University of California, Berkeley, from which he graduated with a degree in civil engineering. It was there that he met Elizabeth Richardson, the daughter of a Berkeley attorney, whom he married. They had a son, Willard Richardson (Dick) Lord.

Lord then became an instructor in tactics at West Point, with the rank of first lieutenant from 15 November 1927. He built new sports fields including a polo field (Howze Field) and an ice hockey arena (Smith Rink). In 1931, he helped Grover Whalen organize the Army–Navy Game, which was held at Yankee Stadium that year for the benefit of the unemployed, at the behest of President Herbert Hoover. Lord collected money from businessmen for the event in Evangeline Booth's tambourine.

Lord commanded a company of the 6th Engineer Regiment at Fort Lawton, Washington, from 19 August 1931 to 3 October 1933, then went to St. Louis, Missouri, as assistant to the district engineer on 12 October 1933, where he worked on flood control projects on the Mississippi River. He served in the office of the Chief of Engineers in Washington, DC, and then in Eastport, Maine, where he worked on the Passamaquoddy Bay tidal power project. As part of this he built the temporary Quoddy Village that housed construction workers. He was promoted to the rank of captain on 1 August 1935. He returned to Washington, DC, on 26 July 1936, and became the head of the construction division of the Resettlement Administration and then its successor, the Farm Security Administration.

== World War II ==
On 7 November 1938, Lord assumed command of a battalion of the 3rd Engineer Regiment at the Schofield Barracks in the Territory of Hawaii. He built pillboxes and field fortifications, for which he was awarded several patents. He was promoted to major on 1 July 1940. From December 1940 to August 1941 he served as assistant director of the Bureau of Public Relations at the War Department in Washington, DC, and was promoted to lieutenant colonel in the wartime Army of the United States on 26 March 1941.

Lord did not enjoy this role, and was grateful when Vice President Henry A. Wallace, with whom he had worked at the Farm Security Administration when Wallace was Secretary of Agriculture, selected him to become Chief of Operations and assistant director of the Board of Economic Warfare. Lord served in this capacity from September 1941 to August 1942, and was advanced to the rank of colonel on 1 February 1942. This was followed by service on the War Requirement Board in the Office of the Chief of Engineers from September 1942 to January 1943.

In February 1943, Lord was transferred to the European Theater of Operations, United States Army (ETOUSA), where he served on the staff of Major General John C. H. Lee's Services of Supply (SOS). In a reorganisation of the staff in June 1943, Lord became the Chief of Services. As such, he was responsible for the supervision of all the supply services, along with the General Purchasing Agent and the Deputy Area Petroleum Officer. His office was organized into three echelons, with one at Norfolk House for planning in cooperation with Allied planning agencies; one at Cheltenham for the supervision of supply operations; and one at SOS headquarters in London which exercised over-all supervision.

Lord was junior to many of the officers serving under him, and had never attended the Army higher command schools, the Command and General Staff College, Army War College or Army Industrial College. Nor did he have much experience in logistics, the primary role of the SOS. Although he had the full confidence of Lee, he was resented by some members of the staff, and Major General Wilhelm D. Styer, the Chief of Staff of Army Service Forces (ASF), recommended to Lieutenant General Jacob L. Devers, the commander of ETOUSA, that a more senior officer be brought in. Accordingly, Lord was replaced by Major General Robert W. Crawford, who became both deputy commander of SOS and Chief of Services.

Lord temporarily became Deputy Chief of Services for Planning, but soon became the Chief of Operations, responsible for staff co-ordination of operations. This arrangement did not last due to a personality clash between Lee and Crawford, and in October Crawford was transferred to the headquarters of the Supreme Allied Commander (COSSAC). He was replaced by Lord, who became both Chief of Staff and Deputy Commander of SOS, and was promoted to brigadier general on 22 February 1944. He traveled to Washington, DC, in March 1944 to review the supply situation for Operation Overlord with the ASF. From February 1944 on, SOS was increasingly referred to as the Communications Zone (COMZ), although this did not become official until 7 June.

In August, COMZ Headquarters moved from the UK to a camp at Valognes in France. Although the theater commander, General Dwight D. Eisenhower had expressed a desire that headquarters not be located in Paris, Lord ordered COMZ to relocate to Paris on 1 September, without Lee's knowledge. This involved the movement of 8,000 officers and 21,000 enlisted men from the UK and Valognes, and took two weeks to accomplish. The move to Paris was justified on the grounds that Paris was the hub of France's road, rail and inland waterway communications networks, but the use of scarce fuel and transport resources at a critical time caused embarrassment.

Relations between Lee and Crawford were never good, so Lord personally handled most of the communication with Eisenhower's Supreme Headquarters Allied Expeditionary Force (SHAEF). He also dealt with most of the complaints coming from the field, and starting in January 1945, also submitted weekly reports to ASF. American logistics in the Northern France campaign suffered from supply shortages in the aftermath of the breakout from Normandy and the Allied advance from Paris to the Rhine, and resulted in clashes between Lord and Brigadier General Raymond G. Moses, the assistant chief of staff for logistics (G-4) of the 12th Army Group. Lord offered statistics to show that COMZ deliveries were exceeding the amounts requisitioned, but Moses argued that this was the result of the armies restricting their requisitions. They needed 650 long tons (660 t) of supplies per division slice, but were receiving only 550 long tons (560 t), and could not be comforted with statistics.

Lord was promoted to major general on 14 November 1944. In April 1945, he became commander of the ETOUSA Assembly Command, which had the key responsibility of coordinating the repatriation of personnel from Europe. He was succeeded as Chief of Staff and Deputy Commander of COMZ by Major General Thomas B. Larkin. He returned to the United States in December 1945. For his services, Lord was awarded the Distinguished Service Medal, the Legion of Merit with an oak leaf cluster, and the Bronze Star Medal with oak leaf cluster. He was created an honorary Knight Commander of the Order of the Bath by the UK and a Commander of the Legion of Honor by France, which also awarded him the Croix de Guerre with palm. He was also made an honorary citizen of Rheims, and in 1946 Brown University awarded him an honorary doctor of laws degree.

== Later life ==
On 30 April 1946 Lord retired at his substantive rank of major. In June 1948, a law was passed that allowed retired officers who had served on active duty at a higher temporary rank for six months or more to be advanced to that rank on the retired list, and he was promoted to major general.

Lord became the chairman of the board and president of the Worldwide Development Corporation in New York City, and supervised large-scale housing projects in Argentina, and built the La Quinta Country Club in California. He served as a director of US Finishing Company, the Triplex Corporation of America, Voss Oil, ExComm List Industries, Glen Alden and Aconic Mining. He wrote articles that were published in Collier's, Popular Science, the Engineering News Record and other magazines. He retired in 1960, and built his own home overlooking a golf course in Rancho Santa Fe, California. He died suddenly on 21 October 1963, and was interred in the Chapel of the Chimes, Alameda County, California.

== Dates of rank ==
Insignia	Rank	Component	Date	Reference
	Second lieutenant	Corps of Engineers	12 June 1923	
	First lieutenant	Corps of Engineers	15 November 1927	
	Captain	Corps of Engineers	1 August 1935	
	Major	Corps of Engineers	1 July 1940	
	Lieutenant colonel	Army of the United States	26 March 1941	
	Colonel	Army of the United States	1 February 1942	
	Brigadier general	Army of the United States	22 February 1944	
	Major general	Army of the United States	14 November 1944	
	Major	Retired List	30 April 1946	
	Major general	Retired List	1948	
