= Operation Chastity =

Unrealised WW2 Allied logistics plan

- Part of Operation Overlord on the Western Front during the Second World War
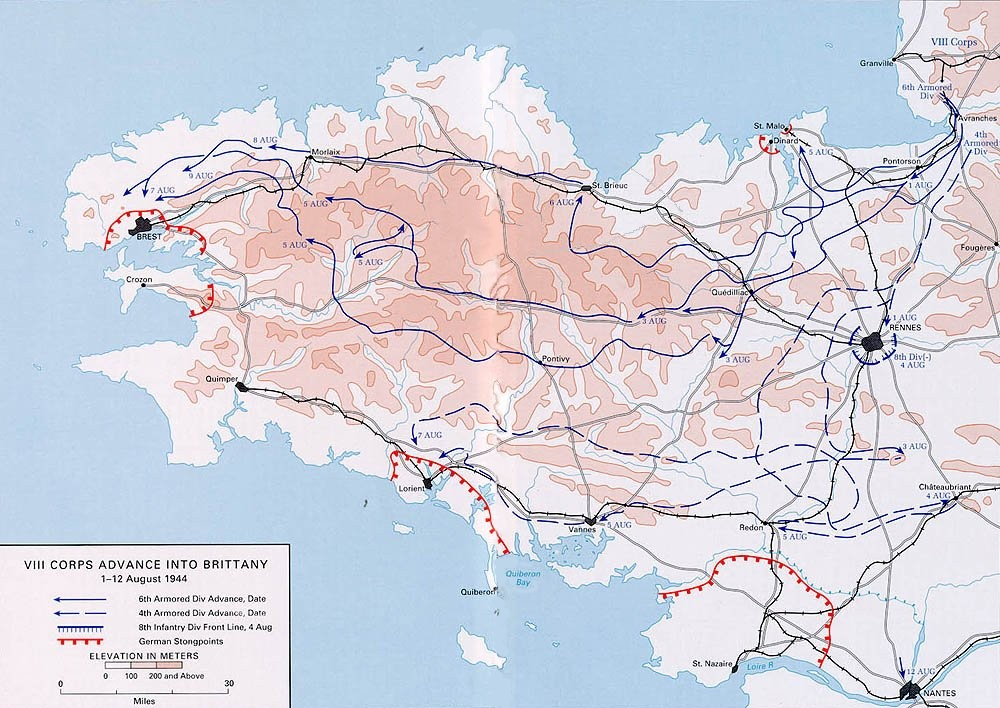
Date	3 August – 7 September 1944 (1 month and 4 days)
Location	Quiberon Bay, France 47°35′N 2°56′W
Result	See Debate
Territorial changes	Allies liberate Brittany with the exception of Brest, Lorient and Quiberon Peninsula.

Belligerents
United States	Germany

Commanders and leaders
Omar Bradley; George S. Patton; Troy H. Middleton; John Shirley Wood	Günther von Kluge; Paul Hausser; Wilhelm Fahrmbacher

Units involved
Twelfth United States Army Group; US Third Army; US VIII Corps; US 4th Armored Division	Army Group B; Seventh Army; XXV Army Corps

Operation Chastity was a World War II plan by the Allies to seize Quiberon Bay, France, enabling the construction of an artificial harbor to support Allied operations in Northern France in 1944.

The artificial harbor was not developed, as the US VIII Corps failed to capture German-held areas that threatened the port. By the end of August 1944, Allied forces had captured all of Brittany except for the critical areas, preventing the further development of the operation. Following the capture of Antwerp and its port facilities in early September 1944, Operation Chastity was officially cancelled on 7 September.

The non-completion and eventual cancellation of Operation Chastity exacerbated strains on the Allied logistical system, may have prevented an Allied victory over Germany in 1944, and has been described as "the critical error of World War II", although other historians believe that priority was rightly given to the pursuit of the fleeing German forces.

== Background ==
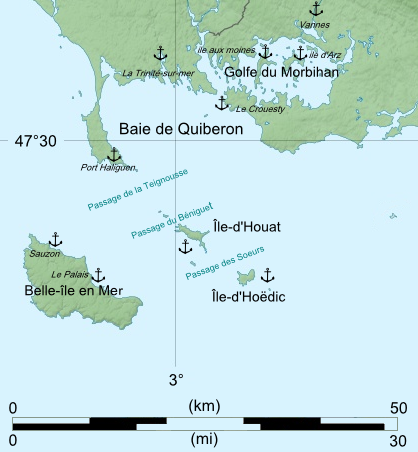
Map of Quiberon Bay

One of the primary concerns when the Allies were planning Operation Overlord was the acquisition of deep-water ports. This was because the vital factor in its success was logistics, particularly American logistics, as the Twelfth United States Army Group would be operating further from the English Channel coast than the British 21st Army Group.

The Overlord plan envisaged the Allies establishing a secure lodgement west of the Seine and north of the Loire. From this base, the Allies would advance to Paris and then Germany, once sufficient forces and supplies were available.

The Overlord plan assumed that in the first weeks after D-Day, the Allied forces would be supported over the invasion beaches, and through two Mulberry harbours that would be assembled - "A" at Omaha Beach and "B" at Gold Beach. However, in the longer term and in order to handle the large quantities of reinforcements and supplies needed for the campaign, quayside discharge of Liberty ships would be necessary.

Therefore, one of the first objectives of the Overlord plan was to seize the port of Cherbourg. After this foothold was secured, the most important single strategic objective would be the capture and development of major ports.

Seven ports in Normandy were expected to be captured and opened in the first four weeks after D-Day: Isigny-sur-Mer, Cherbourg, Grandcamp-Maisy, Saint-Vaast-sur-Seulles, Barfleur, Granville, Manche and Saint-Malo. Except for Cherbourg, all were small and tidal, making Cherbourg the only major port supplying the Allied force. However, even Cherbourg was planned to develop a capacity of no more than 8 or 9,000 tons per day, while the minor ports were intended only as a stopgap.

The inadequate port capacity in Normandy meant that the Brittany ports would have to play the key logistical role. In fact, the overall success of Operation Overlord was predicated on organizing Brittany as the principal supply base for US forces and the importance of Brittany in the Overlord plan "can hardly be exaggerated". Therefore, the Overlord plan called for Brittany to be isolated and its ports captured. Only after the ports were seized would operations towards Paris and Germany begin.

However, all the ports were expected to have facilities destroyed, harbors blocked and approaches mined by the Germans, requiring extensive repairs before they could be used efficiently. Therefore, the planners concluded that the logistical capacity of the captured French ports would not be adequate to support the Allied liberation of France, and a new port had to be built somewhere in Normandy or Brittany.

== Plan ==
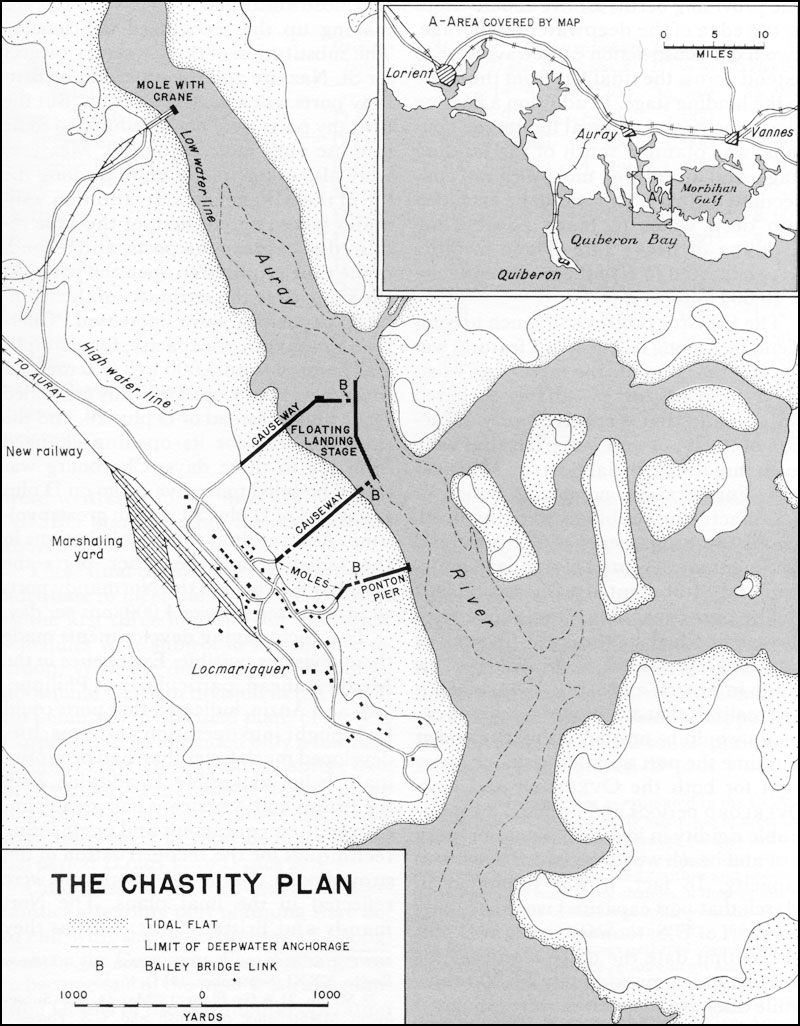
The Chastity plan

The solution to the Allies logistical problem was devised in April 1944 and given the name Operation Chastity. It involved constructing a brand-new, deep-water port at Quiberon Bay.

Quiberon Bay, a large estuary with four small ports, between Lorient and Saint-Nazaire on the southwest coast of Brittany, was sheltered by the Quiberon peninsula and a line of small islands, and the larger Belle Île. The Auray river had scoured a 3,000-yard (2,700 m)-long 80-foot (24 m)-deep pool between 30-yard (27 m) and 300-yard (270 m) wide with nearly vertical sides near the port of Locmariaquer.

Operation Chastity planned to construct floating piers in the pool, allowing large ships to tie up alongside, with causeways to carry cargo and troops to the shore. There would be room for offloading five ships simultaneously, providing a capability of 2,500 tons of supplies per day directly onto vehicles. A further 7,500 tons per day could be offloaded using lighters carrying supplies directly to the shore from thirty further ships moored in the pool.

The key advantage of Operation Chastity would be the ability to off-load Liberty ships sailing directly from the United States. A further advantage would be access to the relatively undamaged rail network outside the Normandy region, once a spur line and marshalling yard were constructed. The beaches of Quiberon Bay would also allow the unloading of LSTs at low tide.

Other attractive features of Operation Chastity were the sheltered anchorage in Quiberon Bay, that the port required only a fraction of the labor and materials committed to the Mulberry ports, and that it used standard components and available equipment.

However, the approaches to Quiberon Bay were covered by German coastal artillery at Lorient and on Belle Île and in the view of the planners, unless Brest, Lorient and Belle Île were captured, shipping cargo via Quiberon Bay would be, "impossible due to naval interference." Quiberon Bay was scheduled to be captured by D+40 with Brest and Lorient to fall by D+50. Planners thought that by D+60, British forces would be supported by the Mulberry ports, while American forces would be supported from Cherbourg, Saint-Malo, and Quiberon Bay.

== Approval of operation ==
The final plan envisaged the capture of Lorient, Brest, St. Malo and Quiberon Bay where the new port would be developed. Troops travelling direct from the United States were to disembark at Brest, and Quiberon Bay was to be developed into a major supply port. Between them, the four ports were expected to have a capacity of about 17,500 tons/day, with Quiberon Bay expected to land 10,000 tons/day.

Supreme Headquarters Allied Expeditionary Force (SHAEF) approved Operation Chastity on 22 April 1944. As it offered the greatest potential to solve the Allies' logistical problems, it was given highest priority, and US Third Army was given the objective of capturing Brittany. The addition of Operation Chastity was the final major revision to the invasion plan.

== Events ==
The Omaha Beach Mulberry was abandoned after it was damaged by a storm on 19–22 June, however this loss was mitigated as the amount of supplies landed directly over the beach was far in excess of expectations. Although Cherbourg was captured on 27 June, the port had been destroyed and required rebuilding, resulting in it receiving only a trickle of supplies by the end of July.

In early July, an alternative to capturing Brittany was proposed: moving eastward to surround and defeat German forces west of the Seine, with supplies coming from captured ports on the Seine. Although the planners could see the advantages of the scheme, they insisted that US logistics depended on the Brittany ports and the Seine ports could not replace them. Therefore, both General Eisenhower and General Montgomery continued to stress the necessity of capturing the Brittany ports, recognizing that without them Allied logistics would be inadequate.

The capture of the Quiberon Bay area was deemed important enough that consideration was given to a combined airborne and amphibious operation, Operation Hands Up to capture the area but, as the operation was deemed risky, it was agreed that it would only be attempted in the event that the advance into Brittany was delayed into September.

=== Advance to Quiberon Bay ===
By 1 August, after the success of Operation Cobra, Major General Troy H. Middleton's US VIII Corps of the US Third Army was advancing into Brittany and the US 4th Armored Division, led by Major General John S. Wood was thrusting south-westward from Pontaubault toward Rennes.

On 2 August, the 4th Armored Division was assembled north of Rennes. At this point, Wood proposed blocking the base of the Brittany peninsula at Angers rather than Quiberon, preparatory to moving his division eastward towards Chartres. After sending Middleton his proposal on the morning of 3 August, and anticipating no objection, Wood ordered his plan executed. That afternoon, Middleton instructed Wood to "Secure Rennes before you continue", implying consent for the alteration.

On 4 August, Middleton ordered the division to secure a line along the Vilaine River from Rennes to the coast, particularly the bridges at Redon and La Roche-Bernard, but with forces oriented eastward. This left the 4th Armored Division approximately ten miles away from Quiberon Bay, despite facing little opposition between there and its objective.

These dispositions were countermanded by Third Army's chief of staff, Major General Hugh J. Gaffey who ordered the 4th Armored Division to push "the bulk of the division to the west and southwest to the Quiberon area, including the towns of Vannes and Lorient in accordance with the Army plan."

The same day, Lieutenant General George S. Patton, commander of US Third Army, wrote in his diary, "Wood got bull headed and turned east after passing Rennes, and we had to turn him back on his objectives, which are Vannes and Lorient, but his overenthusiasm wasted a day."

Third Army's orders were complied with, and by 5 August US 4th Armored Division had reached the base of the Quiberon peninsula. Disorganized German forces were retreating into Lorient, Saint-Nazaire and up the Quiberon peninsula.

=== Failure to secure critical locations ===
By 9 August, the 4th Armored Division had captured Rennes and was probing Lorient's defenses, but reported that they were too strong to be quickly captured. However, the German commander, General der Artillerie Wilhelm Fahrmbacher, later stated that had the Americans attacked Lorient in force between 6 and 9 August, they would probably have succeeded.

The 4th Armored Division contained the German forces in Lorient and the Quiberon peninsula until 13 August, when it passed from the control of the VIII Corps, Patton turning it eastward without capturing its key objectives and without replacing the armor with infantry.

Meanwhile, the rest of VIII Corps, along with other Allied forces, had liberated much of the rest of Brittany, with the Battle of Saint-Malo ending with the city's defenders surrender on 2 September. The Battle for Brest started on 25 August. However, the other critical location, Belle Île, was not cleared by late August.

== Cancellation and aftermath ==
By the end of August, all of Brittany except for the fortified areas of Brest, Lorient, Saint-Nazaire and the Quiberon peninsula were cleared. However, none of Operation Chastity's prerequisite locations had been captured, and their defenses were fully operational. Therefore, development of Quiberon Bay could not commence.

On 3 September, SHAEF ordered a general pursuit of German forces towards Germany regardless of the lack of the required logistical capacity. The Allied armies advanced swiftly, but the available port capacity supporting the pursuit was only about half of what was required. On 4 September, the British seized Antwerp with its port facilities intact. On 7 September, SHAEF cancelled the Quiberon Bay plan, and two days later, Eisenhower determined that none of the Brittany ports were needed.

However, Antwerp was 55 miles (89 km) inland, up the Scheldt estuary, which was heavily mined, and the approaches were still in German hands. II Canadian Corps fought the Battle of the Scheldt from 2 October to 8 November, and the first Allied ships docked in Antwerp on 28 November. A lack of supplies during the September to November period limited the Allies' ability to exploit the German collapse, and by December, the Allied drive towards Germany had come to a standstill.

Brest's defenders surrendered on 18 September 1944, but the port facilities were totally destroyed and were not brought back into operation. Lorient was never captured, surrendering only after the end of the war in Europe.

== Debate on Operation Chastity ==
The wisdom of the decision to abandon Operation Chastity has been the subject of debate, but the preceding failure to seize Quiberon Bay has been overlooked by many historians.

=== Negative opinions ===
Those who regard Operation Chastity as a missed opportunity state that if the port on Quiberon Bay had been established, it would have given the 12th Army Group a high-capacity supply base with direct rail lines to the east, solving their logistical problems.

For example, Norman R. Denny of the U.S. Army Command and General Staff College stated that the logistics shortfalls that plagued the Allied campaign in Europe, due to the failure to implement Operation Chastity, "helped eliminate" the possibility of Germany surrendering in 1944. He further argued that the actions of Wood, Middleton, Patton, Lieutenant General Omar Bradley and Eisenhower made the advance into Brittany futile and endangered the Allied drive towards Germany. In particular, he argued that Wood's failure to capture the Quiberon peninsula was "tragic".

Similarly, Lieutenant Colonel Harold L. Mack, of the Communications Zone staff, described the failure to implement Operation Chastity as "the critical error of World War II". Mack places the blame for failing to capture Quiberon Bay primarily on Wood, who "had set his heart on participating in the main drive for Paris, where he could achieve fame and glory" and only half-heartedly carried out his orders, but accuses all Wood's superiors in the chain of command of failing to appreciate the "supreme need of taking Quiberon Bay".

Patrick S. Williams argues that SHAEF gambled that devoting the bulk of US Third Army to outflanking the German force in the Falaise pocket would mean a decisive victory over Germany could be attained before lack of logistics stopped the Allied advance, that a larger force should have been devoted to seizing the Brittany ports and that the decision to cancel Operation Chastity exacerbated the strain on an already fragile Allied logistical system. He states that the failure to implement Operation Chastity "may have prevented an Allied victory over Germany in 1944."

=== Positive opinions ===
Those who disagree that Operation Chastity was a missed opportunity believe that priority was rightly given to the encirclement and subsequent pursuit of the routing German forces. They further contend that lack of supplies was not the limiting logistical factor, transporting supplies to a front that was rapidly moving east was, and Operation Chastity would not have greatly improved the transport situation.

For example, historian Basil Liddell-Hart said, "American spearheads could have driven eastward unopposed. But the Allied High Command threw away the best chance of exploiting this great opportunity by sticking to the outdated pre-invasion programme, in which a westward move to capture Brittany ports was to be the next step." Historian Russell Weigley regarded the commitment to Brittany as wasteful of resources better spent supporting the drive to the east.

Martin van Creveld argues that although Patton and his subordinates "ignored plans" and "refused to be tied down by logisticians tables", their rapid eastwards advance threatened to cut off the German forces, causing them to rout out of France. He also suggests that the Allied planners were overly pessimistic about the consumption of supplies and the capabilities of the logistics system. Additionally, the Allies possessed more motor transport than any other army and were operating in summer, over a good road network, without enemy air interdiction and amongst a friendly population.

After the war, Wood stood by his attempt to turn his division east instead of taking Quiberon Bay and Lorient, stating, "We were forced to adhere to the original plan... It was one of the colossally stupid decisions of the war."

== See also ==
- Allied advance from Paris to the Rhine
- American logistics in the Normandy campaign
- Atlantic pockets – French, Belgian and Dutch ports fortified to deny their capacity to the Allies
- British logistics in the Normandy campaign
- Broad front versus narrow front controversy in World War II
- Operation Kinetic – Naval operation in support of the advance into Brittany
