= Cherbourg Maritime station =

Railway station in France

Coordinates: 49°38′45″N 1°37′03″W

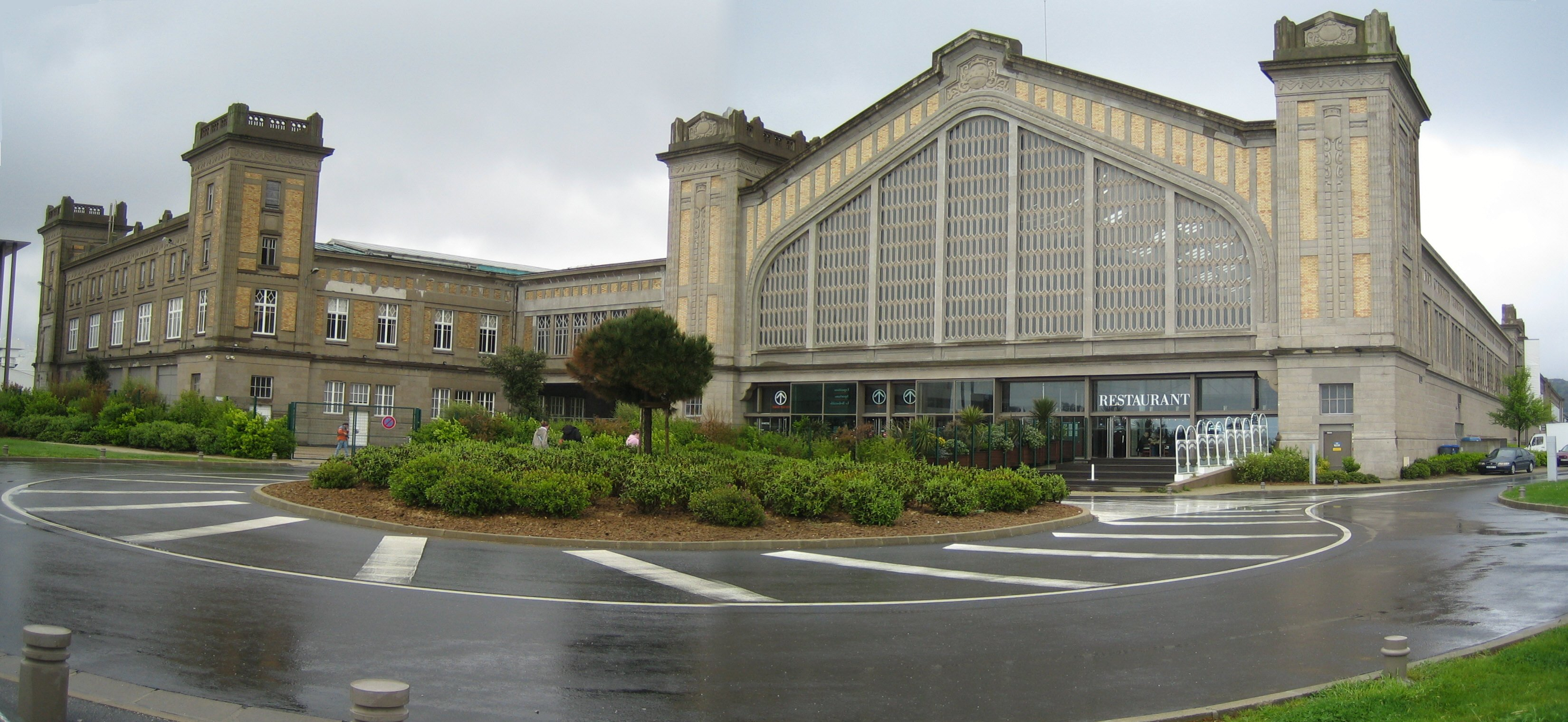
The harbour station, Cherbourg

Cherbourg's Gare Maritime or Gare Maritime Transatlantique was a railway station at the end of the railway line from Paris' Gare Saint-Lazare and of the short branch from Cherbourg's main station.

== Measurements ==
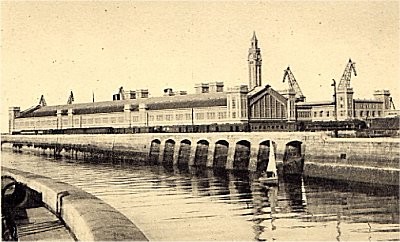
The station in 1933

The complex consisted of the transatlantic hall, a two-storey building through which passengers boarded ocean liners using nine footbridges, as well as with a plethora of amenities:

- Passenger concourse
- Post office
- Offices of each shipping company.

The hall is 240m long and constitutes the bulk of the complex, thirty four concrete arches carrying the copper and glass rooftop.

As the station is 93m wide, it was at the time of building the second largest construction in France after Palace of Versailles and covered 2 hectares. As well as the size of the construction mentioned, a 70m tall clock tower was built.

Along the hall was a 500m long covered gallery used for embarkment and dis-embarkment of passengers.

The station was divided in two parts and on the transatlantique side; two ships could berth and empty a thousand passengers into the station in an hour. On the Railway side, up to seven trains a day would take passengers to Paris in 3½ hours.

== History ==
The station building was designed by René Levavasseur. It was inaugurated on 30 July 1933 by Albert Lebrun, the President of the French Republic. Gare Maritime de Cherbourg saw intense activity during World War II, although it was partially destroyed in 1944. It was in heavy use during the 1950s and 1960s. The buildings were listed in December 1989 and constitute the last surviving example of 1930s maritime architecture in Cherbourg. The station closed in the 1990s.

=== Cité de la Mer ===
In 1996 an architectural competition was announced for design proposals to transform the building into a naval museum, after it ceased railway station operations. A project design, respecting the original building, was adopted in 1997. Work began in 1999. The Cité de la Mer museum was completed and opened in 2002.

=== Cruise terminal ===
In 2006, a Cherbourg cruise terminal was inaugurated in the harbour nearby.

== See also ==
- Cherbourg-Octeville topics
