= Division slice =

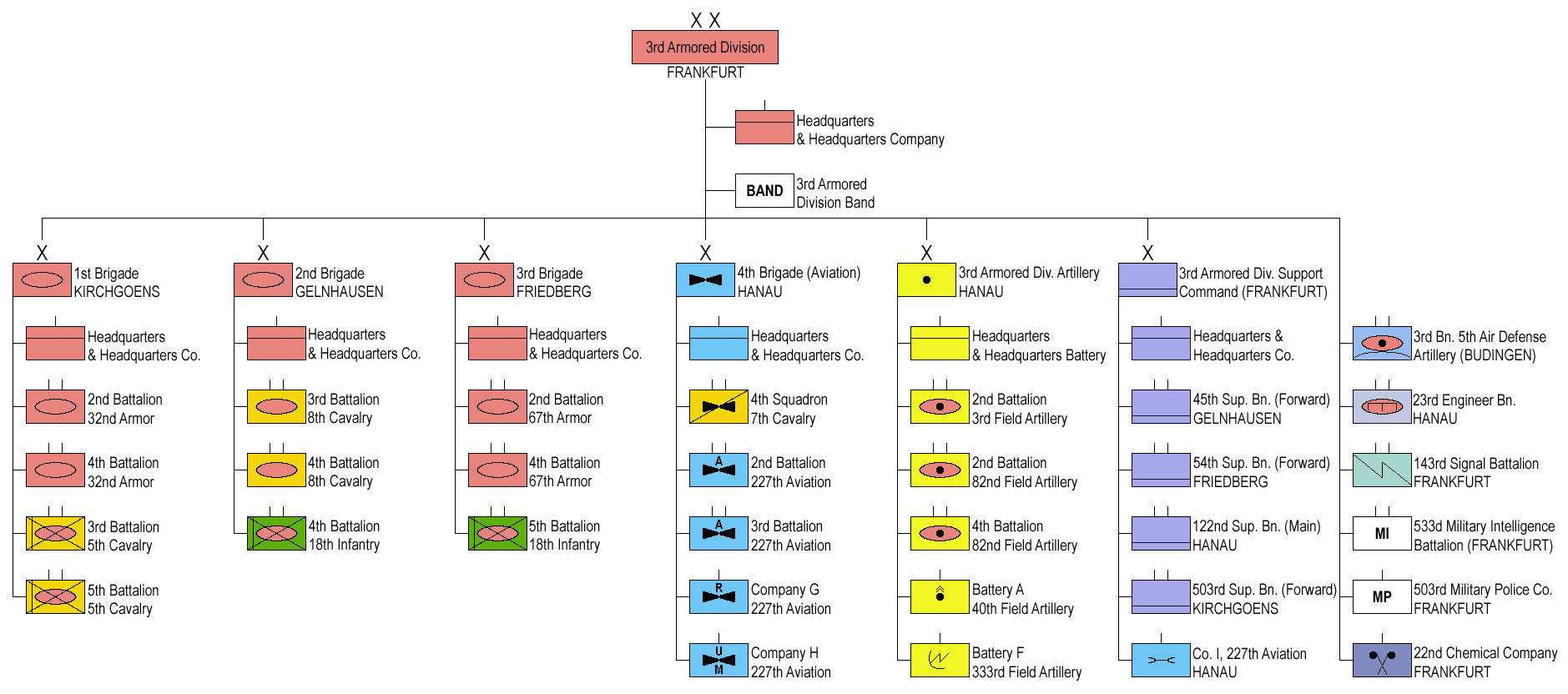
The structure of a 1989 US armoured division

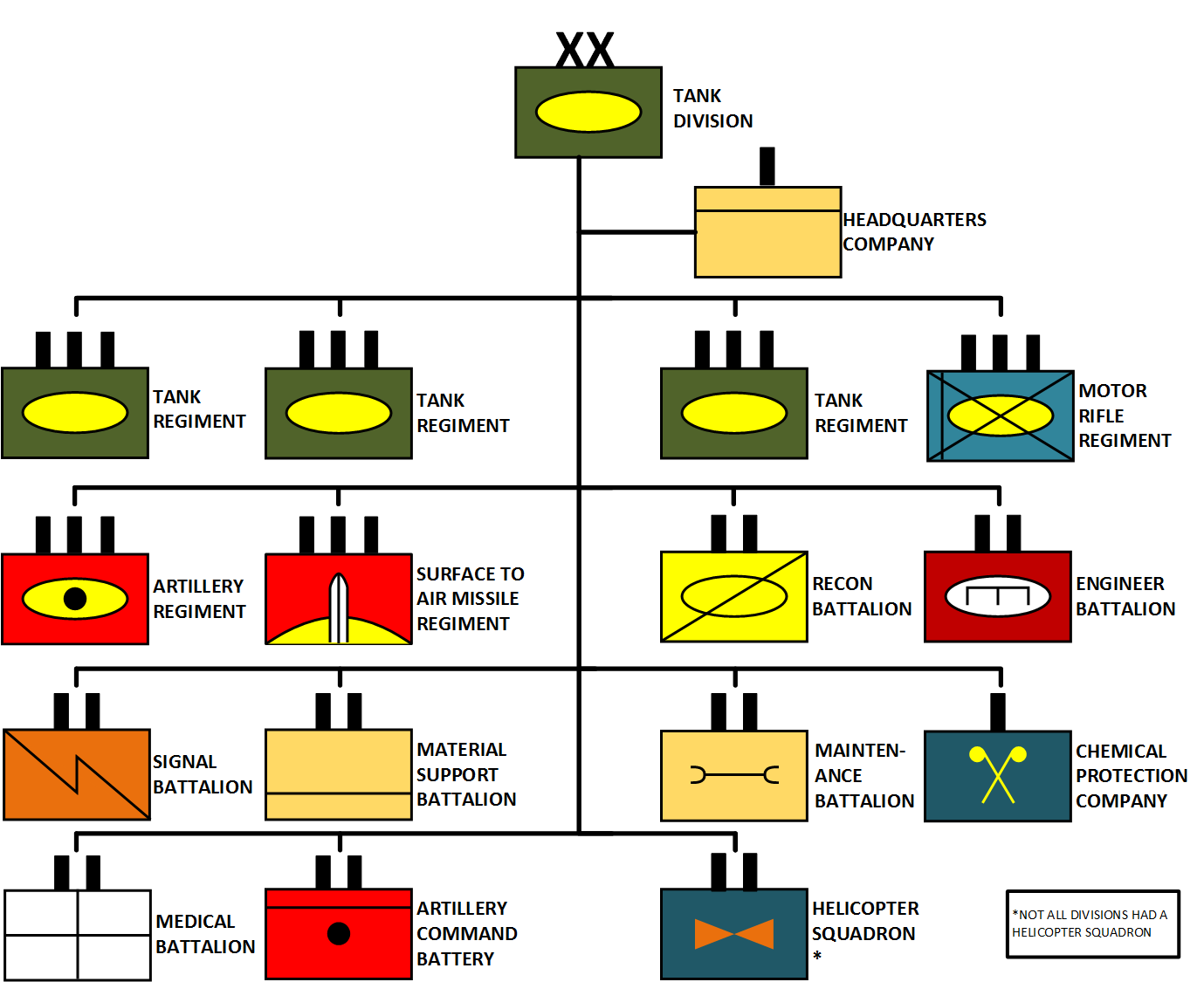
The structure of a Soviet armoured division from the same era

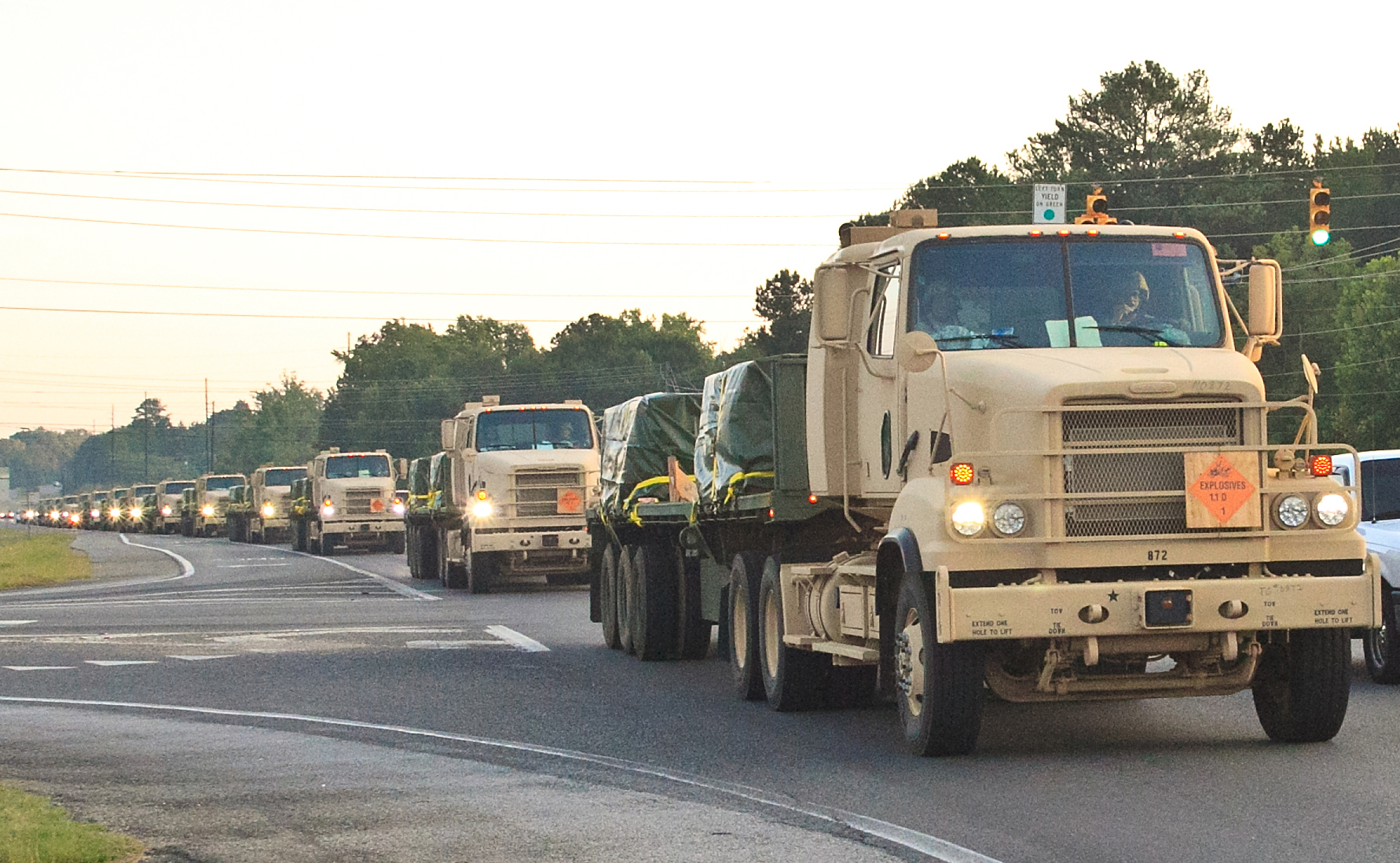
A division slice also takes into account logistics troops, such as those operating supply trucks.

A division slice is a calculation of the number of service personnel required to keep an army division operational. This includes combat units, combat support, troops on the lines of communication and also those on the home front either as replacements or in training. It is a useful measure for general staffs to compare different operational units within their command. It is less useful when comparing between different armed forces due to structural differences in support arrangements. During the Cold War the division slice was used by some commentators to criticise the US Army for "extravagances" in resourcing compared to Soviet forces. However, once structural differences were factored, there was less difference between the two armies.

== Description ==
A division slice includes the actual personnel of the combat division but also combat support units, lines of communication troops and, sometimes, troops in the zone of the interior (home front). The slice, therefore, includes not just the men assigned or attached to the division but also its share of the supporting services such as logistics troops. The number of zone-of-interior troops can fluctuate significantly as it includes personnel who are sick or wounded and those in training or travelling. The slice is calculated by dividing the number of personnel in a given area by the number of combat divisions that are operating there. The division slice can be calculated on a worldwide basis where the manpower of the entire army is divided by the number of combat divisions (in which case it includes troops stationed on the home front) or on a theatre level where the calculation is made only on manpower and divisions within a certain theatre of operations.

The calculation is regarded as a useful rule of thumb for planning by an army's general staff and is good for making comparisons between different parts of the same army. An estimate of number of divisions fielded by an army can be made when an overall manpower figure is known and an estimate of division slice can be made. This method was used by the US to correctly estimate the strength of the Soviet Army at the end of the Second World War at 175 divisions. However, by 1960 the Soviet Army began increasing its overall manpower while maintaining the same division numbers, resulting in a larger division slice. Because American intelligence assumed that the division slice would not increase, the greater effectiveness of Soviet divisions was not detected.

The division slice may not be a good measure for comparisons between different armed forces as different nations may allocate some army work, particularly logistics and transport, to non-military personnel. During the Cold War division slice comparisons between the US armed forces and those of the Soviets, who generally had a smaller division slice value, were used to criticise perceived "extravagances" in the American force. The differences were because of different strategies followed by the Americans and the Soviets. The Soviets, who anticipated that any confrontation with NATO would be a short and violent war, structured their divisions to have a proportionately larger combat element with minimal logistics support. American divisions were structured with larger logistics and combat support elements, which it was felt contributed to a more effective fighting unit.

American and European divisions were designed to be continually reinforced to replace losses and so were backed up with reserve troops and those still in training. In contrast, Soviet divisions that suffered heavy casualties would simply be withdrawn from the line and replaced with a fresh division. Different training periods also had an effect on the division slice. Soviet troops had shorter training periods and longer terms of service and so did not spend as much time away from their division. American soldiers in 1950 spent one third of their typical 21-month term of service in training in the zone of the interior. The Soviet forces also generally maintained fewer medical units and, having shorter lines of communication to a potential conflict in Europe, lower logistics requirements. Soviet forces also made greater use of civilians to provide labour and to man anti-aircraft artillery, who were not counted in division slice calculations. When such factors, and the fact that Soviet combat divisions were generally smaller than American divisions, are taken into account, the disparity between the American and Soviet division slice is much less.

== Historical comparatives ==
A Soviet combat division at the start of Operation Barbarossa in June 1941 numbered around 8,000–9,000 men and a division slice was approximately twice that at 16,600. As the war progressed the combat divisions dropped in size to 10,500 by 1942 and perhaps 5,000 or fewer by the end of the war, the division slice likewise contracted to 13,400 and 12,300, respectively.

During the Second World War the worldwide US division slice was around 90,200, but this included a contribution from the United States Army Air Corps or United States Army Air Forces. A typical theatre division slice was around 35,500 in Europe and 34,300 in the Southwest Pacific Area; with combat divisions standing around 14,300 men. The division slice for the Australian Army was 64,000; for those outside Australia, it was about 31,000. The Canadian Army's division slice was 93,150, while that of the British Army was about 84,300.

US Army division slices by theatre in World War II (on 30 June 1945)
Theatre	Divisions	Classification of troops									
Theatre	Divisions	Combat arms		Combat support		Combat service support		Service support		Total	
Theatre	Divisions	Strength	Per cent	Strength	Per cent	Strength	Per cent	Strength	Per cent	Strength	Per cent
European	61	13,301	37.49	6,692	18.86	7,323	20.64	8,164	23.01	35,480	100
Mediterranean	7	13,616	41.92	4,395	13.53	7,844	24.15	6,626	20.40	32,481	100
Southwest Pacific Area	15	13,551	39.46	6,267	18.25	5,467	15.92	9,055	26.37	34,340	100
Central Pacific	6	14,045	26.49	17,046	32.15	11,071	20.88	10,858	20.48	53,020	100

In the immediate aftermath of the war division slices stood at around 13,000–15,000 for the Soviet forces (with combat divisions of 9,000–12,000 men) and around 40,000 for Western forces (with combat divisions of 16,000–18,000 men). By 1950 the US division slice stood at around 35,000, though this increased significantly to around 50,000 men if a division were deployed 1,500 miles (2,400 km) from home (as for example US forces were in the Second World War). Much of the increase in troop numbers was driven by a 33% increase in the number of combat troops in a division, only 25% of the slice was made up of troops from the zone of the interior. By 1950 the worldwide division slice for US troops was around 80,000, and the Korean theatre division slice was 35,800; this compared to a Soviet division slice of 20,000 for 1960.

In 1974 the division slice for Soviet forces was approximately 16,000. The West German army stood at 26,300, British Army at 27,500 and US Army at 39,000. By 1977 a Soviet mechanised combat division of 12,500 men had a division slice of 17,000, and US mechanised divisions of 16,000 men had a division slice of 48,000. At the end of the Cold War in 1990 the Netherlands Army had the largest division slice size of any in NATO, standing at 68,000, with the figures being skewed by large numbers of reservists and replacements in that force.
