= List of Jacky Cheung live performances =

Jacky Cheung live performances
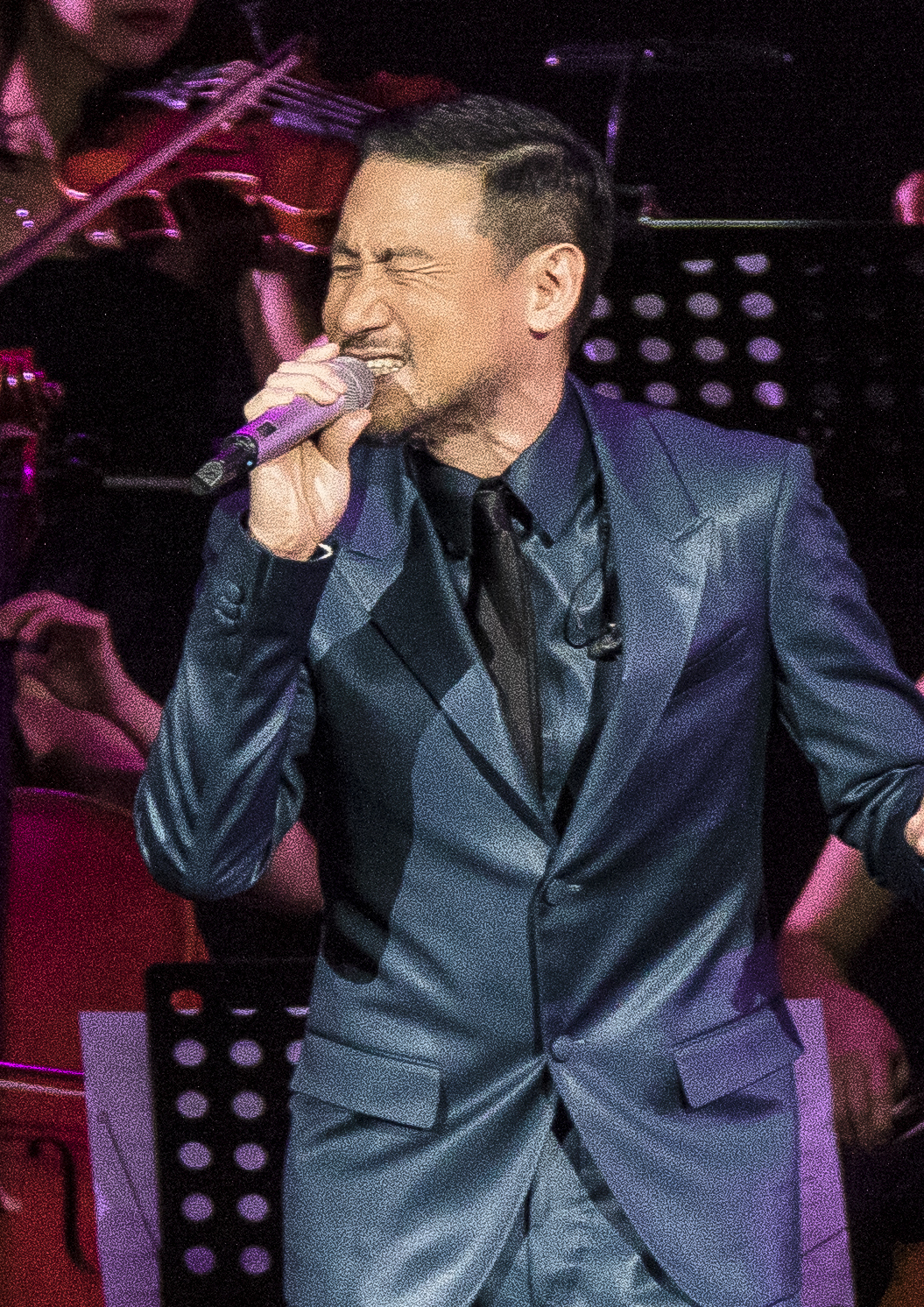
- Cheung at the 2015 KKBOX Music Awards
- Concert tours: 10
- One-off concerts: 13+
- Musicals: 1

Hong Kong singer and actor Jacky Cheung has embarked on ten concert tours since his debut in 1985. One of the most successful touring artists in the Sinosphere, Cheung has held over 1,000 concerts across Asia, North America, Oceania, and Europe during his 40-year career.

He held his first concert tour in August 1987, which spanned six consecutive shows at the Hong Kong Coliseum. His first world tour was held in 1991, which included shows in Hong Kong, Atlantic City, Toronto, and Guangzhou. Cheung embarked on his fourth tour in 1995, which attracted 2 million people across 100 shows. His seventh concert tour, the Year of Jacky Cheung World Tour, ran from February 2007 to February 2008 and attracted over 3 million people across 105 concerts.

During the Jacky Cheung 1/2 Century World Tour, which began in December 2010, Cheung broke his own record for the greatest number of concerts held by a Chinese singer in a single tour with 146 shows. The tour also set a Guinness World Record for the largest combined audience of a live act in a year, with a total audience of 2,048,553 people within twelve months. The tour concluded in May 2012 with a cumulative attendance of 2.8 million people.

Cheung's ninth concert tour, A Classic Tour, ran from October 2016 to January 2019. It attracted 4.5 million people across 233 concerts and grossed $330 million in revenue, making it amongst the highest-attended concert tours of all time. The ongoing Jacky Cheung 60+ Concert Tour began in June 2023 and currently spans over 250 concerts across Asia.

== Concert tours ==
List of headlining concert tours, showing dates, locations, number of shows, and attendance
Title	Date(s)	Location	Shows	Attendance	Ref.
Jacky Cheung 87 Concert	1 August 1987 – 6 August 1987	Hong Kong	6	—	
Love You More Every Day 91 Tour	28 September 1991 – 14 December 1991	Asia; North America	15	—	
School & Friends World Tour	24 September 1993 – 17 December 1994	Asia; North America	65	—	
Jacky Cheung World Tour	4 August 1995 – 30 June 1996	Asia; Australia; North America	100	2,000,000	
Friends World Tour	5 February 1999 – 10 July 1999	Asia; North America; Oceania; Europe	66	—	
Music Odyssey Tour	15 March 2002 – 27 January 2003	Australia; Asia; Europe; North America	46	—	
The Year of Jacky Cheung World Tour	18 February 2007 – 3 February 2008	North America; Asia; Oceania	105	3,000,000	
Jacky Cheung 1/2 Century World Tour	30 December 2010 – 30 May 2012	Asia; North America; Oceania	146	2,800,000	
A Classic Tour	21 October 2016 – 29 January 2019	Asia; North America; Oceania; Europe	233	4,500,000	
Jacky Cheung 60+ Concert Tour	9 June 2023 – 24 January 2026	Asia; North America; Oceania	324	—	

== One-off concerts ==
Event name	Date	City	Venue	Attendance	Ref.
Taipei Blessings Concert	28 May 1994	Taipei	Taipei Municipal Stadium	—	
Love and Symphony Concert	24–25 March 1996	Hong Kong	Hong Kong Coliseum	—	
I Can't Forget You Concert	12 March 1996	Taipei	Daan Forest Park	—	
Music Without Borders Concert	26–27 October 1996	Hong Kong	Hong Kong Coliseum	—	
Yue Lai Yue You Jin Concert	26 September 1997	Taipei	Nangang 101	—	
Kaohsiung Sparks Concert	25 October 1997	Kaohsiung	National Science and Technology Museum	—	
Walking Through 1999 Concert	27 November 1999	Taipei	Chiang Kai-shek Memorial Hall	—	
Walking Through 1999 Concert	28 November 1999	Taichung	Taichung Civic Plaza	—	
Jacky Cheung 903 Live Concert	30 April 2001	Hong Kong	HKCEC New Wing	—	
Long Time No See Concert	25 March 2003	Taipei	Taipei International Convention Center	—	
Concert for Friends	30 April 2004	Hong Kong	TVB City	—	
Live Out Life Concert	5 October 2004	Hong Kong	Hong Kong Convention & Exhibition Centre	—	
Private Corner Mini Concert	30 April 2010	Hong Kong	Hong Kong Polytechnic University	—	
Wake Up Dreaming Concert	24 May 2015	Beijing	National Olympic Sports Centre	8,000	

== Musicals ==
Title	Date(s)	Location	Shows	Attendance
Snow.Wolf.Lake (Cantonese version)	28 March 1997 – 27 November 1997	Hong Kong; Singapore	49	—
Snow.Wolf.Lake (Mandarin version)	24 December 2004 – 7 January 2006	Asia	56	—
