= Unifi Arena =

Multi-purpose indoor arena in Kuala Lumpur, Malaysia

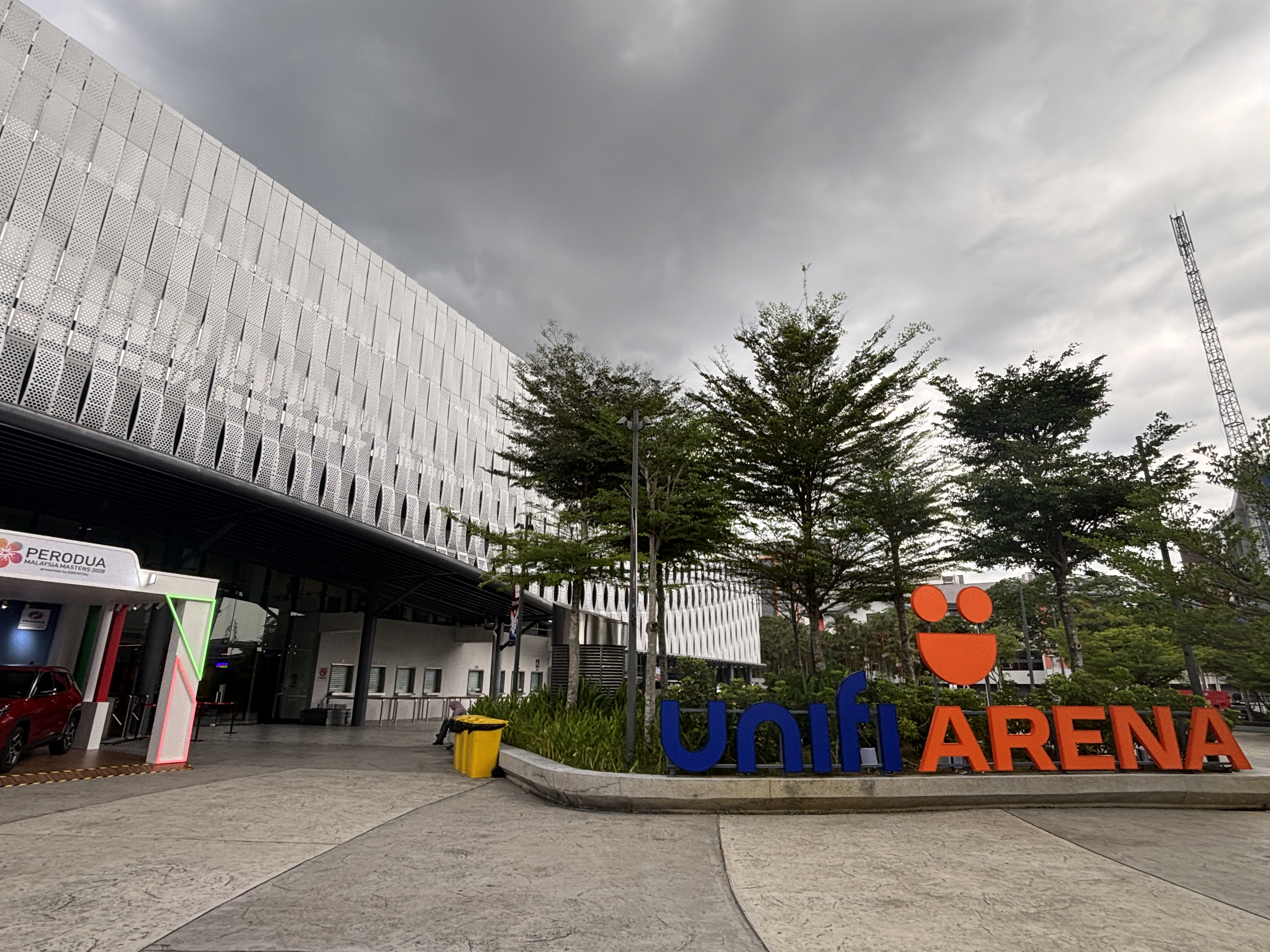
- Interactive map of Unifi Arena
- Former names: Axiata Arena (2017–2026) Stadium Putra (1998-2017)
- Location: Bukit Jalil, Kuala Lumpur; Malaysia
- Coordinates: 3°03′13″N 101°41′37″E
- Owner: Malaysian government
- Operator: KL Sports City
- Capacity: 16,000 (sports); 11,000 (concert)
- Scoreboard: LED Panel by Samsung
- Field size: 69 × 25 meter
- Public transit: SP17 Bukit Jalil LRT station

Construction
- Opened: 1998
- Renovated: 2017

Tenants
- Malaysia Open; Malaysia Masters; Malaysian Open (2009–2015); ANZ Championship (2012–2015)

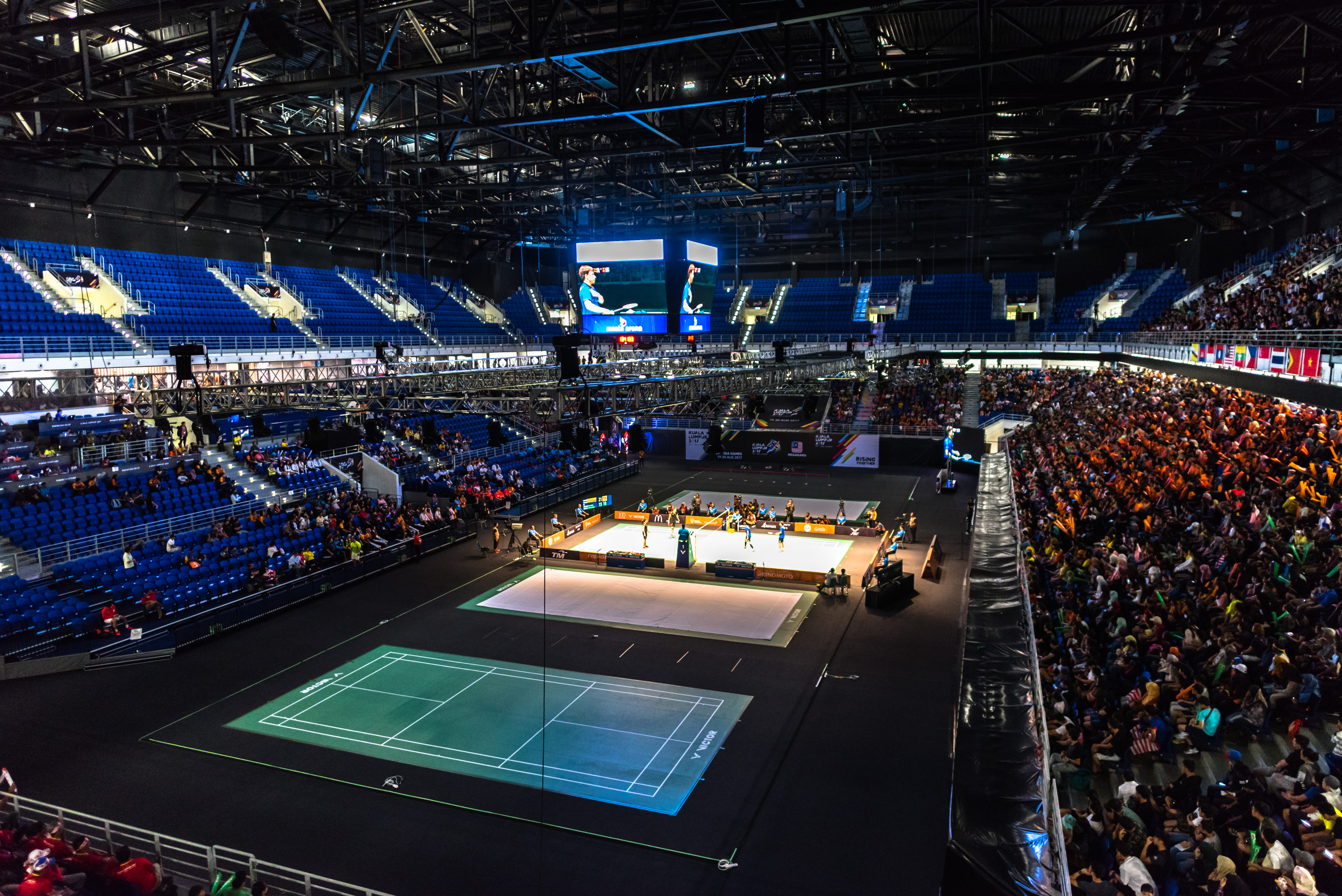
Interior of the arena

Putra Indoor Stadium (Malay: Stadium Putra), currently named as Unifi Arena for sponsorship reasons, is a multi-purpose indoor arena in Kuala Lumpur, Malaysia.

== Background ==
The stadium is located in the premise of the National Sports Complex of Bukit Jalil, Kuala Lumpur, Malaysia. It is one of several sports facilities in the National Sports Complex which includes the main stadium, Bukit Jalil National Stadium, National Hockey Stadium, National Squash Centre, National Aquatic Centre and the Seri Putra Hall.

The arena has the highest seating capacity of any indoor venue in Malaysia with a maximum capacity of 16,000 seats. The stadium has 3 main doors which lead to a rectangular arena 69 × 25 meters large, which can adapt to different sports formats like boxing, badminton, basketball, volleyball, table tennis, judo, handball, wrestling and gymnastics.

=== History ===
On 15 August 2009, former Malaysia's Prime Minister Tun Abdullah Ahmad Badawi opened the 2009 ASEAN Para Games in Putra Indoor Stadium. Closing ceremonies on 19 August 2009 were also attended by the Youth and Sports Minister of Malaysia. The main venue for the gymnastics competitions during Kuala Lumpur 1998 Commonwealth Games, this was also the venue for sport and entertainment events such as World Equestrian Games, Disney on Ice and more.

On 31 August 2010, Putra Indoor Stadium hosted the Independence Day Parade. This was in view of the ongoing Ramadhan season. It was also the first time the Independence Day Parade was held indoors. The celebration was attended by the Yang Di-Pertuan Agong, the Prime Minister of Malaysia and also cabinet members.

=== Naming rights deals ===
On 16 January 2017, Putra Stadium has been rebranded as Axiata Arena in an effort towards building a sporting nation. This is Malaysia's first corporate name stadium in partnership between Axiata Group Berhad and Perbadanan Stadium Malaysia (PSM). Axiata Arena will be the landmark for the redevelopment of Bukit Jalil Sports Complex which will be known as KL Sports City (KLSC).

Beginning 6 March 2026, the stadium is known as "Unifi Arena" following naming rights partnership with Telekom Malaysia Berhad.

== Notable events ==
=== Live Events ===
- Gymnastics – 1998 Commonwealth Games
- Thomas Cup and Uber Cup 2000
- Tang Long Imperial World Dragon and Lion Dance Championship 2002
- WWE Smackdown Live in Malaysia 2002
- 2006 AYA Festival with Delirious? Asian Youth Ambassadors
- 2007 BWF World Championships
- 2009 ASEAN Para Games
- 2010 Independence Day Parade (first National Day celebration in an indoor stadium, third stadium celebration)
- Malaysia Open Super Series
- Disney on Ice
- Disney's High School Musical: The Ice Tour
- Annual Cheerleading Contests organized by The Star newspaper
- Annual national-level secondary schools' brass band competition organised by the Ministry of Education
- Anugerah Juara Lagu 26, 2011
- One Fighting Championship, 2 February 2013
- WWE Live Event, 10–11 October 2014
- 16th IIFA Awards, 5 June 2015
- Anugerah Juara Lagu 32, 12 February 2018
- Anugerah Mele Top Ere 2018, 8 April 2018
- Manny Pacquiao vs. Lucas Matthysse, 15 July 2018
- The Kuala Lumpur Major, 9–18 November 2018
- Lazada 11.11 Super Show, 10 November 2018 (Special guest : Kard)
- Anugerah Juara Lagu 33, 3 February 2019
- Anugerah Mele Top Era 2019, 21 April 2019
- MLBB M1 World Championship, 15–17 November 2019
- Anugerah Juara Lagu 34, 9 February 2020
- Anugerah Mele Top Era 2020, 20 December 2020
- Anugerah Juara Lagu 37, 12 February 2023
- Seven Screen Studios Leo Movie Audio Launch, September 2023
- All Stars Gegar Vaganza (Final), 10 December 2023
- Anugerah Juara Lagu 38, 3 March 2024
- MLBB M6 World Championship, 14 - 15 December 2024
- Anugerah Juara Lagu 39, 15 February 2025

=== Live Concerts ===
The arena has hosted a lineup of concerts and performances by renowned artists and bands, representing diverse genres from around the world.

Key
Indicates cancelled shows

Date	Main act(s)	Tour / Concert Name	Notes
1999 - 2009
21–22 August 1999	Faye Wong	Scenic Tour	
26 May 2001	Westlife	Where Dreams Come True Tour	
18 March 2005	Backstreet Boys, Black Eyed Peas, Boyz II Men, Lauryn Hill, Wyclef Jean	Force of Nature for Tsunami Aid	
1 February 2005	Sting	Sacred Love Tour	
25–26 November 2005	Jacky Cheung	Classic Musical – Snow Wolf Lake 2005	
28 November 2009	Sandy Lam	Live 09 Concert	
2010
14 October 2010	Adam Lambert	Glam Nation Tour	
20 March 2010	Super Junior	Super Show 2 The 2nd ASIA Tour	With a sold-out crowd of 14,833 people.
2011
19 March 2011	Super Junior	Super Show 3 The 3rd ASIA Tour	With a sold-out crowd of 12,582 people.
6 November 2011	Faye Wong	Comeback Tour 2010-12	
8–11 December 2011	Jacky Cheung	Jacky Cheung 1/2 Century Tour	
7 October 2011	Westlife	Gravity Tour	
30 October 2011	Whitesnake	Forevermore World Tour	
2013
2–3 March 2013	Mayday	Nowhere World Tour	
20 July 2013	S.H.E	2gether 4ever World Tour	
20 July 2013	Super Junior	Super Show 5	With a sold-out crowd of 13,985 people and a revenue of $1,855,292.
27 November 2013	Alicia Keys	Set the World on Fire Tour	
2014
11 June 2014	Taylor Swift	The Red Tour	The sold-out show was attended by 7,525 fans
27 January 2014	Michael Bublé	To Be Loved Tour Live in Kuala Lumpur	
20 December 2014	Stefanie Sun	Kepler World Tour	
2015
23–24 January 2015	G.E.M.	X.X.X. Live Tour	
24–25 July 2015	BigBang	Made World Tour	
2017
14 November 2017	Ed Sheeran	÷ Tour	
18 November 2017	G.E.M.	Queen of Hearts World Tour	
16 December 2017	Hatsune Miku	Miku Expo	
2018
26–28 January 2018	Jacky Cheung	A Classic Tour	
9 May 2018	Bruno Mars	24K Magic World Tour	
7 July 2018	EXO	Exo planet #4 – The EℓyXiOn	
21 July 2018	Wanna One	One: The World Live in Malaysia	
7–8 September 2018	JJ Lin	Sanctuary World Tour	
24 August 2018	Boyzone	25th Anniversary World Tour in Malaysia	
2019
16 February 2019	Joker Xue	Skyscraper World Tour in Kuala Lumpur	
16 March 2019	Dato' Sri Siti Nurhaliza	Dato' Sri Siti Nurhaliza On Tour	
23 March 2019	Ong Seong-wu	Fan Meeting Eternity Tour Live in Kuala Lumpur	
13 May 2019	Jason Mraz	Good Vibes Tour	
17 August 2019	Twice	Twice World Tour 2019 "Twicelights"	
5 October 2019	Shawn Mendes	Shawn Mendes: The Tour	
14 December 2019	EXO	EXO PLANET #5- EXplOration	
21 December 2019	IU	2019 IU Tour Concert "Love, Poem"	
31 December 2019	Namewee	4896 World Tour	
2020
18 January 2020	Winner	Cross Tour in Kuala Lumpur	
22 February 2020	Seventeen	Ode to You World Tour	Cancelled due to COVID-19
1 March 2020	Super Junior	Super Show 8: Infinite Time	Cancelled due to COVID-19
7 March 2020	Got7	Got7 World Tour 2019–2020 Keep Spinning	Cancelled due to COVID-19
2022
9–10 September 2022	Dewa 19	Tour 30 Tahun 30 Kota	
6 November 2022	LANY	A November to Remember	
17 December 2022	Jackson Wang	Magic Man World Tour 2022–2023	
2023
23–24 February 2023	Westlife	The Wild Dreams Tour	
12–14 May 2023	Eason Chan	Fear and Dreams World Tour	
20 May 2023	NCT Dream	The Dream Show 2: In A Dream	
2–4 June 2023	Eric Chou	Odyssey ~ Journey World Tour	
11–13 August 2023, 18–20 August 2023	Jacky Cheung	60+ Concert Tour	
9–10 September 2023	Wakin Chau	2023 World Tour	
17 September 2023	Alan Walker	Walkerverse: The Tour Finale	
15 December 2023	One Ok Rock	Luxury Disease Asia Tour	
23–25 December 2023	Joker Xue	Extraterrestrial World Tour	
2024
17 February 2024	IVE	Show What I Have World Tour	
9 March 2024	Siti Nurhaliza	Sebuah Epitome Saya Siti Nurhaliza	
8–9 June 2024	IU	HEREH World Tour	
3 August 2024	Super Junior	SUPER SHOW SPIN-OFF: Halftime Asia Tour	
24–27 October 2024	Andy Lau	Today... is the Day Tour	
2 November 2024	Fujii Kaze	Best Of Fujii Kaze 2020-2024 Asia Tour	
23–24 November 2024	Dua Lipa	Radical Optimism Tour	
30 November–1 December 2024	Eric Chou	Odyssey ~ Journey Returns World Tour	
7 December 2024	Taeyang	The Light Year World Tour	
2025
12-13 April	Zhou Shen	9.29Hz World Concert Tour	
21 June	Babymonster	Hello Monsters World Tour	
19–20 July	G-Dragon	Übermensch World Tour	
15–17, 22–24 August	Jacky Cheung	Jacky Cheung 60+ Concert Tour	
4-5 October	David Tao	Soul Power II	
13–14 December	NCT Dream	The Dream Show 4: Dream The Future	
2026
17 January	Super Junior	Super Show 10	
24 January	Wang Heye	Infinity & Beyond	
31 January	Day6	Day6 10th Anniversary Tour "The Decade"	
1 February	Inteam	Nur Kasih	
7 February	Dato' Awie, Ziana Zain & Erra Fazira	SEMBILU The Reunion Live in Concert	
14 February	Tomorrow X Together	WORLD TOUR <ACT:TOMORROW>	
21 February	Sam Lee	"One Day" World Tour	
22 February	Lee E-jun	Hear Love Together 2026	
8 March	Hai Lai A Mu	Better to Meet 2026 World Tour	
14 March	Sally Yeh & George Lam	WE ARE ONE	
22 March	Ateez	In Your Fantasy	
28 March	Kelly Chen	Season 2 World Tour	
4 April	IVE	SHOW WHAT I AM	
17–18 April	Sammi Cheng	Sammi Cheng ‘You & Mi’ World Tour	
25–26 April	Stefanie Sun	AUT NIHILO Tour	
29 April	One Ok Rock	Detox Asia Tour	
30 May	Treasure	Pulse On Tour	
2 June	Laufey	A Matter of Time Tour	
26 September	Avenged Sevenfold	Asia Tour	
24–25 October	Eric Chou	Odyssey.Stars World Tour	
14 November	Babymonster	Choom World Tour	
17 November	5 Seconds of Summer	Everyone's a Star! World Tour	
12–13 December	Dior (singer)	Kampung Girl World Tour	The first Malaysian Chinese female singer to sell out 2 consecutive shows at this venue
2027
2 January	Ele Yan Ren Zhong (颜人中)	“MOMENTⁿ”世界巡回演唱会 - 收官场	
