= Life Is a Dream (disambiguation) =

Life Is a Dream is a 1635 play by Pedro Calderón de la Barca.

Life Is a Dream may also refer to:

- Life Is a Dream (opera), a 2010 opera by Lewis Spratlan
- Life Is a Dream (1917 film), a German film by Robert Wiene
- Life Is a Dream (1986 film), a French film by Raúl Ruiz

== See also ==
- "Life Is Just a Dream", a 1995 song by Joel Feeney
- Life Is Like a Dream, a 2004 album by Jacky Cheung
- Life Is But a Dream (disambiguation)
