= Jacky Cheung discography =

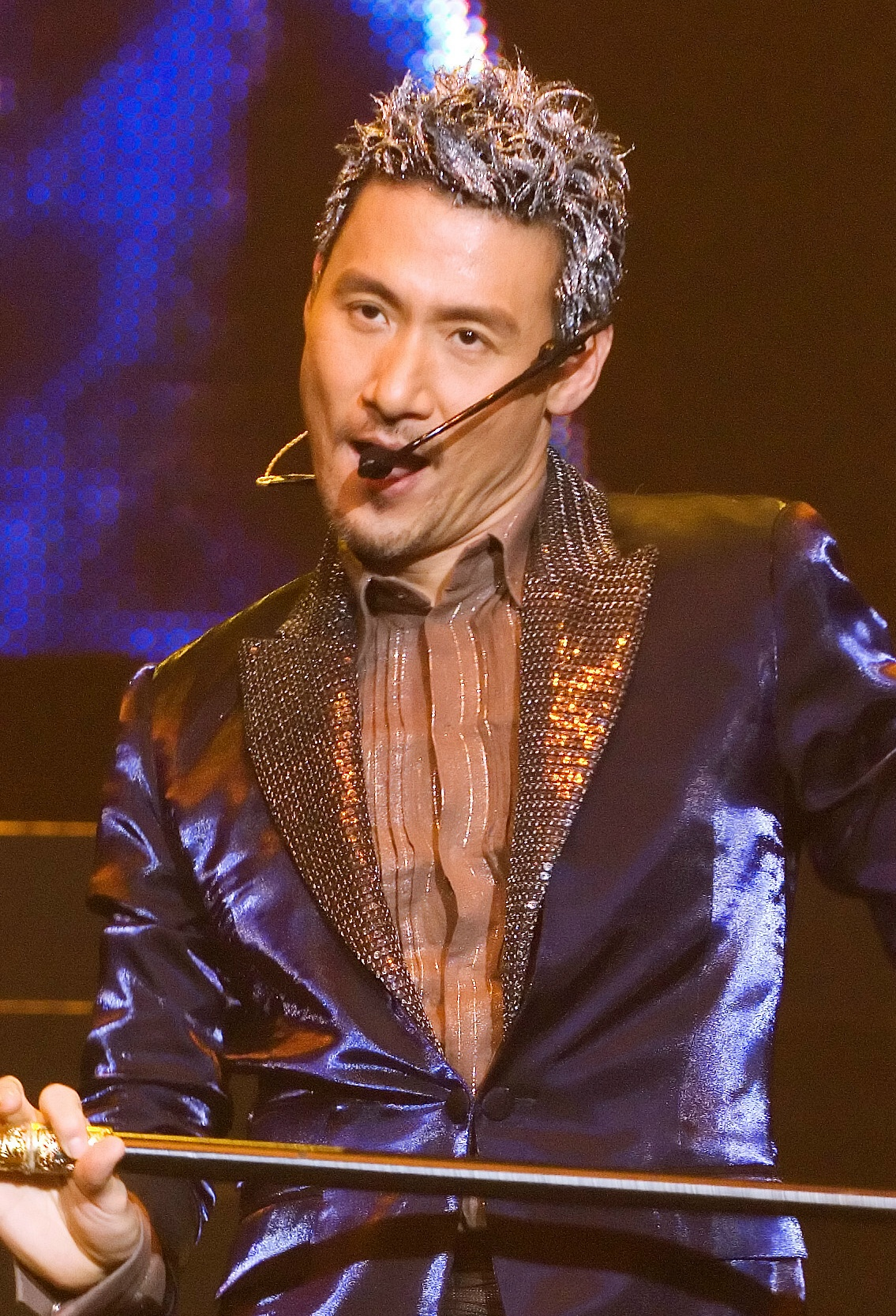
- Cheung in 2008
- Studio albums: 37
- Live albums: 10+
- Compilation albums: 5+

The discography of Hong Kong recording artist Jacky Cheung consists of 37 studio albums, including 22 in Cantonese and 15 in Mandarin. His fifth Mandarin studio album, The Goodbye Kiss, recorded sales of over 4,000,000 copies in China, 1,360,000 copies in Taiwan, 500,000 copies in Malaysia, and over 200,000 copies in Singapore, making it amongst the best-selling albums of all time in each country. In 1995, he sold over 5,000,000 copies of his albums, making him the second highest-selling artist in the world that year, behind Michael Jackson.

Cheung has reportedly sold 60 million albums throughout his career.

== Studio albums ==
=== Cantonese albums ===
| Title | Album details | Sales | Certifications |
|---|---|---|---|
| Smile | Released: 18 April 1985; Label: PolyGram Records | HK: 300,000 | IFPI HK: 6× Platinum |
| Amour (遥远的她) | Released: 5 January 1986; Label: PolyGram Records | HK: 400,000 | IFPI HK: 8× Platinum |
| Fall in Love (相爱) | Released: 23 October 1986; Label: PolyGram Records | | IFPI HK: Platinum |
| Jacky | Released: 26 June 1987; Label: PolyGram Records | | IFPI HK: Platinum |
| In My Dream Last Night (昨夜夢魂中) | Released: 15 March 1988; Label: PolyGram Records | | IFPI HK: Platinum |
| For My Dearest (给我亲爱的) | Released: 13 April 1989; Label: PolyGram Records | | IFPI HK: Platinum |
| I Only Want to Love One Person in My Life (只愿一生爱一人) | Released: 15 December 1989; Label: PolyGram Records | | IFPI HK: Platinum |
| Dreamed of You (梦中的你) | Released: 13 July 1990; Label: PolyGram Records | | |
| Can't Help You (情不禁) | Released: 23 January 1991; Label: PolyGram Records | | |
| An Unchanging Heart (一颗不变心) | Released: 28 August 1991; Label: PolyGram Records | | |
| True Feelings Revealed (真情流露) | Released: 13 May 1992; Label: PolyGram Records | HK: 400,000 | IFPI HK: 8× Platinum |
| Love Spark (爱火花) | Released: 27 November 1992; Label: PolyGram Records | HK: 400,000 | IFPI HK: 8× Platinum |
| You & I (我与你) | Released: 24 July 1993; Label: PolyGram Records | TWN: 800,000 | |
| Hungry Wolf (饿狼传说) | Released: 20 May 1994; Label: PolyGram Records | HK: 100,000 | IFPI HK: 2× Platinum |
| A Warm Winter (这个冬天不太冷) | Released: 20 December 1994; Label: PolyGram Records | | |
| Sensitive World (过敏世界) | Released: 28 June 1995; Label: PolyGram Records | | |
| Legend of Never Aging (不老的传说) | Released: 20 January 1997; Label: PolyGram Records | HK: 250,000 | IFPI HK: 5× Platinum |
| Release Yourself (释放自己) | Released: 3 June 1998; Label: PolyGram Records | | IFPI HK: Platinum |
| Someone (有个人) | Released: 26 January 1999; Label: PolyGram Records | | |
| The First (天下第一流) | Released: 25 May 2001; Label: What's Music International | | |
| Life Is Like a Dream | Released: 20 April 2004; Label: What's Music International | | |
| Private Corner | Released: 29 January 2010; Label: What's Music International, Universal | | |

=== Mandarin albums ===
| Title | Album details | Sales | Certifications |
|---|---|---|---|
| Homeless Love (情无四归) | Released: 9 May 1986; Label: PolyGram Records | | |
| Zai Wo Xin Shen Chu (在我心深处) | Released: 6 May 1987; Label: PolyGram Records | | |
| Yì Luàn Qíng Mí (意乱情迷) | Released: 26 January 1988; Label: PolyGram Records | | |
| Sì Céng Xiāng Shí (似曾相识) | Released: September 1989; Label: PolyGram Records | | |
| The Goodbye Kiss (吻别) | Released: 5 March 1993; Label: PolyGram Records | CHN: 4,000,000; TWN: 1,360,000; MLY: 500,000; SGP: 200,000 | |
| Blessings (祝福) | Released: 11 December 1993; Label: PolyGram Records | TWN: 910,000 | |
| Tou Xin (偷心) | Released: 23 August 1994; Label: PolyGram Records | | |
| Possession (拥友) | Released: 26 September 1995; Label: PolyGram Records | | |
| How Could I Forget You? (忘记你我做不到) | Released: 12 June 1996; Label: PolyGram Records | TWN: 1,060,000 | RIT: 5× Platinum |
| Want to Feel the Breeze With You (想和你去吹吹风) | Released: 22 December 1997; Label: PolyGram Records | TWN: 820,000 | RIT: 3× Platinum+Gold; IFPI HK: Platinum |
| No Regret (不后悔) | Released: 22 September 1998; Label: PolyGram Records | | |
| Walk By 1999 (走过1999) | Released: 11 November 1999; Label: PolyGram Records | TWN: 420,000 | |
| Jacky Fever (热) | Released: 26 September 2001; Label: What's Music International | | |
| By Your Side (在你身边) | Released: 26 January 2007; Label: What's Music International, Universal | | |
| Wake Up Dreaming | Released: 22 December 2014; Label: What's Music International, Universal | | |

== Compilation albums ==
| Title | Album details | Sales | Certifications |
|---|---|---|---|
| The Best of Memories (絲絲記憶情歌精選) | Released: 15 December 1989; Label: PolyGram Hong Kong | | IFPI HK: Platinum |
| Painfully Waiting For You (Selection) | Released: 26 November 1993; Label: PolyGram Hong Kong | | |
| True Love New Songs + Selections | Released: 16 March 1995; Label: PolyGram Hong Kong, Universal | TWN: 1,200,000 | |
| Jacky Cheung 15 | Released: 21 January 2000; Label: Universal Music Hong Kong | | |
| Black & White (1985–2004) | Released: September 2004; Label: What's Music International | | |

== Live albums ==
| Title | Album details | Cerifications |
|---|---|---|
| Jacky Cheung in Concert '87 | Released: 1987; Label: PolyGram Hong Kong | IFPI HK: Gold |
| Jacky Live in Concert 1999 | Released: 1 May 1999; Label: PolyGram Hong Kong | |
| Jacky 2002–2003 Music Odyssey | Released: 30 October 2003; Label: PolyGram Hong Kong | |
| Live the Life Concert | Released: 21 December 2004; Label: PolyGram Hong Kong | |
| Year of Jacky Cheung World Tour in Hong Kong | Released: 24 December 2008; Label: PolyGram Hong Kong | |
| Year of Jacky Cheung World Tour in Taipei | Released: 23 January 2009; Label: PolyGram Hong Kong | |
| Private Corner Mini Concert | Released: 23 July 2010; Label: PolyGram Hong Kong | |
| Jacky Cheung 1/2 Century Concert | Released: 20 August 2013; Label: Universal Music | |
| Jacky Cheung A Classic Tour Finale Hong Kong | Released: 23 December 2021; Label: Universal Music | |
| Jacky Cheung A Classic Tour Taipei | Released: 23 December 2021; Label: Universal Music | |

== Collaborations ==
- Priscilla Chan – "To My Dear" (給我最愛的), "A Pair of Lonely Hearts" (一對寂寞的心), "Love and Promise" (愛和承諾), "Being Close" (接近)
- Faye Wong – "Unusual Summer" (非常夏日), "Love, Can't Be Given Only Once" (愛，一次給不完)
- Kelly Chen – "Waiting for Your Love"
- Anita Mui – "Love Is Hard"' (相愛很難)
- Shirley Kwan – "Youngster No Love" (年少無情)
- Coco Lee – (從頭到尾)
- Sandy Lam – (日與夜)
- Vivian Chow – (留住秋色)
- Regine Velasquez – "In Love with You"
- Cally Kwong – "Only Love Persists" (祇有情永在)
- Karen Tong – "Miss Each Other in the Wind & Rain" (相思風雨中), "Deep Love for Half a Lifetime"(情濃半生)
- Vivian Lai – "Long Flow, Never Rests" (長流不息)
- He Ruhui – (似曾相識)
- Francesca Kao – "You're the Most Precious" (你最珍貴)
- Chen Jia Lu – (花與琴的流星(雪狼湖)), (愛狼說(雪狼湖))
- Gin Lee – "When the Sun Rises" (日出時讓街燈安睡)
