= 1993 Jade Solid Gold Best Ten Music Awards Presentation =

Hong Kong music awards ceremony

The 1993 Jade Solid Gold Best Ten Music Awards Presentation (Chinese: 1993年度十大勁歌金曲頒獎典禮) was held in January 1994. It is part of the Jade Solid Gold Best Ten Music Awards Presentation series held in Hong Kong.

== Top 10 song awards ==
The top 10 songs (十大勁歌金曲) of 1993 are as follows.

Song name in Chinese	Artist
祇想一生跟你走	Jacky Cheung
謝謝你的愛	Andy Lau
你今天要走	Sally Yeh
回首	Hacken Lee
夏日傾情	Leon Lai
情人Happy Birthday	Andy Lau
一人有一個夢想	Vivian Lai (黎瑞恩)
狂野之城	Aaron Kwok
執迷不悔	Faye Wong
等你等到我心痛	Jacky Cheung

== Additional awards ==
Award	Song name (if available for award)	Recipient(s)
The Best Duet Song Award ( 最受歡迎合唱歌曲獎)
Gold award	其實你心裡有沒有我	Andy Hui, Sammi Cheng
Silver award	選擇	George Lam, Sally Yeh
Bronze award	流言	Vivian Chow, Kevin Lin (林隆璇)
The Most Popular Mandarin Song Award ( 最受歡迎國語歌曲獎 )
Gold award	吻別	Jacky Cheung
Silver award	你是如此難以忘記	Tony Leung Chiu-Wai
Bronze award	新鴛鴦蝴蝶夢	Wong Ann
The Best Composition Award ( 最佳作曲獎 )	你是如此難以忘記	Music composers: Zau Zi Ping (周治平); Performed by: Tony Leung Chiu-Wai
The Best Lyric Award ( 最佳填詞獎 )	吻別	Lyrics by: Ho Kai Wang (何啟弘); Performed by: Jacky Cheung
The Best Music Arrangement Award ( 最佳編曲獎 )	夏日燒著了	Music Arrangement by: Gary Tong; Performed by: Leon Lai
The Best Song Producer Award ( 最佳歌曲監製獎 )	祇想一生跟你走	Music producer: Michael Au; Performed by: Jacky Cheung
The Most Popular New Artist Award, Male singer ( 最受歡迎新人獎, 男歌手 )
Gold award	---	Nicky Wu
Silver award	---	Kevin Cheng
Bronze award	---	Steven Ma
The Most Popular New Artist Award, Female singer ( 最受歡迎新人獎, 女歌手 )
Gold award	---	Charlie Yeung
Silver award	---	Linda Wong
Bronze award	---	Gigi Lai
The Best Music Video Award ( 最佳音樂錄影帶獎 )	熱力節拍 Wo Bom Ba	Director: Yeung Wai Yip (楊偉業); Performed by: Shirley Kwan, Grasshopper (Band members: Calvin Choy, Remus Choy, Edmond So), Winnie Lau, Karen Tong (湯寶如)
The Best Music Video Performance Award ( 最佳音樂錄影帶演出獎 )	廣播道Fans殺人事件	Softhard ( Band members: Jan Lamb, Eric Kot )
Mainland's Most Popular Male Singer Award ( 國內最受歡迎香港男歌星獎 )	---	Andy Lau
Mainland's Most Popular Female Singer Award ( 國內最受歡迎香港女歌星獎 )	---	Faye Wong
The Most Popular Male Artist Award ( 最受歡迎男歌星獎 )	---	Leon Lai
The Most Popular Female Artist Award ( 最受歡迎女歌星獎 )	---	Sally Yeh
Gold Song Gold Award ( 金曲金獎 )	祇想一生跟你走	Jacky Cheung
Jade Solid Gold Honour Award ( 金曲銀禧榮譽大獎 )	---	Danny Chan
Jade Solid Gold Honour Award ( 金曲銀禧榮譽大獎 )	---	Beyond in honor of Wong Ka Kui
