= A Classic Tour =

2016–2019 concert tour by Jacky Cheung

- Tour by Jacky Cheung
- Associated album: Various
- Start date: October 21, 2016
- End date: January 29, 2019
- No. of shows: 233
- Attendance: 4,500,000
- Box office: $330 million

Jacky Cheung concert chronology
- Jacky Cheung 1/2 Century World Tour （2010–12）; A Classic Tour （2016–19）; Jacky Cheung 60+ Concert Tour (2023–2026)

A Classic Tour (Chinese: 学友·经典世界巡回演唱会) was a concert tour by Hong Kong recording artist Jacky Cheung. The tour began on October 21, 2016, at the LeTV Sports Ecological Center in Beijing, China. It concluded on January 29, 2019, at the Hong Kong Coliseum in Hong Kong.

The tour attracted a total of 4,500,000 people and grossed approximately US$330 million, making it amongst the most-attended and highest-grossing concert tours of all time.

== Background and development ==
During a press conference on May 18, 2016, Cheung expressed his appreciation for the opportunity to continue performing concerts. After concluding his 1/2 Century Tour in 2012, he had doubts about whether he could sustain such performances at his age. However, after assessing his physical condition and stamina, he made the decision to embark on a new tour titled A Classic Tour, to showcase some of his most "classic" works.

It was revealed that the tour would begin in Beijing on October 21, 2016, and would continue throughout many other cities such as Chongqing, Shenzhen, Guangzhou, Shanghai and Wuhan. The tour featured a four-sided stage throughout the entire tour, similar to the setup used for his first solo concert at the Hong Kong Coliseum in 1987.

== Commercial performance ==
The Changsha concerts in November 2017 attracted over 100,000 and grossed over ¥66 million (US$9 million) in revenue. Pollstar ranked the December 2017 concerts in Shanghai number 24 in their top 100 international box office report, selling 54,900 tickets with $10,970,151 in revenue.

The concerts in Kaohsiung, Taiwan in January 2019 was attended by 40,000 people with more than NT$132 million in revenue.

== Setlist ==
This setlist does not represent all concerts for the duration of the tour.

Setlist
1. Me and You 我舆你
2. A Very Summer 非常夏日
3. Enjoy Tonight 今晚要嚍情
4. Leaving Person 离人
5. So Close Yet So Far 这么近那么远
6. How Can I Leave You 怎么舍得你
7. Love Sparks 爱火花
8. Forget Him 忘记他
9. She Came To My Concert 她来听我的演唱会
10. I am Really Hurt 我真的受伤了
11. Messy Hair 头发乱了
12. Reconciliation As Before 和好不和初
13. Lonely Man 寂寞的男人
14. Faraway Girl 遥远的她
15. Teardrops in Time 时间有泪
16. Let's Go Have A Walk 想和你去吹吹风
17. Wild Cat Love 野猫之恋
18. The Hungry Wolf Legend 饿狼传说
19. If This Is Not Love 如果这都不算爱
20. Wake Up Dreaming 我醒着做梦
21. Without Realizing 不经不觉
22. Spring and Autumn 春风秋雨
23. Your Name, My Surname 你的名字我的姓氏
24. Love Is Eternal 爱是永恒
25. Blessing 祝福
26. Love The Rest of Time 用余生去爱
27. To My Friend 给朋友
28. Heart Cut By A Blade 心如刀割
29. Legend Never Becomes Old 不老的传说
30. After You Left 离开以后
31. A Thousand Reasons To Be Sad 一千个伤心的理由
32. Only Want To Be With You 只想一生跟你走
33. I Waited Until The Flowers Wilted 我等到花儿都谢了
34. Breakup In The Rain 分手總要在雨天
35. Goodbye Kiss 吻别
36. Love You More Everyday 每天愛你多一些
37. Li Xiang Lan 李香蘭
38. Amour
39. Love Is Gone 情已逝
40. What If Love 如果爱

== Tour dates ==
List of 2016 concert dates
Date (2016)	City	Country	Venue	Attendance
October 21	Beijing	China	LeTV Sports Ecological Center	—
October 22	Beijing	China	LeTV Sports Ecological Center	—
October 23	Beijing	China	LeTV Sports Ecological Center	—
October 28	Chongqing	China	Chongqing International Expo Center	—
October 29	Chongqing	China	Chongqing International Expo Center	—
October 30	Chongqing	China	Chongqing International Expo Center	—
November 4	Shenzhen	China	Shenzhen Bay Sports Center	—
November 5	Shenzhen	China	Shenzhen Bay Sports Center	—
November 6	Shenzhen	China	Shenzhen Bay Sports Center	—
November 11	Guangzhou	China	Guangzhou International Sports Arena	—
November 12	Guangzhou	China	Guangzhou International Sports Arena	—
November 13	Guangzhou	China	Guangzhou International Sports Arena	—
November 18	Shanghai	China	Mercedes-Benz Arena	54,760
November 19	Shanghai	China	Mercedes-Benz Arena	54,760
November 20	Shanghai	China	Mercedes-Benz Arena	54,760
November 25	Wuhan	China	Optics Valley International Tennis Center	—
November 26	Wuhan	China	Optics Valley International Tennis Center	—
November 27	Wuhan	China	Optics Valley International Tennis Center	—
December 4	Hong Kong		Hong Kong Coliseum	240,000
December 5	Hong Kong		Hong Kong Coliseum	240,000
December 6	Hong Kong		Hong Kong Coliseum	240,000
December 8	Hong Kong		Hong Kong Coliseum	240,000
December 9	Hong Kong		Hong Kong Coliseum	240,000
December 10	Hong Kong		Hong Kong Coliseum	240,000
December 12	Hong Kong		Hong Kong Coliseum	240,000
December 13	Hong Kong		Hong Kong Coliseum	240,000
December 14	Hong Kong		Hong Kong Coliseum	240,000
December 16	Hong Kong		Hong Kong Coliseum	240,000
December 17	Hong Kong		Hong Kong Coliseum	240,000
December 18	Hong Kong		Hong Kong Coliseum	240,000
December 20	Hong Kong		Hong Kong Coliseum	240,000
December 21	Hong Kong		Hong Kong Coliseum	240,000
December 22	Hong Kong		Hong Kong Coliseum	240,000
December 24	Hong Kong		Hong Kong Coliseum	240,000
December 25	Hong Kong		Hong Kong Coliseum	240,000
December 26	Hong Kong		Hong Kong Coliseum	240,000
December 28	Hong Kong		Hong Kong Coliseum	240,000
December 29	Hong Kong		Hong Kong Coliseum	240,000
December 31	Hong Kong		Hong Kong Coliseum	240,000

List of 2017 concert dates
Date (2017)	City	Country	Venue	Attendance
January 1	Hong Kong	China	Hong Kong Coliseum	—
January 2	Hong Kong	China	Hong Kong Coliseum	—
January 6	Foshan	China	Lingnan Pearl Sports Center	—
January 7	Foshan	China	Lingnan Pearl Sports Center	—
January 8	Foshan	China	Lingnan Pearl Sports Center	—
January 13	Dongguan	China	Bank of Dongguan Basketball Center	—
January 14	Dongguan	China	Bank of Dongguan Basketball Center	—
January 20	Wuxi	China	Wuxi Sports Center	—
January 21	Wuxi	China	Wuxi Sports Center	—
January 22	Wuxi	China	Wuxi Sports Center	—
February 11	Taipei	Taiwan	Taipei Arena	66,000
February 12	Taipei	Taiwan	Taipei Arena	66,000
February 13	Taipei	Taiwan	Taipei Arena	66,000
February 17	Taipei	Taiwan	Taipei Arena	66,000
February 18	Taipei	Taiwan	Taipei Arena	66,000
February 19	Taipei	Taiwan	Taipei Arena	66,000
February 24	Singapore		Singapore Indoor Stadium	30,000
February 25	Singapore		Singapore Indoor Stadium	30,000
February 26	Singapore		Singapore Indoor Stadium	30,000
March 10	Shanghai	China	Mercedes-Benz Arena	54,405
March 11	Shanghai	China	Mercedes-Benz Arena	54,405
March 12	Shanghai	China	Mercedes-Benz Arena	54,405
March 24	Huizhou	China	Huizhou Olympic Sports Center Stadium	—
March 25	Zhuhai	China	Zhuhai Stadium	—
March 31	Fuzhou	China	Haixia Olympic Center	—
April 1	Quanzhou	China	Quanzhou Strait Sports Center Stadium	—
April 7	Taizhou	China	Taizhou Sports Center Stadium	—
April 8	Lishui	China	Lishui Sports Center Stadium	—
April 14	Yiwu	China	Yiwu Meihu Sports Centre	—
April 15	Shaoxing	China	Shaoxing China Textile City Sports Center	—
April 21	Nantong	China	Nantong Stadium	—
April 22	Suzhou	China	Suzhou Sports Center Stadium	—
April 28	Cixi	China	Cixi Sports Center Stadium	—
April 29	Changshu	China	Changshu Sports Center Stadium	—
May 5	Yangzhou	China	Yangzhou Sports Park Stadium	—
May 6	Changzhou	China	Changzhou Olympic Sports Center Stadium	—
May 12	Yancheng	China	Yancheng Chengnan Sports Center Stadium	—
May 13	Xuzhou	China	Xuzhou Olympic Sports Center Stadium	—
May 19	Zhenjiang	China	Zhenjiang Sports Exhibition Center	—
May 20	Hefei	China	Hefei Olympic Sports Center Stadium	—
May 28	Dazhou	China	Dazhou Sports Center	—
June 3	Guiyang	China	Guiyang Olympic Sports Center	—
June 4	Guiyang	China	Guiyang Olympic Sports Center	—
June 9	Zhongshan	China	Zhongshan Sports Center Stadium	—
June 10	Zhongshan	China	Zhongshan Sports Center Stadium	—
June 16	Zhengzhou	China	Henan Sports Center Stadium	—
June 17	Zhengzhou	China	Henan Sports Center Stadium	—
June 23	Baotou	China	Baotou Olympic Sports Center Stadium	—
June 25	Taiyuan	China	Taiyuan Red Lantern Stadium	—
June 30	Jinan	China	Shandong Provincial Stadium	—
July 1	Jining	China	Jining Sports Center Stadium	—
July 15	Harbin	China	HICEC Stadium	—
July 16	Daqing	China	Daqing Stadium	—
August 11	Macau		Cotai Arena	—
August 12	Macau		Cotai Arena	—
August 13	Macau		Cotai Arena	—
August 18	Macau		Cotai Arena	—
August 19	Macau		Cotai Arena	—
August 20	Macau		Cotai Arena	—
September 8	Xi'an	China	Shaanxi Provincial Stadium	—
September 9	Xi'an	China	Shaanxi Provincial Stadium	—
September 15	Linxia	China	Linxia Olympic Sports Center Stadium	—
September 22	Chengdu	China	Shuangliu Sports Centre	—
September 23	Chengdu	China	Shuangliu Sports Centre	—
October 1	Anshun	China	Anshun Olympic Sports Center Stadium	—
October 13	Tianjin	China	Tianjin Olympic Sports Center Stadium	—
October 14	Tianjin	China	Tianjin Olympic Sports Center Stadium	—
October 27	Wenzhou	China	Wenzhou Sports Center Stadium	—
November 3	Linyi	China	Linyi University Stadium	—
November 4	Huai'an	China	Huaian Sports Center	—
November 10	Suzhou	China	Wujiang Stadium	—
November 11	Hangzhou	China	Yellow Dragon Sports Center Stadium	—
November 12	Hangzhou	China	Yellow Dragon Sports Center Stadium	—
November 17	Xiamen	China	Xiamen Sports Centre Stadium	80,000
November 18	Xiamen	China	Xiamen Sports Centre Stadium	80,000
November 24	Hengyang	China	Hengyang Sports Center	—
November 25	Changsha	China	Helong Sports Center Stadium	100,000
November 26	Changsha	China	Helong Sports Center Stadium	100,000
December 1	Dalian	China	Dalian Sports Centre	—
December 2	Dalian	China	Dalian Sports Centre	—
December 3	Dalian	China	Dalian Sports Centre	—
December 9	Shenzhen	China	Longgang Universiade Center Stadium	—
December 10	Shenzhen	China	Longgang Universiade Center Stadium	—
December 15	Nanjing	China	Nanjing Olympic Sports Center	—
December 16	Nanjing	China	Nanjing Olympic Sports Center	—
December 17	Nanjing	China	Nanjing Olympic Sports Center	—
December 22	Shanghai	China	Mercedes-Benz Arena	54,900
December 23	Shanghai	China	Mercedes-Benz Arena	54,900
December 24	Shanghai	China	Mercedes-Benz Arena	54,900

List of 2018 concert dates
Date (2018)	City	Country	Venue	Attendance
January 13	Bangkok	Thailand	Impact Line Dome Convention Center	—
January 14	Bangkok	Thailand	Impact Line Dome Convention Center	—
January 19	Qujing	China	Qujing Sports Park Stadium	—
January 26	Kuala Lumpur	Malaysia	Axiata Arena	45,000
January 27	Kuala Lumpur	Malaysia	Axiata Arena	45,000
January 28	Kuala Lumpur	Malaysia	Axiata Arena	45,000
February 2	Uncasville	United States	Mohegan Sun Arena	—
February 3	Uncasville	United States	Mohegan Sun Arena	—
February 4	Uncasville	United States	Mohegan Sun Arena	—
February 9	Singapore		Singapore Indoor Stadium	30,000
February 10	Singapore		Singapore Indoor Stadium	30,000
February 11	Singapore		Singapore Indoor Stadium	30,000
February 17	Las Vegas	United States	MGM Grand Garden Arena	—
February 18	Las Vegas	United States	MGM Grand Garden Arena	—
March 9	Sydney	Australia	Qudos Bank Arena	—
March 17	Melbourne	Australia	Rod Laver Arena	—
March 24	Zhanjiang	China	Zhanjiang Sports Center Stadium	—
March 30	Guilin	China	Guilin Sports Center	—
April 1	Shaoxing	China	China Textile City Sports Center Stadium	—
April 6	Jiujiang	China	Jiujiang Sports Center Stadium	—
April 7	Nanchang	China	Nanchang International Sports Center Stadium	—
April 13	Foshan	China	Century Lotus Stadium	—
April 15	Wuzhou	China	Wuzhou Zhongheng Stadium	—
April 20	Taipei	Taiwan	Taipei Arena	66,000
April 21	Taipei	Taiwan	Taipei Arena	66,000
April 22	Taipei	Taiwan	Taipei Arena	66,000
April 27	Taipei	Taiwan	Taipei Arena	66,000
April 28	Taipei	Taiwan	Taipei Arena	66,000
April 29	Taipei	Taiwan	Taipei Arena	66,000
May 4	Ganzhou	China	Ganzhou Zhanggong District Sports Center Stadium	—
May 5	Ganzhou	China	Ganzhou Zhanggong District Sports Center Stadium	—
May 11	Liuzhou	China	Liuzhou Sports Center Stadium	—
May 12	Nanning	China	Guangxi Sports Center	—
May 20	Jiaxing	China	Jiaxing Stadium	—
May 25	Jingzhou	China	Jingzhou Olympic Sports Center Stadium	—
May 26	Jingzhou	China	Jingzhou Olympic Sports Center Stadium	—
June 8	Shangrao	China	Shangrao Olympic Center	—
June 9	Jinhua	China	Jinhua Sports Center	—
June 15	Zhuzhou	China	Zhuzhou Sports Center Stadium	—
June 16	Chenzhou	China	Chenzhou Sports Center Stadium	—
June 23	Wuhan	China	Optics Valley International Tennis Center	—
June 24	Wuhan	China	Optics Valley International Tennis Center	—
June 30	Shenyang	China	Shenyang Olympic Sports Center Stadium	—
July 1	Shenyang	China	Shenyang Olympic Sports Center Stadium	—
July 6	Hohhot	China	Hohhot City Stadium	—
July 8	Luoyang	China	Luoyang Stadium	—
July 13	Weihai	China	Weihai Sports Center Stadium	—
August 11	Dongguan	China	Bank of Dongguan Basketball Center	30,000
August 12	Dongguan	China	Bank of Dongguan Basketball Center	30,000
August 17	Macau		Cotai Arena	—
August 18	Macau		Cotai Arena	—
August 19	Macau		Cotai Arena	—
August 24	Macau		Cotai Arena	—
August 25	Macau		Cotai Arena	—
August 30	Lianyungang	China	Lianyungang Olympic Sports Center Stadium	—
September 7	Zunyi	China	Zunyi Olympic Sports Center Stadium	—
September 9	Jiaozuo	China	Jiaozuo Tai Chi Olympic Stadium	—
September 14	Chengdu	China	Shuangliu Sports Center Stadium	—
September 15	Chengdu	China	Shuangliu Sports Center Stadium	—
September 21	Suining	China	Suining Sports Center	—
September 22	Suining	China	Suining Sports Center	—
September 28	Shijiazhuang	China	Hebei Olympic Sports Center Stadium	—
September 30	Xianyang	China	Xianyang Olympic Sports Center Stadium	—
October 5	Kuala Lumpur	Malaysia	Axiata Arena	—
October 6	Kuala Lumpur	Malaysia	Axiata Arena	—
October 7	Kuala Lumpur	Malaysia	Axiata Arena	—
October 12	Kunming	China	Tuodong Stadium	—
October 13	Kunming	China	Tuodong Stadium	—
October 14	Kunming	China	Tuodong Stadium	—
October 20	Anqing	China	Anqing Sports Centre	—
October 21	Hefei	China	Hefei Sports Center Stadium	—
October 26	Nanjing	China	Nanjing Youth Olympic Sports Park Gymnasium	—
October 27	Nanjing	China	Nanjing Youth Olympic Sports Park Gymnasium	—
November 3	Haikou	China	Wuyuanhe Stadium	—
November 4	Haikou	China	Wuyuanhe Stadium	—
November 7	Saitama	Japan	Saitama Super Arena	—
November 17	Ningbo	China	Ningbo Sports Center	—
November 23	London	England	Wembley Arena	—
November 28	Paris	France	Accor Arena	—
December 14	Beijing	China	Cadillac Center	—
December 15	Beijing	China	Cadillac Center	—
December 16	Beijing	China	Cadillac Center	—
December 21	Jiangmen	China	Jiangmen Sports Center Stadium	—
December 22	Jiangmen	China	Jiangmen Sports Center Stadium	—
December 28	Suzhou	China	Suzhou Olympic Sports Centre	—
December 29	Suzhou	China	Suzhou Olympic Sports Centre	—
December 30	Suzhou	China	Suzhou Olympic Sports Centre	—

List of 2019 concert dates
Date (2019)	City	Country	Venue	Attendance
January 4	Kaohsiung	Taiwan	Kaohsiung Arena	40,000
January 5	Kaohsiung	Taiwan	Kaohsiung Arena	40,000
January 6	Kaohsiung	Taiwan	Kaohsiung Arena	40,000
January 11	Hong Kong		Hong Kong Coliseum	—
January 12	Hong Kong		Hong Kong Coliseum	—
January 13	Hong Kong		Hong Kong Coliseum	—
January 15	Hong Kong		Hong Kong Coliseum	—
January 16	Hong Kong		Hong Kong Coliseum	—
January 17	Hong Kong		Hong Kong Coliseum	—
January 19	Hong Kong		Hong Kong Coliseum	—
January 20	Hong Kong		Hong Kong Coliseum	—
January 21	Hong Kong		Hong Kong Coliseum	—
January 23	Hong Kong		Hong Kong Coliseum	—
January 24	Hong Kong		Hong Kong Coliseum	—
January 25	Hong Kong		Hong Kong Coliseum	—
January 27	Hong Kong		Hong Kong Coliseum	—
January 28	Hong Kong		Hong Kong Coliseum	—
January 29	Hong Kong		Hong Kong Coliseum	—
Total				4,500,000

== See also ==
- List of most-attended concert tours
- List of highest-grossing concert tours
