= 1985 RTHK Top 10 Gold Songs Awards =

Hong Kong music awards ceremony

The 1985 RTHK Top 10 Gold Songs Awards (Chinese: 1985年度十大中文金曲得獎) was held in 1985 for the 1984 music season. This is the first ceremony to offer the "Golden Needle Award".

== Top 10 song awards ==
The top 10 songs (十大中文金曲) of 1985 are as follows.

Song name in Chinese	Artist	Composer	Lyricist
雨夜的浪漫	Alan Tam	木喜三郎	Hoeng Syut-waai (向雪懷)
誰可相依	Julie Su	Lam man-yi (林敏怡)	Pun Jyun-loeng (潘源良)
不羈的風	Leslie Cheung	大澤譽志幸	Richard Lam
聽不到的說話	David Lui (呂方)	Saam Zan-lei (杉真理)	Hoeng Syut-waai (向雪懷)
最緊要好玩	Samuel Hui	Samuel Hui	Richard Lam
蔓珠莎華	Anita Mui	Zi Kei-lung (字崎龍)	Pun Wai-yun (潘偉源)
情已逝	Jacky Cheung	來生孝夫	Pun Jyun-loeng (潘源良)
每一個晚上	George Lam	Andrew Lloyd Webber Wong Zi (黃自)	Richard Lam
順流、逆流	Paula Tsui	Terrence Choi (蔡國權)	Terrence Choi (蔡國權)
愛情陷阱	Alan Tam	Hiroaki Serizawa (芹澤廣明)	Pun Jyun-loeng (潘源良)

== Other awards ==
Award	Song or album (if available)	Recipient
Best C-pop song award (最佳中文流行歌曲獎)	誰可相依	Lam man-yi (林敏怡)
Best C-pop lyrics award (最佳中文流行歌詞獎)	順流‧逆流	Terrence Choi (蔡國權)
Best new prospect award (最有前途新人獎)	-	(gold) Jacky Cheung; (silver) Susanne Ho (何嘉麗); (bronze) Cally Kwong (鄺美雲)
IFBI award (IFBI 大獎)	-	Alan Tam
RTHK Golden needle award (金針獎)	-	Samuel Hui
