= Jacky Cheung 1/2 Century Tour =

2010–12 concert tour by Jacky Cheung

Jacky Cheung 1/2 Century World Tour
- World tour by Jacky Cheung
- Jacky Cheung 1/2 Century World Tour
- Location: Asia; Australia; North America
- Start date: 30 December 2010
- End date: 30 May 2012
- No. of shows: 146
- Attendance: 2.8 million

Jacky Cheung concert chronology
- Year of Jacky Cheung World Tour 2007 (2007–08); Jacky Cheung 1/2 Century World Tour (2010–12); A Classic Tour (2016–19)

The Jacky Cheung 1/2 Century World Tour (Chinese: 张学友1/2世界巡迴演唱會) was a concert tour by Hong Kong singer and actor Jacky Cheung, one of the "Four Heavenly Kings" also known as "God of Songs", named in honor of his 50th birthday, marking a half-century of life in song and dance. The tour opened on 30 December 2010 at the Mercedes-Benz Arena, Shanghai and concluded on 20 May 2012 at the Hong Kong Coliseum, Hong Kong, consisting of 146 shows performed in 77 cities. The total audience was more than 2.8 million attendees with the number of people wanting to see the show exceeding the limited number of tickets.

Jacky Cheung was the artistic director of the tour. Andrew Tuason was the music director and Chen Xiaobin the choreographer, both of whom had worked with Cheung on previous projects. The Guangzhou Philharmonic Orchestra performed the string accompaniment for his concert tour. Florence Chan and Star Entertainment Limited produced the tour as the tour directors.

The staging included an oversize LED screen, theatrical production and changing sets along with laser lights and pyrotechnics for Cheung's repertoire of pop classics, songs from his musicals, rock, ballad, and jazz songs. Li Kwok Hoi served as the lighting director and one of technical directors, was awarded Best Collaboration Award from Cheung's team and all the concert organizers. IEC handled the design and set up of lighting system and stage.

Jacky Cheung broke his own record for the greatest number of concerts held by a Chinese singer in a single tour. He holds the Guinness World Record for "the largest combined audience of a live act in a year" with a total of 2,048,553 audiences in twelve months.

== Performance ==
Cheung's performance included segments in the style of a Broadway musical, a live action movie, an animated short film, and a jazz club. Andrew Lau, Hong Kong filmmaker, directed a love story between Cheung and Shu Qi, Taiwanese actress, played out on the stage while being shown on three screens in the background.

Cheung performed for three hours, singing and dancing, without any guest artists. He wore changing costumes, including a white tuxedo and top hat and shoes embroidered with Swarovski crystals. He sang Mandarin songs including Ru Guo Ai (Perhaps, Love) and Wen Bie (Goodbye Kiss) and Cantonese songs including Love Is Like A Dream, Snow.Wolf.Lake, Love You A Little More Each Day, Double Trouble, Let It Go, Fei Je and others from his Private Corner album.

== Press conference ==
On 24 November 2010, Cheung held a press conference to announce his "1/2 Century" tour, named to coincide with his 50th birthday and commemorate his achievement in the music industry. On 17 January 2011, a press conference for the 1/2 Century Tour was held at the Marriott Grand Hotel in Nanning.

== Jacky Cheung 1/2 Century Tour Live Concert DVD ==
July 2013, Cheung released his Jacky Cheung 1/2 Century Tour Live Concert DVD. The album had pre-sales of 40,000 copies, for which he received two double platinum discs from Universal Music. It was released as DVD, Blu-ray disc, and CD.

== Set list ==
The following set list was obtained from the concerts held at Asia-World Arena, Hong Kong in May 2012. It does not represent all concerts for the duration of the tour.

1. "Overture"
2. "The Playboy"
3. "What's Your Name, Girl"
4. "First Kiss"
5. "You're My Only Legend"
6. "You're First Name, My Surname"
7. "Before the Rain"
8. "Willing"
9. "A Tear Drop"
10. "Rain (Instrumental)"
11. "Man in the Rain"
12. "The Three Beats of Love"
13. "Perhaps. Love"
14. "Rock Prelude"
15. "The Weather is So Hot"
16. "Goodbye Kiss"
17. "When Love Becomes Habit"
18. "I Should"
19. "Lydia"
20. "Obsess Over You"
21. "After You've Gone"
22. "Love Net"
23. "Lover's Tear"
24. "I'm Really Hurt"
25. "Life is Like a Dream"
26. "Summer Night (Instrumental)"
27. "Double Trouble"
28. "Band Introduction"
29. "Li Xiang Lan"
30. "Love You More and More Everyday"
31. "An Unchanged Heart"
32. "Never Ending Past Love"
33. "Untraceable Heartbreak"
34. "Cut My Heart"
35. "Hungry Wolf"
36. "Messy Hair"
37. "This Winter's Not Too Cold"
38. "My Faraway Girl"
39. "How Can I Forget"
40. "A Lonely Man"
41. "Wanna Be With You Forever"
42. "True Love Expression"
43. "Blessing"

== Tour dates ==
List of tour dates
Date	City	Country	Venue
30 December 2010	Shanghai	China	Mercedes-Benz Arena
31 December 2010	Shanghai	China	Mercedes-Benz Arena
1 January 2011	Shanghai	China	Mercedes-Benz Arena
2 January 2011	Shanghai	China	Mercedes-Benz Arena
3 January 2011	Shanghai	China	Mercedes-Benz Arena
13 January 2011	Guangzhou	China	Guangzhou International Sports Arena
14 January 2011	Guangzhou	China	Guangzhou International Sports Arena
15 January 2011	Guangzhou	China	Guangzhou International Sports Arena
16 January 2011	Guangzhou	China	Guangzhou International Sports Arena
17 January 2011	Guangzhou	China	Guangzhou International Sports Arena
21 January 2011	Beijing	China	Wukesong Arena
22 January 2011	Beijing	China	Wukesong Arena
23 January 2011	Beijing	China	Wukesong Arena
28 January 2011	Chengdu	China	Chengdu Sports Centre
29 January 2011	Chengdu	China	Chengdu Sports Centre
30 January 2011	Chengdu	China	Chengdu Sports Centre
6 February 2011	Las Vegas	United States	The Colosseum at Caesars Palace
7 February 2011	Las Vegas	United States	The Colosseum at Caesars Palace
8 February 2011	Las Vegas	United States	The Colosseum at Caesars Palace
26 February 2011	Xiamen	China	Xiamen Sports Center Stadium
27 February 2011	Quanzhou	China	Quanzhou Strait Sports Center Stadium
4 March 2011	Wenzhou	China	Wenzhou Sports Center Stadium
6 March 2011	Hangzhou	China	Yellow Dragon Sports Center
11 March 2011	Taizhou	China	Taizhou Sports Center Stadium
13 March 2011	Fuzhou	China	Fujian Sports Center Stadium
18 March 2011	Suzhou	China	Suzhou Sports Center Stadium
20 March 2011	Changshu	China	Changshu Sports Center Stadium
25 March 2011	Taizhou	China	Taizhou Sports Center Track and Field Field
26 March 2011	Nantong	China	Nantong Sports Convention and Exhibition Center Stadium
1 April 2011	Jiangyin	China	Jiangyin Sports Center Stadium
3 April 2011	Chongqing	China	Chongqing Olympic Sports Center
14 April 2011	Hong Kong	China	Hung Hom Stadium
15 April 2011	Hong Kong	China	Hung Hom Stadium
16 April 2011	Hong Kong	China	Hung Hom Stadium
17 April 2011	Hong Kong	China	Hung Hom Stadium
18 April 2011	Hong Kong	China	Hung Hom Stadium
21 April 2011	Hong Kong	China	Hung Hom Stadium
22 April 2011	Hong Kong	China	Hung Hom Stadium
23 April 2011	Hong Kong	China	Hung Hom Stadium
24 April 2011	Hong Kong	China	Hung Hom Stadium
25 April 2011	Hong Kong	China	Hung Hom Stadium
28 April 2011	Hong Kong	China	Hung Hom Stadium
29 April 2011	Hong Kong	China	Hung Hom Stadium
30 April 2011	Hong Kong	China	Hung Hom Stadium
1 May 2011	Hong Kong	China	Hung Hom Stadium
2 May 2011	Hong Kong	China	Hung Hom Stadium
6 May 2011	Hong Kong	China	Hung Hom Stadium
7 May 2011	Hong Kong	China	Hung Hom Stadium
8 May 2011	Hong Kong	China	Hung Hom Stadium
9 May 2011	Hong Kong	China	Hung Hom Stadium
10 May 2011	Hong Kong	China	Hung Hom Stadium
20 May 2011	Nanjing	China	Wutaishan Sports Center
22 May 2011	Changzhou	China	Changzhou Olympic Sports Center Stadium
27 May 2011	Zhengzhou	China	Henan Sports Center
29 May 2011	Hefei	China	Hefei Olympic Sports Center Stadium
3 June 2011	Mianyang	China	Mianyang Nanhe Sports Center
5 June 2011	Qingdao	China	Conson Gymnasium
10 June 2011	Zigong	China	Zigong Nanhu Stadium
12 June 2011	Dalian	China	Dalian Jinzhou Stadium
17 June 2011	Kunming	China	Kunming Tuodong Stadium
19 June 2011	Shenyang	China	Shenyang Olympic Sports Center
26 June 2011	Harbin	China	HICEC Stadium
1 July 2011	Liuzhou	China	Liuzhou Sports Center Stadium
3 July 2011	Changchun	China	Changchun Nanling Stadium
8 July 2011	Nanning	China	Guangxi Sports Center Stadium
18 August 2011	Taipei	Taiwan	Taipei Arena
19 August 2011	Taipei	Taiwan	Taipei Arena
20 August 2011	Taipei	Taiwan	Taipei Arena
21 August 2011	Taipei	Taiwan	Taipei Arena
26 August 2011	Singapore		Singapore Indoor Stadium
27 August 2011	Singapore		Singapore Indoor Stadium
28 August 2011	Singapore		Singapore Indoor Stadium
29 August 2011	Singapore		Singapore Indoor Stadium
30 August 2011	Singapore		Singapore Indoor Stadium
3 September 2011	Hohhot	China	New Stadium in Hohhot
9 September 2011	Changsha	China	Helong Sports Center Stadium
11 September 2011	Baotou	China	Baotou Olympic Sports Center
16 September 2011	Yichun	China	Yichun Sports Center
18 September 2011	Ordos	China	Tiexi District NaGonal Fitness Center Gym
22 September 2011	Wuhan	China	Wuhan Zhuankou Sports Center Stadium
25 September 2011	Xi’an	China	Shaanxi Stadium
1 October 2011	Sydney	Australia	Sydney Entertainment Centre
4 October 2011	Melbourne	Australia	Hisense Arena
8 October 2011	Yinchuan	China	Ningxia Stadium
14 October 2011	Chengdu	China	Chengdu Sports Center
16 October 2011	Tianjin	China	Tianjin Olympic Center Stadium
21 October 2011	Yibin	China	Yibin Sports Center South Bank Stadium
23 October 2011	Shijiazhuang	China	Yutong Sports Center
28 October 2011	Guiyang	China	Guiyang Olympic Sports Center
30 October 2011	Zhuhai	China	Zhuhai Sports Center
4 November 2011	Panzhihua	China	Panzhihua Sports Center
6 November 2011	Nanchang	China	Nanchang Bayi Stadium
11 November 2011	Dazhou	China	Dazhou Sports Center
13 November 2011	Guilin	China	Guilin Sports Center
18 November 2011	Yichang	China	Yichang Stadium
20 November 2011	Foshan	China	Foshan Century Lotus Sports Center
25 November 2011	Huizhou	China	Huizhou Olympic Stadium
26 November 2011	Dongguan	China	Dongguan Sports Center Stadium
2 December 2011	Zhaoqing	China	Zhaoqing Stadium
3 December 2011	Zhongshan	China	Zhongshan Xingzhong Stadium
8 December 2011	Kuala Lumpur	Malaysia	Bukit Jalil National Stadium
9 December 2011	Kuala Lumpur	Malaysia	Bukit Jalil National Stadium
10 December 2011	Kuala Lumpur	Malaysia	Bukit Jalil National Stadium
11 December 2011	Kuala Lumpur	Malaysia	Bukit Jalil National Stadium
29 December 2011	Macau	China	Cotai Arena
30 December 2011	Macau	China	Cotai Arena
31 December 2011	Macau	China	Cotai Arena
1 January 2012	Macau	China	Cotai Arena
13 January 2012	Vancouver	Canada	Rogers Arena
16 January 2012	Toronto	Canada	Air Canada Centre
10 February 2012	Kaohsiung	Taiwan	Kaohsiung Arena
11 February 2012	Kaohsiung	Taiwan	Kaohsiung Arena
17 February 2012	Zhanjiang	China	Zhanjiang Sports Center Stadium
19 February 2012	Nanning	China	Guangxi Sports Center
24 February 2012	Guangzhou	China	Tianhe Stadium
25 February 2012	Guangzhou	China	Tianhe Stadium
2 March 2012	Shenzhen	China	Shenzhen Bay Sports Center
4 March 2012	Pugan	China	Pugan Sports Center Stadium
10 March 2012	Hangzhou	China	Huanglong Stadium
11 March 2012	Jiaxing	China	Jiaxing Stadium
16 March 2012	Lishui	China	Lishui Sports Center Stadium
18 March 2012	Ningbo	China	Ningbo Fubon Stadium
23 March 2012	Shanghai	China	Shanghai Stadium
24 March 2012	Shanghai	China	Shanghai Stadium
25 March 2012	Wuxi	China	Wuxi Sports Center
30 March 2012	Zhuzhou	China	Zhuzhou Stadium
1 April 2012	Hefei	China	Hefei Olympic Sports Center
13 April 2012	Zunyi	China	Zunyi Huichuan Stadium
15 April 2012	Cixi	China	Cixi Sports Center Stadium
20 April 2012	Chongqing	China	Chongqing Olympic Sports Center
22 April 2012	Luoyang	China	Luoyang New District Stadium
27 April 2012	Nanchong	China	Nanchong Stadium
29 April 2012	Jinan	China	Jinan Olympic Sports Center Stadium
4 May 2012	Chengdu	China	Chengdu Sports Center
6 May 2012	Beijing	China	Beijing Workers Stadium
12 May 2012	Kuala Lumpur	Malaysia	Merdeka Stadium
18 May 2012	Hong Kong	China	AsiaWorld–Arena
19 May 2012	Hong Kong	China	AsiaWorld–Arena
20 May 2012	Hong Kong	China	AsiaWorld–Arena
22 May 2012	Hong Kong	China	AsiaWorld–Arena
23 May 2012	Hong Kong	China	AsiaWorld–Arena
25 May 2012	Hong Kong	China	AsiaWorld–Arena
26 May 2012	Hong Kong	China	AsiaWorld–Arena
27 May 2012	Hong Kong	China	AsiaWorld–Arena
29 May 2012	Hong Kong	China	AsiaWorld–Arena
30 May 2012	Hong Kong	China	AsiaWorld–Arena
