= Life Is But a Dream =

Life Is But a Dream can refer to:

- Life Is But a Dream (film), 2013 autobiographical film about Beyoncé
- Life Is But a Dream..., 2023 album by Avenged Sevenfold
- "Life is but a dream", lyrics in the nursery rhyme "Row, Row, Row Your Boat"
