= Life Is Like a Dream =

Studio album by Jackie Cheung
- Released: April 20, 2004
- Recorded: 2003–2004
- Genre: Cantonese pop, Chinese pop
- Language: Cantonese
- Label: IOI Limited; What's the Music International Incorporated
- Producer: Jackie Cheung, Michael Au

Jackie Cheung chronology
He Is There (2002)	Life Is Like a Dream (2004)	Black & White (2004)

Life Is Like a Dream is an album by Hong Kong singer Jacky Cheung, released on April 20, 2004. It was produced by Cheung and Michael Au. Two versions were produced: a Hong Kong version and a Mainland version.

== Background and composition ==
The tracks were all composed by Jacky Cheung. The song, "Tell You Everything", was written for his wife, May Lo, to express his love for her. "To Friends" was written for his late friends Leslie Cheung, Anita Mui, and Blackie Ko, all of whom died in 2003. "Lullaby" was written for his daughter. His voice indicates his deep love for his daughter when singing.

Cheung composed the melody for all the songs, and wrote the lyrics for three of them. The album was certified Double Platinum, selling over 150 thousands copies.

Cheung's considers the album one of his favorites.

== Track listing ==
All music is composed by Jacky Cheung (The track "I Would Rather Do It Wrongly" in it was composed together with Michael Au)

No.	Title	Lyrics	Implications	Length
1.	"A Story About Bravery"	Joe Lei	Sacrifice
2.	"To be alcoholic "	Jackie Cheung	Once before
3.	"Mania"	Wyman Wong	Experience
4.	"Life Is Like A Dream"	Albert Leung	Comprehension
5.	"An Unhurried Manner"	Albert Leung	Penetration
6.	"She"	Jacky Cheung	Calm Down
7.	"To Friends"	Ivy Koo	Reminisce
8.	"I would rather do it wrongly"	Jacky Cheung; Keith Chan Siu-kei	Difference
9.	"Tell You Everything"	Jacky Cheung	Husband
10.	"Lullaby"	Ivy Koo	Father

== Awards ==
Jacky Cheung, who was taking a break from music awards, was honored a few new awards after releasing this album which includes the tracks he composed and wrote. He was awarded the Singer-Songwriter Gold Award in Ultimate Song Chart Awards. There were three tracks in the album winning the championship in Hong Kong. "Tell You Everything" took the championship of Four Stations Joint Music Awards. The "Most Outstanding Album" also went to the album Life Is Like A Dream.

=== Ultimate song chart awards ===
- Ultimate Top 10 Tell You Everything
- 2004 Ultimate Singer-Songwriter Gold Award

=== Ming Pao weekly power artist awards ===
- "Most Outstanding Album"—Life is Like a Dream
