= The Goodbye Kiss (album) =

Studio album by Jacky Cheung
- Released: 5 March 1993
- Recorded: 1992–1993
- Genre: Mandopop
- Length: 47:56
- Language: Mandarin
- Label: PolyGram
- Producer: Eddie Huang; Jamie Xue

Jacky Cheung chronology
Love Fire Flower (1992)	The Goodbye Kiss (1993)	Blessing (1993)

The Goodbye Kiss (Chinese: 吻別; pinyin: Wěnbié) is the fifth Mandarin studio album by Hong Kong recording artist Jacky Cheung. It was released through PolyGram Records Hong Kong on 5 March 1993.

== Commercial performance ==
The Mandopop album was a great success in the Greater China region. The album sold over 5 million copies in 1993 throughout Asia, including 1,360,000 copies in Taiwan alone, making it one of Cheung's three million-selling records in the country and remains the second best-selling album of all time in Taiwan. In early 1994, Hong Kong's popular music reached a historic high point in Mainland China, the album sold 2.2 million legitimate copies there, despite significant levels of piracy, and the influence of the album in China was higher than previous popular songs.

The album was also highly successful in Southeast Asia; in Singapore, the album sold 200,000 copies and remains the second best-selling album in the region, after Michael Jackson's Dangerous (1991). In Malaysia, the album recorded sales of around 500,000 copies, and remains the best-selling Mandarin album in the country.

== Covers ==
In 2003, Michael Learns to Rock covered the title track, "Goodbye Kiss" in English and released it as "Take Me to Your Heart". The song has also been covered by many Asian musicians, such as Jay Chou, Anson Hu, Justin Lo, and others. A band in Myanmar Iron Cross has also made a cover of the title track as well known as ကြိုးမဲ့စွန် (Stringless Kite)

== Accolades ==
In 2008, the Chinese Musicians Exchange Association ranked The Goodbye Kiss number 19 in their list of the 100 Greatest Taiwanese Pop Music Albums from 1975 to 1993.

Awards for "The Goodbye Kiss"
Year	Award	Category	Result
1993	Jade Solid Gold Awards	Gold Award for Most Popular Mandarin Song	Won
1993	Jade Solid Gold Awards	Best Lyric Award	Won
1993	RTHK Top 10 Gold Songs Awards	IFPI International Song Award	Won
1993	Golden Melody Awards	Best Song of the Year	Won
1993	Golden Melody Awards	Best Arranger Award	Won
1993	Singapore Hit Awards	Most Popular Album	Won
1993	Singapore Hit Awards	Most Popular Song	Won
1994	Singapore Hit Awards	Best Golden Melody Award	Won

== Track listing ==
The Goodbye Kiss track listing
No.	Title	Lyrics	Music	Length
1.	"Goodbye Kiss" (吻別; Wenbie)	He Qihong	Yi Wenqi	5:06
2.	"Love Snare" (情網; Qingwang)	Mark Liu	Sky Wu	4:05
3.	"Linda"	He Qihong	Keiji Katayama	4:26
4.	"There's You Along the Road" (一路上有你; Yilu shang you ni)	Xie Mingxun	Keiji Katayama	4:47
5.	"Your Love" (你給我的愛最多; Ni gei wode ai zui duo)	Huang Qingyuan	Kome Kome Club	5:20
6.	"Love You More Each Day" (每天愛你多一些; Meitian ai ni duo yixie)	Daryl Yao	Keisuke Kuwata	4:41
7.	"Trust Her, Care for Her" (相信她，關心她; Xiangxin ta, guanxin ta)	Chen Re-long	Huang Qingyuan	4:46
8.	"People in Love Are the Same" (戀愛的人都一樣; Lian ai de ren dou yiyang)	He Qihong	Shōgo Hamada	4:35
9.	"Love Sunshine" (擁抱陽光; Yongbao yangguang)	He Qihong	Kan	3:32
10.	"Autumn" (秋意濃; Qiu yi nong)	Daryl Yao	Kōji Tamaki	6:38
Total length:				47:56

== Sales and certifications ==
Region	Certification	Certified units/sales
China	—	4,000,000
Malaysia	—	500,000
Singapore	—	200,000
Taiwan (RIT)	12× Platinum	1,360,000
