= Jacky Cheung 60+ Concert Tour =

2023–25 concert tour by Jacky Cheung

- Tour by Jacky Cheung
- Promotional poster for the tour
- Location: Asia
- Start date: June 9, 2023
- End date: January 24, 2026
- No. of shows: 324

Jacky Cheung concert chronology
- A Classic Tour (2016–2019); Jacky Cheung 60+ Concert Tour (2023–2026)

The Jacky Cheung 60+ Concert Tour (Chinese: 張學友60+巡迴演唱會) was a concert tour by Hong Kong recording artist Jacky Cheung. The world tour opened on June 9, 2023, at the Cotai Arena in Macau and continued into 2025 with shows in Hong Kong, Taiwan and Malaysia.

The theme of Cheung's 60+ show is water; embracing his 60s, Cheung is being as fluid as water which, no matter how tough the terrain, always find its way through and continues to flow.

Cheung's concert in Haikou was the 218th show of the Jacky Cheung 60+ Tour and his 1,000th concert performance across 10 tours. Universal Music Greater China held a celebration for the occasion, presenting Cheung with a 3-meter long scroll painting of his journey, illustrating the stage design, lighting and look of each of his tours, set against a backdrop of fans holding light signs.

== Production ==
=== Background ===
Goh Kheng Long is the music director and pianist leading an orchestra of 53 musicians playing new orchestral arrangements. The stage design and production is elaborate with the 53 musicians, including string and horn section, appearing on a four-storey structure. Visuals appear on massive LED screens. The show features a dance troupe of 20 members, along with ballet soloists.

Cheung sings newer songs and classic hits from his repertoire in Mandarin and Cantonese including "Three Days Two Nights", "Love Is Eternal", "Breaking Up on Rainy Days", "Forever with You", "Sleep When Sunrise", and "Another 10 Years" and displays his dancing finesse with complex choreographed numbers on "Ooh La La", "Road Hero", and "Double Trouble" and others.

=== Ticket sales ===
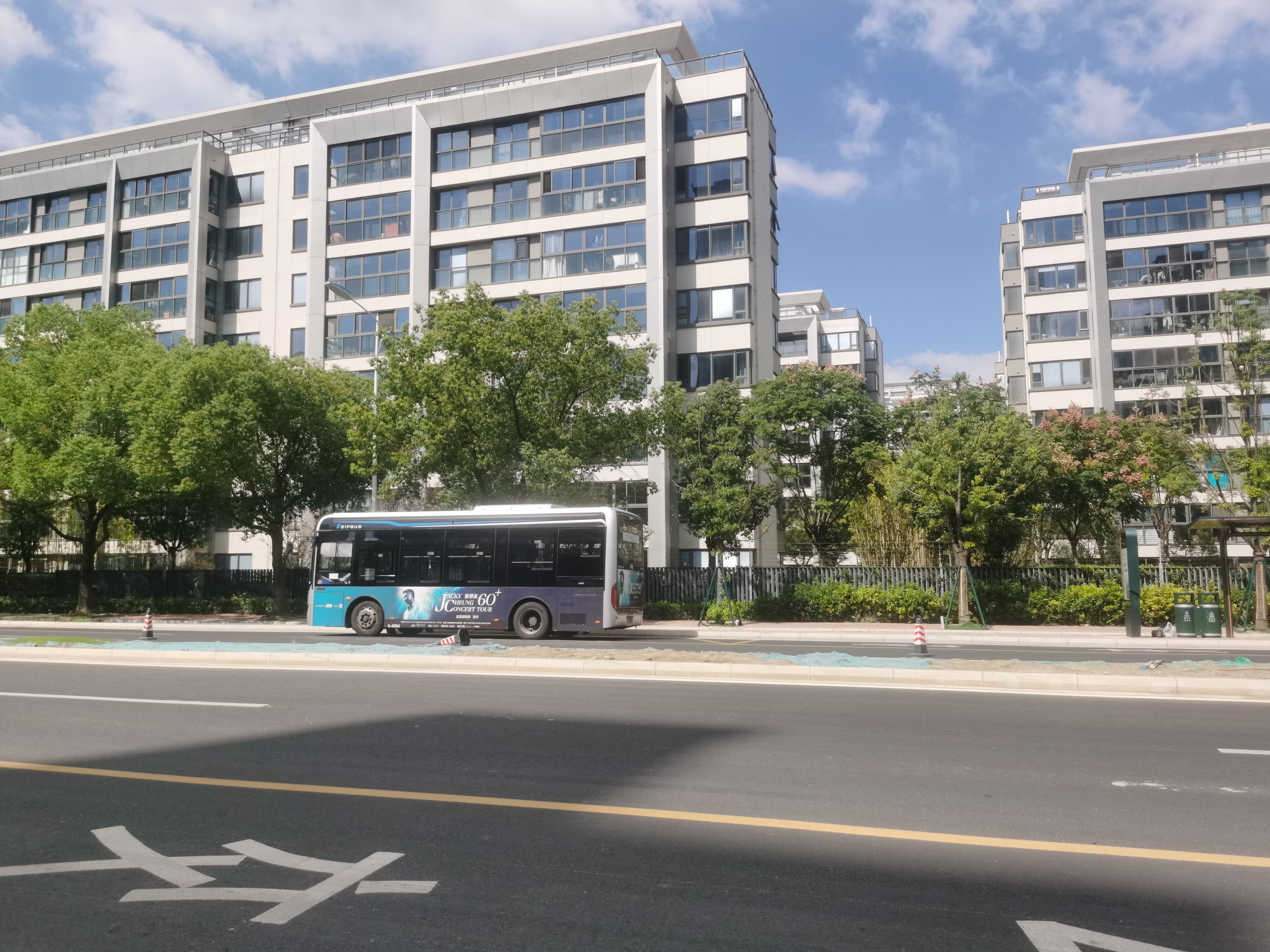
A bus with the concert advertisement in Suzhou, China

After the original six shows scheduled at The Venetian Macao Cotai Arena on the first leg of the FWD Insurance 10th Anniversary Presents: Jacky Cheung 60+ Concert Tour quickly sold out, six more shows were added. Cheung broke records performing 12 shows at The Venetian Macao and selling more than 109,000 tickets.

Cheung broke records again on the second leg of the tour, after adding two concert performances at the Singapore Indoor Stadium, totaling 11 shows, more than any previous artist in a single leg of a concert tour in Singapore. Originally, 18 shows scheduled at The Hong Kong Coliseum from December 10 to January 4, 2024, quickly sold out. 6 additional shows were added from January 6 to 13, 2024.

== Notes ==
=== August 12, 2023 (Day 2 Malaysia) ===
- 30 minutes before the concert, Cheung experienced a sudden Ménière's attack which included symptoms of dizziness. This caused the start time of his performance to start 8 minutes late. During the talking segment of that day's concert, he revealed that he has had this disease since he was young, with attacks happening around once every year; however, he stated that in his 38-year career performing, never has he had an attack before/during a concert.

=== August 13, 2023 (Day 3 Malaysia) ===
- According to Cheung, at around 7 pm that day, he had informed the Organizer that he had symptoms of intense dizziness; however, due to time, the concert that day continued as planned. Cheung made modified changes to his concert including sitting down on the prop car during his 2nd song "Road Heroes". He also acknowledged during the talk segment that the symptoms of his attack was even worse than on August 12, and that he had to close his eyes most of the time to avoid feeling dizzy. During the song "Forever with You", Cheung collapsed due to a weakened left leg. However, he quickly stood back up and continued singing.

=== March 7, 2024 (Cancellation Announcement Regarding Three Performances in the Shanghai Station) ===
- On March 7, 2024, a notice of cancellation was released citing “Mr. Jacky Cheung was unwell and required rest after medical treatment. Taking into account the physical condition of the artists and the premise of public safety, in order to ensure the overall high-level presentation of the performance, we regret to inform you that the three performances on March 8th, 9th, and 10th of Jacky Cheung's 60+ Tour Concert has been cancelled. We deeply apologize for the inconvenience this has caused to all audiences. The relevant ticketing solutions will be announced before 22:00 on March 10 after fully soliciting opinions from all parties. Thank you again for your understanding and understanding.”
- On March 8, a statement by Jacky Cheung was released through his record company, Universal Music, addressing the cancellation of the 3 performances as a result of Covid-19. He stated that unlike the rumours spread, he is currently self-isolating at home and resting.

== Tour dates ==
List of 2023 tour dates
Date (2023)	City	Country	Venue	Attendance
June 9	Macau		Cotai Arena	109,000
June 10	Macau		Cotai Arena	109,000
June 11	Macau		Cotai Arena	109,000
June 16	Macau		Cotai Arena	109,000
June 17	Macau		Cotai Arena	109,000
June 18	Macau		Cotai Arena	109,000
June 23	Macau		Cotai Arena	109,000
June 24	Macau		Cotai Arena	109,000
June 25	Macau		Cotai Arena	109,000
June 30	Macau		Cotai Arena	109,000
July 1	Macau		Cotai Arena	109,000
July 2	Macau		Cotai Arena	109,000
July 14	Singapore		Singapore Indoor Stadium	88,000
July 15	Singapore		Singapore Indoor Stadium	88,000
July 16	Singapore		Singapore Indoor Stadium	88,000
July 21	Singapore		Singapore Indoor Stadium	88,000
July 22	Singapore		Singapore Indoor Stadium	88,000
July 23	Singapore		Singapore Indoor Stadium	88,000
July 28	Singapore		Singapore Indoor Stadium	88,000
July 29	Singapore		Singapore Indoor Stadium	88,000
July 30	Singapore		Singapore Indoor Stadium	88,000
August 3	Singapore		Singapore Indoor Stadium	88,000
August 4	Singapore		Singapore Indoor Stadium	88,000
August 11	Kuala Lumpur	Malaysia	Axiata Arena	—
August 12	Kuala Lumpur	Malaysia	Axiata Arena	—
August 13	Kuala Lumpur	Malaysia	Axiata Arena	—
August 18	Kuala Lumpur	Malaysia	Axiata Arena	—
August 19	Kuala Lumpur	Malaysia	Axiata Arena	—
August 20	Kuala Lumpur	Malaysia	Axiata Arena	—
September 8	Wuhan	China	Optics Valley International Tennis Center	—
September 9	Wuhan	China	Optics Valley International Tennis Center	—
September 10	Wuhan	China	Optics Valley International Tennis Center	—
September 15	Wuhan	China	Optics Valley International Tennis Center	—
September 16	Wuhan	China	Optics Valley International Tennis Center	—
September 17	Wuhan	China	Optics Valley International Tennis Center	—
September 22	Guangzhou	China	Guangzhou International Sports Arena	120,000
September 23	Guangzhou	China	Guangzhou International Sports Arena	120,000
September 24	Guangzhou	China	Guangzhou International Sports Arena	120,000
September 29	Guangzhou	China	Guangzhou International Sports Arena	120,000
September 30	Guangzhou	China	Guangzhou International Sports Arena	120,000
October 7	Guangzhou	China	Guangzhou International Sports Arena	120,000
October 8	Guangzhou	China	Guangzhou International Sports Arena	120,000
October 13	Guangzhou	China	Guangzhou International Sports Arena	120,000
October 14	Guangzhou	China	Guangzhou International Sports Arena	120,000
October 15	Guangzhou	China	Guangzhou International Sports Arena	120,000
October 20	Chengdu	China	Phoenix Mountain Sports Park Gymnasium	121,000
October 21	Chengdu	China	Phoenix Mountain Sports Park Gymnasium	121,000
October 22	Chengdu	China	Phoenix Mountain Sports Park Gymnasium	121,000
October 27	Chengdu	China	Phoenix Mountain Sports Park Gymnasium	121,000
October 28	Chengdu	China	Phoenix Mountain Sports Park Gymnasium	121,000
October 29	Chengdu	China	Phoenix Mountain Sports Park Gymnasium	121,000
November 3	Chengdu	China	Phoenix Mountain Sports Park Gymnasium	121,000
November 4	Chengdu	China	Phoenix Mountain Sports Park Gymnasium	121,000
November 5	Chengdu	China	Phoenix Mountain Sports Park Gymnasium	121,000
November 10	Ningbo	China	Ningbo Olympic Sports Center	—
November 11	Ningbo	China	Ningbo Olympic Sports Center	—
November 12	Ningbo	China	Ningbo Olympic Sports Center	—
November 17	Ningbo	China	Ningbo Olympic Sports Center	—
November 18	Ningbo	China	Ningbo Olympic Sports Center	—
November 19	Ningbo	China	Ningbo Olympic Sports Center	—
November 24	Nanjing	China	Nanjing Youth Olympics Sports Park	—
November 25	Nanjing	China	Nanjing Youth Olympics Sports Park	—
November 26	Nanjing	China	Nanjing Youth Olympics Sports Park	—
December 1	Nanjing	China	Nanjing Youth Olympics Sports Park	—
December 2	Nanjing	China	Nanjing Youth Olympics Sports Park	—
December 3	Nanjing	China	Nanjing Youth Olympics Sports Park	—
December 10	Hong Kong		Hong Kong Coliseum	—
December 11	Hong Kong		Hong Kong Coliseum	—
December 13	Hong Kong		Hong Kong Coliseum	—
December 14	Hong Kong		Hong Kong Coliseum	—
December 16	Hong Kong		Hong Kong Coliseum	—
December 17	Hong Kong		Hong Kong Coliseum	—
December 19	Hong Kong		Hong Kong Coliseum	—
December 20	Hong Kong		Hong Kong Coliseum	—
December 22	Hong Kong		Hong Kong Coliseum	—
December 23	Hong Kong		Hong Kong Coliseum	—
December 25	Hong Kong		Hong Kong Coliseum	—
December 26	Hong Kong		Hong Kong Coliseum	—
December 28	Hong Kong		Hong Kong Coliseum	—
December 29	Hong Kong		Hong Kong Coliseum	—
December 31	Hong Kong		Hong Kong Coliseum	—

List of 2024 tour dates
Date (2024)	City	Country	Venue	Attendance
January 1	Hong Kong		Hong Kong Coliseum	—
January 3	Hong Kong		Hong Kong Coliseum	—
January 4	Hong Kong		Hong Kong Coliseum	—
January 6	Hong Kong		Hong Kong Coliseum	—
January 7	Hong Kong		Hong Kong Coliseum	—
January 9	Hong Kong		Hong Kong Coliseum	—
January 10	Hong Kong		Hong Kong Coliseum	—
January 12	Hong Kong		Hong Kong Coliseum	—
January 13	Hong Kong		Hong Kong Coliseum	—
January 19	Quanzhou	China	Jinjiang Second Sports Center Gymnasium	—
January 20	Quanzhou	China	Jinjiang Second Sports Center Gymnasium	—
January 21	Quanzhou	China	Jinjiang Second Sports Center Gymnasium	—
January 26	Quanzhou	China	Jinjiang Second Sports Center Gymnasium	—
January 27	Quanzhou	China	Jinjiang Second Sports Center Gymnasium	—
January 28	Quanzhou	China	Jinjiang Second Sports Center Gymnasium	—
February 23	Shanghai	China	Shanghai Oriental Sports Center	—
February 24	Shanghai	China	Shanghai Oriental Sports Center	—
February 25	Shanghai	China	Shanghai Oriental Sports Center	—
March 1	Shanghai	China	Shanghai Oriental Sports Center	—
March 2	Shanghai	China	Shanghai Oriental Sports Center	—
March 3	Shanghai	China	Shanghai Oriental Sports Center	—
March 15	Shanghai	China	Shanghai Oriental Sports Center	—
March 16	Shanghai	China	Shanghai Oriental Sports Center	—
March 17	Shanghai	China	Shanghai Oriental Sports Center	—
March 22	Shanghai	China	Shanghai Oriental Sports Center	—
March 23	Shanghai	China	Shanghai Oriental Sports Center	—
March 24	Shanghai	China	Shanghai Oriental Sports Center	—
March 29	Beijing	China	Wukesong Arena	—
March 30	Beijing	China	Wukesong Arena	—
March 31	Beijing	China	Wukesong Arena	—
April 5	Beijing	China	Wukesong Arena	—
April 6	Beijing	China	Wukesong Arena	—
April 7	Beijing	China	Wukesong Arena	—
April 12	Beijing	China	Wukesong Arena	—
April 13	Beijing	China	Wukesong Arena	—
April 14	Beijing	China	Wukesong Arena	—
April 19	Beijing	China	Wukesong Arena	—
April 20	Beijing	China	Wukesong Arena	—
April 21	Beijing	China	Wukesong Arena	—
April 26	Xiamen	China	Xiamen Sports Center Stadium	—
April 27	Xiamen	China	Xiamen Sports Center Stadium	—
April 28	Xiamen	China	Xiamen Sports Center Stadium	—
May 3	Xiamen	China	Xiamen Sports Center Stadium	—
May 4	Xiamen	China	Xiamen Sports Center Stadium	—
May 5	Xiamen	China	Xiamen Sports Center Stadium	—
May 10	Chongqing	China	Huaxi Live Yudong	110,000
May 11	Chongqing	China	Huaxi Live Yudong	110,000
May 12	Chongqing	China	Huaxi Live Yudong	110,000
May 17	Chongqing	China	Huaxi Live Yudong	110,000
May 18	Chongqing	China	Huaxi Live Yudong	110,000
May 19	Chongqing	China	Huaxi Live Yudong	110,000
May 24	Chongqing	China	Huaxi Live Yudong	110,000
May 25	Chongqing	China	Huaxi Live Yudong	110,000
May 26	Chongqing	China	Huaxi Live Yudong	110,000
May 31	Taipei	Taiwan	Taipei Arena	90,000
June 1	Taipei	Taiwan	Taipei Arena	90,000
June 2	Taipei	Taiwan	Taipei Arena	90,000
June 14	Taipei	Taiwan	Taipei Arena	90,000
June 15	Taipei	Taiwan	Taipei Arena	90,000
June 16	Taipei	Taiwan	Taipei Arena	90,000
June 21	Zhengzhou	China	Zhengzhou Olympic Sports Center	—
June 22	Zhengzhou	China	Zhengzhou Olympic Sports Center	—
June 23	Zhengzhou	China	Zhengzhou Olympic Sports Center	—
June 28	Zhengzhou	China	Zhengzhou Olympic Sports Center	—
June 29	Zhengzhou	China	Zhengzhou Olympic Sports Center	—
June 30	Zhengzhou	China	Zhengzhou Olympic Sports Center	—
July 12	Hangzhou	China	Hangzhou Olympic Sports Center	—
July 13	Hangzhou	China	Hangzhou Olympic Sports Center	—
July 14	Hangzhou	China	Hangzhou Olympic Sports Center	—
July 19	Hangzhou	China	Hangzhou Olympic Sports Center	—
July 20	Hangzhou	China	Hangzhou Olympic Sports Center	—
July 21	Hangzhou	China	Hangzhou Olympic Sports Center	—
August 2	Hangzhou	China	Hangzhou Olympic Sports Center	—
August 3	Hangzhou	China	Hangzhou Olympic Sports Center	—
August 4	Hangzhou	China	Hangzhou Olympic Sports Center	—
August 9	Shenzhen	China	Shenzhen Universiade Sports Centre	—
August 10	Shenzhen	China	Shenzhen Universiade Sports Centre	—
August 11	Shenzhen	China	Shenzhen Universiade Sports Centre	—
August 16	Shenzhen	China	Shenzhen Universiade Sports Centre	—
August 17	Shenzhen	China	Shenzhen Universiade Sports Centre	—
August 18	Shenzhen	China	Shenzhen Universiade Sports Centre	—
August 23	Shenzhen	China	Shenzhen Universiade Sports Centre	—
August 24	Shenzhen	China	Shenzhen Universiade Sports Centre	—
August 25	Shenzhen	China	Shenzhen Universiade Sports Centre	—
September 6	Xi'an	China	Xi'an Olympic Sports Center	—
September 7	Xi'an	China	Xi'an Olympic Sports Center	—
September 8	Xi'an	China	Xi'an Olympic Sports Center	—
September 13	Xi'an	China	Xi'an Olympic Sports Center	—
September 14	Xi'an	China	Xi'an Olympic Sports Center	—
September 15	Xi'an	China	Xi'an Olympic Sports Center	—
September 20	Xi'an	China	Xi'an Olympic Sports Center	—
September 21	Xi'an	China	Xi'an Olympic Sports Center	—
September 22	Xi'an	China	Xi'an Olympic Sports Center	—
September 27	Jinan	China	Jinan Olympic Sports Center	—
September 28	Jinan	China	Jinan Olympic Sports Center	—
September 29	Jinan	China	Jinan Olympic Sports Center	—
October 4	Jinan	China	Jinan Olympic Sports Center	—
October 5	Jinan	China	Jinan Olympic Sports Center	—
October 6	Jinan	China	Jinan Olympic Sports Center	—
October 11	Shanghai	China	Shanghai Oriental Sports Center	—
October 12	Shanghai	China	Shanghai Oriental Sports Center	—
October 13	Shanghai	China	Shanghai Oriental Sports Center	—
October 18	Shanghai	China	Shanghai Oriental Sports Center	—
October 19	Shanghai	China	Shanghai Oriental Sports Center	—
October 20	Shanghai	China	Shanghai Oriental Sports Center	—
November 1	Foshan	China	GBA International Sports & Cultural Center	—
November 2	Foshan	China	GBA International Sports & Cultural Center	—
November 3	Foshan	China	GBA International Sports & Cultural Center	—
November 8	Foshan	China	GBA International Sports & Cultural Center	—
November 9	Foshan	China	GBA International Sports & Cultural Center	—
November 10	Foshan	China	GBA International Sports & Cultural Center	—
November 22	Dalian	China	Dalian Sports Center Gymnasium	—
November 23	Dalian	China	Dalian Sports Center Gymnasium	—
November 24	Dalian	China	Dalian Sports Center Gymnasium	—
November 29	Qingdao	China	Qingdao Citizen Fitness Center	—
November 30	Qingdao	China	Qingdao Citizen Fitness Center	—
December 1	Qingdao	China	Qingdao Citizen Fitness Center	—
December 14	Suzhou	China	Suzhou Olympic Sports Center Gymnasium	—
December 15	Suzhou	China	Suzhou Olympic Sports Center Gymnasium	—
December 20	Suzhou	China	Suzhou Olympic Sports Center Gymnasium	—
December 21	Suzhou	China	Suzhou Olympic Sports Center Gymnasium	—
December 22	Suzhou	China	Suzhou Olympic Sports Center Gymnasium	—
December 27	Suzhou	China	Suzhou Olympic Sports Center Gymnasium	—
December 28	Suzhou	China	Suzhou Olympic Sports Center Gymnasium	—
December 29	Suzhou	China	Suzhou Olympic Sports Center Gymnasium	—

List of 2025 tour dates
Date (2025)	City	Country	Venue	Attendance
January 10	Nanchang	China	Nanchang International Sports Center Gymnasium	—
January 11	Nanchang	China	Nanchang International Sports Center Gymnasium	—
January 12	Nanchang	China	Nanchang International Sports Center Gymnasium	—
January 17	Nanchang	China	Nanchang International Sports Center Gymnasium	—
January 18	Nanchang	China	Nanchang International Sports Center Gymnasium	—
January 19	Nanchang	China	Nanchang International Sports Center Gymnasium	—
February 7	Hangzhou	China	Hangzhou Olympic Sports Center Gymnasium	—
February 8	Hangzhou	China	Hangzhou Olympic Sports Center Gymnasium	—
February 9	Hangzhou	China	Hangzhou Olympic Sports Center Gymnasium	—
February 14	Hangzhou	China	Hangzhou Olympic Sports Center Gymnasium	—
February 15	Hangzhou	China	Hangzhou Olympic Sports Center Gymnasium	—
February 16	Hangzhou	China	Hangzhou Olympic Sports Center Gymnasium	—
February 21	Haikou	China	Wuyuanhe Stadium	—
February 22	Haikou	China	Wuyuanhe Stadium	—
February 23	Haikou	China	Wuyuanhe Stadium	—
February 28	Guangzhou	China	Guangzhou Baoneng Qoros Cultural Center	—
March 1	Guangzhou	China	Guangzhou Baoneng Qoros Cultural Center	—
March 2	Guangzhou	China	Guangzhou Baoneng Qoros Cultural Center	—
March 7	Guangzhou	China	Guangzhou Baoneng Qoros Cultural Center	—
March 8	Guangzhou	China	Guangzhou Baoneng Qoros Cultural Center	—
March 9	Guangzhou	China	Guangzhou Baoneng Qoros Cultural Center	—
March 14	Guangzhou	China	Guangzhou Baoneng Qoros Cultural Center	—
March 15	Guangzhou	China	Guangzhou Baoneng Qoros Cultural Center	—
March 16	Guangzhou	China	Guangzhou Baoneng Qoros Cultural Center	—
March 28	Kaohsiung	Taiwan	Kaohsiung Arena	—
March 29	Kaohsiung	Taiwan	Kaohsiung Arena	—
March 30	Kaohsiung	Taiwan	Kaohsiung Arena	—
April 4	Taipei	Taiwan	Taipei Arena	—
April 5	Taipei	Taiwan	Taipei Arena	—
April 6	Taipei	Taiwan	Taipei Arena	—
April 11	Taipei	Taiwan	Taipei Arena	—
April 12	Taipei	Taiwan	Taipei Arena	—
April 13	Taipei	Taiwan	Taipei Arena	—
April 18	Taipei	Taiwan	Taipei Arena	—
April 19	Taipei	Taiwan	Taipei Arena	—
April 20	Taipei	Taiwan	Taipei Arena	—
June 20	Macau		Galaxy Arena	—
June 21	Macau		Galaxy Arena	—
June 22	Macau		Galaxy Arena	—
June 27	Macau		Galaxy Arena	—
June 28	Macau		Galaxy Arena	—
June 29	Macau		Galaxy Arena	—
July 4	Macau		Galaxy Arena	—
July 5	Macau		Galaxy Arena	—
July 6	Macau		Galaxy Arena	—
July 18	Suzhou	China	Suzhou Olympic Sports Center Gymnasium	—
July 19	Suzhou	China	Suzhou Olympic Sports Center Gymnasium	—
July 20	Suzhou	China	Suzhou Olympic Sports Center Gymnasium	—
August 15	Kuala Lumpur	Malaysia	Axiata Arena	—
August 16	Kuala Lumpur	Malaysia	Axiata Arena	—
August 17	Kuala Lumpur	Malaysia	Axiata Arena	—
August 22	Kuala Lumpur	Malaysia	Axiata Arena	—
August 23	Kuala Lumpur	Malaysia	Axiata Arena	—
August 24	Kuala Lumpur	Malaysia	Axiata Arena	—
August 29	Dongguan	China	Dongguan Sports Center	—
August 30	Dongguan	China	Dongguan Sports Center	—
August 31	Dongguan	China	Dongguan Sports Center	—
September 13	Incheon	South Korea	Inspire Arena	—
September 19	Shanghai	China	Shanghai Oriental Sports Center	—
September 20	Shanghai	China	Shanghai Oriental Sports Center	—
September 21	Shanghai	China	Shanghai Oriental Sports Center	—
September 26	Shanghai	China	Shanghai Oriental Sports Center	—
September 27	Shanghai	China	Shanghai Oriental Sports Center	—
September 28	Shanghai	China	Shanghai Oriental Sports Center	—
October 10	Chengdu	China	Phoenix Mountain Sports Park Gymnasium	—
October 11	Chengdu	China	Phoenix Mountain Sports Park Gymnasium	—
October 12	Chengdu	China	Phoenix Mountain Sports Park Gymnasium	—
October 17	Xiamen	China	Xiamen Sports Center Stadium	—
October 18	Xiamen	China	Xiamen Sports Center Stadium	—
October 19	Xiamen	China	Xiamen Sports Center Stadium	—
October 24	Guangzhou	China	Guangzhou International Sports Arena	—
October 25	Guangzhou	China	Guangzhou International Sports Arena	—
October 26	Guangzhou	China	Guangzhou International Sports Arena	—
October 31	Guangzhou	China	Guangzhou International Sports Arena	—
November 1	Guangzhou	China	Guangzhou International Sports Arena	—
November 7	Zhuji	China	Zhuji Xishi Basketball Center Gymnasium	—
November 8	Zhuji	China	Zhuji Xishi Basketball Center Gymnasium	—
November 9	Zhuji	China	Zhuji Xishi Basketball Center Gymnasium	—
November 21	Singapore		Singapore Indoor Stadium	—
November 22	Singapore		Singapore Indoor Stadium	—
November 23	Singapore		Singapore Indoor Stadium	—
November 28	Singapore		Singapore Indoor Stadium	—
November 29	Singapore		Singapore Indoor Stadium	—
November 30	Singapore		Singapore Indoor Stadium	—
December 23	Hong Kong		Hong Kong Coliseum	—
December 24	Hong Kong		Hong Kong Coliseum	—
December 26	Hong Kong		Hong Kong Coliseum	—
December 27	Hong Kong		Hong Kong Coliseum	—
December 30	Hong Kong		Hong Kong Coliseum	—
December 31	Hong Kong		Hong Kong Coliseum	—

List of 2026 tour dates
Date (2026)	City	Country	Venue	Attendance
January 2	Hong Kong		Hong Kong Coliseum	—
January 3	Hong Kong		Hong Kong Coliseum	—
January 6	Hong Kong		Hong Kong Coliseum	—
January 7	Hong Kong		Hong Kong Coliseum	—
January 9	Hong Kong		Hong Kong Coliseum	—
January 10	Hong Kong		Hong Kong Coliseum	—
January 13	Hong Kong		Hong Kong Coliseum	—
January 14	Hong Kong		Hong Kong Coliseum	—
January 16	Hong Kong		Hong Kong Coliseum	—
January 17	Hong Kong		Hong Kong Coliseum	—
January 20	Hong Kong		Hong Kong Coliseum	—
January 21	Hong Kong		Hong Kong Coliseum	—
January 23	Hong Kong		Hong Kong Coliseum	—
January 24	Hong Kong		Hong Kong Coliseum	—
