= Nantong Stadium =

Sports venue in Nantong, China

Coordinates: 31.968512°N 120.890453°E

- Interactive map of Nantong Stadium
- Full name: Nantong Stadium
- Location: Nantong, China
- Capacity: 22,000

Construction
- Opened: 2010

The Nantong Stadium is a multi-purpose stadium in Nantong, China. It is currently used mostly for football matches. The stadium holds 22,000 spectators. It opened in 2010.
