= Taizhou Sports Center =

Sports venue in Taizhou, Zhejiang, China

Coordinates: 28°38′59″N 121°23′43″E

The Taizhou Sports Centre Stadium (Simplified Chinese: 台州体育中心) is a multi-use stadium in Taizhou, China. It is currently used mostly for football matches. The stadium holds 40,000 people and opened in 2003.
