= Michael Au =

Hong Konger music producer

- 歐丁玉
- Born: 6 November 1957 (age 68); Hong Kong
- Occupation: Music producer
- Known for: Collaboration with Jacky Cheung, Priscilla Chan and Ronald Cheng

Michael Au Ting Yuk (Chinese: 歐丁玉; pinyin: Ōu Dīngyù; born 6 November 1957) is a Hong Kong music producer. Au is Hakka, and his parents originated from Guangdong Province, mainland China. He is well known for his collaboration with Hong Kong singers Jacky Cheung and Priscilla Chan.

Michael started as a music engineer with PolyGram, and eventually participated in the work of record producer.
