= Jacky Cheung =

Hong Kong singer and actor (born 1961)

- 張學友
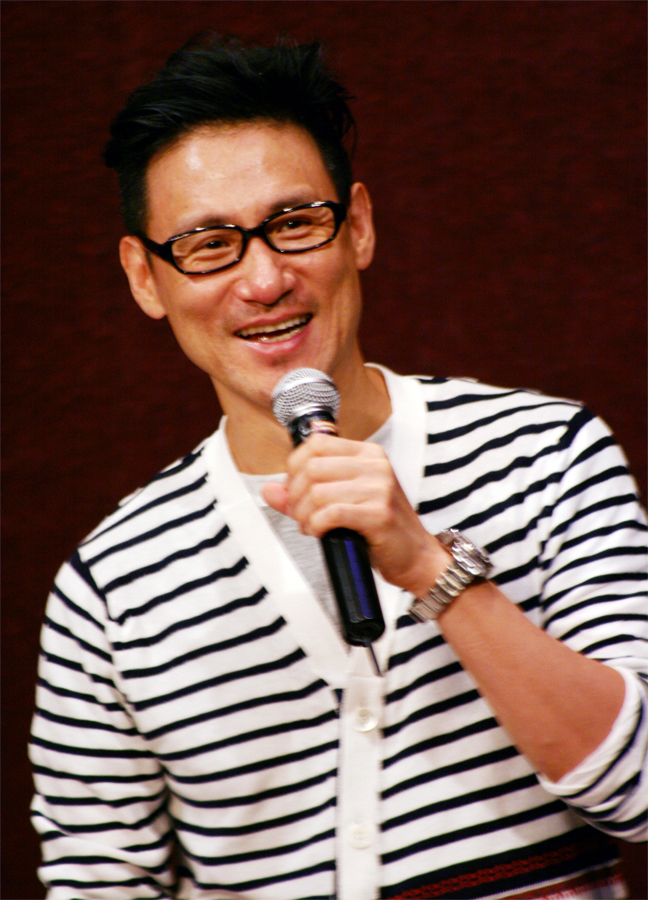
- Cheung in 2012
- Born: Cheung Hok-yau; 10 July 1961 (age 65); Quarry Bay, British Hong Kong
- Occupations: Singer; actor; songwriter
- Years active: 1984–present
- Works: Albums; concerts
- Spouse: May Lo (m. 1996)
- Children: 2
- Musical career
- Also known as: God of Songs, God of Singing
- Origin: Hong Kong
- Genres: Cantopop; Mandopop; operatic pop; adult contemporary; jazz; R&B; Hong Kong English pop
- Instrument: Vocals
- Label: Universal

Chinese name
- Traditional Chinese: 張學友
- Simplified Chinese: 张学友
Transcriptions
Standard Mandarin
- Hanyu Pinyin: Zhāng Xuéyǒu
Yue: Cantonese
- Jyutping: Zoeng1 Hok6jau5
- Website: jackycheung.hk

Jacky Cheung Hok-yau (born 10 July 1961) is a Hong Kong singer and actor. Dubbed the "God of Songs", he is the best-selling music artist of all time in Taiwan and Hong Kong, with sales of over 60 million records worldwide. His first album Smile (1985) sold over 300,000 copies in Hong Kong and his second album Amour (1986) sold over 400,000 copies, earning a multi-platinum certification from IFPI Hong Kong. After a period of declining sales in the late 1980s, The Goodbye Kiss (1993) sold over 4,000,000 copies, becoming one of the best-selling albums in Asia. In 1995, his albums sales exceeded 5,000,000 copies, making him the second highest-selling artist in the world that year, behind Michael Jackson. Cheung has embarked on ten concert tours, with the 1/2 Century World Tour (2010–2012) setting a Guinness World Record for the largest audience for a live act in twelve months. A Classic Tour (2016–2019) became one of the most-attended concert tours of all time, drawing over 4.5 million people. His accolades include the Billboard Music Award for Most Popular Asian Singer in 1994, and the World Music Award for the World's Best-Selling Asian Artist in 1996. In 1999, Cheung was honored by Junior Chamber International as one of the Ten Outstanding Young People in the World. In 2000, he was inducted into the Superstars Hall of Fame of the 1990s by Universal Music. Cheung is one of the Four Heavenly Kings of Cantopop.

As an actor, Cheung starred in films such as Devoted to You (1986), Where's Officer Tuba? (1986), As Tears Go By (1988), and The Swordsman (1990).

== Early life and education ==
Cheung was born and grew up in Quarry Bay in the Eastern District of Hong Kong Island. His father is from Tianjin and his mother is from Shanghai. As a child, he lived with his parents and two siblings in a 100 square feet apartment which they simultaneously shared with at least fifteen other relatives. He attended North Point Government Primary School from 1967 to 1973, and graduated from Literary College in 1978.

In 2007, Cheung revealed that the paternal side of his family are mostly seamen, including his father, paternal cousin, and older brother. His first language is Cantonese, but he also speaks Mandarin and basic English. He sings Cantonese, Mandarin, Japanese, Korean and modern English pop songs. Cheung is known for his rich baritone voice, but also his dramatic vibrato by rapidly moving his pronounced Adam's Apple.

== Musical career ==
=== 1985–1992: Career beginnings and early breakthrough ===
Cheung originally started working as a reservation officer for the airline Cathay Pacific. His music career started when he won the Amateur 18-Hong Kong district singing contest in 1984 with the song "Fatherland" (大地恩情) by Michael Kwan. He outcompeted more than 10,000 other contestants. After winning the contest, he was signed by the then Polygram Records, now Universal Music Group. Although encouraged by a bright start, he did not achieve immediate supremacy in Cantopop, then dominated by Leslie Cheung, Alan Tam, Anita Mui and Danny Chan. In 1985, he won his first two major awards together with the 1985 RTHK Top 10 Gold Songs Awards and the 1985 Jade Solid Gold Top 10 Awards. From 1985 to 1998, he won the Top 10 Songs award from Jade Solid Gold Best Ten Music Awards every year, except in 1988.

In 1991, he released the song "Loving You More Every Day" (每天愛你多一些), a translated version of the Japanese Southern All Stars hit "Midsummer's Fruit" (真夏の果実). The album True Love Expression (真情流露) in 1992, as well as the subsequent release, Love Sparks (愛火花) in 1992, achieved sales of over 400,000 copies in Hong Kong alone.

=== 1993–1998: Commercial success and on-stage musical ===
His subsequent albums included 1993 Me and You (我與你) and 1994 Born to be Wild (餓狼傳說). In 1994, Billboard Music Awards named him the most popular singer in Asia. He received numerous music awards both in Hong Kong and elsewhere, including the best-selling Asian artist in the World Music Awards for two consecutive years in 1995 and 1996 held at Monaco.

Amongst his hit songs, some of his most famous were "Amour", "Just want to spend my life with you" (只想一生跟你走) and "Goodbye Kiss" (吻别). The 1993 album The Goodbye Kiss (吻别) is one of the best-selling Chinese music albums of all time, achieving more sales in Hong Kong, Taiwan and Southeast Asia than ever attained before. More than 4 million copies of the album were sold in 1993, making him one of PolyGram's top 10 artists worldwide that year. It made him the first singer with non-Taiwanese citizenship to win Taiwan's Golden Melody Awards. The album was also instrumental in helping Cheung break into the mandopop market. Due to these great songs and albums, Cheung is generally considered to be the pre-eminent member of the Four Heavenly Kings of Cantopop. He is regarded by some sources as the best singer of the four.

In 1995, Cheung staged his record-breaking 100-show world tour titled "Yau Hok Yau" (友學友), literally a pun of "friendship Jacky Cheung" reusing the same Chinese characters found in his name. The tour started with 34 shows from 8 April to 9 June at the Hong Kong Coliseum. Then the tour continued in Perth and Brisbane, Australia and returned to Taipei and mainland China. It then expanded to Madison Square Garden in the US, different parts of Europe, Singapore, India, Malaysia and Japan. In 1997, Cheung was named best-selling Chinese singer in the world by Time, which reported record sales of more than 25 million worldwide.

In 1997, his work on the groundbreaking Cantonese Broadway-style musical Snow.Wolf.Lake was enthusiastically received by both audiences and critics. Cheung not only played the male lead, he was also the artistic director for this production. The first female leads were played by Sandy Lam in Hong Kong and Nadia Chan in Singapore. Kit Chan played the second female lead. They achieved 42 consecutive full-house performances at the gigantic Hung Hom Hong Kong Coliseum which remains the record today. In November 2004, Cheung and his concert manager, Florence Chan Suk-fan, worked on a revised Mandarin version of Snow.Wolf.Lake so as to bring it to a wider audience. The female leads this time were Evonne Hsu and Nadia Chan respectively. The market budget alone exceeded HK$15 million. The estimated budget for this revised production was HK$100 million and the show premiered on 24 December 2004 in Beijing.

=== 1999–2008: Widespread recognition ===
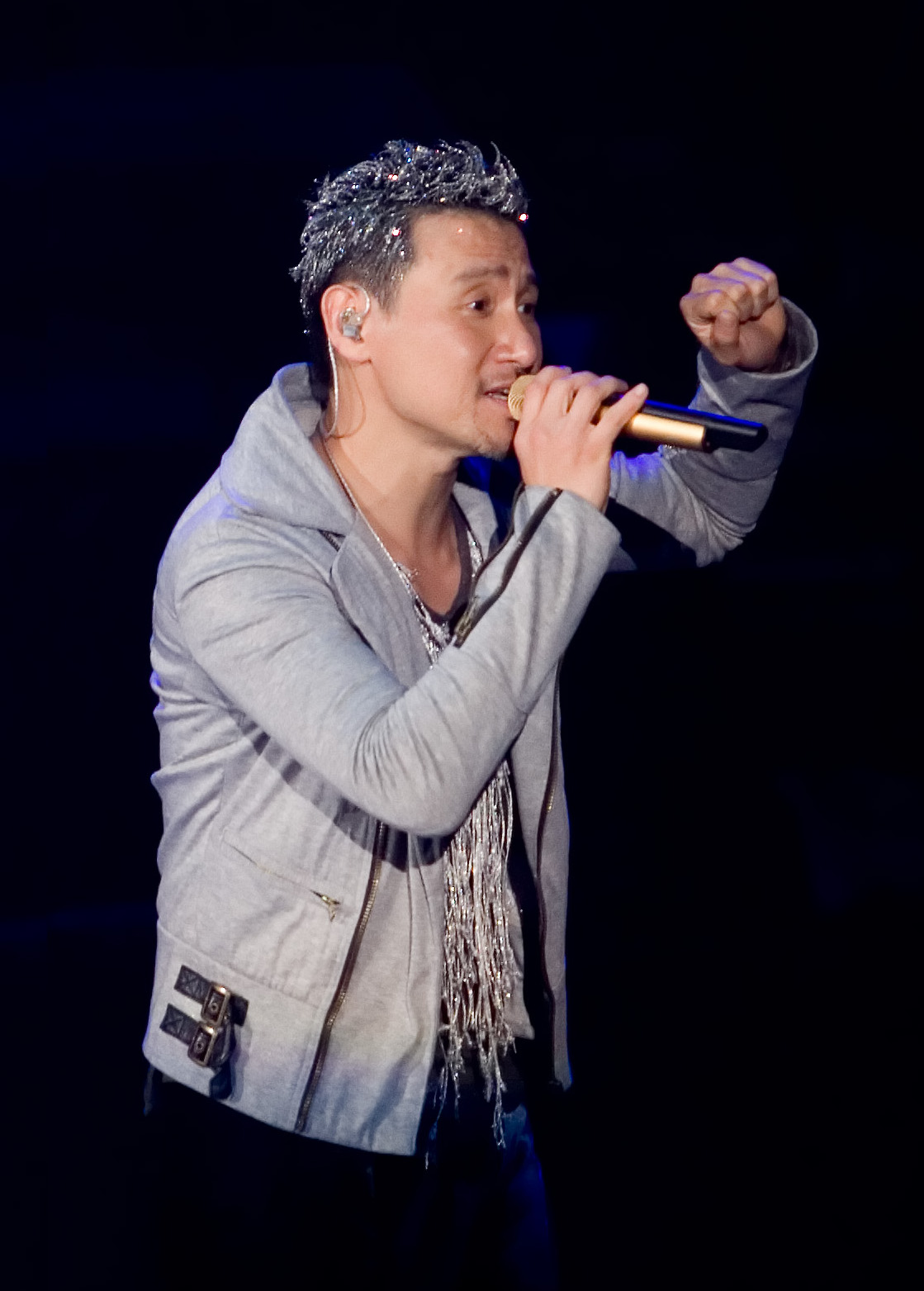
Cheung in 2007

In 1999, he was named one of the Ten Outstanding Young Persons of the World by JCI (Junior Chamber International), a worldwide federation of young professionals and entrepreneurs. In 2000 he was awarded the Golden Needle Award by RTHK. This award, the equivalent of a lifetime achievement award, recognised outstanding contributions to the music industry. He expressed his astonishment upon receiving the award, as he was the least experienced living recipient at only 16 years, and this award was awarded to singers, producers and lyricists that are late in their careers or are semi-retired, in which he was not, but to quash any negative publicity, he clarified that according to his research, there was no stipulation of this sort.

In 2004, Cheung released Life Is Like A Dream, an album in which Jacky co-produced with long-time collaborative partner Michael Au, and Jacky composed the melody for all songs, and penned the lyrics for 3 of the songs.

Cheung won the Best Selling Cantonese Album Award at the Hong Kong IFPI Awards in 2005 with his live album, Jacky Live Performance, which he took in person for the first time in years. This is despite poor ticket sales for the reason that the concert was meant to be a one-night-only charity concert in nature, and Jacky attempted to sing a song by other artists for the first time. In the fast-changing scene of canto-pop, Cheung has maintained his popularity and sales power for more than 20 years after his debut, which is very difficult in Hong Kong pop music.

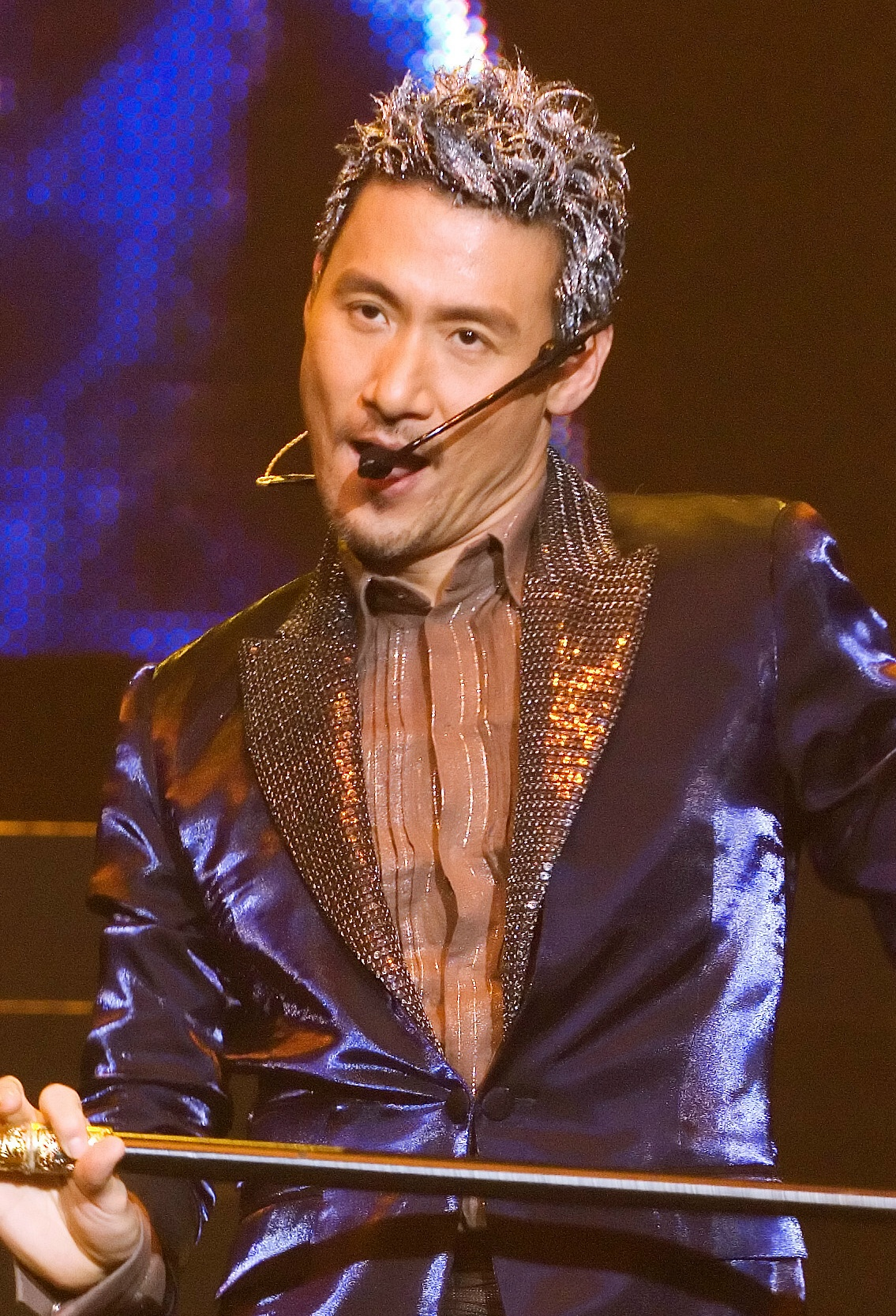
Cheung performing in 2008

In 2007, Cheung staged his Year of Jacky Cheung World Tour 2007. The tour started on 18 February 2007 at The Colosseum at Caesars Palace in Las Vegas. When the tour ended in Hong Kong on 3 February 2008 after touring 58 cities around the world, a total of 105 shows had been given, attracting more than 2 million fans. 105 became the highest number of shows in a tour by a Chinese artist, breaking the previous record of 100, which was also set by Cheung previously. In that same year, he also released a Mandopop album, By Your Side, in which he was the sole executive producer of the album for the first time after Michael Au suddenly left to further his career in Beijing.

=== 2009–2017: Touring and jazz efforts ===
In 2009, Cheung recorded Private Corner, his first jazz album for which he coined the phrase "Canto-jazz". The album was produced by Andrew Tuason. "Everyday Is Christmas", "Which Way, Robert Frost?", "Let It Go", "Lucky in Love" and "Double Trouble" were co-written by Roxanne Seeman in collaboration with Tuason, tailor-made for Cheung. "Lucky in Love" is the end-credit song of "Crossing Hennessy", Hong Kong movie starring Jacky Cheung and Tang Wei, produced by Bill Kong. Nokia's music download service website (Ovi.com) announced that "Everyday Is Christmas" was the 10th most downloaded Christmas song in the world in 2010, joining classic hits such as Wham's "Last Christmas" and Mariah Carey's "All I Want for Christmas is You". Cheung is the only Chinese language singer to make it into the Top Ten.

In 2010, Cheung started his Jacky Cheung 1/2 Century World Tour. This tour started on 30 December 2010 at Shanghai, and ended in Hong Kong on 30 May 2012. For 1 year and 5 months, his tour included 5 countries 77 cities, overall 146 shows, more than 2,800,000 audiences. 146 became the highest number of shows in a one tour by Chinese artist. Previous record of 105 was also made by Jacky Cheung on his 2007–2008 World Tour. Both 2007 and 2010 World tour was led by Andrew Tuason as Cheung's Musical Director. At the beginning of that year, he also attempted new musical styles. His new album, Private Corner, became his first ever Jazz album in Cantopop history, it also featured other non-mainstream Cantopop styles such as strings quartet, Waltz and Hymn. The special edition also featured a special glass-CD, also a first in Chinese pop history. "Double Trouble" from Private Corner was a featured produced number in the Jacky Cheung 1/2 Century World Tour.

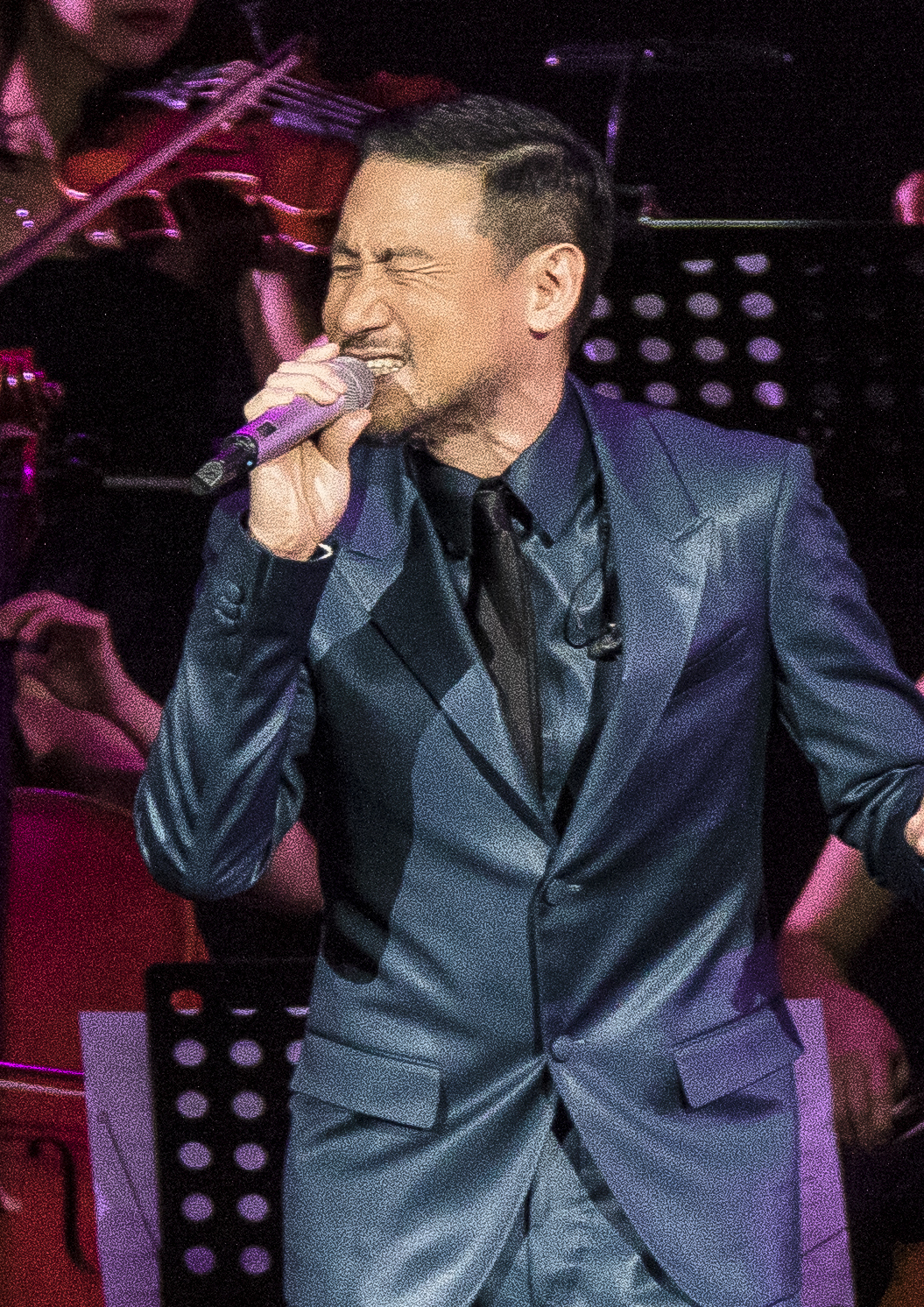
Cheung performing at the 2015 KKBOX Music Awards

For the Jacky Cheung 1/2 Century World Tour, he set a Guinness World record for the largest combined audience for a live act in 12 months, with 2,048,553 audience members. During the first 12 months of the tour, which ran from 30 December 2010 to 29 December 2011, there were 105 live concerts in 61 cities across China, USA, Malaysia, Singapore and Australia. Cheung won the 35th Anniversary Golden Song Award at the 2012 RTHK Top 10 Gold Songs Awards, as he has the greatest number of RTHK Golden Songs since the award has been started.

=== 2018–present: Continued success in touring ===
In 2018, he earned a new nickname of "Fugitive Bait" or "Fugitives' Krytonite" in China as his concerts attracted wanted criminals in China to purchase tickets to watch his concerts in China. He helped to bring 4 wanted criminals to be captured between April and June 2018 during Cheung's Chinese leg of the world tour. In June, two ticket scalpers were also captured. This was also part of his 233-show A Classic Tour, which eclipses the previous tour record. The entire tour, which lasted for 27 months with performances in 97 cities, ended on 29 January 2019 after a series of 15 concerts in Hong Kong. It attracted over 4,500,000 people and grossed approximately US$330 million during its entire run, making it amongst the most-attended and highest-grossing concert tours of all time.

The Jacky Cheung 60+ Concert Tour opened at The Venetian Macau Cotai Arena in Macau, China on June 9, 2023. Cheung performs, singing and dancing with a dance troupe of 20 members with new choreography and dazzling production sets. The tour schedule includes arena-size shows in Macau, Singapore, Malaysia, Wuhan, Guangzhou, Chengdu, Ningbo and additional venues across China in to 2024.

== Acting career ==
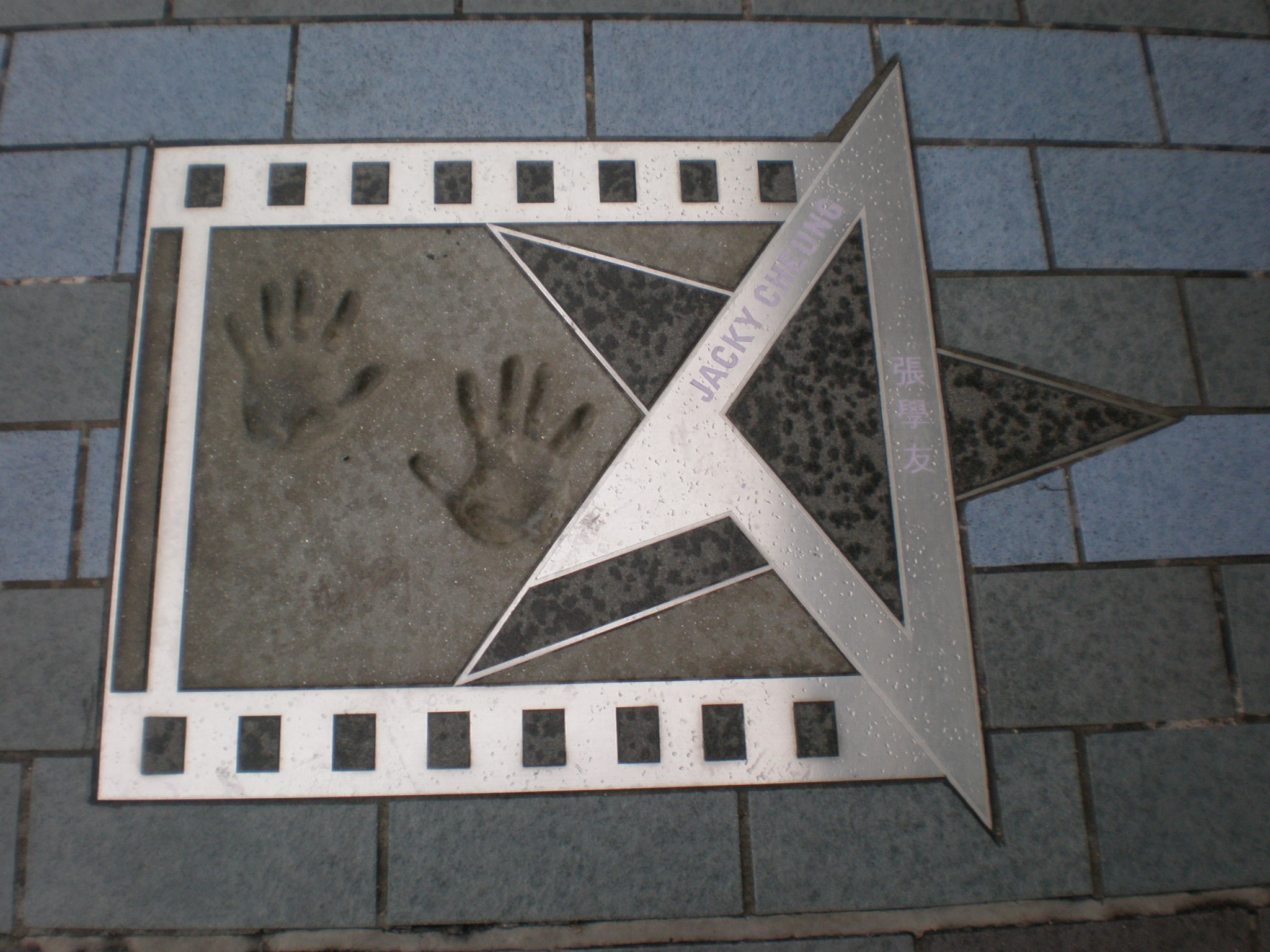
Cheung's hand print an autograph at the Avenue of Stars in Hong Kong.

Cheung made his film debut in 1986 starring in movies such as Devoted to You and Where's Officer Tuba?. He received the Best Supporting Actor award at the 8th Hong Kong Film Awards for his work in As Tears Go By (1988) as well as the Best Supporting Actor Golden Horse Award for The Swordsman (1990). That same year, he also collaborated with John Woo and Tony Leung in the action film Bullet in the Head. He also received the Best Actor Award at the International Film Festival of India for his work in July Rhapsody (2002). His song Perhaps Love, which serves as the theme song for the 2005 award-winning film of the same name, also won the Best Song Award at the 2005 Hong Kong Film Award and the CASH Best Song Award at the 2006 CASH Gold Sail Music Awards.

In 2002, he appeared in Taiwanese mini-series Love Scar (2002) with F4 member Jerry Yan and Karen Mok, where he played Jerry Yan's older brother. In the 2004 drama film Jiang Hu directed by Wong Ching-po, Cheung plays Lefty, the best friend and right-hand man of crime boss Hung Yan Chau (Andy Lau). The film includes several other actors from Infernal Affairs. As of 2021, he is one of a handful of Chinese singer-actors who have never starred in a television drama.

== Ceremonies and spokesperson ==
Cheung was named the spokesperson for Hong Kong Disneyland in 2004. He took part in a number of large-scale marketing events organised by The Walt Disney Company and Walt Disney Parks and Resorts, beginning with the hosting of a program from TVB, which is called Magical World of Disneyland. He recorded a multi-lingual song for Hong Kong Disneyland, entitled One. The music video for One was filmed at Hong Kong Disneyland. He also recorded for Hong Kong Disneyland: The Grand Opening Celebration Album.

In December 2006, Cheung performed live the theme song "Together Now" at the Opening Ceremony of the 15th Asian Games in Doha, Qatar. He was introduced as "the most popular Asian performer in the world". In 2010, Cheung and Jane Zhang sang the Mandarin version of the Coca-Cola Celebration Mix of K'naan's "Wavin' Flag", which was the brand's promotional anthem for the 2010 FIFA World Cup. In 2012, Cheung sang "中国节拍·震动世界", the cheering song of China for the 2012 London Olympics.

== Personal life ==
In 1986, Cheung met Hong Kong actress May Lo during the filming of Devoted to You, a movie that they both starred in. On 15 February 1996, they married in London, England . The couple have two daughters, born in 2000 and 2005.

Cheung is a Buddhist and a vegetarian.

=== Foreign domestic helper incident ===
In 2006, Cheung's Filipino domestic helper was discovered stealing three photographs and a personal letter and was reported for theft by Cheung. The Magistrates' court sentenced her to two six months sentences for theft to be served concurrently. The helper appealed against the sentence at the Court of First Instance. The appeal was unsuccessful but her sentence was reduced to three months.

The case sparked controversy among domestic helpers in Hong Kong. Some argued that Cheung over-reacted and the sentence was disproportionate and the case was regarded by some as racial discrimination. The Philippines consulate also said that Cheung's family had employed 21 different maids in a three-year period and placed Cheung on a "blacklist" that would prevent him from employing any Filipino maids in the future. As a result, his four Filipino domestic helpers resigned immediately.

=== Community work ===
In March 2009, he became the first Cantopop/Mandopop artist to contribute items to the Hard Rock franchise memorabilia collection. Items are to be exhibited at the Hard Rock hotel in Macau. A joint donation is also made to donate HK$600,000 to the Children's Cancer Foundation and ORBIS Macau. In September 2009, Cheung, was one of the super ambassadors of End Child Sexual Abuse Foundation (ECSAF) founded by Josephine Siao; he attended the charity fundraising event for ECSAF's 10th anniversary in Hong Kong.

== Discography ==
Cantonese studio albums

- Smile (1985)
- Amour (1986)
- Fall in Love (1986)
- Jacky (1987)
- In My Dream Last Night (1988)
- For My Dearest (1989)
- I Only Want to Love One Person in My Life (1989)
- Dreamed of You (1990)
- Can't Help You (情不禁) (1991)
- An Unchanging Heart (1991)
- True Feelings Revealed (1992)
- Love Spark (1992)
- You & I (1993)
- Hungry Wolf (饿狼传说) (1994)
- A Warm Winter (1994)
- Guo Min Shi Jie (过敏世界) (1995)
- Legend of Never Aging (1997)
- Release Yourself (1998)
- Someone (1999)
- The First (2001)
- Life Is Like a Dream (2004)
- Private Corner (2010)

Mandarin studio albums

- Homeless Love (1996)
- Zai Wo Xin Shen Chu (1997)
- Yì Luàn Qíng Mí (1988)
- Sì Céng Xiāng Shí (1989)
- The Goodbye Kiss (1993)
- Blessings (1993)
- Stealing Hearts (1994)
- Yong You (1995)
- How Could I Forget You? (1996)
- Wanna Feel the Breeze With You (1997)
- No Regret (1988)
- Walk By 1999 (1999)
- Jacky Fever (2001)
- By Your Side (2007)
- Wake Up Dreaming (2014)

== Concert tours ==
- Jacky Cheung 87 Concert (1987)
- Love You More Every Day Tour (1991)
- School & Friends World Tour (1993–1994)
- Jacky Cheung 95 World Tour (1995–1996)
- Friends World Tour (1999)
- Music Odyssey Tour (2002–2003)
- The Year of Jacky Cheung World Tour (2007–2008)
- Jacky Cheung 1/2 Century World Tour (2010–2012)
- A Classic Tour (2016–2019)
- Jacky Cheung 60+ Concert Tour (2023–2026)

== Awards and nominations ==
IFPI Gold Disc Award

- 1989 87'演唱會 Polygram
- 1990 絲絲記憶精選 Polygram

IFPI Platinum Disc Award

- 1985 Smile Polygram
- 1986 遙遠的她 Polygram
- 1987 相愛 Polygram
- 1987 Jacky Polygram
- 1988 昨夜夢魂中 Polygram
- 1990 給我親愛的 Polygram
- 1990 祇願一生愛一人 Polygram

Golden Melody Award for Best Male Mandarin Singer

- 1998 想和你去吹吹風 Polygram

IFPI Top 10 Sales Album

- 2003 Where is he 他在那裡 What's Music
- 2004 Black & White What's Music
- 2005 活出生命 Live 演唱會 What's Music

IFPI Top 10 Sales Artist

- 2005

IFPI Top Sales Album

- 2005 活出生命 Live 演唱會 What's Music

== See also ==
- List of best-selling albums in Taiwan

== Sources ==
- "MTV Top 10 Christmas Songs 2010"
- "Ovi Music Trends Top 10 Downloaded Festive Songs"
