= 27th Awit Awards =

2014 Philippine music awards ceremony

- Date: December 12, 2014
- Location: Newport Performing Arts Theater, Resorts World Manila, Pasay
- Hosted by: Marion Aunor & Josh Padilla

Highlights
- Most awards: Gloc-9 (6)
- Most nominations: Gloc-9 (9)
- Album of the Year: Liham at Lihim by Gloc-9
- Song of the Year: "Magda" by Gloc-9

Television/radio coverage
- Produced by: 360 Degrees International

The 27th Awit Awards were held at the Newport Performing Arts Theater in Resorts World Manila, Pasay. They honored the best of Filipino music for the year 2013.

Gloc-9 received the most nominations with nine. He was followed by Thyro Alfaro and Ito Rapadas with seven. Jumbo De Belen and Jonathan Manalo came next receiving six nods.

The awards night was hosted by Marion Aunor and Josh Padilla. Gloc-9 won most of the awards with six.

== Winners and nominees ==
Winners are listed first and highlighted in bold. Nominated producers, composers and lyricists are not included in this list, unless noted. For the full list, please go to their official website.

=== Performance Awards ===
Best Performance by a Female Recording Artist	Best Performance by a Male Recording Artist
**"Pasakalye" – Zia Quizon**; "Anything for You" – Charice; "Ikot-ikot" – Sarah Geronimo; "Sa 'Yo na Lang Ako" – Karylle; "Bakit Lumuluha" – KZ Tandingan	**"Lucky in Love" – Paolo Onesa**; "Pusong Bato" – Jovit Baldivino; "Araw, Ulap, Langit" – Christian Bautista; "No Limitations" – Sam Concepcion; "Fix You" – Myk Perez
Best Performance by a Group Recording Artists	Best Performance by a New Female Recording Artist
**"Ang Parokya" – Parokya ni Edgar feat. Gloc-9 & Frank Magalona**; "Discolamon" – Banda ni Kleggy; "Drown" – Rocksteddy; "Back for More" – Sandwich; "Bumalik Ka na sa 'Kin" – Silent Sanctuary	**"If You Ever Change Your Mind" – Marion Aunor**; "Bubble" – Marielle Castro; "Coming Home" – Janice Javier; "Pictures" – Kate Torralba; "Masdan Mo ang Kapaligiran" – Ferns Tosco
Best Performance by a New Male Recording Artist	Best Performance by a New Group Recording Artists
**"Lucky in Love" – Paolo Onesa**; "Cerberus" – Abra feat. Loonie & Ron Henley; "One More Try" – Sean Erwin; "Ikaw at Ako" – TJ Monterde; "Fix You" – Myk Perez	**"Waka-Waka" – Koro Ilustrado**; "Discolamon" – Banda ni Kleggy; "Patuloy ang Pangarap" – Maasinhon Trio; "High" – Save Me Hollywood; "Always You" – The Angelos
Best Collaboration
**"Magda" – Gloc-9 feat. Rico Blanco**; "Diwata" – Abra & Chito Miranda; "Dati" – Sam Concepcion & Tippy Dos Santos feat. Quest; "I Finally Found Someone" – Radha & Thor; "Meron Nang Iba" – Silent Sanctuary feat. Ashley Gosiengfiao

=== Creativity Awards ===
Album of the Year	Song of the Year
**Liham at Lihim – Gloc-9**; Metamorphosis – Yeng Constantino; Expressions – Sarah Geronimo; Noon, Ngayon, Bukas, Kailanman... Palagi – Zsa Zsa Padilla; A Little Bit of Lovin’ – Zia Quizon	**"Magda"** **Aristotle Pollisco (composer & lyricist)**; "Dati" Thyro Alfaro & Yumi Lacsamana (composers & lyricists); "Gayuma" Raymond Abracosa (composer & lyricist); "Pasakalye" Jungee Marcelo (composer & lyricist); "Ikot-ikot" Jumbo De Belen & Thyro Alfaro (composers & lyricists)
Best Selling Album of the Year	Best Ballad Recording
**DJP – Daniel Padilla**	**"Scared to Death" – KZ Tandingan**; "Araw, Ulap, Langit" – Christian Bautista; "Sweetest Mistake" – Sarah Geronimo; "Hanggang Wakas" – Juris; "Sa 'Yo na Lang Ako" – Karylle
Best Rock/Alternative Recording	Best World Music Recording
**"To Survive" – Franco**; "Ang Parokya" – Parokya ni Edgar feat. Gloc-9 & Frank Magalona; "Pilipinas, Kailan Ka Magigising?" – Rivermaya; "Bumalik Ka na sa 'Kin" – Silent Sanctuary; "Never Will I Forget" – Urbandub	**"Pansamantagal" – Sitti Navarro & Julianne Tarroja**; "Papel" – Joey Ayala & Gloc-9 feat. Denise Barbacena; "Space" – Banda ni Kleggy & Kean Cipriano; "Philippines" – Ferns Tosco feat. Sly Kane
Best Novelty Recording	Best Dance Recording
**"Papel" – Joey Ayala & Gloc-9 feat. Denise Barbacena**; "Pusong Bato" – Jovit Baldovino; "Discolamon" – Banda ni Kleggy; "Kahit Na" – Toni Gonzaga; "Askal" – Jose & Wally	**"No Limitations" – Sam Concepcion**; "Karakaraka" – Vice Ganda feat. Smugglaz; "Magsayawan/ Rock Baby Rock (Medley)" – Enrique Gil; "Kiss You" – Karylle; "Wish" – Jed Madela
Best Inspirational/Religious Recording	Best Christmas Recording
**"Nathaniel (Gift of God)" – Regine Velasquez-Alcasid**; "Make Me Yours" – Sarah Geronimo; "Home to You" – Jed Madela; "This Song is For You" – Erik Santos; "Darating Din" – KZ Tandingan	**"Hele ni Inay" – Regine Velasquez-Alcasid**; "Tahanan" – Bukas Palad Music Ministry feat. Toto Sorioso; "Ang Ugaling Pagmamano" – Eurika; "Perfect Christmas" – Richard Yap; "Christmas Around the World" – Various Artists
Best Rap Recording	Best Jazz Recording
**"Magda" – Gloc-9 feat. Rico Blanco**; "Cerberus" – Abra feat. Loonie & Ron Henley; "Bago ang Lahat" – Loonie feat. Ron Henley & Kat Alano; "Venus" – Ron Henley feat. Yumi; "Trip Lang" – Shehyee feat. Sam Pinto	**"Darating Din" – KZ Tandingan**; "Sex on Legs" – Marion Aunor; "Cool" – Timmy Pavino; "Pansamantagal" – Sitti Navarro & Julianne Tarroja
Best R&B Recording	Best Regional Recording
**"Ikot-ikot" – Sarah Geronimo**; "I'm the One" – Sam Concepcion; "Dati" – Sam Concepcion & Tippy Dos Santos feat. Quest; "Tonight" – Mica Javier feat. JayR; "Sabihin Mo Naman" – Kris Lawrence	**"Abe Pakakalale" (in Kapampangan) – Andy Alvis**; **"Taldawa" (in Kapampangan) – Edward**; "Di Ka Agsukit Sukit" (in Ilocano) – Sika Ken Ti Musika
Best Song Written for Movie/TV/Stage Play
**"Bakit Hindi Ka Crush ng Crush Mo?" (from Bakit Hindi Ka** **Crush ng Crush Mo?) – Zia Quizon**; "Nandiyan Palagi" (from Genesis) – Regine Velasquez-Alcasid; "Annaliza" (from Annaliza) – Roel Manlangit

=== Technical Achievement Awards ===
Best Musical Arrangement	Best Vocal Arrangement
**"Hele ni Inay" – Homer Flores**; "Dati" – Thyro Alfaro & Jumbo De Belen; "Do, Do, Do" – Elmer Blancaflor, Vehnee Saturno & Marion Aunor; "Sa 'Yo Na Lang Ako" – Arnold Buena; "1 Week To Move On" – Albert Tamayo	**"Darating Din" – Yosha Honasan**; "Dati" – Thyro Alfaro & Jumbo De Belen; "H’wag Kang Bibitiw" – Garry Cruz; "Ikaw Na" – Jonathan Manalo; "How Could an Angel Break My Heart" – Jonathan Manalo
Best Engineered Recording	Best Album Package
**"Never Will I Forget" – Eric Perlas & Macoy Manuel**; "Makita Kang Muli" – Dante Taňedo; "Un-Love You" – Dante Taňedo; "Hele ni Inay" – Willy Villa; "Sometimes That Happens" – Willy Villa	**Hulog Ka ng Langit** **Jay Saturnino Lumboy & Anne Kate Piñero (graphic design)** **Jay Saturnino Lumboy (album concept)** **Mark Nicdao (photography)**; Fat Salt and Flame Inksurge (graphic design & album concept) RA Rivera, Dareen Baylon & Inksurge (photography); Metamorphosis Andrew Castillo (graphic design & album concept) BJ Pascual (photography); SOS Miguel Lugtu (graphic design) Miguel Lugtu & Solenn Heussaff (album concept) BJ Pascual (photography); Vice Ganda Andrew Castillo (graphic design & album concept) Jun de Leon, Tim de Leon & Miguel de Leon (photography)
Music Video of the Year
**"Ilusyon" – Abra feat. Arci Muñoz** **Raymond Abracosa (director)**; "Chinito" – Yeng Constantino Avid Liongoren (director); "To Survive" – Franco Kerwin Go (director); "Magda" – Gloc-9 feat. Rico Blanco J. Pacena II (director); "New Romancer" – Sandwich Treb Monteras (director)

=== Digital Awards ===
EGG's AllHits.ph Most Downloaded Song for 2013	EGG's AllHits.ph Most Downloaded Artist for 2013
**"Don't Say Goodbye" – Louie Ocampo & Martin Nievera**^{[A]}	**Nina**
I-Gateway Mobile Philippines Inc.'s Most Downloaded Song for 2013	I-Gateway Mobile Philippines Inc.'s Most Downloaded Artist for 2013
**"Chinito" – Jed Dumawal**^{[A]}	**Yeng Constantino**
MyMusicStore's Most Downloaded Song for 2013	MyMusicStore's Most Downloaded Artist for 2013
**"Two Steps Behind" – Six Part Invention**^{[A]}	**Six Part Invention**

Note:

^[A]The awards were given specifically to the composers, instead of the recording artists/groups.

=== Special Award ===
Dangal ng Musikang Pilipino Award
- **Side A**
