= Pop Goes Standards =

- Album cover

Studio album by Paolo Onesa
- Released: 14 February 2014
- Genre: Pop
- Length: 35:00
- Label: UMUSIC Philippines
- Producer: Francis Guevarra

Paolo Onesa chronology
Pop Goes Standards (2014)	Handwritten (2016)

Singles from Pop Goes Standards
- 1. "Lucky in Love" Released: 23 September 2013; 2. "You Are So Beautiful" Released: 8 August 2015

Pop Goes Standards is the debut album by Filipino singer Paolo Onesa, released February 14, 2014 by MCA Music, Inc. The songs are a collection of covers of classic pop songs and two originals sung in the standard style that became the signature of Onesa in his performances as a crooner in the live shows of The Voice of the Philippines. The album was produced by Francis Guevarra. Onesa received an Awit Award for Best Performance by a Male Recording Artist and Best Performance by a New Male Recording Artist at the 28th Awit Awards for his recording of “Lucky In Love”, the first single from the album.

== Background ==
Onesa grew up listening to standards with his father. He entered The Voice of the Philippines as a contestant and was chosen by Coach Bamboo Mañalac to join his team. Prior to the show, Onesa performed songs in various genres, without having a definitive style. As Onesa's mentor, Bamboo encouraged Onesa to pursue singing cover songs in the standard style, with his own brand of crooning. He covered the Joe Cocker song “You Are So Beautiful”, The Temptations “Just My Imagination”, and the James Bond theme, “Skyfall” among them, along with two originals, “Lucky in Love” and “Which Way, Robert Frost?”.

The album was released on Valentine’s Day, February 14, 2014, with an official launch held at Cucina ni Bunso in Quezon City.

=== Music videos ===
Music videos of two singles from the album were released:

- "Lucky in Love" video released in 2014 and was first aired on MYX PH.
- "You Are So Beautiful" video released on 18 July 2015 and first aired on MYX PH.

== Track listing ==
No.	Title	Writer(s)	Length
1.	"Lucky in Love"	Roxanne Seeman; Daniel Nitt	4:13
2.	"You Are So Beautiful"	Billy Preston; Bruce Fisher	2:35
3.	"Make You Feel My Love"		3:48
4.	"Just My Imagination (Running Away With Me) [feat. Klarisse de Guzman]"	Adkins; Kurstin	4:15
5.	"Marry Me"	Pat Monahan	3:38
6.	"You're Beautiful"	James Blunt; Sacha Skarbek; Amanda Ghost	3:31
7.	"When I Was Your Man"	Bruno Mars; Philip Lawrence; Ari Levin; Andrew Wyatt	3:37
8.	"Which Way, Robert Frost?"	Roxanne Seeman; Philipp Steinke	2:51
9.	"Skyfall"	Adele Adkins; Paul Epworth	3:58
10.	"Elesi"	Rico Blanco	2:58
Total length:			35:00
