= Ilusyon =

2013 single by Abra

Single by Abra

from the album Abra
- Language: Tagalog
- Released: June 1, 2013
- Genre: Pinoy hip hop; Political hip hop
- Label: Artifice Records
- Lyricist: Raymond Abracosa
- Producer: Jonathan Ong

Abra singles chronology
"Gayuma" (2012)	"Ilusyon" (2013)	"Midas" (2013)

Music video
- Ilusyon on YouTube

"Ilusyon" (lit. 'Illusion') is a song by Filipino rapper Abra. It was released on June 1, 2013, and was later included on his self-titled debut studio album, released in March 2014. Its music video features actress Arci Muñoz.

== Background ==
"Ilusyon" was released as one of the singles from Abra's self-titled debut album while the record was still in production. The track followed the success of his earlier single "Gayuma" (2012) and was included on the album when it was released in March 2014. The lyrics question why many of the country's social problems continue despite repeated promises of reform from elected officials. Abra mentions issues such as corruption, flooding, traffic congestion, poverty, unemployment, education, and access to affordable healthcare throughout the song.

== Music video ==
The official music video features actress Arci Muñoz. At the 27th Awit Awards, it received the award for Music Video of the Year. In 2026, the music video had surpassed 11 million views on YouTube.

== Reception ==
Over a decade since its release, "Ilusyon" regained popularity in 2026 when parts of its lyrics became widely circulated on social media. This included the sharing of the song via platforms such as Facebook and Reddit, in addition to going over its music video on YouTube for discussion regarding its content. Billboard Philippines described "Ilusyon" as a politically conscious hip-hop song that makes an attack on corruption, inequality, and broken promises.

== Personnel ==
Credits are adapted from the official YouTube music video description.

- Abra – vocals, songwriter, lyricist
- Jonathan Ong – producer
- Not Vinzons – recording engineer
- Brian Lotho – recording engineer

== Accolades ==
Awards and nominations for "Ilusyon"
Year	Award	Category	Result	Ref.
2014	27th Awit Awards	Music Video of the Year	Won	
