= Lucky in Love =

Lucky in Love may refer to:

- "Lucky in Love" (Jacky Cheung song)
- "Lucky in Love" (Mick Jagger song)
- Lucky in Love: The Best of Rick Vito, a 2009 compilation album by Rick Vito
- "Lucky in Love", an episode of the American animated television series Danny Phantom
- Lucky in Love (film), a 1929 musical comedy starring Morton Downey and Betty Lawford
