= Myx Music Awards 2016 =

Annual Philippine music awards ceremony

- Date: March 15, 2016
- Location: Kia Theater, Araneta Quezon City
- Country: Philippines
- Hosted by: Myx VJs

Highlights
- Most wins: Nadine Lustre (5)
- Most nominations: Bamboo, Darren Espanto, Nadine Lustre, Julie Anne San Jose (5)
- Website: www.myxph.com/myxmusicawards/

Television/radio coverage
- Network: Myx

Myx Music Awards 2016 is the 11th installment of the Myx Music Awards acknowledging the past year's biggest hitmakers in the Philippine music industry. For the fifth consecutive year, fans can vote online through Myx website.

Nominees were announced on February 9, 2016, starting at 6pm via MYX channel and live streaming. Leading the nominees were singers Bamboo, Darren Espanto, Nadine Lustre, and Julie Anne San Jose with five nominations each.

== Winners and nominees ==
Winners are listed first and highlighted in boldface.

Myx Magna Award (Special Award)	Best Music Video (Special Award)
**Ogie Alcasid**	**"Cerberus" - Abra feat. Loonie & Ron Henley (Dir. Willan Rivera)**; "Me and You" - Nadine Lustre (Dir. Miggy Tanchangco); "Minamahal" - Sarah Geronimo (Dir. Nolan Bernardino); "See You" - Hale (Dir. Veejay Jimenez); "Teka Break" - Sam Concepcion (Dir. Voltz Hubillo & Icko Gonzales)
Favorite Music Video	Favorite Song
**"Me and You" - Nadine Lustre (Dir. Miggy Tanchangco)**; "Firepower" - Bamboo (Dir. Paolo Valenciano); "Makin' Moves" - Darren Espanto (Dir. Ian Galsim); "Minamahal" - Sarah Geronimo (Dir. Nolan Bernardino); "Tidal Wave" - Julie Anne San Jose (Dir. Laura Ferro)	**"Me and You" - Nadine Lustre**; "Firepower" - Bamboo; "Stuck" - Darren Espanto; "Teka Break" - Sam Concepcion; "Tidal Wave" - Julie Anne San Jose
Favorite Artist	Favorite Group
**Nadine Lustre**; Bamboo; Darren Espanto; Julie Anne San Jose; Sarah Geronimo	**Silent Sanctuary**; Callalily; Gimme 5; Slapshock; Sponge Cola
Favorite Male Artist	Favorite Female Artist
**Darren Espanto**; Abra; Alden Richards; Bamboo; Juan Karlos Labajo	**Nadine Lustre**; Julie Anne San Jose; Kathryn Bernardo; Sarah Geronimo; Yeng Constantino
Favorite New Artist	Favorite Mellow Video
**Jason Dy**; Alex Gonzaga; Jensen and the Flips; Julian Marcus Trono; The Juans	**"Dance Without The Music" - Yeng Constantino (Dir. Cristhian Escolano)**; "Mr. Right" - Kim Chiu (Dir. Cristhian Escolano); "Nag-iisa Lang" - Angeline Quinto (Dir. Cristhian Escolano); "Para Sa 'Yo" - Juan Karlos Labajo (Dir. Frank Lloyd Mamaril); "Wish I May" - Alden Richards (Dir. Louie Ignacio)
Favorite Urban Video	Favorite Rock Video
**"Diwata" - Abra feat. Chito Miranda (Dir. Marco Gatchalian & Mark Ginolos)**; "Cerberus" - Abra feat. Loonie & Ron Henley (Dir. Willan Rivera); "Langit" - Ron Henley feat. BV (Dir. Jasper Salimbangon); "The Revival" - Q-York (Dir. Cristhian Escolano); "Walking Distance" - Smugglaz feat. Alodia Gosiengfiao (Dir. Edrex Clyde Sanchez)	**"Firepower" - Bamboo (Dir. Paolo Valenciano)**; "Kagulo" - Sandwich (Dir. Quark Henares); "See You" - Hale (Dir. Veejay Jimenez); "Tayo Na Lang Dalawa" - Mayonnaise (Dir. Juancho Pancho); "Why" - Pupil (Dir. Mike Talampas & Nick Santiago)
Favorite Collaboration	Favorite Remake
**"Hanap Hanap" - James Reid & Nadine Lustre**; "Bitter Song" - Callalily feat. Maychelle Baay; "Diwata" - Abra feat. Chito Miranda; "Move On" - Sponge Cola feat. Jane Oineza; "Tandaan Mo 'To" - Erik Santos feat. Gloc-9	**"On The Wings Of Love" - Kyla**; "Cruisin'" - Christian Bautista & Julie Anne San Jose; "I Got You (I Feel Good)" - Daniel Padilla; "Mr. DJ" - Kathryn Bernardo; "When I Met You" - Nikki Gil
Favorite Media Soundtrack	Favorite Guest Appearance In A Music Video
**"On The Wings Of Love" - Kyla**; "Hanggang Wala Nang Bukas" - Ebe Dancel; "Happily Ever After" - Janella Salvador; "Nothing's Gonna Stop Us Now" - Daniel Padilla feat. Morissette; "Paano Ba Ang Magmahal" - Sarah Geronimo & Piolo Pascual	**Alden Richards ("Kapangyarihan Ng Pag-Ibig" - Aicelle Santos)**; Ella Cruz ("Isang Araw" - Kaye Cal); Jeron Teng ("Move On" - Sponge Cola feat. Jane Oineza); Loisa Andalio & Joshua Garcia ("Ako'y Tinamaan" - Reo Brothers); Xian Lim ("Mr. Right" - Kim Chiu)
Favorite International Video	Favorite MYX Celebrity VJ
**"Bad Blood - Taylor Swift**; "Drag Me Down - One Direction; "One Last Time - Ariana Grande; "She's Kinda Hot - 5 Seconds of Summer; "Where Are Ü Now - Skrillex & Diplo feat. Justin Bieber	**Darren Espanto**; Kathryn Bernardo; Jairus Aquino & Sharlene San Pedro; Iñigo Pascual; Kim Chiu; Alex Gonzaga; Nash Aguas & Alexa Ilacad; Janella Salvador; Ella Cruz; Juan Karlos Labajo; Jane Oineza; Matteo Guidicelli

== Multiple awards ==
=== Artist(s) with multiple wins ===
The following artist(s) received two or more awards:

Wins	Artist(s)
5	Nadine Lustre
2	Abra
2	Darren Espanto
2	Kyla

=== Artist(s) with multiple nominations ===
The following artist(s) received more than two nominations:

Nominations	Artist(s)
5	Bamboo
5	Darren Espanto
5	Nadine Lustre
5	Julie Anne San Jose
4	Sarah Geronimo
4	Abra
3	Sponge Cola
3	Alden Richards
3	Juan Karlos Labajo
3	Kathryn Bernardo
3	Kim Chiu
3	Jane Oineza
