= Inspirasyon =

Single by Shehyee

from the album Shehyee
- Released: November 30, 2013
- Recorded: 2013
- Genre: Rap; OPM
- Length: 4:19
- Label: FlipMusic
- Songwriter: Shehyee
- Producers: Thyro Alfaro and Bojam

Shehyee singles chronology
""Trip Lang" (feat. Sam Pinto)" (2013)	"Inspirasyon" (2013)	""Isang Umaga" (feat. Yumi)" (2014)

Music video
- "Inspirasyon" on YouTube

Inspirasyon (English: Inspiration) is a song by Filipino rapper Shehyee from his debut eponymous album on 2013. It was released on November 30, 2013.

== Music video ==
The song's music video that features the track's composer and performer in a studio with a band has reached almost six million views on YouTube.

== Commercial performance ==
It was featured on local radio's top ten lists consistently from 2013 to 2014 after Shehyee's breakout fame from FlipTop Battle League.

== Critical reception ==
The track was praised as a 'quality inspirational and motivational song with also a quality music video' by an author in the blog site UrbanPinas.
