= Guddhist Gunatita =

Filipino rapper

- Born: Genesis Lago
- Origin: Tanay, Rizal
- Genres: Pinoy hip hop; conscious hip hop; trap music; lo-fi hip hop
- Occupations: Rapper; songwriter; entrepreneur
- Instrument: Vocals
- Years active: 2018–present
- Label: Believe Music
- Member of: 1096 Gang

Genesis Lago, known professionally as Guddhist Gunatita, is a Filipino rapper and songwriter. He is a member of the hip hop collective group 1096 Gang and owner of the streetwear brand Gudds.

== Early life ==
Genesis Lago grew up exposed to rap music, influenced by his father. In his teenage years, he struggled with alcohol and cannabis, leading to his enrollment in rehabilitation at 18.

== Career ==
Guddhist started his music career in 2018. He started by working with the group 1096 Gang and appeared on the viral hit "Pajama Party (Cypher 1)".

In 2021, he released his debut album Metamorphosis, features tracks such as "Sige", "Salamat G", and "Di Na Babalik". He released "Manindigan", featuring the musicians Trvmata and Lois.

In 2022, he released a laid-back single titled "GUDDS" to celebrate his birthday. The song which came out on streaming platforms with a music video on February 15, shows Guddhist looking back on his struggles.

In 2023, he released the single "Gudds". Later singles include "Sana Lahat Gumaan" and "Aningan", featuring Loir. He also collaborated with Loir on "Umaga" and with KJah and Ron Henley on "Tahan Na". He is signed to Believe Music.

In 2024, he released several singles including "Kalangitan", "Plano", "S.O.S. (Some Old Story)", "Parang Panaginip", and "Banal Na Tao".

== Artistry ==
Guddhist describes his style as conscious rap, and chose the stage name "Guddhist" to reflect his focus on kindness and positivity, drawing inspiration from Buddhist practices like meditation, yoga, and vegetarianism. His songs focus on gratitude and redemption. Guddhist has said that he is inspired to collaborate with Gloc‑9.

== Other ventures ==
Guddhist runs the streetwear brand Gudds and works as a dog breeder.

== Discography ==
=== Studio albums ===
- Metamorphosis (2021)

=== EPs ===
- Blueprint (2023)

=== Singles ===
- Sige (2021)
- Di Na Babalik (2021)
- Manindigan (featuring Trvmata & Lois) (2021)
- Gudds (2023)
- Sana Lahat Gumaan (2023)
- Aningan (featuring Loir) (2023)
- Tahan Na (with KJah & Ron Henley) (2023)
- Kalangitan (2024)
- Plano (2024)
- S.O.S. (Some Old Story) (2024)
- Parang Panaginip (2024)
- Banal Na Tao (2024)

=== As featured artist ===
- Umaga (with Loir) (2023)
