= Shehyee (album) =

Studio album by Shehyee
- Released: October 11, 2013
- Recorded: 2012–2013
- Studio: FlipMusic Records
- Genre: Pinoy hip hop
- Length: 48:33
- Label: Viva Records, FlipMusic Records
- Producer: Bojam and Thyro of FlipMusic Records

Shehyee is the self-titled debut album of Filipino hip hop artist and rapper Shehyee, released October 11, 2013. It was produced by Bojam and Thyro of FlipMusic Records and features 12 tracks, mostly self-composed by Shehyee.

== Track listing ==
All tracks are written by Shehyee

No.	Title	Length
1.	"Welcome"	0:35
2.	"Trip Lang" (featuring Sam Pinto)	3:02
3.	"Maria Clara"	4:03
4.	"Balang Araw"	3:15
5.	"Oops Teka (Interlude)"	0:48
6.	"Inspirasyon"	4:19
7.	"Isang Umaga" (featuring Yumi)	4:09
8.	"Halika Na" (featuring Ann B. Mateo)	3:54
9.	"Suplado" (featuring Thyro & Juan Tamad)	4:21
10.	"Basag Na Salamin (Interlude)" (featuring Anygma)	9:33
11.	"Eh Ano" (featuring Thyro)	4:03
12.	"Thank You"	6:30
