= Marvin's Marvellous Adventure =

1994 video game

- Developer: Infernal Byte Systems
- Publisher: 21st Century Entertainment
- Designers: Florian W. Sauer; Janine Wagner; Manuel Rademacher; Steffen Buechner
- Programmer: Florian W. Sauer
- Artists: Thorsten Noogman; Tobias Prinz
- Writers: Florian W. Sauer; Tobias Prinz
- Composers: Nils Ruzicka; Thorsten Noogman
- Platforms: Amiga, Amiga CD32
- Release: Amiga: EU: September 1994; CD32: EU: 1995
- Genre: Platform
- Mode: Single-player

Marvin's Marvellous Adventure is a 1994 platform video game developed by Infernal Byte Systems and published by 21st Century Entertainment for the Amiga. An Amiga CD32 version was later released in 1995. It stars Marvin, a pizza delivery boy transported into another dimension embarking on an adventure to defeat an evil being known as Dark-One and rescue a professor who ordered a pizza. The player must traverse through 60 levels and search for items and power-ups, while defeating enemies along the way.

Marvin's Marvellous Adventure was created by Infernal Byte Systems, which had previously worked on Amiga titles such as Masterblazer (1990) for Rainbow Arts, Nebulus 2: Pogo A Go Go (1991), and Dimo's Quest (1993). The game's story was co-written by programmer Florian W. Sauer and artist Tobias Prinz. Its concept was to reproduce classic platform titles such as Hunchback (1983) and Super Mario Bros. (1985) due to Sauer and Prinz enjoying platform games. Production began in early 1990, the game was subject to periods where the team went to their university studies until it was revived for Amiga CD32. The soundtrack was composed by Nils Ruzicka and Thorsten Noogman. The Amiga version garnered average reception from critics, while the CD32 version received generally favorably reviews.

== Gameplay ==
Gameplay screenshot

Marvin's Marvellous Adventure is a side-scrolling platform game similar to Mario titles on NES starring Marvin, a pizza delivery boy. An elderly professor orders a pizza to celebrate the creation his latest invention, a brain scanning device. The professor takes a nap before his food arrives, but an evil being known as Dark-One tries to steal a piece of the device. The professor awakes to answer the arrival of Marvin, but Dark-One activates the device and fires it at the professor to make him disappear, but the ray bounces off until it hits Dark-One as well. Marvin eventually opens the door but trips over and falls into the ray, transporting him into another dimension.

The player controls Marvin by jumping and running in order to defeat Dark-One and rescue the professor as well as retrieving the missing piece of the device. There are six worlds in the game, each one consisting of ten main levels featuring their own variety of enemies and obstacles. The player collects items such as fruits and stars for extra points, while enemies are dispatched by jumping or performing a kick on them. The player can also collect weapon power-ups to fire at enemies.

== Development and release ==
Marvin's Marvellous Adventure was created by Infernal Byte Systems, a German-based game development team which had previously worked on Amiga titles such as Masterblazer (1990) for Rainbow Arts, Nebulus 2: Pogo A Go Go (1991), and Dimo's Quest (1993). The game's story was co-written by Florian W. Sauer and Tobias Prinz. Both Sauer and Prinz acted as map designers along with Janine Wagner, Manuel Rademacher, and Steffen Buechner. Sauer also served as the game's sole programmer, while Prinz and Thorsten Noogman were responsible for the artwork. The soundtrack was composed by Noogman and Nils Ruzicka. Sauer recounted the game's development process and history in magazine articles and interviews.

Marvin's Marvellous Adventure began production in early 1990. Its concept was to reproduce classic platform titles like Hunchback (1983) and Super Mario Bros. (1985) where players concentrate on the jumping and running aspect, due to Sauer and Prinz enjoying platform games. The team wanted the visuals and sound to be "cool", while concentrating their efforts on the gameplay to improve aspects they did not like in other platform games. Although programming routines were written in 1990, the game was subject to periods where the team went to university until it was revived for Amiga CD32, but the code had to be remade from scratch and the graphics needed to be redrawn for the CD32 version. The game was initially not planned to be large to justify a CD32 version, but was "beefed up" in terms of levels and worlds. The team also added special features that would not work on regular Amiga machines. According to Sauer, graphics were made small in order to display more sprites on-screen.

Marvin's Marvellous Adventure was first published for Amiga in September 1994 by 21st Century Entertainment, known for releasing pinball games such as Pinball Dreams and Pinball Fantasies (1992). The game was initially titled Marvin the Minx, but according to 21st Century representative Paul Topping, it was changed due to the word minx being a derogatory term. In 1995, an Amiga CD32 version was later released.

== Reception ==
Reception

Review scores
Publication	Score	
Publication	Amiga	CD32
Aktueller Software Markt	10/12	N/A
Amiga Action	N/A	82%
Amiga Computing	60%	N/A
Amiga Format	64%	50%
Amiga Power	26%	26%
Génération 4	N/A	51%
Joystick	N/A	72/100
Superjuegos	N/A	90/100
Amiga CD32 Gamer	N/A	72%
Amiga Games	69%	69%
Amiga Joker	75%	75%
AUI	88%	N/A
CU Amiga	85%	75%
The One Amiga	82%	83%

Marvin's Marvellous Adventure garnered average reception from the Amiga gaming press. Amiga Computing's Jonathan Maddock compared its colorful visuals favorably to early Mario titles on NES, highlighting the character's sprite animations, cartoon-esque backgrounds, and cutscenes. He also commended the Whigfield-style soundtrack in the Amiga CD32 version, but criticized the Amiga renditions for being cheesy. However Maddock felt the game eventually became boring, citing a lack of innovation compared to other platformers. Amiga Format's Steve McGill gave positive remarks to its controls, bright and colorful graphics, and scrolling. Nevertheless, McGill faulted the game for being tedious and the repetitive enemies. Amiga Games' Michael Erlwein found its playfield view as a positive due to the small sprites, but saw the game's short levels and lack of sound effects to be negative aspects.

Amiga Joker's Richard Löwenstein commended the game's visual presentation, controls, and varied design. Löwentein also reviewed the CD32 release, praising its CD audio. Amiga Power's Rich Pelley commended the game's playability and artwork, but criticized and lack of enemy and level variety. Pelley also criticized its lack of replay value. CU Amiga's Lisa Collins regarded it as a cutesy and playable platform game, but commented that it can be occasionally repetitive and noted its small sprites. Collins also reviewed the CD32 port, comparing it unfavorably with Beneath a Steel Sky (1994) and found the music irritating. The One Amiga's Andy Nuttall saw it as a traditional but fun platformer, commending its compact visuals and difficulty. A writer for Aktueller Software Markt highlighted its colorful Disney-esque graphics, easy controls, and animations. Amiga User International lauded Marvin's Marvellous Adventure for its colorful sprites and simple gameplay, but noted that it does nothing new in the platform genre.

=== CD32 ===
The Amiga CD32 version received generally favorably reviews from critics. Amiga CD32 Gamer magazine concurred with Erlwein regarding Marvin's small sprite, stating that they felt more freedom of movement but ultimately found the game to be bland and uninspired, citing the lack of personality of the main character and felt let down with its overall design. Amiga Action's Paul Roundell labelled it as a fun and playable platformer, commending the parallax scrolling backgrounds but compared Marvin's character unfavorably with the likes of Superfrog (1993), Soccer Kid, and Bubble and Squeak (1994). In contrast, Steve McNally of Amiga Power expressed disappointment with the game, criticizing its "poor" graphics and repetitive levels. Joystick's Léo de Urlevan gave the game positive remarks for its gameplay and visuals, but found it similar to other platform titles.

Superjuegos' Raúl Montón lauded the CD32 conversion for its colorful levels, imaginative worlds, catchy soundtrack, controls, and playability, but lamented the absence of sound effects during gameplay. Matt Broughton of The One Amiga regarded Marvin's Marvellous Adventure as one of the better platform games on theCD32, citing its music and controls. Stephen Bradley of Amiga Format shared a similar opinion as McGill, commending the smooth scrolling and colorful backgrounds but found the game to be dull and linear, noting its low difficulty. Paul Mellerick of Amiga Power gave the CD32 version a negative outlook.
