= Crossing Hennessy =

2010 Hong Kong film by Ivy Ho

- Theatrical release poster
- Traditional Chinese: 月滿軒尼詩
- Simplified Chinese: 月满轩尼诗
- Hanyu Pinyin: yuè mǎn xuānníshī
- Directed by: Ivy Ho
- Screenplay by: Ivy Ho
- Based on: Crossing Delancey by Susan Sandler
- Produced by: William Kong; Nansun Shi
- Starring: Jacky Cheung; Tang Wei
- Cinematography: Hang Sang Poon
- Edited by: Eric Kwong Chi-Leung
- Music by: Anthony Chue; Roxanne Seeman; Daniel Nitt
- Production company: Edko Films
- Release date: 1 April 2010
- Running time: 105 minutes
- Country: Hong Kong
- Language: Cantonese
- Box office: $439,766

Crossing Hennessy (traditional Chinese: 月滿軒尼詩; simplified Chinese: 月满轩尼诗; pinyin: yuè mǎn xuānníshī) is a 2010 Hong Kong romantic comedy film directed by Ivy Ho. It stars Jacky Cheung and Tang Wei.

Crossing Hennessy was a return to film both for Cheung, who had not appeared in a film for several years, and for Tang, who was banned from acting in mainland China after appearing in Ang Lee's Lust, Caution (2007). It is the second film directed by Ho (who began her career as a screenwriter). Other actors in the film include Paw Hee-Ching, Danny Lee, Maggie Cheung Ho-yee, and Andy On.

In May 2009, the film premiered at the Cannes Film Festival. It was also shown at the 2010 Hong Kong International Film Festival alongside Clara Law's Like a Dream as a kick start for the opening event.

== Plot ==
Loy is a 41-year-old bachelor who lives with his widowed mother and aunt in Wan Chai. Loy's mother, disappointed by his bachelorhood, often sets up match-making lunches for him with various girls. On the other side of Hennessy Road, orphaned Oi Lin lives with and works for her uncle and aunt in a bathroom appliances store on Lockhart Road. She is in a relationship with Xu, who is in prison. Her uncle, who disapproves of Xu, sets up a match-making lunch for her and Loy. Neither Loy or Oi Lin are attracted to one another, but the families continue to set up meetings for the two. After a few meetings and dates, the two eventually strike up a friendship after discovering a mutual interest in detective stories.

Both Loy and Oi Lin's families misunderstand the newfound friendship as romance and begin discussing wedding banquet arrangements. Loy explains to his mother this is not the case, and that Oi Lin has a boyfriend. Annoyed, Loy's mother calls Oi Lin's aunt and yells at her, calling her and her husband cheats. Oi Lin becomes upset with Loy, and breaks off their friendship. During this time she shares a flat with her boyfriend Xu, who has just been released from prison, and Loy gets back together with his ex-girlfriend Man Yu.

As time passes, Loy and Oi Lin grow increasingly uneasy about their relationships with Man Yu and Xu respectively. Loy tells Man Yu that he is finally in love with someone, but does not know if he is good enough for her. In the meantime, Oi Lin breaks up with Xu. Furious, Xu tracks down Loy and beats him up. Loy, though severely injured and no match for Xu, claims he is the better man because he can make Oi Lin smile. Xu finally understands, and leaves Oi Lin to get on with her life.

Loy's mother finally marries her accountant at the Cotton Tree Drive Marriage Registry to everyone's delight. After the wedding, Loy goes to the Cha Chaan Teng (where he'd previously had a date with Oi Lin) and finds Oi Lin. He joins her there, and the two enjoy the afternoon together.

== Cast ==
- Jacky Cheung as Loy
- Tang Wei as Oi Lin
- Paw Hee-Ching as Loy's mother—a widow and owner of an appliance store
- Mimi Chu as Loy's aunt
- Andy On as Xu—Lin's jailed boyfriend
- Maggie Cheung Ho-yee as Man Yu—Loy's ex-girlfriend who's recently divorced
- Lowell Lo as Loy's deceased father
- Danny Lee
- Gill Mohindepaul Singh

== Production ==
=== Filming ===
Crossing Hennessy was filmed from March to May 2009. The story mainly takes place around Hennessy Road, in Hong Kong Island's Causeway Bay and Wan Chai districts.

=== Music and soundtrack ===
The soundtrack album for Crossing Hennessy was composed by Anthony Chue. Jacky Cheung sings the theme song Bu Zhi You Yuan 不只有緣 ("Not Only Fate") ("Lucky In Love") over the end credits. The song was written for Cheung by Roxanne Seeman and Daniel Nitt.

== Release ==
Crossing Hennessy was the opening film at the 2010 Hong Kong International Film Festival.

== Reception ==
Mark Adams for Screen Daily wrote, "Crossing Hennessy is an engagingly fresh and enjoyable dramatic comedy that makes great use of its Hong Kong locations as it delves into the romantic complications of modern urban life."

Perry Lam of Muse Magazine wrote, "[Tang] exudes charisma and star appeal, even in jeans and sneakers, but I have no doubt that she could have stretched her role a lot further if the script had allowed her." James Marsh for Screen Anarchy wrote, "Tang Wei is a pleasant surprise, not least because she speaks her own Cantonese dialogue, avoiding that omnipresent niggle in local productions of sloppy audio dubbing."

Maggie Lee for the Associated Press wrote, "Supposedly a rom-com, it feels like Sunday brunch with an extended family in a noisy dim sum restaurant rather than a candle-lit dinner in a bistro." Alissa Simon for Variety wrote, "Ostensibly a vehicle for the two stars, pic forces their relationship to take a backseat to multiple subplots that detour the narrative through sitcom, melodrama and fantasy."

== Awards and nominations ==
47th Golden Horse Awards

- Nominated: Best Actress (Tang Wei)

17th Hong Kong Film Critics Society Awards

- Won: Film of Merit
- Won: Best Screenplay (Ivy Ho)
- Nominated: Best Film
- Nominated: Best Actress (Tang Wei)

30th Hong Kong Film Awards

- Nominated: Best Screenplay (Ivy Ho)
- Nominated: Best Actor (Jacky Cheung)
- Nominated: Best Actress (Tang Wei)
- Nominated: Best Supporting Actress (Mimi Chu)
- Nominated: Best Supporting Actress (Paw Hee-ching)
- Nominated: Best New Director (Ivy Ho)
