= My Destiny (Philippine TV series) =

2014 Philippine television drama series

- Title card
- Genre: Romantic drama
- Created by: Glaiza Ramirez
- Written by: Aloy Adlawan; Marlon Miguel; Glaiza Ramirez
- Directed by: Joyce E. Bernal
- Creative director: Jun Lana
- Starring: Carla Abellana; Tom Rodriguez; Rhian Ramos
- Theme music composer: Vehnee A. Saturno
- Opening theme: "Kung Hindi Ikaw" by James Wright
- Country of origin: Philippines
- Original language: Tagalog
- No. of episodes: 80 (list of episodes)

Production
- Executive producer: Rebya V. Upalda
- Production locations: Manila, Philippines; Singapore
- Editors: Robert Ryan Reyes; Noel Mauricio III
- Camera setup: Multiple-camera setup
- Running time: 24–41 minutes
- Production company: GMA Entertainment TV

Original release
- Network: GMA Network
- Release: June 30 – October 17, 2014

My Destiny is a 2014 Philippine television drama romance series broadcast by GMA Network. Directed by Joyce E. Bernal, it stars Carla Abellana, Tom Rodriguez and Rhian Ramos. It premiered on June 30, 2014, on the network's Telebabad line up. The series concluded on October 17, 2014, with a total of 80 episodes.

The series is streaming online on YouTube.

== Premise ==
Grace, a family woman meets Matthew and they become both attracted to each other. While Grace's sister Joy who has leukemia falls in love with Lucas, who is Grace's Matthew.

== Cast and characters ==
Cast

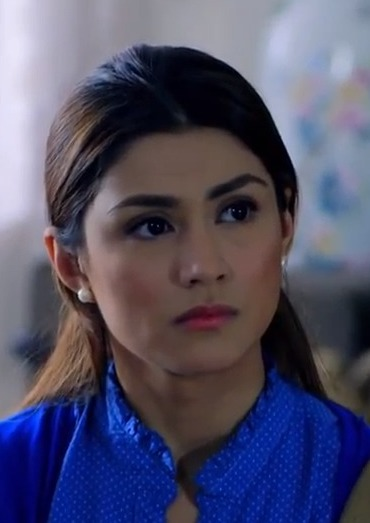
Carla Abellana

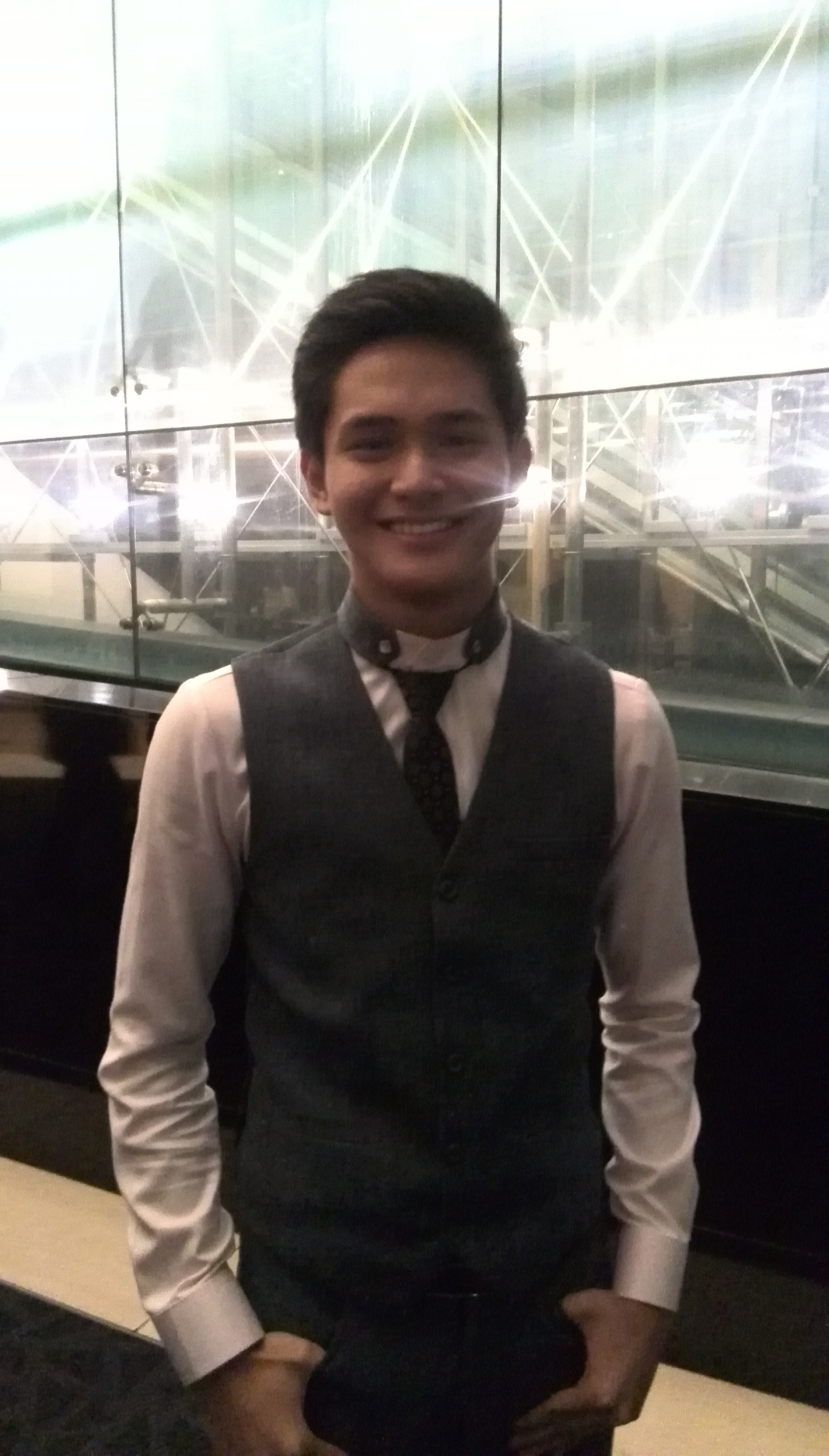
Ruru Madrid

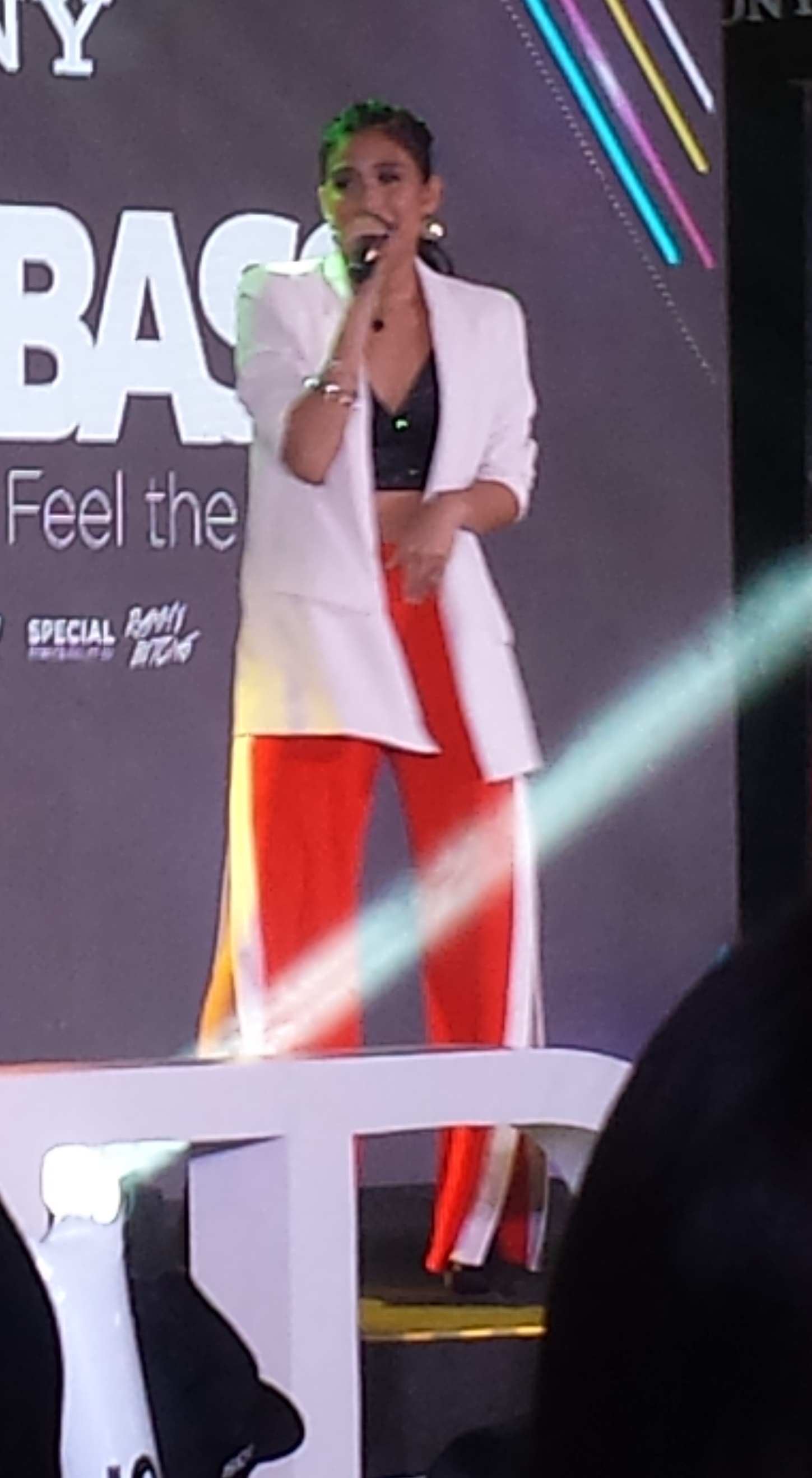
Gabrielle Garcia

Lead cast

- Carla Abellana as Grace Dela Rosa-Andrada
- Tom Rodriguez as Lucas Matthew Andrada
- Rhian Ramos as Joy Dela Rosa

Supporting cast

- Lorna Tolentino as Agnes Dela Rosa
- Sid Lucero as Jacob Perez
- Kuh Ledesma as Selena Andrada
- Al Tantay as Arnold Dela Rosa
- Ayen Munji-Laurel as Ruth Perez
- Dennis Roldan as Mateo Andrada
- Ruru Madrid as Paul Andrada
- Ash Ortega as Alex Martinez
- Gabrielle Garcia as Nicole Perez

Recurring cast

- Cai Cortez as Let-let
- Marc Acueza as Felix

Guest cast

- Veyda Inoval as younger Joy
- Angel Aviles as younger Grace
- Timothy Chan as younger Matthew
- Lolli Mara as Rebecca Dela Rosa
- Pauleen Luna as Janine
- Tessie Tomas as Obispo
- Melissa Mendez as Mrs. Arcilla
- Sabrina Man as Michelle
- Ervic Vijandre as Rocky
- Chariz Solomon as Dang
- Marnie Lapuz as Ching
- Vince Velasco as Drake
- Arianne Bautista as Anabelle
- Rolly Innocencio as Manny
- Lou Sison as Erica
- Nanette Inventor as Leonora Banal
- Prince Chromewell Cosio as James
- Alessandra de Rossi as Sandy
- James Wright as a wedding singer

== Ratings ==
According to AGB Nielsen Philippines' Mega Manila household television ratings, the pilot episode of My Destiny earned a 22.7% rating. The final episode scored a 27.3% rating. The series had its highest rating on August 28, 2014, with a 27.8 rating.

== Accolades ==
Accolades received by My Destiny
Year	Award	Category	Recipient	Result	Ref.
2014	28th PMPC Star Awards for Television	Best New Female TV Personality	Gabbi Garcia	Nominated	
