= Diwata (song) =

Single by Abra featuring Chito Miranda

from the album Abra
- Released: January 2014
- Recorded: 2013
- Genre: Pinoy hip hop, Pinoy pop
- Label: Artifice, FlipMusic, Ivory
- Songwriter: Raymond Abracosa
- Producer: Julius James "Bojam" de Belen

Abra singles chronology
"Midas" (2013)	"Diwata" (2014)	"Dedma" (2014)

Music video
- "Diwata" on YouTube

"Diwata" (lit. 'Fairy') is a song by Filipino rapper Abra featuring Chito Miranda, frontman of the Filipino rock band Parokya ni Edgar. The single released in early 2014, and the music video was released on December 31, 2014, via YouTube. "Diwata" is the second hit song from Abra after "Gayuma" in 2012.

== Music video ==
The music video features Abra and General Luna vocalist Nicole Asencio (granddaughter of late Vice-President Salvador Laurel). Abra plays a college student who is frequently bullied by his schoolmates, which then he meets Asensio. Later on, Abra befriends Asencio and develops feelings for her. This caused Abra to be bullied furthermore. At the end of the video, Asencio reveals herself to be a fairy or diwata to Abra. That was also the reason why Abra was always bullied; Other people could not see Asencio, thus making him look crazy and like he was interacting with a ghost. Chito Miranda also appears in the music video and plays multiple parts, such as a security guard, teacher, cafeteria staff, and a jeepney driver.

=== Cast ===
- Abra (protagonist)
- Chito Miranda (multiple roles)
- Nicole Asensio (leading lady/as diwata)
- Marlon "Loonie" Peroramas (as schoolmate)
- Ron Henley (as schoolmate)
- Adrian "Manny Paksiw" Sereño (as basketball coach)

== Reception ==
Upon its music video release, it was number 1 on the MYX Hit Chart.
