= Garry Cruz =

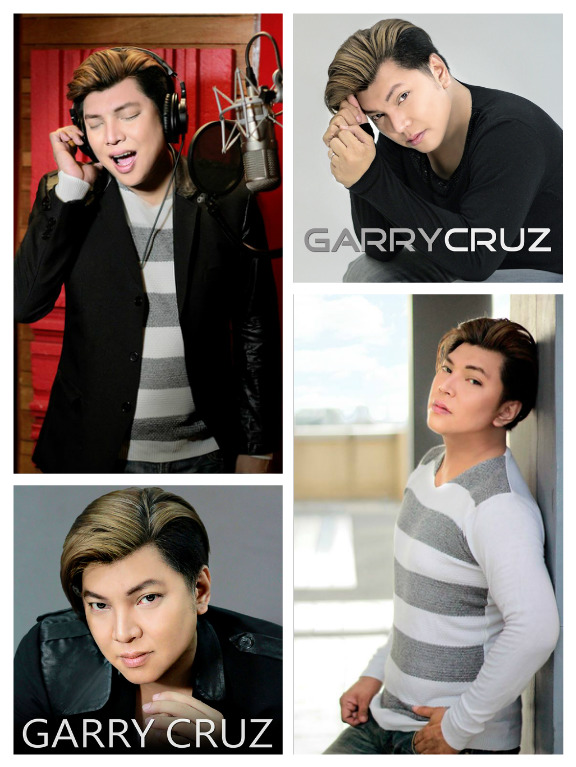

Background information
- Born: Gerardo Canlas Cruz; Manila, Philippines
- Origin: Navotas, Philippines
- Genres: OPM, Pop, Pop rock
- Occupations: Singer, Songwriter, Vocal Coach, Vocal Arranger, Host
- Labels: BMG Records Pilipinas Inc, BellHaus Entertainment Inc.

Garry Cruz is a Filipino singer, recording artist, songwriter, vocal coach and vocal arranger. Aside from his singing career he is also a dancer and has a background in acting. Cruz finished his studies in college and majored in accounting. He was also an elected official at the Sanguniang Kabataan as councilor in their Barangay during his teen years. Some of Garry Cruz's songs on his first album include Kung Alam Mo lang, and Kahit Mali Ang Puso. His acoustic version of Walang Yaman, Mas Hihigit Sa'yo is used as a soundtrack of the GMA7 action fantasy drama series Asian Treasures. In 2016 he released a new album on digital format. His current self-titled album Garry Cruz includes songs composed by Vehnee Saturno.

== Biography ==
Gerardo "Garry" Canlas Cruz was born at the Jose Fabella Memorial Hospital in Manila. His mother Margarita Canlas and his father Carlos Cruz have four children of whom he is the youngest. Raised in a small Barangay in Navotas Cruz studied at St. Paul Grade school for his Kindergarten and continued his elementary education at Gov. Andres Pascual College. He finished High School at Jose Rizal HS now Elisa Esguerra Arellano University and graduated at The University of The East Caloocan Campus where he took up accountancy. He became a member of his school choir. Aside from doing demos for various composers, Cruz was also a vocal coach and back-up singer for other aspiring and professional artists. He also entered into politics for a five-year office as SK Kagawad. After finishing school, he immediately pursued his dream to become a recording artist.

== Career ==
Cruz started as a session artist for multiplex tape and videoke CD's. He eventually become a demo artist for composers and a backup singer for some popular artists. He then auditioned for Polycosmic Koocooz, an in house all male singing and dancing group that was a rival to the Universal Motion Dancers (UMD). The group did not last long and disbanded without releasing an album. Cruz went back to being a solo singer. He worked with well known composers and artists and that paved the way for him to become a vocal coach. He also landed some bit roles in films and television.

Finally, he signed his first record deal after a DJ played his demo track of Bong Fernandez's composition entitled Kung Alam Mo Lang on the radio and it became an instant hit. Fernandez said that a lot of singers expressed their interest for that song but he only wanted Cruz to sing it. BMG Records Pilipinas (later Sony BMG Music Philippines) called him up and signed him right away for a solo album, along with Fernandez, prominent songwriters Lito Camo and Edwin Marollano also wrote a song and Albert Tamayo as the musical arranger to come up with an album entitled Kung Alam Mo Lang.

Since then, Cruz has toured the Philippines and abroad. He went to Hong Kong for a concert then had an extensive tour of the US and Australia With Imelda Papin. He represented the Philippines in Taiwan together with other delegates for a song writing competition as an interpreter and won as Best Singer. Megaworld International hired him to entertain their guests with Filipino songs in Singapore.

In 2016, he released a new album under BellHaus Entertainment Inc. and produced by Jeffrey Tan, the son of the Late Bella Tan. All the songs in the album are composed by Vehnee Saturno.

== Movies ==
Film	Role	Notes
Isang Lahi Isang Dugo	Rebel Soldier	
Takaw Tukso, Melodina	Singer	Movie Theme Song
Isusumbong Kita Sa Tatay Ko	Ghost Singer	Vocal track: Di Ko Kayang Tanggapin
Baklas:Human Organ for Sale (2011)	Singer/Songwriter	Vocals for theme song with Rapper Macoy and collaboration with Sherwin Castillo
Filemon Mamon (2015)	-	Vocal supervision on sound tracks

== Album ==
Year	Album Title	Genre	Notes	Label
-	Tunog Kalye vol.2	Pop/Ballad	For the songs Mahal Kita, Higit Sa Lahat and Ako’y Narito- tagalong adaptation of More Than You'll Ever Know and I Will Be Here	Dyna Records
-	Nahigugma Cebuano (Various Artist Visayan Album) vol.2	Pop/Rock	For The songs Ihatag Ko Ang Tanan and Kasing Kasing Kong Nagahulat	Able Music
-	Bag-ong Binisayang Labsongs The Album	Pop/Rock	For the song Kapugngan Ko Ba?	Harmony Music
-	Sama Samang Tinig Sa IIsang Himig	Inspirational	Album for a cause With Imelda Papin	IP Records
1999	Interscholastic	Rap/R&B	Duet With Francis Magalona	Greater East Asia Music and BMG Records (Pilipinas) Inc
2002	Next Beat: Song fest The Album Various Artist	R&B	For the song So Right..So Bright	Bread of Life Ministries, Inc.
2003	There's No Place Like Home (OFW Album) Various Artist	Ballad	For the song Kahit Ika'y Nasa Malayo	Galaxy Records Phil.
2003	Kung Alam MO Lang	Pop/Rock	1st Solo Album	BMG Records (Pilipanas) Inc
2007	Angat Navotas	Novelty	For the Centennial Celebration Theme Song	Navotas
20-	Unplugged	Acoustic	Cover Versions	D'Concorde Recording Corp.
2010	Inspirational Songs of Imelda Papin and Friends Vol.1	Ballad/Inspiratinal	For the Song Huwag Kwestyunin	618 International Records
2016	Garry Cruz: Self titled Album	Pop/Rock	2nd Personal Album (Digital Release)	BellHaus Entertainment Inc.

== Television ==
Year	TV Program	Role	Notes	Network
-	That's Entertainment	Dancer	Polycosmic Koocooz Dancer	GMA Network
-	Mara Clara	Party Guest/Cameo	Mara (JudyAnn)&(Gladys) Bday Party	ABS-CBN
-	Eat Bulaga	Contestant	Goldstar Karaoke Singing Contest	
-	Isang Tanong Isang Sagot	Himself		TV5
-	Sama samang Tinig sa Iisang Himig Telethon	Himself/Performer		RPN 9
-	Star Search sa Nueve	Himself	Chairman of the Board of judges: Grand Finals	RPN 9
-	Kakaba Kaboo	Singer	Kakaba Kaboo Theme Song	GMA Network
2003	Katok Mga Misis	Himself	Guest	ABS-CBN
2004	Walang Tulugan with The Master Showman	Himself	guest/singer	GMA Network
2005	Chow Time Na!	Himself	Guest Performer	RPN 9
2007	Asian Treasures	Singer	For the Acoustic Version Of Walang Yaman, Mas Hihigit Sa'yo	GMA Network
2008	Babangon Ako't Dudurugin Kita	Composer	For the Theme Song Kung Sana Bukas a collaboration with Tata Betita	GMA Network
2009	Rosalinda (Philippines TV series)	Singer	Vocals for the sound track Ikaw Na Nga Sana	GMA Network
2009	Goals and Girls	Composer	For the Theme Song Kahit Na a collaboration with Sherwin Castillo	GMA Network
2010	Asar Talo Lahat Panalo!	Himself	Member of Singing Group Sung-its	GMA Network
2010	Grazilda	Composer	For the Sound Track Nahuhulog Sa'yo a collaboration with Tata Belita	GMA Network
2011	Talentadong Pinoy	Himself	As Head Jury July 9, 2011 eps.	GMA Network
2012	Celebrity Bluff	Singer	For the Theme Song Celebrity Bluff	GMA Network
2014	Sunday All Stars	Himself	Commentary	GMA Network

== Awards and Accolades ==
Year	Award Giving Body	Category	Work	Result
2002	Star Search Marickville Rsl Australian Open	Singing Competition	Sung, How am i supposed to Live without you and Help	Semi- Finalist
2005	18thAliw Awards	Best New Male Artist	Garry Cruz Live Performance	Nominated
2005	12th Annual Asia-Pacific Excellence Awards	Best New male Discovery	Awarded	WON
2007	Sounds of the Human World (Taiwan)	Best In Talent	Interpreter: Where Is Heaven	WON
2014	33 Seal Of Excellence Award: Dangal ng Bayan for Music Awardee	Outstanding Song Writer and Performer	Composer/ Singer	WON
2014	27th Awit Awards	Best Vocal Arrangement	For the song Huwag Kang Bibitiw (Eurika)	Finalist

== See also ==
- Imelda Papin
- Francis Magalona
