= Abra (rapper) =

Filipino rapper (born 1988)

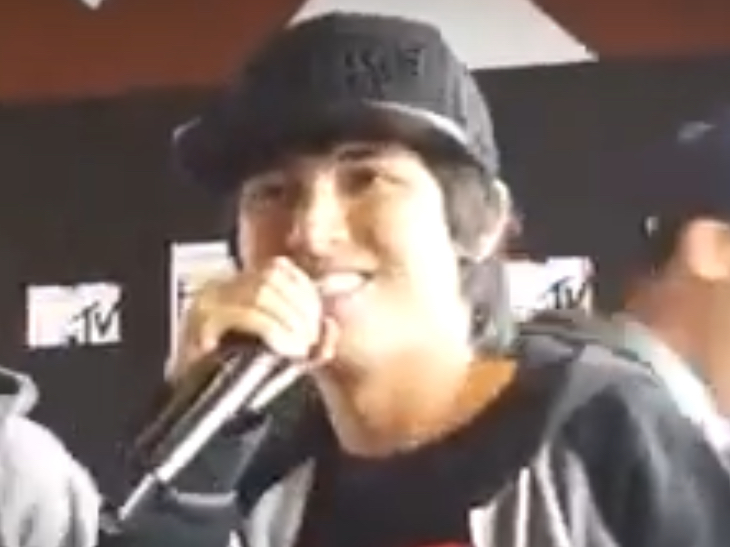
- Abra performing in 2015

Background information
- Born: Raymond Mikael Camino Abracosa; December 1, 1988 (age 37); Pasig, Philippines
- Genres: Hip hop; alternative hip hop
- Occupations: Rapper; actor
- Instrument: Vocals
- Years active: 2010–present
- Label: Artifice Records Sony Music Philippines
- Website: Facebook; Youtube; Instagram; X

Raymond Mikael Camino Abracosa (born December 1, 1988), known as Abra, is a Filipino rapper, hip hop recording artist, and actor. He rose to fame with his hit song "Gayuma," which gained significant popularity, reaching over 100 million views on YouTube by 2025. Prior to his rise in the music scene, he was already well-known as a battle emcee in the FlipTop Battle League.

== Early life and education ==
Raymond Mikael Camino Abracosa was born on December 1, 1988, in Pasig, Philippines. He is the middle child in a family of three siblings, with his father working as a professor and his mother did not have a background in music. His parents supported his early interest in the arts, enrolling him in painting classes and exposing him to various forms of literature and cinema. One of his significant early influences was the film 8 Mile, which introduced him to rap music.

He completed his high school education at Colegio San Agustin – Makati and later pursued a degree in Management Accounting at the University of Asia and the Pacific in Ortigas Center. By the age of 23, he had founded his own recording label, Artifice Records.

== Career ==
=== Music ===
Abra began his career in 2010 as a member of the Pinoy hip hop group Lyrically Deranged Poets (LDP) and joined the FlipTop Battle League. LDP's debut album, The Project, was released in 2009, and the group won Best Urban Group at the 2010 and 2011 Urban Music Awards. During this time, Abra also gained prominence in the FlipTop League, becoming a key figure in Filipino rap battling.

Abra gained prominence as a battle rapper, but it was his solo work, notably the 2012 hit song "Gayuma," that cemented his status in the Philippine music scene. The song went viral, reaching 20 million views on YouTube and becoming one of the most-watched music videos by a Filipino artist at the time.

In 2013, Abra signed with Ivory Music & Video and released his debut solo album in 2014. His YouTube channel, Abra TV, won the Best Music on YouTube Award at the 2013 Globe Tatt Awards. He also collaborated with Maja Salvador on the song "Halika Na" in 2014 and released the hit single "Diwata" featuring Chito Miranda the same year. In 2016, the music video for "Cerberus", featuring Loonie and Ron Henley and directed by Willan Rivera, won Best Music Video at the Myx Music Awards 2016.

After a hiatus, Abra made his comeback in 2025 with a new song "Kontrol". This marked Abra’s first release since his 2018 EP Hendrix.

=== Acting ===
Abra has also acted, earning the Best Actor award at the 41st Gawad Urian Awards for his role in Respeto, a film about an aspiring rapper. He has also appeared in Boy Pick-Up: The Movie and Kubot: The Aswang Chronicles.

== Discography ==
=== Albums ===
- Abra – self-titled album (released nationwide February 21, 2014)

==== Group albums ====
- The Project (with Lyrically Deranged Poets) (2009)

==== Extended plays ====
- Hendrix EP (2018)

==== Compilation albums ====
- Various Artists: Homegrown Hiphop (Universal Music Group, 2013)
- Various Artists: Juan dela Cruz: The Official Soundtrack (Star Records, 2013)

=== Singles ===
- "Abrakadabra"
- "Gayuma" (feat. Thyro Alfaro and Jeriko Aguilar) (2012)
- "Alab ng Puso" (Juan dela Cruz OST)
- "Ilusyon" (feat. Arci Muñoz) (2013)
- "Midas" (feat. Jaq Dionisio of Kiss Jane) (2013)
- "Bolang Kristal" (feat. KZ Tandingan)
- "Cerberus" (feat. Loonie and Ron Henley) (2014)
- "Diwata" (feat. Chito Miranda) (2014)
- "Sanib Pwersa" (feat. Raimund Marasigan) (2014)
- "Dedma" (feat. Julie Anne San Jose) (2014)
- "'King Inang Bayan" (feat. Reese Lansangan) (2016)
- "'Taya" (2018)
- "'Apoy" (feat. Shanti Dope) (2018)
- "'Stargazer" (with Gracenote) (2018)
- "'Liga ng mga bida" (feat. DJ Buddah) (2020)
- "'Pangwakas" (feat. Apekz, Mike Swift, J-Hon) (2020)
- "'Hipnotismo" (2020)
- "'Pantasya" (feat. Nicole Asensio) (2020)
- "'Kontrol" (44 Bars) (2025)
- "'Mais" (2025)
- "'Tarshey" (2025)
- "'Kry Bb" (feat. Haring Manggi) (2025)
- "'Olatz/Olanap" (2025)

=== As featured artist ===
- "ARÁL" - Loonie (with Apekz, Ron Henley)
- "Halika Na" – Maja Salvador
- "Halik sa Hangin" – Ebe Dancel
- "Isang Jeep" - Loonie (with Hiphop22)
- "KBTHN" - Ron Henley
- "Label" - Myrtle Sarrosa
- "Mine" – Pow Chavez
- "Peque" - Apekz (with Mikerapphone)
- "Tanyag" – Loonie

== Television and media appearances ==
=== Television ===
- Aquino & Abunda Tonight (guest)
- ASAP (guest)
- Bandila: Ikaw Na! (guest)
- Banana Split: Ihaw Na! (guest)
- Buzz ng Bayan (guest)
- Celebrity Bluff (guest player)
- Flashbook (GMA News TV, guest)
- Family Feud (guest)
- Front Row (guest)
- Gandang Gabi, Vice! (guest)
- H.O.T. TV: Hindi Ordinaryong Tsismis (guest)
- iConnect (PTV 4, 2012–2013)
- It's Showtime (guest judge / performer)
- It's Showtime Hide and Sing segment (TagoKanta Celebrity Singer)
- Kapamilya, Deal or No Deal (guest player)
- Kapuso Mo, Jessica Soho (guest)
- Kris TV (guest)
- Minute to Win It (guest player)
- Party Pilipinas (guest)
- Pilipinas Got Talent (guest)
- Rated K (guest)
- Sarah G. Live (guest)
- Sharon: Kasama Mo, Kapatid (guest)
- Showbiz Inside Report (guest)
- The Ryzza Mae Show (guest)
- The Voice of the Philippines (season 2) (guest performer)
- Tunay Na Buhay (guest)
- Wowowillie (2013)

=== Film ===
- Boy Pick-Up: The Movie, as fictional version of himself (cameo)
- Kubot: The Aswang Chronicles, as Benjie
- Respeto, as Hendrix

=== Music videos ===
- "Abrakadabra"
- "Alab ng Puso" (Juan dela Cruz OST)
- "Bolang Kristal" (feat. KZ Tandingan)
- "Cerberus" (feat. Ron Henley & Loonie)
- "Dedma" (feat. Julie Anne San Jose)
- "Diwata" (feat. Chito Miranda)
- "Gayuma" (feat. Thyro Alfaro & Jeriko Aguilar)
- "Ilusyon" (feat. Arci Muñoz)
- "Midas" (feat. Jaq Dionisio of Kiss Jane – Boy Golden OST)
- "Piña Colada Freestyle" - Prod. by Yung Bawal (Apekz, AGENT2K, DZ SVG, PRETTYMF9INE)
- "Pusong Dragon"
- "Rejoice Haba ng Hair" (for Rejoice commercial)
- "Rejoice Ikaw na ang Malupit" (for Rejoice commercial)
- "Sanib Puwersa" (feat. Raimund Marasigan, for Colt 45 commercial)
- "Wonderful Christmas Time" (feat. Sarah Geronimo, Bamboo, and Parokya Ni Edgar, for Globe Telecom)

== Awards and nominations ==
=== Music ===
Award	Year	Category	Nominated work	Result	Ref.
Awit Awards	2014	Best Collaboration	"Diwata" (with Chito Miranda)	Nominated	
Awit Awards	2014	Best Performance by a new Male Recording Artist	"Cerberus" (with Loonie & Ron Henley)	Nominated	
Awit Awards	2014	Best Rap Recording	"Cerberus" (with Loonie & Ron Henley)	Nominated	
Awit Awards	2014	Music Video of the Year	"Ilusyon" (with Arci Muñoz)	Won	
Awit Awards	2015	Best Album Package	"Abra"	Nominated	
Awit Awards	2015	Best Rap Recording	"Dedma" (with Julie Anne San Jose)	Won	
Awit Awards	2017	Favorite Music Video	"Label" (with Myrtle Sarrosa)	Won	
Aliw Awards	2013	Best New Solo Artist	"Abra"	Won	
Aliw Awards	2014	Best Collaboration in a Concert	"Artifice Unplugged" (with Rjay Ty, Alex Omiunu & Stick Figgas)	Nominated	
MYX Music Awards	2013	Favorite New Artist	"Abra"	Nominated	
MYX Music Awards	2013	Favorite Male Artist	"Abra"	Nominated	
MYX Music Awards	2013	Favorite Music Video	"Gayuma" with (Thyro and Jeriko Aguilar)	Won	
MYX Music Awards	2013	Favorite Urban Video	"Gayuma" with (Thyro and Jeriko Aguilar)	Won	
MYX Music Awards	2014	Favorite Male Artist	"Abra"	Nominated	
MYX Music Awards	2014	Favorite MYX Celebrity VJ	"Abra"	Won	
MYX Music Awards	2014	Favorite Music Video	"Ilusyon" (with Arci Muñoz)	Nominated	
MYX Music Awards	2014	Favorite Urban Video	"Ilusyon" (with Arci Muñoz)	Nominated	
MYX Music Awards	2015	Favorite Collaboration	"Dedma" (with Julie Anne San Jose)	Nominated	
MYX Music Awards	2015	Favorite Male Artist	"Abra"	Nominated	
MYX Music Awards	2015	Favorite Music Video	"Dedma"	Nominated	
MYX Music Awards	2015	Favorite Urban Video	"Dedma"	Nominated	
MYX Music Awards	2016	Favorite Collaboration	"Diwata" (with Chito Miranda)	Nominated	
MYX Music Awards	2016	Favorite Male Artist	"Abra"	Nominated	
MYX Music Awards	2016	Favorite Urban Video	"Cerberus" (with Loonie & Ron Henley directed by Willan Rivera)	Nominated	
MYX Music Awards	2016	Favorite Urban Video	"Diwata"	Won	
MYX Music Awards	2016	Best Music Video	"Cerberus" (with Loonie & Ron Henley directed by Willan Rivera)	Won	
MYX Music Awards	2017	Best Music Video	"Bolang Kristal" (with KZ Tandingan)	Nominated	
MYX Music Awards	2017	Favorite Collaboration	"Bolang Kristal" (with KZ Tandingan)	Nominated	
MYX Music Awards	2017	Favorite Urban Video	"Bolang Kristal" (with KZ Tandingan)	Nominated	
Wish Music Awards	2019	Wishclusive Hip-hop Performance of the Year	"Taya"	Nominated	

=== Film ===
Award	Year	Category	Nominated work	Result	Ref
41st Gawad Urian Awards	2018	Best Actor (Pinakamahusay na Pangunahing Aktor)	"Respeto"	Won	
