= 1096 Gang =

Filipino hip hop group from Mandaluyong

- Origin: Mandaluyong, Philippines
- Genres: Hip hop; Pinoy hip hop
- Years active: 2018–present
- Label: Independent
- Members: Guddhist Gunatita; Ghetto Gecko; Youngwise; Polo Pi; Luci J

1096 Gang is a Filipino hip hop group based in Mandaluyong formed in 2018. The group is composed of Guddhist Gunatita, Ghetto Gecko, Youngwise, Polo Pi, and Luci J. In 2021, they released their single "Pajama Party (Cypher 1)" which became a viral on TikTok.

== History ==
1096 Gang started releasing music independently in 2018, beginning with their track "Eat The System", which was uploaded on YouTube.

In December 2020, the group released "Pajama Party (Cypher 1)", which later became widely known after it was used in a dance trend on TikTok. The trend was picked up by several online creators and public figures. The music video accumulated over 40 million views on YouTube, while the track also reached millions of streams on Spotify.

The group followed this with "Buhay" (transl. Life) in early 2021. In May 2021, they released "Gawin" (transl. To Make), produced by BRGR and accompanied by a music video directed by Mike Gem Tolentino. Later that year, they released "Matsalab", (Note: A playful blend of matsala (backslang of salamat) and the English word love.) a track running over five minutes that featured verses from each member, and "Break the Loop", which incorporated boom bap elements and was released with a music video.

In 2022, 1096 Gang released "Di Sapat" (transl. Not Enough), along with a music video directed by Bj Tangco. Members of the group also released solo projects during this period. Luci J issued his debut EP Do By Heart, featuring appearances from other members of the group, while Guddhist Gunatita released solo material including the album Metamorphosis.

The group has appeared in live events, including performances at the 2024 UP Fair. They have also been associated with TMP Productions, a distribution network that works with independent Filipino artists.

== Members ==
- Guddhist Gunatita – rapper
- Ghetto Gecko – rapper
- Youngwise – rapper
- Polo Pi – rapper, vocalist
- Luci J – rapper

== Discography ==
=== Selected singles ===
- "Eat The System" (2018)
- "Pajama Party (Cypher 1)" (2020)
- "Buhay" (2021)
- "Gawin" (2021)
- "Break the Loop" (2021)
- "Matsalab" (2021)
- "Di Sapat" (2022)

== Accolades ==
Award	Year	Category	Recipient(s)	Result	Ref.
Wish Music Awards	2022	Wishclusive Hip-hop Performance of the Year	"Pajama Party (Cypher 1)"	Won	
