= List of My Destiny episodes =

My Destiny is a 2014 Philippine television drama romantic series broadcast by GMA Network. It premiered on the network's Telebabad line up from June 30, 2014 to October 17, 2014, replacing Kambal Sirena.

Mega Manila ratings are provided by AGB Nielsen Philippines.

== Series overview ==
Month	Episodes	Monthly Averages
Month	Episodes	Mega Manila
June 2014	1	22.7%
July 2014	23	22.5%
August 2014	21	24.6%
September 2014	22	25.6%
October 2014	13	24.8%
Total	80	24.0%

== Episodes ==
=== June 2014 ===
Episode		Original air date	Social Media Hashtag	AGB Nielsen Mega Manila Households in Television Homes			Ref.
Episode		Original air date	Social Media Hashtag	Rating	Timeslot Rank	Primetime Rank	Ref.
1	The Start of My Destiny	June 30, 2014	#TheStartOfMyDestiny	22.7%	#1	#2	

=== July 2014 ===
Episode		Original air date	Social Media Hashtag	AGB Nielsen Mega Manila Households in Television Homes			Ref.
Episode		Original air date	Social Media Hashtag	Rating	Timeslot Rank	Primetime Rank	Ref.
2	My Destiny at First Sight	July 1, 2014	#MyDestinyAtFirstSight	21.8%	#1	#2	
3	First Kiss from My Destiny	July 2, 2014	#FirstKissFromMyDestiny	22.9%	#2	#3	
4	My Destiny Kiss: Take 2	July 3, 2014	#MyDestinyKissTake2	21.0%	#1	#2	
5	Say yes, my destiny	July 4, 2014	#SayYesMyDestiny	22.4%	#2	#3	
6	First Date With My Destiny	July 7, 2014	#FirstDateWithMyDestiny	22.1%	#1	#3	
7	Joy and Her Destiny	July 8, 2014	#JoyAndHerDestiny	23.3%	#1	#2	
8	Grace and Her Destiny	July 9, 2014	#GraceAndHerDestiny	21.3%	#1	#4	
9	Hinahanap-hanap kita	July 10, 2014	#HinahanapHanapKita	23.8%	#1	#2	
10	Secret ni Joy	July 11, 2014	#SecretNiJoy	21.6%	#1	#2	
11	Secrets	July 14, 2014	#MDSecrets	24.8%	#1	#2	
12	Joy Tells the Truth	July 15, 2014	#MDJoyTellsTheTruth	23.7%	#1	#4	
13	We support you, Joy!	July 16, 2014	#MDWeSupportYouJoy	11.4%	#1	#3	
14	We Meet Again	July 17, 2014	#MDWeMeetAgain	16.2%	#1	#1	
15	Jelly Grace	July 18, 2014	#MDJellyGrace	19.1%	#1	#1	
16	Payback Time	July 21, 2014	#MDPaybackTime	23.6%	#1	#1	
17	Kiss or No Kiss	July 22, 2014	#MDKissOrNoKiss	23.9%	#1	#2	
18	The Bracelet	July 23, 2014	#MDTheBracelet	24.9%	#1	#2	
19	Araw ng mga Ex	July 24, 2014	#MDArawNgMgaEx	25.2%	#1	#2	
20	Aminin mo na	July 25, 2014	#MDAmininMoNa	25.6%	#1	#2	
21	It's Official	July 28, 2014	#MDItsOfficial	25.1%	#1	#1	
22	Buking si Letlet	July 29, 2014	#MDBukingSiLetlet	25.1%	#1	#3	
23	Lucas o Matthew	July 30, 2014	#MDLucasOMatthew	24.1%	#1	#3	
24	Bad Boy Lucas	July 31, 2014	#MDBadBoyLucas	25.5%	#1	#2	

=== August 2014 ===
Episode		Original air date	Social Media Hashtag	AGB Nielsen Mega Manila Households in Television Homes			Ref.
Episode		Original air date	Social Media Hashtag	Rating	Timeslot Rank	Primetime Rank	Ref.
25	Love is Sacrifice	August 1, 2014	#MDLoveIsSacrifice	25.4%	#1	#3	
26	Maling I Love You	August 4, 2014	#MDMalingILoveYou	25.4%	#1	#3	
27	Hello	August 5, 2014	#MDHello	24.3%	#1	#3	
28	Letlet Knows na	August 6, 2014	#MDLetletKnowsNa	22.9%	#1	#2	
29	Fight lang, Joy!	August 7, 2014	#MDFightLangJoy	24.8%	#1	#3	
30	Father's Dilemma	August 8, 2014	#MDFathersDilemma	24.6%	#1	#2	
31	Project Joy	August 11, 2014	#MDProjectJoy	23.7%	#1	#2	
32	Lucas, I love you!	August 12, 2014	#MDLucasILoveYou	23.7%	#1	#2	
33	Borrowed Bracelet	August 13, 2014	#MDBorrowedBracelet	22.4%	#2	#3	
34	I Love U2	August 14, 2014	#MDILoveU2	24.2%	#1	#2	
35	Couple of the Night	August 15, 2014	#MDCoupleOfTheNight	25.4%	#1	#2	
36	Paul and Nicole	August 18, 2014	#MDPaulAndNicole	22.4%	#1	#3	
37	Lucas Matthew	August 19, 2014	#MDLucasMatthew	24.1%	#1	#3	
38	Thanksgiving	August 20, 2014	#MDThanksgiving	23.6%	#1	#2	
39	Trials	August 21, 2014	#MDTrials	26.5%	#1	#2	
40	Plea for Arnold	August 22, 2014	#MDPleaForArnold	25.4%	#1	#2	
41	Patinding Duda	August 25, 2014	#MDPatindingDuda	22.8%	#1	#3	
42	Shocking Revelation	August 26, 2014	#MDShockingRevelation	25.4%	#1	#3	
43	Joy Versus World	August 27, 2014	#MDJoyVersusWorld	25.5%	#1	#3	
44	Desisyon ni Grace	August 28, 2014	#MDDesisyonNiGrace	27.8%	#1	#2	
45	New Bestfriend	August 29, 2014	#MDNewBestFriend	25.8%	#1	#3	

=== September 2014 ===
Episode		Original air date	Social Media Hashtag	AGB Nielsen Mega Manila Households in Television Homes			Ref.
Episode		Original air date	Social Media Hashtag	Rating	Timeslot Rank	Primetime Rank	Ref.
46	The Breakup	September 1, 2014	#MDTheBreakup	24.9%	#1	#3	
47	Goodbye, Grace	September 2, 2014	#MDGoodbyeGrace	26.2%	#1	#2	
48	Leaving on a Jet Plane	September 3, 2014	#MDLeavingOnAJetPlane	22.0%	#1	#4	
49	Looking for My Destiny	September 4, 2014	#LookingForMyDestiny	24.8%	#1	#3	
50	Grace Found	September 5, 2014	#MDGraceFound	26.6%	#1	#2	
51	Grace Meets Jacob	September 8, 2014	#MDGraceMeetsJacob	27.4%	#1	#2	
52	Start of Something New	September 9, 2014	#MDStartOfSomethingNew	27.1%	#1	#2	
53	I'm Here for You	September 10, 2014	#MDImHereForYou	25.1%	#1	#2	
54	Expecting	September 11, 2014	#MDExpecting	25.3%	#1	#2	
55	Grace Revelation	September 12, 2014	#MDGraceRevelation	27.6%	#1	#2	
56	Grace is Back	September 15, 2014	#MDGraceIsBack	26.8%	#1	#2	
57	The Announcement	September 16, 2014	#MDTheAnnouncement	25.1%	#1	#2	
58	Pamamanhikan Revelations	September 17, 2014	#MDPamamanhikanRevelations	26.7%	#1	#1	
59	Project Peace	September 18, 2014	#MDProjectPeace	26.1%	#1	#1	
60	Double Date	September 19, 2014	#MDDoubleDate	26.2%	#1	#3	
61	Grace Tells the Truth	September 22, 2014	#MDGraceTellsTheTruth	25.7%	#1	#1	
62	Grace Alone With Matthew	September 23, 2014	#MDGraceAloneWithMatthew	24.6%	#1	#2	
63	Friends Again	September 24, 2014	#MDFriendsAgain	25.3%	#1	#2	
64	All Seems Well	September 25, 2014	#MDAllSeemsWell	25.8%	#1	#2	
65	Don't Tell Jacob	September 26, 2014	#MDDontTellJacob	25.9%	#1	#1	
66	Truth Revealed	September 29, 2014	#MDTruthRevealed	24.3%	#1	#2	
67	Yes or No	September 30, 2014	#MDYesOrNo	24.0%	#1	#2	

=== October 2014 ===
Episode		Original air date	Social Media Hashtag	AGB Nielsen Mega Manila Households in Television Homes			Ref.
Episode		Original air date	Social Media Hashtag	Rating	Timeslot Rank	Primetime Rank	Ref.
68	Mahal pa rin kita	October 1, 2014	#MDMahalPaRinKita	24.4%	#1	#2	
69	Jacob's Decision	October 2, 2014	#MDJacobsDecision	26.4%	#1	#2	
70	Grace Tells Matthew	October 3, 2014	#MDGraceTellsMatthew	27.2%	#1	#1	
71	GraMatt Fight 4 Baby	October 6, 2014	#MDGraMattFight4Baby	24.6%	#1	#1	
72	Fight Lang, Daddy Matthew!	October 7, 2014	#MDFightLangDaddyMatthew	24.0%	#1	#2	
73	Family Wars	October 8, 2014	#MDFamilyWars	24.7%	#1	#2	
74	GraMatt, Fight Lang!	October 9, 2014	#MDGraMattFightLang	25.0%	#1	#2	
75	Maling Bintang	October 10, 2014	#MDMalingBintang	24.5%	#1	#2	
76	The Deal	October 13, 2014	#MDTheDeal	23.3%	#1	#3	
77	Free Grace	October 14, 2014	#MDFreeGrace	22.9%	#1	#3	
78	Finding Matthew	October 15, 2014	#MDFindingMatthew	23.9%	#1	#2	
79	Joy's Sacrifice	October 16, 2014	#MDJoysSacrifice	24.3%	#1	#2	
80	Finale	October 17, 2014	#MyDestinyFinale	27.3%	#1	#1	
