= Nils Ruzicka =

- Also known as: Mega'lo Mania, Plug'n'Play, So Phat!, Revil O
- Born: 9 October 1973 (age 52); Hildesheim, Germany
- Genres: Pop, dance-pop, pop rock, urban pop, rock, EDM, electro house, progressive house
- Occupations: Producer, musician, remixer, songwriter, programmer
- Years active: 1994–present
- Website: www.facebook.com/pages/Nils-Ruzicka/461448617267349

Nils Ruzicka (born 9 October 1973 in Hildesheim) is a German record producer, remixer, songwriter and musician from Hanover, Germany.

== Career ==
=== Early years ===
In 1993, Nils Ruzicka was discovered by Ramon Zenker. In his early years, Ruzicka created the techno project Mega'lo Mania in a cooperation with Zenker and produced a large amount of remixes and singles. Concurrently, he collaborated with the German-based DJ Revil O and they produced tracks and remixes under a lot of different project names, i.e. Revil O, Ravelab, Plug'n'Play, etc.

The first single of DJ Timo Maas was produced by Ruzicka in 1995.

In 1997, Ruzicka received gold and platinum records for his work on Bellini "Samba De Janeiro" which sold more than 5 million copies worldwide.

Two years later, the cover version he produced for the German dance project Lightforce of the hit single "Join Me" by HIM reached the UK single charts Top 40.

In 1999, during a recording session at Peppermint Park Studio in Hanover, Germany, Ruzicka got in touch with Stavros Ioannou. Together they created a lot of different songs and productions in various music directions and four years later they sealed a cooperation with the Grammy nominee and worldwide known producer and DJ Mousse T.

=== 2000–present ===
With their project called "So Phat!" they produced and remixed artists like Missy Elliott, Tom Jones, Simple Minds, Zucchero, Bootsy Collins, Warren G, Roachford among many others.

In 2004, their cover version of Vanity 6 "Nasty Girl" they produced for Inaya Day peaked the UK Singles Chart on No. 9 and in Australia the ARIA Charts on No. 18.

On the dance record labels Peppermint Jam Records and ProgCity Records, they released a lot of tracks which got heavy plays by various top DJs around the world like David Guetta, Moguai, Ian Pooley, etc.

2009 Ruzicka started another collaboration with the German producer and songwriter Mirko Schaffer and his company Vandertone. they worked for the top major labels on different artist up to this date, like Jason Derulo, Baschi, Cinema Bizarre, Joachim Witt, etc. The single "Unsterblich" of Baschi entered the German Media Control Charts and had its peak on no. 31 in Swiss Hitparade on no. 11. His song "Auf Grosser Fahrt" for the same artist was the official hymn for the European soccer championship qualification period of the Swiss national team and reached no. 24 in the official Swiss Hitparade, while the album for Baschi had its peak position on No. 2.

He also started out to work on music for Til Schweiger and his production company Barefoot Films. For the movie Kokowääh he produced a remix together with Schaffer and Schweiger for the song "Snowflakes" by the us band White Apple Tree, which reached no. 31 in the German Media Control Charts.

Since 2011 Ruzicka started a cooperation with DJ and producer Andreas Dohmeyer. Together they work on various production projects, starting with corporate music and ends with modern electro house music productions. they established the company "devilfish media", which earned a lot of great reputation since.

Early 2012 the worldwide smash DJ Paul van Dyk released the song "Love Ammunition" on his album "Evolution", which is co-written by Ruzicka. During this year he co-produced the comeback album "DOM" for the German artist Joachim Witt which peaked on No.6 in the germane Media Control Charts.

He also released a remix for the German band Die Ärzte and their single "M&F" which jumped in various dance charts into top positions.

2013 started out very successful for Ruzicka, since he produced another fine amount of music for Til Schweiger's Kokowääh 2 movie and also delivered a club remix for the single of "Castles" by Daniel Nitt. In summer of the same year he produced the single "The best is yet to come" for the famous German rock band Terry Hoax.

In 2014 together with his partner Andreas Dohmeyer he founded the digital dance label Devilfish Records and released the progressive house dance track "Christopher Blake feat. Jenny Karr - White Nights" as a first single. In a collaboration with female American songwriter and singer Jennifer Karr (Jennifer Lopez, ATB, Paul van Dyk, Lange, etc.) he wrote the song and produced it with the German EDM DJ Christopher Blake for his label. In the same period of time Ruzicka started being co-producer for the very known German dance producer SESA and they released their EDM single "AiAiAi" on Kontor Records. For this EDM track, they got major support by number one DJ David Guetta and many more of the international top DJs.

On the mainstream pop music department he started to produce the German female newcomer artist Sydney Eggleston. The first single "Hit that drum" got a massive response from almost all important German radio stations including "newcomer of the month" status at radio n-joy.

In 2015 he did the co-production & co-writing of Michael Patrick Kelly aka Paddy Kelly "Human". The album was released by Sony Music Germany on 15 May and entered the German media control album charts on #3.

2016 started out with the release of the album "Ruah" for the artist Michael Patrick Kelly aka Paddy Kelly which hit the German album charts on #12. In the same year he also produced music for Constantin Film and their movies Gut zu Vögeln, Radio Heimat and SMS für Dich. He co-wrote the song "La tortura della luna" for the international famous artist Zucchero which has been released on the album Black Cat which not only hit the Italian sales charts on #1 it also went gold in Austria and platinum in Italy.

== Awards and nominations ==
- Gold and Platinum Record – 1997 Bellini "Samba De Janeiro"
- Gold Record – 2010 Baschi "Auf Großer Fahrt"
- Gold and Double Platinum Record – 2017 Zucchero "Black Cat"
- Gold Record – 2019 Michael Patrick Kelly "Human"
- Gold and Platinum Record – 2020 Michael Patrick Kelly "iD"

== Discography ==
=== Albums ===
- Mousse T. "All Nite Madness"
- Colin Rich "I'll Wait"
- James Kakande "My Little Red Bag"
- Roachford "Word of Mouth"
- Gigantor "Jet Pack"
- Gigantor "It's All Cover Now, Baby Blue"
- Fat Belly "Turn The Amplifiers On (Alter!)"
- Die Prinzen "Die Neuen Männer"
- Baschi "Auf Grosser Fahrt"
- Michelle Leonard "Fragile"
- Simpletones "Simpletones"
- Joachim Witt DOM
- Michael Patrick Kelly "Human"
- Michael Patrick Kelly "Ruah"
- Zucchero "Black Cat"

=== Singles ===
- Mega'lo Mania "The Finest / Moonsign / Antasy"
- Mega'lo Mania "Emotion / Circulation / Ully"
- Mega'lo Mania "Close Your Eyes"
- Mega'lo Mania "Time / Love's Infinity"
- Mega'lo Mania "Circusclown / Tear It Up"
- Revil O "Little Little / Voice of Freedon"
- Revil O "Witness"
- Revil O "Stay Some Seconds / Tell Me"
- Revil O "Don't Stop / Charly"
- Revil O "Witness 2001"
- Revil O "Fly Away"
- Revil O "Free"
- Timo Maas "The Final XS"
- Secret Base "Warpmission / Obscurity / The Savage"
- DJ Rodd-Y-Ler "Mission Fulfilled"
- DJ Rodd-Y-Ler "Remember / Temptation"
- DJ Rodd-Y-Ler "Lifesigns / Prototype / Controlling"
- Ravelab "Seeing Is Believing"
- Ravelab "Send Me An Angel / I Can't Stop"
- Ravelab feat. Kai Hawaii "Push"
- Ravelab "Send Me An Angel 2001"
- Plug'n'Play "Oh Yeah"
- Plug'n'Play "Work It Out / The Best"
- Plug'n'Play "Helloween / Head Hunter"
- Plug'n'Play "Parade 2000/Warp 99"
- Plug'n'Play "Prophecy / Bodyrock"
- Plug'n'Play "Time To Bob / What Is Techno"
- Plug'n'Play "Do It"
- Sanity "Welcome To Paradise"
- Sanity "Welcome to the Future"
- Cytax "Deep Dream E.P."
- Unique "Stumpin' For Love"
- Anatol France "The Assemply E.P."
- Star Track "Megablast / Farpoint"
- Prefecto "Anything For Love / Full Pressure"
- Scoopex "In My Dream"
- Ham & Eggs – "Great Song of Indifference"
- Offcast Project "Into The Light"
- Offcast "Close Your Eyes 2002"
- Veona "Party Nation"
- Lightforce "Join Me"
- Mario Lopez "The Sound of Nature"
- Nu Love "Can You Feel The Love Tonight"
- Bellini "Samba De Janeiro"
- So Phat! "Into My Sound / When U Rock"
- So Phat! "A Love Bizarre"
- So Phat! "The Surface"
- Inaya Day "Nasty Girl"
- Mousse T. "Is It Coz I'm Cool?"
- Mousse T. feat. Roachford "Pop Muzak"
- James Kakande "You You You"
- Cinema Bizarre "Erase And Replace"
- Baschi "Unsterblich"
- Baschi "Auf Grosser Fahrt"
- William Hawk "Dont Let U go"
- Paul van Dyk feat. Michelle Leonard "Love Ammunition"
- Terry Hoax "The best is yet to come"
- Terry Hoax "Shining"
- Terry Hoax "Ready"
- HAWK! vs Point Blank "Identity"
- SESA "AiAiAi"
- Christopher Blake feat. Jenny Karr "White Nights"
- Sydney Eggleston "Hit that drum"
- H2WK! "Fireworks"
- Michael Patrick Kelly "Shake Away"
- Michael Patrick Kelly "Beautiful Soul"
- Michael Patrick Kelly "I have called you"
- Michael Patrick Kelly "Higher Love"
- Michael Patrick Kelly "Awake"
- Zucchero "La Tortura Della Luna"

=== Remixes ===
- Mylène Farmer "California" (Mega'Lo Mania RMX)
- Scooter "Move Your Ass" (Mega'Lo Mania RMX)
- Scooter "Back in the UK" (Mega'Lo Mania RMX)
- Scooter "The Age of Love" (Mega'Lo Mania RMX)
- Interactive "Living Without Your Love" (Mega'Lo Mania RMX)
- Jens Lissat "The Future" (Mega'Lo Mania RMX)
- Bellini "Samba De Janeiro" (Mega'Lo Mania RMX)
- Mr. President "Gonna Get Along" (Revil O RMX)
- Yosh Presents Lovedeejay Akemi "It's What's Upfront That Counts" (Revil O RMX)
- Dune "I Can't Stop Raving" (Revil O RMX)
- Dune "Keep The Secret" (Mega'Lo Mania RMX)
- Dune "Dark Side of the Moon" (Plug'n'Play RMX)
- Rollergirl "Luv U More" (Plug'n'Play RMX)
- Mario Lopez "The Sound of Nature" (Plug'n'Play RMX)
- Mario Lopez "Into My Brain" (Plug'n'Play RMX)
- Mario Lopez "Blind" (Plug'n'Play RMX)
- Stargate “Back In Time” (Mega’Lo Mania Remix)
- Missy Elliott feat. Ludacris "Gossip Folks" (So Phat! RMX)
- Tom Jones "Black Betty" (So Phat! RMX)
- Zucchero "Mama Get Real / Il Grande Baboomba" (So Phat! RMX)
- Mousse T. "Is It Coz I'm Cool?" (So Phat! RMX)
- Mousse T. "Right About Now" (So Phat! RMX)
- Mousse T. "Horny As A Dandy" (So Phat! RMX)
- Rosenstolz "Ich Bin Ich" (So Phat! RMX)
- Rosenstolz "Ich Geh in Flammen Auf" (So Phat! RMX)
- Inaya Day "Nasty Girl" (So Phat! RMX)
- Simple Minds "Different World" (So Phat! RMX)
- Supermax "Lovemachine" (So Phat! RMX)
- Warren G "Make It Do What It Do" (So Phat! RMX)
- Bob Sinclar "Tennessee" (So Phat! RMX)
- Michelle Leonard "Where Did We Go Wrong" (Nils Ruzicka RMX)
- Zweiohrküken OST "Without U" (Nils Ruzicka RMX)
- White Apple Tree "Snowflakes" (Til vs Vandertone RMX & Nils Ruzicka RMX)
- Die Ärzte "M&F" (PartyPowerUberMegaRemix)
- Daniel Nitt "Castles" (Nils Ruzicka Remix)
- La Bionda feat. Christina Hein - Come back to my life (HAWK! Club Remix)
