= Trip Lang =

Single by Shehyee featuring Sam Pinto

from the album Shehyee
- Released: 26 July 2013
- Recorded: Early 2013
- Genre: Rap; Pop; OPM
- Length: 3:02
- Label: Viva Records/FlipMusic Records
- Songwriter: Shehyee
- Producers: Bojam and Thyro

Shehyee featuring Sam Pinto singles chronology
"Fast Forward" (2012)	"Trip Lang" (2013)	"Inspirasyon" (2013)

Music video
- "Trip Lang" on YouTube

Trip Lang (English: Just For Fun) is a song by Filipino rapper and songwriter Shehyee from his 2013 eponymous album, and his first released single from the album. The song features Filipina actress and entertainer Sam Pinto singing the hook. It was released on 23 April 2013. The track was on a massive success locally in the Philippines hitting number one on several charts in the country. It was released on iTunes in April 2013.

== Reception ==
It was nominated as the Best Rap Recording on the 27th Awit Awards.
