= James Wright (singer) =

Filipino-Australian singer

James Wright is a Filipino-Australian singer formerly signed with GMA Music. He gained fame after joining GMA Network's reality-talent competition Anak Ko 'Yan on 2013. Wright received critical acclaim after releasing his self-titled debut album and is known his songs "Sana'y Ikaw" and "Kung Hindi Ikaw".

== Career ==
=== 2013-present: Anak Ko 'Yan and self-titled EP ===
In August 2013, James Wright and his mother, Gina, joined the 13 parent-child teams in GMA Network's Anak Ko 'Yan. The said reality-talent search showcases he talents of every child contenders from each team while the parents will guide their children to the path of success. In the show, James and Gina were dubbed as "The Heartthrob" and "The Survivor" because of James' good looks and Gina being a breast cancer survivor. James' music is generally influenced by jazz and RnB. James and Gina failed to win the competition but James later signed managing contracts with GMA Artist Center and E-Talent Management.

Wright's musical career started when ha sang the opening theme song of Marian Rivera and Alden Richards' drama series Carmela, "Sana’y Ikaw." The song also serves as the carrier single for self-titled debut EP, James Wright, under GMA Records released in May 2014. The album contains five OPM songs, with music and lyrics crafted by Vehnee Saturno. In an interview, Wright said that the album is dedicated to his mom. In May 2015, the album reached gold status. The award was given by the album's producer and composer, Venhee Saturno, on the morning show Unang Hirit.

== Discography ==
=== Extended play albums ===
- James Wright (2014, GMA Records)

"Ako'y Sayo"
"Babe"
"Kung Hindi Ikaw"
"Ikaw 'yon"
"Sana'y Ikaw"
"Ako'y Sayo (Minus One)"
"Babe (Minus One)"
"Kung Hindi Ikaw (Instrumental)"
"Ikaw 'yon (Instrumental)"
"Sana'y Ikaw (Instrumental)"

=== Singles ===
- "Sana'y Ikaw" (2014) (Theme from Carmela)
- "Kung Hindi Ikaw" (2014) (Theme from My Destiny)

=== Compilation albums ===
- Seasons of Love (2014, GMA Records)

Track 12: "Sana'y Ikaw" (Theme from Carmela)

== Accolades ==
Year	Award giving body	Category	Nominated work	Results	Ref.
2015	28th Awit Awards	Best Performance by a New Male Recording Artist	"Kung Hindi Ikaw"	Nominated	
2014	6th Star Awards for Music	New Male Recording Artist	James Wright	Nominated	
