= Kat Alano =

English-Filipina model, actress and television presenter

- Born: Katherine Anne Alano (Note: Kat Alano was born in England. Thus, she does not possess her mother's maiden name which is Brown.); Birmingham, England
- Occupations: Actress; host; VJ; model
- Years active: 2003–present

Katherine Anne Alano is a Filipino-British model, actress and television presenter/VJ in the Philippines.

== Early life ==
Kat Alano was born to an English mother and a Filipino father. She was educated at Gresham's School, Norfolk, England, and at the German Swiss International School, Hong Kong. She was born in Birmingham, England, then later moved to Hong Kong.

== Career ==
Before becoming famous, Alano performed in theatre in England, including William Shakespeare plays and West Side Story. When she came to the Philippines in 2003, she started her modeling career and joined GMA Artist Center using the screen name Olga. She even won the Miss Batangas competition in 2004 and that same year, she won the Studio 23 VJ Hunt along with Beau Canlas, Ayanna Oliva and Juddha Paolo. After that stint, she became one of the first official co-hosts of the variety show Wowowee. She later joined Studio 23's show E-Club. After winning the MTV VJ Hunt in June 2007, she was a VJ for MTV Philippines, as well as being the host for Cinema One's VIP Pass. She also hosted QTV 11's Fit & Fab in season two partnered with fellow MTV VJ Maggie Wilson.

After a brief hiatus in the UK, she co-hosted the morning show The KC Show with Kat on Wave 891 alongside KC Montero. She is now working on her musical endeavors, having already collaborated with SNRG on several tracks, she is now the Singer/Songwriter for Alikat, (https://soundcloud.com/alikat-music) as well as hosting her own podcast show on nmfnetwork.tv with Basti Artadi and Sib Sibulo called That Show.

In 2015, Kat launched her company, Diwata Yoga Mats, (https://lovediwata.com/). Her purpose with Diwata was to bring inspiration through art she created around the world.

== Filmography ==
Television
Year	Title	Role	Notes
2004–2006	Studio 23	Herself	VJ
2005–2006	Wowowee	Herself	Host
2006	E-Club	Herself	Host
2007	VIP Pass	Herself	Host
2007	MTV Philippines	Herself	Host
2007	Ysabella	Georgia	
2008	Uploaded on MTV	Herself	Co-host
2008	Eva Fonda	Clarice	
2009	Fit and Fab	Co-host	

Film
Year	Title	Role	Notes
2006	First Day High	Ashley	
2006	Kasal, Kasali, Kasalo	Sandra	
2006	All About Love	Elizabeth/Betchay	
2007	Sakal, Sakali, Saklolo	Sandra	
2011	In The Name Of Love	Jennifer	
2011	No Other Woman	Michelle	

Music videos
Year	Title	Role	Notes
2005	"Too Crazy"	South Border	
2006	"First Day High"	Kamikazee	
2007	"Break It To Me Gently"	Mark Bautista	
2009	"You Don't Know Me"	SNRG	
2011	"T.I.P.S.Y"	BOK76 and SNRG	
2012	"Gayuma"	Abra	
