= Celebrity Bluff =

Philippine television game show

- Title card from 2017 to 2018
- Genre: Game show; Comedy
- Created by: Marcelo "Loi" Landicho
- Developed by: Lilybeth G. Rasonable
- Written by: Senedy Que; Marcelo "Loi" Landicho; Manny Pavia; Tata Betita; Wilson Araya
- Directed by: Uro dela Cruz; Rico Gutierrez
- Presented by: Eugene Domingo
- Theme music composer: Tata Betita
- Opening theme: "Celebrity Bluff" by Garry Cruz
- Country of origin: Philippines
- Original language: Tagalog
- No. of seasons: 16
- No. of episodes: 213

Production
- Executive producer: Maricar Teodoro
- Production locations: Studio 7, GMA Network Center, Quezon City, Philippines
- Camera setup: Multiple-camera setup
- Running time: 26–41 minutes
- Production companies: GMA Entertainment TV; Uge Productions Inc.

Original release
- Network: GMA Network
- Release: November 17, 2012 – June 30, 2018

Celebrity Bluff is a Philippine television comedy game show broadcast by GMA Network. Hosted by Eugene Domingo, it premiered on November 17, 2012. The show originally featured Jose Manalo and Wally Bayola as the original "Gangnammms" (also known as "Celebrity Bluffers"), which later consisted of Celebrity Bluffers, Boobay and Brod Pete. The show concluded on June 30, 2018, with a total of 16 seasons and 213 episodes.

The show is streaming online on YouTube.

== Overview ==
In September 2013, Wally Bayola left the show after facing a scandal. He was then replaced by Boobay and Brod Pete who later became regular cast members.

In November 2015, Jose Manalo did not renew his contract due to scheduling conflict, at the same time Isko Salvador also left the show before the season ended. Manalo and Salvador were replaced by guests such as Betong Sumaya, Boobsie, Jerald Napoles, Ai Ai delas Alas and Pauleen Luna.

On February 4, 2016, the director of the show, Uro dela Cruz died. The show went on a break after on February 20, 2016. The show returned on June 3, 2017.

== Gameplay ==
Three contestants or couples attempt to outwit one another by answering questions to advance to the succeeding rounds.

In round one called Fact or Bluff, three players individually answer questions. The celebrity bluffers also referred to as gangnammmm will either help or trick the players by providing answers to the questions. The players have to decide whether their chosen bluffer's answer is a fact or a bluff. If answered correctly, the players get to keep the cash prize for that question otherwise the cash prize will be split between the opponents.

In round two "Word War", with the help of the clues given by the bluffer, the players will then race to solve each three word puzzles to advance to the final round. The first word is worth ₱5,000, the second word is ₱7,000 and the last word is ₱9,000. The player with the highest accumulated points moves on to the final round.

In its 12th season, they introduced a new segment, "Tough 10" on which the players should answer 10 questions only using Fact or Bluff. At the end, you should have at least 8 correct answers to proceed to win ₱500,000.

== Cast ==
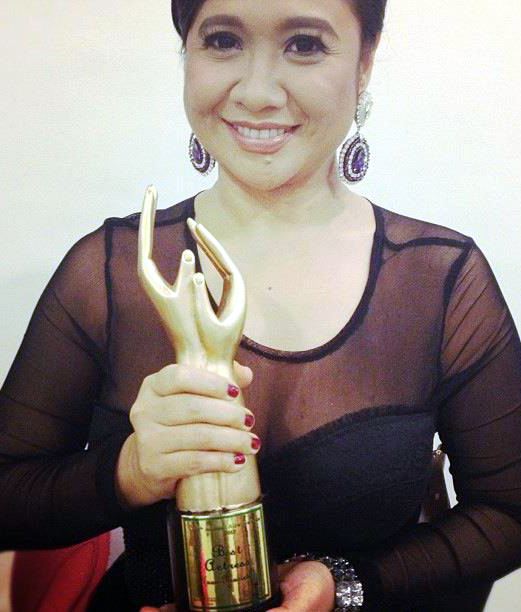
Eugene Domingo served as the host.

Host

- Eugene Domingo (2012–18)

Bluffers

- Wally Bayola (2012–14)
- Jose Manalo (2012–15)
- Boobay (2013–18)
- Brod Pete (2013–18)
- Edu Manzano (2017–18)

Recurring guests

- Boobsie Wonderland (2016–18)
- Donita Nose (2016–18)
- Super Tekla (2017–18)
- Jay Arcilla (2017–18)
- Dave Bornea (2017–18)
- Prince Clemente (2017–18)
- Jomarie Nielsen (2017–18)
- Nikki Co (2017–18)
- Arjan Jimenez (2017–18)
- Yasser Marta (2017–18)
- Kevin Sagra (2017–18)
- Ralf King (2017–18)

== Ratings ==
According to AGB Nielsen Philippines' Mega Manila household television ratings, the pilot episode of Celebrity Bluff earned a 16.5% rating.

== Accolades ==
Accolades received by Celebrity Bluff
Year	Award	Category	Recipient	Result	Ref.
2013	27th PMPC Star Awards for Television	Best Game Show	Celebrity Bluff	Won	
2013	27th PMPC Star Awards for Television	Best Game Show Host	Eugene Domingo Jose Manalo Wally Bayola	Nominated	
2014	Golden Screen TV Awards	Outstanding Game/Talent Program	Celebrity Bluff	Nominated	
2014	Golden Screen TV Awards	Outstanding Game/Talent Program Host	Eugene Domingo	Nominated	
2014	28th PMPC Star Awards for Television	Best Game Show	Celebrity Bluff	Won	
2014	28th PMPC Star Awards for Television	Best Game Show Host	Eugene Domingo	Nominated	
2015	29th PMPC Star Awards for Television	Best Game Show	Celebrity Bluff	Nominated	
2015	29th PMPC Star Awards for Television	Best Game Show Host	Eugene Domingo	Nominated	
2015	Asian Television Awards	Best Game or Quiz Programme	Celebrity Bluff	Nominated	
2015	Golden Screen TV Awards	Outstanding Game/Talent Program	Celebrity Bluff	Won	
2015	Golden Screen TV Awards	Outstanding Game/Talent Program Host	Eugene Domingo	Won	
2016	2nd Alta Media Icon Awards	Best Game Show	Celebrity Bluff	Won	
2016	Paragala Media Awards	Best Game Show	Celebrity Bluff	Won	
2016	Paragala Media Awards	Best Game Show Host	Eugene Domingo	Won	
2016	30th PMPC Star Awards for Television	Best Game Show	Celebrity Bluff	Nominated	
2016	30th PMPC Star Awards for Television	Best Game Show Host	Eugene Domingo Jose Manalo	Nominated	
2017	31st PMPC Star Awards for Television	Best Game Show	Celebrity Bluff	Nominated	
2017	31st PMPC Star Awards for Television	Best Game Show Host	Eugene Domingo	Nominated	
