= Gayuma =

Single by Abra featuring Thyro and Jeriko Aguilar

from the album Abra
- Released: September 30, 2012
- Recorded: 2012
- Genre: Pinoy hip hop; R&B; comedy rap
- Label: Artifice, FlipMusic, Ivory
- Songwriter: Raymond Abracosa
- Producer: Julius James "Bojam" de Belen

Abra singles chronology
"Abrakadabra" (2012)	"Gayuma" (2012)	"Alab ng Puso" (2013)

Music video
- "Gayuma" on YouTube

"Gayuma" (lit. 'Love Potion') is a song by Filipino rapper Abra featuring Thyro Alfaro and Jeriko Aguilar, son of Freddie Aguilar. The song is about a man in love with an ugly woman, implied as a transgender woman in the lyrics and shown literally in the music video, who learns he'd been given a love potion and takes an antidote.

== Background ==
The song was written as a metaphor for deception to show that "love is blind, love is shallow." It is not a reflection of the rapper's personal experience on love but rather his interpretation of love based on stories he has heard from peers, movies he has seen and things in the newspaper he has read.

== Music video ==
The music video shows Abra and his partner enjoying time together, despite friends and other people being against their relationship. Later on in the video, Abra realizes that the person he loves is in fact transgender or "bakla" after his former girlfriend (played by Kat Alano) revealed that the partner had used a potion to attract Abra. He later meets a pretty girl in a bar, and the pair start dating. After the girl goes to lean on his shoulder, his former transgender love interest suddenly appears to be the one at his side. At the end of the video, it depicts fellow rapper Loonie as having watched the "movie" on DVD.

== Reception ==
The music video was released on September 30, 2012 on YouTube. In its second week on YouTube, the video had already reached 2 million views, and by December 25, 2013, the video had reached 26 million views, the most viewed OPM music video of all time on YouTube until April 2018, when Ex Battalion's "Hayaan Mo Sila" overtook "Gayuma". Aside from this, the music video became popular because of the cameo appearance of Janica Buhain as a coconut juice vendor. Hence, she became popularly known as "Buko Girl" throughout the Internet especially in social media sites. The song "Kakaibabe" by Donnalyn Bartolome mentions the song, as well she mentions Shehyee's Trip Lang and Daniel Padilla's Na Sa 'Yo Na Ang Lahat.

== Awards and recognition ==
On March 20, 2013, the song won Favorite Music Video and Favorite Urban Video at the Myx Music Awards 2013.

== Live performances ==
In November 2012, Abra performed the song live on Gandang Gabi Vice. On February 24, 2013, a duet with Zia Quizon singing parts of the chorus was performed live during the opening ceremony for the Himig Handog P-Pop Love Songs finals night. He also performed this live at the Myx Music Awards 2013 with Quest, and on Eat Bulaga!, The Ryzza Mae Show, Party Pilipinas (with Julie Anne San Jose), Kris TV and Wowowillie.

== Controversy ==
The music video was viewed as homophobic by some but the rapper denies it and declares that it was not meant to be a diss towards the queer community but rather as a conversation topic for meaningful discussion.

== See also ==
- "Sirena" - the second most viewed OPM song on YouTube of all time, which is also related to LGBT.
