= Shehyee =

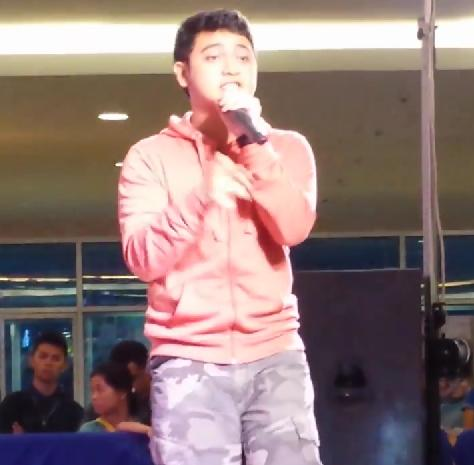
- Shehyee performing during a mall show in Iloilo.

Background information
- Born: Christopher John Rosales Ongkiko; February 13, 1992 (age 34); Mandaluyong, Philippines
- Genres: Hip hop, pop
- Occupations: Rapper, musician, actor
- Instrument: Vocals
- Years active: 2011–present
- Labels: FlipMusic Records; Viva Records; Believe Music
- Website: Shehyee on Facebook

Christopher John Rosales Ongkiko (born February 13, 1992), who records under his stage name Shehyee, is a Filipino rapper, songwriter and internet personality best known for his 2013 hit single, Trip Lang, and his participation in the popular FlipTop Battle League, where he notably holds the record of the two most-watched videos in FlipTop history, making him one of the most popular battle emcees of all time in the Philippines. As a recording artist, Shehyee has won once and has been nominated twice for the Awit Awards, and has garnered almost one hundred million streams across all platforms.

== Early and personal life ==
Shehyee was born Christopher John Ongkiko and raised in Mandaluyong, Philippines on February 13, 1992. Ongkiko graduated high school at Jose Rizal University

== Rapping career ==
Inspired by Eminem's alter ego "Slim Shady", Shehyee pursued battle rapping & rose to fame by joining the culture-defining FlipTop Battle League, that paved way for the emergence of the Philippine mainstream hip-hop movement. He won the Dos Por Dos tournament with Smugglaz defeating Abra and Loonie in 2012, cementing Shehyee's status as a local battle rap household name. As of 2022, the video of their battle in the tournament's finale has garnered more than fifty million views and holds the record for the most watched video in FlipTop's history. He immediately emerged among the "top rappers" in the country later that year.

After the breakout fame, Shehyee released his debut self-titled album named Shehyee on October 11, 2013. His debut single, "Trip Lang" was a Myx Top 10 chart hit as well as reaching the top ten in other local charts in the Philippines. It was a hit locally, reaching 14 million views on YouTube and a million streams on Spotify that year. His second single, "Inspirasyon", which is about a journey of a hopeless romantic guy was praised by an author as a "quality song". There have been several mall tours with the same name promoting the album. Shehyee released another single on September 25, 2014, on YouTube, entitled "Isang Umaga"; about a guy worrying about his relationship with his girlfriend (played by Meg Imperial in the music video). Shehyee and Donnalyn Bartolome also collaborated on a track entitled "Huwag Siya" in 2014. In July 2015, he won the first Spotify Emerge in Asia, by topping ten other artists from the continent, including Marion Aunor. The album's best hit "Trip Lang" was nominated as Best Rap Recording at the 27th Awit Awards.

Shehyee announced the release of another album in 2015, but the unveiling of this next album was delayed and no further announcements were heard from Shehyee's management ever since; but it was widely expected to be released in 2017. Shehyee released another single on December 19, 2015, on his label's YouTube channel, entitled "Samalamig". The music video was released three months later and featured Filipino comedian Kuya Jobert and rapper Zaito. On the same year, Shehyee & Donnalyn Bartolome dropped their second collaborative single entitled "Pag Siya" which supposedly was a sequel to their previous collaboration, "Huwag Siya" in 2014 that had twenty million views on YouTube.

On 2017, Shehyee and rapper Sinio became the talk of the town and gained controversy after their rap battle in which Shehyee's girlfriend Ann Mateo was mentioned and dissed multiple times in the battle in an offensive manner. Sinio later apologized after Mateo's mom warned to sue him. It became the second most-watched video in the rap battle league's history with 48 million views, trailing the 2012 Dos Por Dos tournament finale, featuring Shehyee also, by two million views. On the same year, Shehyee released the music video for his track "Bituin" & re-announced the release of his upcoming new album.

On 2018, Shehyee participated in the annual prestigious FlipTop's Isabuhay Tournament, where he came out as the champion against 15 other top battle emcees. By his victory, Shehyee made history by being the first battle emcee in the prominent battle rap league to become a champion both as an individual emcee and with a partner in the Dos Por Dos tournament, where he won with Smugglaz in 2012.

On 2021, Shehyee released three singles entitled "2020 Freestyle", "TAG", and "Aba Okay Din". He also re-recorded his 2015 non-album track "Samalamig", after it became a sleeper viral hit via TikTok. On 2022, Shehyee also re-recorded his best hit "Trip Lang" after it went viral again on TikTok after almost seven years, it was released under Viva Records.

== Discography ==
=== Studio albums ===
Discography
Year	Album	Label
2013	Shehyee	Viva Records/FlipMusic Records
TBA	TBA	Viva Records/FlipMusic Records

=== Singles ===
Singles
Year	Song	Album
2013	"Trip Lang" (feat. Sam Pinto)	Shehyee
2014	"Inspirasyon"	Shehyee
2014	"Isang Umaga" (feat. Yumi Lacsamana)	Shehyee
2016	"Samalamig"	TBA
2016	"Pag Siya"	Happy Break Up (Donnalyn Bartolome)
2017	"Bituin" (feat. Keiko Necesario)	TBA

=== Featured singles ===
Singles
Year	Song	Artist	Album	Notes
2012	"Hipon"	Sir Rex Kantatero		Parody of Maroon 5's "Payphone".
2014	"Tuloy Pa Rin"	Various Artists	ABNKKBSNPLAko?! OST	
2014	"Huwag Siya"	Donnalyn Bartolome	Kakaibabe	

=== Music video appearances ===
- "MasaRAP" (Schizophrenia, 2014)
- "Kakaibabe" (Donnalyn Bartolome, 2014)
- "Dyosa" (Yumi Lacsamana, 2014)

== Filmography ==
Year	Film	Role	Notes
2014	The Gifted	Batchmate	First film appearance.
2014	Talk Back and You're Dead	Piggy Gang	
