= Paolo Onesa =

- Born: Paolo Giovanni Plaza Onesa; 10 October 1993 (age 32)
- Origin: Zamboanga City, Philippines
- Genres: Pop; Ballad; Jazz
- Instruments: Vocals
- Years active: 2013–present
- Labels: MCA Music; Star Magic; HomeWorkZ Music
- Website: http://www.paollowers.16mb.com

Paolo Giovanni Plaza Onesa (born 10 October 1993) is a Filipino singer and songwriter. He began his career as a contestant in first season of The Voice of the Philippines with a live performance of the James Bond film song "Skyfall" that went viral on youtube and earned him a record deal with MCA Music, a Universal Music label. Onesa advanced to the semi-finals under Bamboo Mañalac's team.

Onesa received two Awit Awards for his performance of the song "Lucky in Love": Best Performance by a Male Recording Artist and Best Performance by a New Male Recording Artist. "Lucky in Love" is included in Onesa's debut album Pop Goes Standards and as a bonus track on The Voice of the Philippines The Final 4 album released by MCA Music. Onesa received an AWIT nomination for his performance of the song "Which Way, Robert Frost?" for Best Performance by a Male Recording Artist.

After his first album with MCA Music, Onesa signed with HomeWorkz under Jay R Sillona. He has been part of Star Magic.

== Early life and education ==
Paolo Onesa is from Zamboanga City on the island of Mindanao, The Philippines. The eldest son of Mr. Ariel Onesa and Mrs. Arlene Onesa his younger brother is Marco Onesa. Onesa was encouraged by his grandmother, who taught him music, to pursue a career as a singer. After attending a summer music workshop, he formed a band. The band entered a local contest and won. Onesa was a BS Mass Communication student of Ateneo de Zamboanga University.

== Musical career ==
On 6 July 2013, airing of Episode 7 of The Blind auditions on the first season of The Voice of the Philippines Onesa performed the song "Yakap Sa Dilim", a song that was originally recorded by APO Hiking Society and later, covered by Orange and Lemons. Coach Bamboo Mañalac chose Onesa to be on his team.

Onesa's live performance of the James Bond film song "Skyfall" went viral on youtube. Onesa's "Skyfall" charted the Top 1 spot in iTunes 24 hours after the performance.

During Week 5 Semi-finals, Onesa performed "Elesi" in a battle against Myk Perez's "Baby, I Love Your Way". The public vote was 51.92 points for Onesa vs. 48.08 for Perez, while the Coach vote was 45 points for Onesa vs. 55 points for Perez. The result of the total points was 103.03 for Perez vs. 96.92 for Onesa, and Onesa was eliminated.

On 14 February 2014, MCA Universal released Onesa's debut album "Pop Goes Standards". The album contains 11 tracks including two original songs, his single "Lucky in Love" and "Which Way, Robert Frost?", both written by Roxanne Seeman.

After The Voice of the Philippines, Onesa signed as a Star Magic artist and joined ASAP 20 a Sunday variety show of ABS-CBN. He appears in the segment "ASAP Covers" joining Sam Milby, Nyoy Volante, KZ Tandingan, Gab Valenciano, and Princess. Onesa also appeared in a Mid-Morning Daily Show The Singing Bee as a Regular Performer from September 2014 to February 2015.

On 25 February 2015, "Paolo Onesa Homecoming concert", Onesa's first solo concert, was held in his Hometown at WMSU Zamboanga City.

In 2016 with the release of his single Find You, Onesa changed his genre from crooner to EDM pop artist.

== Personal life ==
On 21 December 2017, Onesa became in a relationship with his long time friend, model, medical technologist and food blogger Pearl Mariam A. de Castro.

== Fan club ==
A fan club called Paollowers has more than 15,000 supporters. The fan club is handled by Loui Pestano Urbano who is now a vlogger at LOUI TV PANGASINAN LOUI TV

PAOLLOWERS came from Paolo Onesa's first name which is "PAOLO" and "FOLLOWERS" which means supporters.

PAOLLOWERS was one of the contender from the recent WISH FM 1075 Fandom Challenge which was joined by other famous fandom.

== Appearances ==
- RealTalk (27 April 2016) – CNN Philippines
- The Voice of the Philippines 1 (July 2013) – ABS-CBN
- ASAP 19 (January 2014) – ABS-CBN
- Minute to Win It – ABS-CBN
- Myx Philippines – ABS-CBN
- Umagang Kay Ganda – ABS-CBN
- It's Showtime (26 September 2013) – ABS-CBN
- The Singing Bee (September 2014) – ABS-CBN
- Gandang Gabi, Vice! – ABS-CBN
- Pambansang Almusal – NET 25
- Celestine, The Toni Gonzaga Concert
- ABS-CBN Christmas Station ID 2013 – ABS-CBN

== Discography ==
=== Single ===
- "Lucky in Love" from The Voice of the Philippines (23 September 2013)
- "You Are So Beautiful" (8 August 2015)
- "Find you|Find You" (25 April 2016)

=== Compilations ===
- "The Voice of the Philippines the Final 16" (1 January 2013) – Skyfall
- "The Voice of the Philippines the Final 4" (14 October 2013) – Lucky in Love
- "The Crossover Cafe II" – Which Way, Robert Frost?

=== Studio albums ===
- Pop Goes Standards (2014)
- Handwritten (2016)

=== Music videos ===
- Lucky in Love video released in 2014. It first aired in MYX PH and topped the charts for both the MYX Hit Chart and Pinoy MYX Countdown.
- You Are So Beautiful video released on 18 July 2015. It first aired in MYX PH.

Rank	Title of the song	Date	Week
No. 13	You Are So Beautiful	23 August 2015	4th week
No. 15	You Are So Beautiful	16 August 2015	3rd week
No. 15	You Are So Beautiful	9 August 2015	2nd week
No. 17	You Are So Beautiful	2 August 2015	1st week

== Magazine Featured article ==
- "Scene Zone" (May 2016 Issue)
- Pinoy Magazine (February 2014 Issue)
- Pinoy Magazine (April 2014 Issue)
- Pinoy Magazine (August 2014 Issue)
- Pinoy Magazine (December 2014 Issue)
- "Chalk Magazine" (December 2014 Issie)

== Awards and nominations ==
Year	Award	Category	Notable work	Result
2014	27th Awit Awards	Best Performance by A Male Recording Artist	Lucky in Love	Won
2014	27th Awit Awards	Best Performance by A New Male Recording Artist	Lucky in Love	Won
2015	28th Awit Awards	Best Performance by A Male Recording Artist	Which Way, Robert Frost?	Nominated
2016	Wish FM Awards	Best WISHclusive Performance – Male Artist	You Are So Beautiful?	Nominated

The AWIT Awards, equivalent of the Grammy Award in The Philippines, occurred on 12 December 2014.
