= Lucky in Love (Jacky Cheung song) =

2010 song by Paolo Onesa

Song by Jacky Cheung

from the album Private Corner
- Released: January 29, 2010
- Studio: IOI Limited Studio (Hong Kong)
- Genre: Jazz; Canto-jazz
- Length: 4:40
- Label: Universal Music
- Songwriters: Roxanne Seeman; Daniel Nitt; Kenny So (Qiao Xing)
- Producer: Andrew Tuason (杜自持)

Music video
- "Bu Zhi You Yuan (Lucky in Love)" (不只有緣) on YouTube

"Lucky in Love" (Chinese: 不只有緣) is a song by Hong Kong singer and actor Jacky Cheung. It is the theme song of the 2010 Hong Kong film Crossing Hennessy. The song was written by Roxanne Seeman and Daniel Nitt with Cantonese lyrics by Kenny So (Qiao Xing 乔星). It was produced by Andrew Tuason (杜自持) in Hong Kong and released on Cheung's Private Corner album on January 29, 2010.

Cheung sings "不只有緣 (Lucky in Love)" over the end-credits of the Hong Kong movie Crossing Hennessy starring Tang Wei and Jacky Cheung and produced by William Kong. The film premiered as the opening night film for the 34th Hong Kong International Film Festival March 21, 2010.

== Crossing Hennessy ==
"Not Only Fate (Lucky In Love)" is a love song that Cheung sings at the end of the movie "Crossing Hennessy", a story of two people living on the same street in Hong Kong, who met on an embarrassing blind date arranged by their families. The lyrics of the song express the loneliness that people feel living in an urban city, and how love can be so close for two people living on the same street yet not knowing it, be so distant. Despite being in the midst of the loneliness and alienation of the modern world they live in, their love develops from acquaintances into a budding romance.

During the promotional activities of the film Cheung was heard humming the song to himself.

== Composition and lyrics ==
"不只有緣 (Lucky in Love)" was written by Seeman and Nitt for Jacky Cheung's "Private Corner" canto-jazz album. They composed and recorded the demo of the song over the internet between Los Angeles and Berlin. Cheung requested a revision of the rhythm of the melody and chords of the original song arrangement. His recording repeats the intro as an outro.

== Critical reception ==
Tencent praised "the melodious melody" and "lyrics that fit the mood of the characters as being in line with the film style" remarking that the song "is deeply loved by the male protagonist Jacky Cheung". Jerry Ho of Tencent credited the "tasteful lyrics" of a "soft love song" and opined "it is not difficult to find the subtle connection of the song and the movie." Netease lauded the "refreshing use of the string quartet" and Cheung's "multi-angle observation of the living environment around him...indulging in love."

== Credits and personnel ==
Credits are adapted from the album's liner notes.

- Jacky Cheung – lead vocals
- Andrew Tuason (杜自持)– producer, string arranger, conductor, bass
- Daniel Nitt – arranger, piano
- Lydia Chew and group – backing vocals
- Lewis Pragasam – drums
- Anna Kwan, Kaori Wilson, Leslie Ryang, Miyaka S. Wilson - strings

== Paolo Onesa version ==
"Lucky In Love"

Single by Paolo Onesa

from the album Pop Goes Standards & The Voice of the Philippines
- Released: September 23, 2013
- Genre: Ballad
- Length: 4:13
- Label: MCA Music, Inc.
- Songwriters: Roxanne Seeman; Daniel Nitt
- Producer: Francis Guevarra

Paolo Onesa singles chronology
"Lucky In Love" (2013)	"You Are So Beautiful" (2015)

Music video
- "Lucky in Love" on YouTube

An original English version of "不只有緣 (Lucky In Love)" was recorded by Paolo Onesa, Top 8 contestant from the first season of The Voice of the Philippines. It was released digitally as a single on September 23, 2013 by MCA Music, as part of The Voice of The Philippines compilation album.

The song was included in Onesa's debut album Pop Goes Standards released February 14, 2014. It was also a bonus track on The Voice of the Philippines The Final 4 album released by MCA Music.

=== Awards ===
Paolo Onesa received two Awit Awards for his performance of "Lucky In Love" at the 28th Awit Awards, December 12, 2014.

- Best Performance by A Male Recording Artist
- Best Performance by A New Male Recording Artist
