= Daniel Nitt =

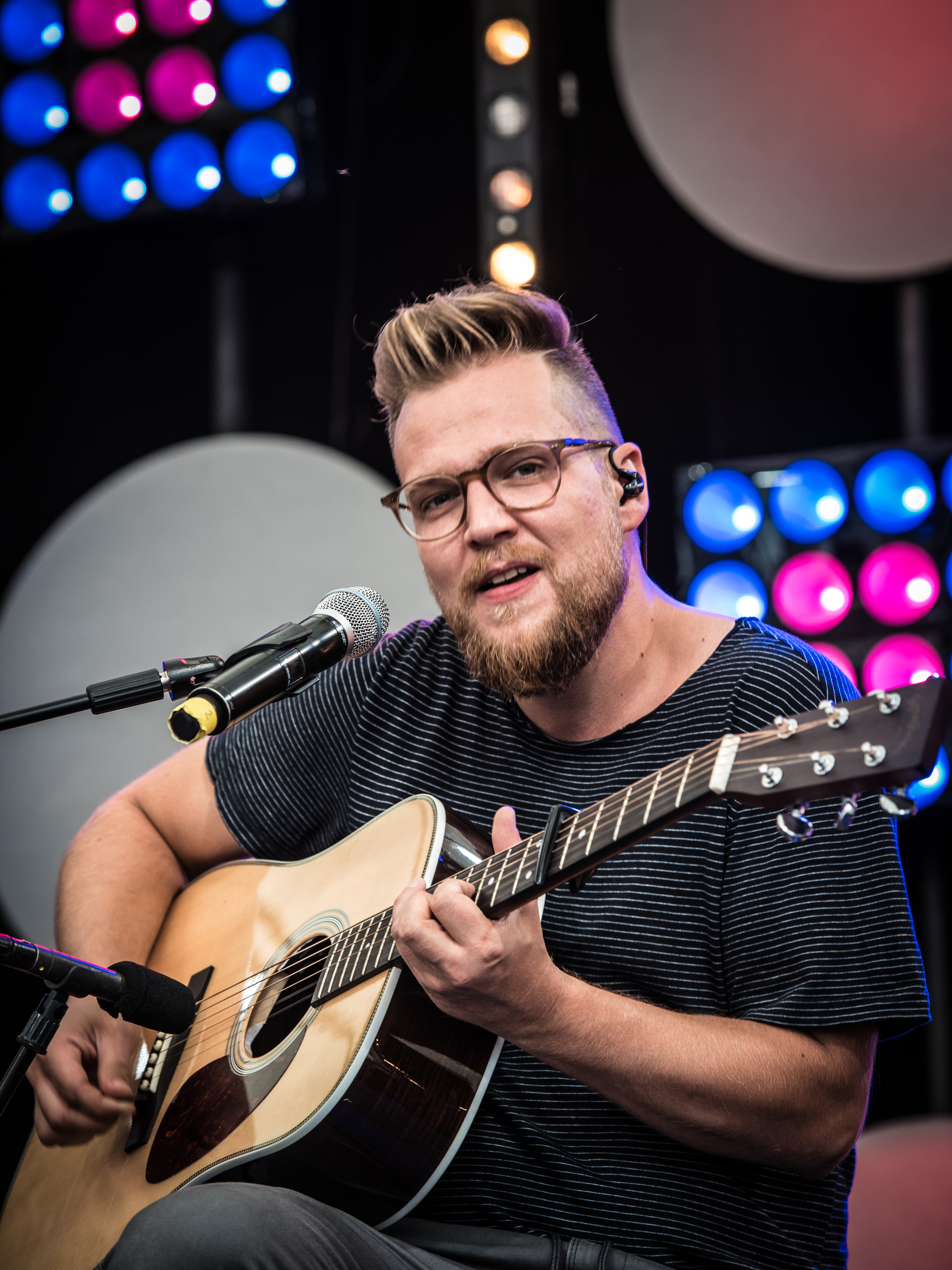
- Nitt in 2016

Background information
- Born: Daniel Mario Nitt; 29 October 1981 (age 44)
- Origin: Pegnitz, Germany
- Genres: Pop, dance-pop, pop rock, urban pop
- Occupations: songwriter producer singer composer
- Years active: 2005 – present

Daniel Nitt is a German recording artist, songwriter, music producer, and composer. Daniel Nitt was born in Pegnitz, Germany and currently resides in Berlin, Germany.

== Songwriting and film composing career ==
Daniel Nitt co-wrote "不只有緣 (Lucky in Love)" with Roxanne Seeman for Jacky Cheung, China's No. 1 Pop Icon. "不只有緣 (Lucky in Love)" appears over the end-credits of "Crossing Hennessy", Hong Kong movie produced by William Kong. "Crossing Hennessy", starring Tang Wei (Lust, Caution) and Jacky Cheung. The film was the opening night film for the 34th Hong Kong International Film Festival 21 March.

"不只有緣 (Lucky in Love)" is included on Jacky Cheung's "Private Corner" album which went platinum in less than a week. The song was covered by Filipino singer Paolo Onesa.

Daniel co-composed and co-produced the score for the soundtrack to Til Schweiger's new German blockbuster movie, "Zweiohrküken (Rabbits Without Ears 2)" with Dirk Reichardt and Mirko Schaffer. Nitt, Reichardt and Schaffer wrote the original song, "Sleepless", which Nitt performs. The soundtrack went gold.

In January 2010, Nitt and Seeman attended the Jacky Cheung "Private Corner" Press Conference held by Universal Music in Hong Kong at the Kowloon Shangri-La. Jacky Cheung, Roxanne Seeman, and Daniel Nitt were interviewed by Guinness book world record holder Uncle Ray (Ray Cordeiro), a famous Hong Kong radio talk show host, on 29 January.

He helped write electronic musician BT's song "I Will Be Yours" for the album The Lost Art of Longing in 2020.
