= 28th Awit Awards =

2015 Philippine music awards ceremony

- Date: December 9, 2015
- Location: Music Museum, Greenhills, San Juan

Television/radio coverage
- Produced by: Laurel Media Company

The 28th Awit Awards were held at Music Museum in Greenhills, San Juan. They honored the best of Filipino music for the year 2014. It was originally scheduled on August 25, 2015 but due to unforeseen technical problems and inclement weather brought by Typhoon Ineng, it was postponed to December 9, 2015.

== Winners and nominees ==
Winners are listed first and highlighted in bold. Nominated producers, composers and lyricists are not included in this list, unless noted. For the full list, please go to their official website.

=== Performance Awards ===
Best Performance by a Female Recording Artist	Best Performance by a Male Recording Artist
**"Never Knew Love (Until I Met You)" – Janice Javier**; "Love Me Instead" – Moira Dela Torre; "Kilometro" – Sarah Geronimo; "Weekend with You" – Krissy; "Salbabida" – Kyla	**"Buntong-Hininga" – Johnoy Danao**; "Which Way, Robert Frost?" – Paolo Onesa; "Honey Under the Moon" – Myk Perez; "Kapalaran" – Gary Valenciano; "Saytay" – Gary Valenciano
Best Performance by a Group Recording Artists	Best Performance by a New Female Recording Artist
**"Krismas Na" – Koro Ilustrado**; "May I Have This Dance" – The Company; "Spin & Fall" – Franco; "Love Is Killing Me" – Generation; "Hatid Sundo" – Gimme 5	**"Dear Heart" – Kiana Valenciano**; "Akin Ka Na Lang" – Morissette; "Heart Song" – Mica Javier; "Love Me Instead" – Moira Dela Torre; "Tulala" – Joyce Pring
Best Performance by a New Male Recording Artist	Best Performance by a New Group Recording Artists
**"In Love Ako Sa 'Yo"** – Darren Espanto; "Pare Mahal Mo Raw Ako" – Michael Pangilinan; "Ready Ka Na Ba?" – Kito Romualdez; "Muling Magbabalik" – Paolo Valenciano; "Kung Hindi Ikaw" – James Wright	**"Paano" – Innervoices**; "Pinoy Ako" – ABS-CBN Philharmonic Orchestra; "Tayo Pa Kaya" – Crazy as Pinoy; "Love Is Killing Me" – Generation; "Ako’y Tinamaan" – Reo Brothers
Best Performance by a Child/Children Recording Artist/s	Best Collaboration
**Narito Ako" – Lyca Gairanod**; "Dance with My Father" – Tonton Cabiles	**"May Bukas Pa" – Lani Misalucha feat. Angeline Quinto,** **KZ Tandingan & Yeng Constantino**; "Hope for Humanity" – MCA All-Star; "Sino Ka Ba?" – Klarisse de Guzman feat. Nyoy Volante; "O Come, All Ye Faithful" – Basil Valdez & the Philippine Madrigal Singers; "Kapantay ay Langit" – Pilita Corrales & Basil Valdez
