= Sam Pinto =

Filipino actress (born 1989)

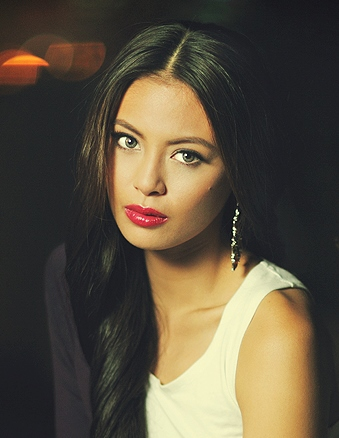
- Pinto in 2012
- Born: Samuelle Lynne Acosta Pinto; December 11, 1989 (age 36); Ormoc, Leyte, Philippines
- Occupations: Actress; model; singer; VJ
- Years active: 2009–2020; 2023–present
- Agents: Star Magic Sparkle GMA Artist Center Viva Artists Agency V Management Group; Talent5
- Known for: Pinoy Big Brother: Double Up; FHMs 100 Sexiest Woman
- Height: 1.73 m (5 ft 8 in)
- Spouse: Anthony Semerad (m. 2021)
- Children: 1
- Modelling information
- Hair colour: Black
- Eye colour: Brown

Samuelle Lynne Acosta Pinto-Semerad (born December 11, 1989) is a Filipino actress, model, singer, and video jockey (VJ).

== Career ==
=== Modelling career ===
Pinto began her career as a print advertisement and television commercial model. At age 10, she landed her first modeling job, appearing in posters for Coca-Cola. Her subsequent campaigns included brands such as Sunsilk, Smart, Voice Combo Sandwich, Colgate, Palmolive, and McDonald's. She later became an endorser for the clothing brand BAYO.

=== Pinoy Big Brother ===
Pinto gained national recognition after joining the reality television series Pinoy Big Brother: Double Up in 2009. Initially assigned to House B, she transferred to House A after one week. Surviving multiple eviction votes, she was eventually evicted on January 9, 2010.

=== Early TV appearances ===
Prior to her reality television stint, Pinto appeared in a 2008 episode of GMA Network's drama anthology Maynila alongside Mark Herras. She was also a finalist in Myx VJ Search 2008 and later secured her first regular role in TV5's supernatural series Midnight DJ (Season 4), playing Max, the show's resident psychic. Her character debuted in the episode "Oink! Oink!".

=== Music career ===
In 2013, Pinto was featured on rapper Shehyee's single Trip Lang.

=== ABS-CBN ===
Dubbed the "IT-girl of the moment", Pinto graced the covers of magazines such as Woman Today, Gadgets Magazine, and FHM Philippines (July 2010).

She portrayed Amanda, a mangkukulam (witch) and love interest of Jake Cuenca's character, in the ABS-CBN primetime series Agimat Presents: Elias Paniki. She also starred in the 2010 film Petrang Kabayo, a remake of the 1980s comedy, alongside Vice Ganda.

=== GMA Network ===
After speculation about her network transfer, Pinto confirmed her move to GMA Network via Twitter on July 27, 2011, writing: "Thank you KAPUSO family for welcoming me! I'm so excited. So finally I can answer, yes I'm a KAPUSO now :)." She signed a three-year exclusive contract and starred in the network's 2010 Metro Manila Film Festival entry Si Agimat at si Enteng Kabisote, playing Samara, a warrior princess and love interest of Senator Bong Revilla's character.

=== FHM ===
Pinto was voted FHM Philippines' Sexiest Woman in the World in 2011 and 2012. She placed second in 2013 and 2014, losing to Marian Rivera and later competing against Ellen Adarna and Andrea Torres. In 2015, she dropped to fourth place, with Jennylyn Mercado claiming the title.

== Other ventures ==
=== Business ===
Pinto opened a boutique beach resort, L'Sirene in Baler in 2017.

== Personal life ==
Pinto dated Filipino-Iranian football player Misagh Bahadoran from December 2015 until their separation in 2018. In October 2018, she announced via Instagram that she was in a relationship with professional basketball player Anthony Semerad. The couple became engaged in November 2019 during a trip to Australia and married in a civil ceremony on March 8, 2021. On May 5, 2021, Pinto revealed on Instagram that they were expecting their first child. Five days later, they confirmed they were having a baby girl.

== Filmography ==
=== Television / Digital Series ===
Year	Title	Role
2009	Midnight DJ	Max
2009–2010	ASAP	Herself / Performer
2009–2010	Pinoy Big Brother: Double Up	Herself / Contestant
2010	Your Song: Isla	Sam
2010	Agimat: Ang Mga Alamat ni Ramon Revilla: Elias Paniki	Amanda
2010	Ilumina	Elizaria
2010–2013	Party Pilipinas	Herself
2013–2015	Sunday All Stars	Herself / Performer
2010–2016	Bubble Gang	Herself
2010–2011	Puso ng Pasko: Artista Challenge	Herself
2010	Jillian: Namamasko Po	Lisa
2011	Spooky Nights: The Ringtone	Tricia / Sad-Ako
2011	Captain Barbell Ang Pagbabalik	Sammy / ShapeShifter
2011	Spooky Nights: Panata	Agnes
2012	Legacy	Ciara Estuar
2012	Spooky Nights Presents: Kasambahay	Shirley
2013	Indio	Lidagat
2013	With a Smile	Maricar
2014	Vampire ang Daddy Ko	Maria
2015	My Mother's Secret	Lucy Arevalo
2015–2016	Princess in the Palace	Vanessa Soriano
2016	Ang Panday	Steph
2016	Wattpad Present: Fashion Blogger	Daniella
2017	FPJ's Ang Probinsyano	Isabel
2017	La Luna Sangre	Diana
2018	Tunay Na Buhay	Herself / Guest
2020	Eat Bulaga!	Herself / Guest
2020	Bubble Gang	Herself / Guest (last television appearance before hiatus)
2023–2024	Abot-Kamay na Pangarap	Dra. Denise Evangelista-Lobrin
2025	Sanggang-Dikit FR	Dra. Cecilia Montero

=== Film ===
Year	Title	Role
2010	Petrang Kabayo	Samantha
2010	Si Agimat at Si Enteng Kabisote	Samara
2011	Catch Me, I'm in Love	Nicole Morales
2011	Tween Academy: Class of 2012	Maggie
2012	Hitman	Gina
2012	Boy Pick-Up: The Movie	Neneng B.
2012	Si Agimat, Si Enteng and Me	Samara
2014	Muslim Magnum .357: To Serve and Protect	Princess Ameerah
2015	Maria Labo	Emily
2018	Ang Pambansang Third Wheel	Monica
TBA	Petrang Kabayo: Ang Lihim ng Bughaw na Anting-anting †	Samantha
TBA	Petrang Kabisote †	Samantha

== Awards and nominations ==
Year	Critics	Award	Result
2010	FHM Philippines	Philippine Sexiest Finest	Rank # 32
2011	FHM Philippines	Philippine Sexiest Finest	Rank # 1
2012	FHM Philippines	Philippine Sexiest Finest	Rank # 1
2012	2nd Yahoo! OMG Awards	Celebrity of the Year	Nominated
2013	FHM Philippines	Philippine Sexiest Finest	Rank # 2
2014	FHM Philippines	Philippine Sexiest Finest	Rank # 2
2015	FHM Philippines	Philippine Sexiest Finest	Rank # 4

Preceded by Angel Locsin	FHM Philippines; Sexiest Woman of the Year (2011, 2012)	Succeeded by Marian Rivera
