= Ron Henley (rapper) =

Filipino rapper and songwriter

- Born: Ron Joseph Henley; May 20, 1986 (age 40); Pasig, Philippines
- Genres: Pinoy hip hop
- Occupations: Rapper, Songwriter
- Instrument: Vocals
- Years active: 2001–present
- Labels: Artifice Records; MCA Music Inc.; Viva Records
- Website: Ron Henley on X Ron Henley on Instagram

Ron Joseph Henley (born May 20, 1986) is a Filipino rapper, singer & songwriter best known for his tracks "Biglang Liko" and "Hagdan". As of 2022, Henley has garnered almost two hundred million streams on YouTube. Henley is considered one of the pioneers of the mainstream rap movement in the Philippines, mentored by Francis M, he joined the group "Stick Figgas" alongside Loonie. He went on to become one of the most accomplished hip-hop artists in the Philippines with his "unique melodic-lyrical style and great songwriting ability".

== Personal life and career ==
Henley started rapping at age 14. He later went into rehab. After he was released from there, he met Francis Magalona together with Loonie after a TV rap competition entitled Rap-Public of the Philippines on Eat Bulaga!, where they were recognized as Stick Figgas. Magalona led the way for him by including Henley's soundtrack in a collaboration album. Henley's biggest break was the song that he wrote entitled "Biglang Liko". He released his debut EP entitled "Wala Pang Titulo" on April 8, 2013.
