= 2004 in Nordic music =

The following is a list of notable events and releases that happened in Nordic music in 2004.

== Events ==
- 1 January – Norwegian singer Kurt Nilsen wins the international competition World Idol, against opposition from Arab, Australian, Belgian, Canadian, Dutch, German, Polish, South African, UK and US competitors.
- 9 January – Hanna Pakarinen wins the first series of the Finnish singing competition Idols.
- 2 April – Magne Thormodsæter is awarded the Vossajazzprisen 2004 on the first day of the Vossajazz festival.
- 10 May – Peter Tägtgren replaces Mikael Åkerfeldt on lead vocals in the Swedish band Bloodbath.
- 15 May – At the final of the 39th Eurovision Song Contest in Istanbul, the highest-placed of the Scandinavian countries is Sweden, represented by Lena Philipsson, who finishes fifth. Iceland and Norway finish 19th and 24th respectively. Denmark and Finland are both eliminated at the semi-final stage.
- 10 June – A gala concert is given by the Danish National Symphony Orchestra in Copenhagen's Tivoli Concert Hall, to celebrate the 70th birthday of Henrik, Prince Consort of Denmark. It includes the première performance of Frederik Magle's symphonic poem Souffle le vent from the Cantabile suite.
- 26 November – Daniel Lindström from Umeå wins the first series of the Swedish version of Pop Idol on TV4.
- 11 December – The Nobel Peace Prize Concert is held at the Oslo Spektrum in Norway. Stars include Cyndi Lauper, Sondre Lerche, Baaba Maal and Andrea Bocelli.

== Classical works ==
- Einojuhani Rautavaara
  - Book of Visions for orchestra
  - Manhattan Trilogy for strings
- Esa-Pekka Salonen
  - Stockholm Diary
  - Wing on Wing

== Musical films ==
- Alt for Egil, starring Kristoffer Joner

== Popular music ==
- Björk – "Who Is It" (#5 Spain, #26 UK)
- Shirley Clamp – "Eviga längtan" (#3 Swedish radio chart)
- Trine Dyrholm – "Avenuen" (from "Mr. Nice Guy" (EP; #1 Denmark)
- Fame – "Vindarna vänder oss" (#10 Swedish radio chart)
- Gyllene Tider – "Jag borde förstås vetat bättre" (#7 Swedish radio chart)
- Daniel Lindström – "Coming True" (#1 Sweden)
- Markoolio – "In med bollen" (Sweden #1)
- Nightwish – "Nemo" (#1 Finland, #1 Hungary)
- Lena Philipsson – "It Hurts" (#1 Sweden, #6 Turkey)
- Sonata Arctica – "Don't Say a Word" (#1 Finland)
- Tarja Turunen – "Yhden enkelin unelma" (#1 Finland)

== Eurovision Song Contest ==
- Denmark in the Eurovision Song Contest 2004
- Finland in the Eurovision Song Contest 2004
- Iceland in the Eurovision Song Contest 2004
- Norway in the Eurovision Song Contest 2004
- Sweden in the Eurovision Song Contest 2004

== Deaths ==
- 14 January – Terje Bakken, Norwegian heavy metal vocalist (born 1978; hypothermia)
- 6 February – Jørgen Jersild, Danish composer and music educator (born 1913)
- 20 February – Ørnulf Gulbransen, Norwegian flautist (born 1916)
- 20 March – Bernhard Christensen, Danish organist and composer (born 1916)
- 13 May – Kjell Bækkelund, Norwegian classical pianist (born 1930)
- 9 June – Bent Jædig, Danish jazz saxophonist and flautist (born 1935)
- 12 November – Usko Meriläinen, Finnish composer (born 1930)
- 26 December (killed in Thailand by the 2004 Indian Ocean earthquake and tsunami)
  - Sigurd Køhn, Norwegian jazz saxophonist and composer (born 1959)
  - Markus Sandlund, Swedish cellist (born 1975)
