= Private Corner =

Studio album by Jacky Cheung
- Released: 29 January 2010
- Studio: IOI limited Studio (Hong Kong)
- Genres: Jazz; Canto-jazz
- Length: 40:35
- Label: Universal Music
- Producer: Andrew Tuason

Jacky Cheung chronology
By your side (2007)	Private Corner (2010)	Wake Up Dreaming (2014)

Private Corner is a studio album by Hong Kong singer Jacky Cheung, known as God of Songs and one of the Four Heavenly Kings. It is the first jazz album of Cantopop, a concept album recorded in the style of "Canto-jazz", coined by Cheung to describe the new musical sound of the songs. There are nine Cantonese-language songs and one English track. Chinese music critics expected that this album would make jazz a popular genre in Greater China.

Private Corner was released on 29 January 2010 by What's Music, a subsidiary of Universal Music.The album went platinum in less than a week. Private Corner was released on Mainland China 4 February 2010. Original songs were written by international writers from the U.S., Germany, Sweden, Norway and Australia expressly for Cheung's project. In Hong Kong, the songs were adapted into Cantonese language. Featured international guest artists included The Sylvia St. James Choir and Tollak Ollestad.

The album was recorded for audiophile quality sound, with vocal recording in Hong Kong, sound-mixing and mastering in the US and disc manufacturing in Germany. It was also released as a special vinyl edition. During the Private Corner sessions, Cheung was filming his lead role in the Hong Kong film Crossing Hennessy, produced by William Kong. "Bu Zhi You Yuan (Lucky In Love)", written for Cheung, appears as the theme song of Crossing Hennessy.

== Concept ==
Cheng describes his album as an invitation to his listeners into his "private world":

"Nowadays, people are always so busy and caught up in work that they need to retreat into their own 'Private Corner' to escape and let go of all their stress and frustrations."

== Overview ==
After over 25 years' experience as a pop artist, releasing over 70 albums of songs that were karaoke hits, Jacky Cheung, a lover of jazz music, decided to make an album of his own personal taste, a jazz record. He wanted the freedom to sing songs he likes and share his own perspective and personal emotions, without being concerned with commercial pressures.

At the Private Corner press conference Cheung explained "I would come across jazz songs occasionally in the past, but I would consider whether this song will be popular at karaoke bars. I would always fear, 'This won't work,' and put more karaoke songs on an album." With digital music and piracy causing a decline in record sales, he continued, "Now the situation is different. Even if you factor in commercial considerations, it won't make a difference...So I could be very happy, very carefree in producing this album." Cheung personally funded the costs of recording Private Corner, wishing to avoid any label restrictions, saying "It's up to me, they just help me implement it". He added that money was not a consideration and if it were a loss, he'd make up for it in the future.

Private Corner was Cheung's first Cantonese album release in 6 years and in keeping with the album's title, Cheung kept quiet about it, without the customary pre-orders and album promotion. Cheung recorded the album in Cantonese, explaining his personal connection to the Cantonese dialect: "I started out performing Cantonese songs, so for me, the importance of Cantonese albums is still great." Cheung stated that "The new album "Private Corner" is my favorite album". In the past I was concerned about my records being commercial enough for the market, but with this album, I did not consider it very much.

== Songs ==
Cheung conducted an international search in pursuit of suitable songs for his new album project. By June 2009, he had recorded an entire disc. Upon listening to the repertoire, he decided that six of the songs no longer fit the concept he envisioned for the album. Cheung spent the next 6 months seeking out and recording new songs. The concept of the album is jazz but each song is different in style, arrangement and content to express Cheung's temperaments in every way, musically and lyrically. Every song selected for the album is a genre that Cheung personally enjoys listening to but had few opportunities to sing on his past albums.

The album opens with "Mi Ni", a cover of the Bobby Caldwell song "Stuck On You" and the song that determined the direction of the album. Cheung explained after listening to a variety of jazz recordings for two years, when he heard Bobby Caldwell's music, he knew he'd found what he was looking for and wanted to sing it. Lyrically, the song is love infatuation. American songwriter Roxanne Seeman wrote five of the songs, collaborating with Kine Ludvigsen and Olav Fossheim in Sweden, Philipp Steinke in Germany, Daniel Lindstrom and Daniele Musto in Stockholm, and Daniel Nitt in Germany. Four of these songs were adapted into Cantonese by the Hong Kong lyricist Kenny So (Qiao Xing 乔星).

"Double Trouble" features an uptempo big band swing arrangement accentuating the tension in the lyrics Cheung sings about being caught in a dangerous situation, while in "Not Only Fate", a mid-tempo ballad with a string quartet and a piano playing a softly rhythmic accompaniment of semitone triplets, Cheung sings of an obsession for passion living in the loneliness of a big city. In "Let It Go", Cheung sings with the backing of a gospel chorus, namely the Sylvia St. James choir, of letting go of lost love, and a saxophone solo.

"Zhǎo Duì Nǐ 找對你 (Finding The Right You or Looking for you) (Which Way, Robert Frost?)" is a waltz featuring a harmonica solo by Tollak Ollestad, while "Earl Grey Tea", written by Pete Moore, an Australian living in Hong Kong, is a lament of the pressures of survival. "Moonba Girl" is written and performed by Hong Kong writers and musicians, and while Cheung recorded it to memorialize his friend Lydia Sum, the arrangement has an uptempo Broadway-style arrangement with lyrics rejoicing in her laughter and their closeness. "Everyday Is Christmas" is the only song Cheung sings in English. After repeated attempts by Chinese authors to write a Cantonese adaptation for it, Cheung felt the lyrics were best expressed as they were originally written and sang it in English. The song was the tenth most downloaded Christmas song in 2010 on Nokia's Ovi.com music download service website.

== Critical reception ==
Private Corner was the group favorite of the Chinese Music Media Awards. The jury was composed of media professionals, musicians, and critics from across the strait. Anke of 21cn.com wrote: " the God of Songs expresses...subtleties in his emotions through the joyful and bitter experiences in his life and does it naturally. Intoxicatingly, this is the musical wisdom that belongs to a mature man."

== Promotion ==
Jacky Cheung Mini Concert was held at the Polytechnic University Hong Kong Jockey Club Auditorium. Cheung performed songs from his Private Corner album as well as several standards. Cheung chose the Hong Kong Jockey Club, a smaller hall than his usual arena shows, because he wanted the atmosphere to feel the vibe of a jazz club. "I want to play jazz, it's fun!" Cheung said.

== Private Corner press conference ==
Jacky Cheung and Universal Music held a press conference for the release of Jacky Cheung's Private Corner album at the Shangri-la Hotel on 28 January 2010. Universal Music paid HKD 3 million for the press conference. Over 100 reporters from Hong Kong and Asia media outlets attended. Top management Yip Jia Bao, ATV, Wu Rong Xing, i-Cable, and Virginia Lok, TVB attended. In the midst of a heated royalty dispute between the Hong Kong broadcaster TVB and the four major record labels and long-standing restrictions on singers from appearing on rival TV stations, Jacky Cheung accepted ATV's invitation for an interview.

In June 2009, ATV had begun complaining to the Broadcasting Authority of TVB's violation of fair competition. Among the allegations, it was said that if a Hong Kong artist was interviewed by a rival station, they could only speak Mandarin and that given that Hong Kong is a Cantonese-speaking territory, this gave TVB an advantage. 21 December 2009 the four major record labels disclosed their plan to bar their recording artists, including Jacky Cheung (Hok-yau) and Eason Chan (Yik-shun) among them, from appearing on TVB shows in an effort to settle the royalty dispute.

With Universal's support, Cheung was the first artist to appear on ATV since the dispute began. Cheung accepted the interviews with both ATV and i-Cable in Cantonese. ATV, which does not have an entertainment news department, arranged for their production crew and news reporters to attend the Private Corner Press Conference, with their coverage and Cheung's interview airing on their station's nightly news program. Cheung remarked that he was very excited to be doing his first interview with a regular news crew in Hong Kong. It was his second appearance on ATV in 19 years. During the interview, Cheung encouraged all media outlets to expose more people to Cantonese music. He also spoke of future appearances on i-Cable and ATV to promote his Private Corner album.

Regarding how the dispute is affecting his relationship with TVB, Cheung remarked: "If they ask me to do a film for them, I will definitely do it. In terms of singing, it will have to wait until after the royalty dispute is over. Of course, I also hope that TVB would be able to air MVs because at the end of the day, music is music." Cheung performed "Love Scale" by Roger Wang, live for the first time at the press conference.

== Track listing ==
No.	Title	Writer(s)	Cantonese lyricist	Length
1.	"Mi Ni (Stuck on You)" (迷你)	Bobby Caldwell, Henry Marx	Chan Siu Kei	4:00
2.	"Double Trouble"	Roxanne Seeman, Kine Ludvigsen, Olav Fossheim	Kenny So (Qiao Xing 乔星)	3:13
3.	"Bu Zhi You Yuan (Lucky in Love)" (不只有緣)	Seeman, Daniel Nitt	Kenny So (Qiao Xing 乔星)	4:40
4.	"Love Scale" (十二個音)	Roger Wang	Kenny So (Qiao Xing 乔星)	4:53
5.	"Lydia"	Leon Ko	Chan Siu Kei	3:32
6.	"Watch Her Walk" (戀上你背面)	Peter D. Moore, Holger Skepeneit	Chan Siu Kei	3:46
7.	"Let It Go"	Seeman, Daniel Lindstrom, Daniele Musto	Kenny So (Qiao Xing 乔星)	4:10
8.	"Zhao Dui Ni (Which Way, Robert Frost?)" (找對你)	Seeman, Philipp Steinke	Kenny So (Qiao Xing 乔星)	3:52
9.	"Bellagio" (伯爵茶)	Moore, Skepeneit, Riley Lam	Ruo Ning Lin	4:17
10.	"Everyday Is Christmas"	Seeman, Steinke		4:02

=== Live Blu-ray ===
No.	Title	Writer(s)	Cantonese lyricist	Length
1.	"Shi Er Ge Yin (Live)"	Roger Wang	Chan Siu Kei	5:08
2.	"Mi Ni (Live)"	Bobby Caldwell, Henry Marx	Chan Siu Kei	4:03
3.	"Lian Shang Ni Bei Mian (Live)"	Peter D. Moore Holger Skepeneit	Chan Siu Kei	3:49
4.	"Zhao Dui Ni (Live)"	Roxanne Seeman Philipp Steinke	Kenny So (Qiao Xing 乔星)	3:46
5.	"Everyday is Christmas (Live)"	Seeman, Steinke		4:55
6.	"Medley: Pink Panther / New York New York (Live)"	Henry Mancini; Fred Ebb, John Kander		3:49
7.	"Somewhere Over The Rainbow (Live)"	Harold Arlen, E.Y. Harburg		3:42
8.	"Medley: Fo Tiao Qiang / Wo Yao (Live)"	Elvis Presley; Otis Blackwell	Xu Guanjie, Peter Li	4:32
9.	"Qing Ren De Yan Lei (Live)"	Chen Shaoqi, Gao Shizhang		6:09
10.	"Fei Jie (Live)"	Anthony Chue, Leon Ko	Chan Siu Kei	3:38
11.	"Let It Go (Live)"	Seeman, Daniel Lindstrom, Daniele Musto	Kenny So (Qiao Xing 乔星)	4:07
12.	"Double Trouble (Live)"	Seeman, Kine Ludvigsen, Olav Fossheim		4:08
13.	"Li Xiang Lan (Live)"	Goro Matsui, Koji Tamaki	Limao Zhou	6:07
Total length:				57:53

=== Bonus MV DVD ===
No.	Title	Writer(s)	Cantonese lyricist	Length
1.	"Mi Ni MV (Live)"	Caldwell, Marx	Kenny So (Qiao Xing 乔星)
2.	"Double Trouble MV (Live)"	Seeman, Ludvigsen, Fossheim	Kenny So (Qiao Xing 乔星)
3.	"Shi Er Ge Yin MV (Live)"	Wang	Kenny So (Qiao Xing 乔星)

== Credits and personnel ==
Credits are adapted from the album's liner notes.

- Andy Peterson – bass tracks 1, 4, 5, 8, 10
- Andrew Tuason – producer, arranger tracks 1–4, 7, 8, 10, piano tracks 2, 3, 8, 10, electric piano track 7
- Lewis Pragasam – drums tracks 1, 3–5, 8, 10
- Sham Kamikaze – electric guitar track 1, guitar 8
- Steve Thornton – percussion tracks 1, 4, 8, 10
- Beijing Love Orchestra – strings tracks 1, 8
- Guillermo Fuego Jr. – acoustic guitar track 2
- Charles Huntley – horn arrangement track 2, tenor saxophone tracks 2, 5, 7, 10
- Lydia Chew – background vocals tracks 2, 3, 5
- Anna Kwan –
- Kaori Wilson – strings track 3
- Leslie Ryang – strings track 3
- Miyaka S. Wilson – strings track 3
- Simon Lau – fretless bass track 4
- Roger Wang – acoustic guitar track 4
- Miguel Inot – alto saxophone tracks 5, 7, 10
- Anthony Chue – horn arrangement track 5
- Sylvain Gagnon – bass tracks 5, 7
- Anthony Fernandez – drums tracks 5, 7
- Ben Pelletier – trombone tracks 2, 5, 10
- John Campo – trumpet tracks 2, 5, 10
- Paul Panichi – trumpet tracks 5, 7, 10
- Holger Skepeneit – arranger tracks 6, 9, piano tracks 6, 9
- Peter D. Moore – arranger tracks 6, 9
- Tom Mason – bass tracks 6, 9
- George Hart – drums tracks 6, 9
- Stelios Kalasperedies – guitar tracks 6, 9
- Vasilis Xenopoulos – tenor saxophone track 6
- The Sylvia St. James Choir – choir track 7
- Danny Leung – guitar track 7
- Ted Lo – string arrangement track 8
- Tollak Ollestad – harmonica track 8
- Michael Stever – horn arrangement track 10
- Jamie Wilson – guitar track 8

=== Private Corner Mini Concert personnel ===
- Jacky Cheung – artistic director
- Miguel Inot – alto saxophone
- Sylvain Gagnon – bass
- Lydia Chew – background vocals
- Paul Wah – background vocals
- Duck Lau – background vocals
- Lewis Pragasam – drums
- Sham Kamikaze – guitar
- Allan Lau – keyboards
- Stephen Lim – mixing engineer
- Chris Polanco – percussion
- Andrew Tuason 杜自持 (Du Zizhi) – producer, music director, piano
- Carlos Chan – recording engineer
- Clement Pong – recording engineer
- Lam Wing Cheung – recording engineer
- Kong Kwok Wah – recording engineer
- Daniel Kwan – sound designer
- Charles Huntley – tenor saxophone
- Ben Pelletier – trombone
- Paul Pinichi – Trumpet

== Charts ==
Chart (2010)	Peak position
Hong Kong Albums (HKRMA)	1
