= Little Numbers =

Single by BOY

from the album Mutual Friends
- Released: August 26, 2011
- Genre: Pop; indie pop
- Length: 3:39
- Label: Grönland
- Songwriters: Sonja Glass; Valeska Steiner
- Producer: Philipp Steinke

BOY singles chronology
| "Little Numbers" (2011) | "Oh Boy" (2012) |

"Little Numbers" is a song by Swiss-German pop duo BOY. It was written by band members Valeska Steiner and Sonja Glass for their debut studio album Mutual Friends (2011), while production was helmed by Philipp Steinke. The song was released as the band's debut single in August 2011. A folkish indie pop song, the uptempo track is built almost entirely on drums and piano. Lyrically, "Little Numbers" depicts its protagonist waiting for a call from their love interest, while killing time by daydreaming.

The song gained significant popularity in German-speaking Europe after being featured in German airline Lufthansa's Business Class commercial in mid-2012. It also served as the theme song for the German comedy film No Sex Is No Option (2011) as well as the television comedy series Knallerfrauen, and was also featured in the American film How to Be Single (2016). While "Little Numbers" became a moderate commercial success in Europe, it reached number 4 on the Japan Hot 100 chart.

== Track listing ==
Digital single
| No. | Title | Length |
|---|---|---|
| 1. | "Little Numbers" | 3:39 |
| 2. | "Skin" (Acoustic Version) | 3:23 |

== Charts ==
=== Weekly charts ===
| Chart (2011–13) | Peak position |
|---|---|
| Belgium (Ultratip Bubbling Under Flanders) | 41 |
| France (SNEP) | 139 |
| Germany (GfK) | 65 |
| Japan (Japan Hot 100) (Billboard) | 4 |
| Switzerland (Schweizer Hitparade) | 56 |
| US Adult Alternative Airplay (Billboard) | 17 |
