= Kenny So =

Chinese poet (born 1976)

- 喬星
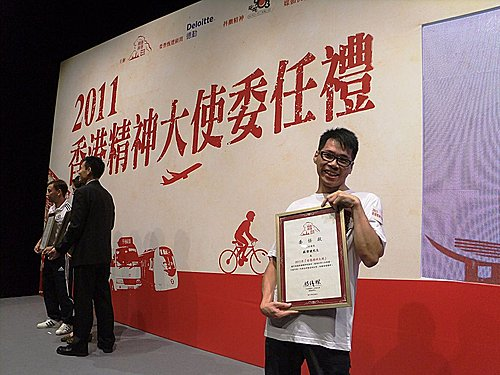
- Born: 6 August 1976 (age 50); British Hong Kong
- Education: The Chinese University of Hong Kong; The Hong Kong Polytechnic University
- Occupations: Lyricist; Songwriter; Poet; Social Worker

Kenny So Wai-kin (traditional Chinese: 蘇偉健; simplified Chinese: 苏伟健; pinyin: Sū Wěijiàn), also known as Kiu Sing and Qiao Xing (simplified Chinese: 乔星; traditional Chinese: 喬星; pinyin: Qiáo Xīng), is a Chinese lyricist and poet best known for his songs by Nicholas Tse, Sandy Lam, and Jacky Cheung. His movie theme songs received nominations at the 33rd Hong Kong Film Awards in 2014, and the 40th Hong Kong Film Awards in 2022. His entry 一個人的浪漫 was selected as "most popular song online" (網上最受歡迎歌曲) in the 18th CASH Pop Composition Competition, and his entry Pink Eye Syndrome won the third place in the 19th CASH Pop Composition Competition.

== Origin of pen name ==
In an interview, So said that the words "Kiu" (喬) and "Sing" (星) were taken from the names of his two former lovers as a memorial.

== Early life and education ==
So was born with cerebral palsy. Having cerebral palsy impacted his control of the muscles of the whole body. During his school days, it was very difficult for So to hold a pen. Every time he did homework, he would sweat profusely and struggle with it. Despite his disability, So chose to enroll in mainstream schools and pursue conventional education. He started to write lyrics in middle school, published his adapted lyrics works online in college. His high scores gained him entrance to The Chinese University of Hong Kong, where he pursued studies in the Department of Chinese Language and Literature. So also graduated from the Department of Applied Social Sciences of The Hong Kong Polytechnic University as a registered social worker.

== Career ==
In 2005, "Bitter Lover", So's first work as a lyricist, was published. In 2007, So and Hong Kong composer Hou Guangwu participated in the CASH Pop Composition Competition, and their entry "Pink Eye Syndrome" won third place.

Since 2005, So has written song lyrics for Nicholas Tse, Jacky Cheung, Vangie Tang, Jason Chan, Elanne Kong, Ella Koon, Deep Ng, Ruco Chan, Elle Choi, Ivan Wang,Theresa Fu, Jun Kung, Eric Suen Yiu Wai, Angela Au, Sammi Chan, Terence wan, Sandy Lam and James Ng.

== Work with Jacky Cheung ==
In 2010, So wrote four Cantonese lyric adaptations for Jacky Cheung 's Canto-jazz album "Private Corner": "Double Trouble", "Bu Zhi You Yuan (Lucky in Love)" (不只有缘), "Let It Go", and "Zhao Dui Ni (Which Way, Robert Frost?)" (找对你). Double Trouble was a featured production number in Jacky Cheung's 1/2 Century Tour. "Bu Zhi You Yuan" by Jacky Cheung was the theme song of the Hong Kong film Crossing Hennessy.

== Awards ==
- Nomination, 33rd Hong Kong Film Awards in 2014 for "Best Original Movie Song", theme song for the movie As the Light Goes Out: Love is the Greatest.
- Nomination, 40th Hong Kong Film Awards in 2022 for "Best Original Movie Song", theme song for the movie Raging Fire: Confrontation.
- 一個人的浪漫, selected as "most popular song online" (網上最受歡迎歌曲) in the 18th CASH Pop Composition Competition.
- Pink Eye Syndrome won the third place in the 19th CASH Pop Composition Competition.
- Selected as a "Top Ten Regeneration Warrior" (十大再生勇士) by Regeneration Society.
