= Which Way, Robert Frost? =

Song by Jacky Cheung

from the album Private Corner
- Language: Cantonese
- Released: January 29, 2010
- Genre: Jazz; Canto-jazz
- Label: Universal Music
- Songwriter(s): Roxanne Seeman; Philipp Steinke; Kenny So (Qiao Xing)
- Producer(s): Andrew Tuason (杜自持)

Music video
- "Zhǎo Duì Nǐ 找對你 (Which Way, Robert Frost)" on YouTube

"Which Way, Robert Frost" (Chinese: 找對你) is a song by Jacky Cheung, written by Roxanne Seeman and Philipp Steinke for Cheung's Private Corner album. The title and lyrics refer to the narrative poem "The Road Not Taken" written by the American poet Robert Frost. The lyrics were adapted into Cantonese by Kenny So (乔星 Qiao Xing). It was released on January 29, 2010, by Universal Music.

Jacky Cheung performed "Zhǎo Duì Nǐ 找對你 (Looking for you)" at his Private Corner Mini Concert at the Hong Kong Jockey Club on April 30. Cheung's Private Corner Mini Concert DVD was released on July 23, 2010.

== Composition and lyrical inspiration ==
The title and theme makes reference to the Robert Frost poem "The Road Not Taken". The inspiration for the writing of the lyrics came from the sentiments that Seeman felt, after attending a screening of the Disney/Pixar animated movie "Up". Roxanne Seeman provided an explanation of the concept and writing of the lyrics for the song to be adapted into Cantonese language. Kenny So was the author chosen to write the Cantonese adaptation.

The song is a waltz.

== Style ==
Zhǎo Duì Nǐ 找對你 (Looking for you) is a song in the style of “Canto-jazz”, a genre coined by Jacky Cheung for the style of songs on Private Corner, his first jazz album.

== Recording and production ==
Zhǎo Duì Nǐ 找對你 (Looking for you) by Jacky Cheung was produced by Andrew Tuason (杜自持). The rhythm section was recorded in Malaysia. Tollak Ollestad is featured on harmonica. His harmonica part was recorded in the Netherlands. Cheung's vocals were recorded in Hong Kong.

== Critical reception ==
Tencent described the swaying sketch with harmonica as the main accompaniment, writing "the many semitones in the tune, show a unique sentiment in Jacky Cheung’s interpretation."

Tencent rated Finding the Right You (Zhǎo Duì Nǐ 找對你 (Looking for you)) as best composition on the Private Corner album explaining that Jacky Cheung is called "God of Songs" because he can sing a slow ballad "straight into people's hearts". The song was described as being the one that "most easily reaches into people's hearts intoxicatingly touching their souls. In the case of excellent lyrics, music, arrangement, and production, the composition is even more outstanding because this song can capture the key to the human heart."

== Live performances and usage in other media ==
Cheung performed "Looking for you (Which Way, Robert Frost)" at his Private Corner Mini Concert held at the Polytechnic University Hong Kong Jockey Club on April 30. The show was taped, with the Private Corner Mini Concert DVD releasing July 23, 2010.

== Credits and personnel ==
Credits are adapted from the album's liner notes.

- Jacky Cheung – lead vocals
- Andrew Tuason (杜自持) – arranger, piano, conductor
- Ted Lo – arranger, strings
- Lewis Pragasam – drums
- Andy Peterson – electric bass
- Tollak Ollestad – featuring, harmonica
- Sham Kamikaze – guitar
- Kenny So (乔星 Qiao Xing) – Cantonese lyrics
- Roxanne Seeman – songwriter
- Philipp Steinke – songwriter
- Steve Thornton – percussion
- Beijing Love Orchestra – strings

== Paolo Onesa version ==
"Which Way, Robert Frost?"
Sample from Which Way, Robert Frost?

"Which Way, Robert Frost?" was recorded by Paolo Onesa in English on his Pop Goes Standards album, released on Valentine’s Day, February 17, 2014, by MCA Music, Philippines. It was produced by Francis Guevarra.

The track is included in The Crossover Cafe II compilation album released by Universal Music, alongside songs by Norah Jones, Maroon 5, Marvin Gaye, Stevie Wonder and others.

In BusinessWorld Online, Jeffrey O. Valisno described the song as having "“romantic” written all over it" saying "Mr. Onesa sings like a guy smitten with a lovely girl while paying a tribute to the American poet of “The Road Not Taken.”

== Awards ==
"Which Way, Robert Frost?" received multiple Awit Award nominations at the 28th Awit Awards:

- Best Performance By A Male Recording Artist, Paolo Onesa
- Best Musical Arrangement, Benjie Pating
- Best Vocal Arrangement, Arnie Mendaros
- Best Engineered Recording, Ferdie Marquez & Efren San Pedro, Freq Studio & 12 Stone Studio
