= Christmas with My Friends =

Christmas album series by Nils Landgren

Christmas with My Friends is a series of Christmas albums by Swedish trombonist Nils Landgren, known as Man with the Red Horn, released on ACT Music beginning in 2006. The recordings feature various guest musicians and include interpretations of Christmas music from a range of traditions and styles, including jazz, folk, classical, and popular music.

== Background ==
The concept began as a collaborative studio recording centered around seasonal music, with contributions from vocalists and instrumentalists associated with Landgren. Subsequent releases continued the format with varying personnel and repertoire.

The first album sold 10,000 copies and was thus certified gold. The third became the best-selling jazz album of the year in Germany in just over a month. The first and second albums both received positive reviews in The Independent.

== Track listing ==
Volume I: Christmas with My Friends (2006)
No.	Title	Length
1.	"Maybe This Christmas"	2:50
2.	"Ave Maris Stella"	3:39
3.	"Bereden Väg För Herran"	2:06
4.	"Jul Jul Strålande Jul"	2:02
5.	"When You Wish Upon A Star"	4:51
6.	"Christmas Song"	4:51
7.	"Lascia Ch'io Pianga"	3:54
8.	"Nu Tändas Tusen Juleljus"	3:01
9.	"In Dulce Jubilo/Det Kimer Nå Til Julefest"	8:42
10.	"Gläns Över Sjö Och Strand"	4:04
11.	"Det Strålar En Stjärna"	2:31
12.	"Es ist ein Ros entsprungen"	5:27
13.	"White Christmas"	3:38
14.	"What Child Is That?"	3:43
15.	"När Juldagsmorgon Glimmar"	3:09
16.	"Have Yourself A Merry Little Christmas"	4:54
17.	"Till Betlehem"	3:56
18.	"Stille Nacht, Heilige Nacht"	5:41

Volume II: Christmas with My Friends II (2008)
No.	Title	Length
1.	"A Child Is Born"	3:47
2.	"Maria Går/Törnesnår"	3:21
3.	"Ding Dong Merrily On High"	3:20
4.	"Jul Jul Strålande Jul"	4:22
5.	"Himmel"	3:19
6.	"Det Är En Ros Utsprungen"	3:17
7.	"Oh Little Town of Bethlehem"	3:47
8.	"Veni Veni Emanuel"	2:55
9.	"In Dulce Jubilo"	3:45
10.	"This Christmas"	4:40
11.	"Candlelight Carol"	4:20
12.	"Kristallen"	3:07
13.	"Christmas Hymn"	4:16
14.	"Mariä Wiegenlied"	2:28
15.	"Peace On Earth"	3:29

Volume III: Christmas with My Friends III (2011)
No.	Title	Length
1.	"Christmas is Here"	3:08
2.	"Dagen är kommen"	3:40
3.	"Ett barn är fött"	3:16
4.	"Imagine"	3:50
5.	"Someday At Christmas"	4:00
6.	"Somebody Talkin’"	2:52
7.	"Giv mig ej glans"	3:51
8.	"Ich steh´ an Deiner Krippen hier"	3:09
9.	"Away In A Manger"	2:44
10.	"Gläd dig, du Kristi brud"	3:32
11.	"River"	4:16
12.	"Nativity Carol"	4:20
13.	"Bethlehem Down"	2:43
14.	"Tochter Zion"	3:29
15.	"Infant Holy, Infant Lowly"	5:22

Volume IV: Christmas with My Friends IV (2014)
No.	Title	Length
1.	"I Wish It Was Christmas"	3:07
2.	"The First Noel"	3:56
3.	"Come Sunday"	4:13
4.	"Santa Claus Is Coming to Town"	2:24
5.	"What a Wonderful World"	4:02
6.	"Angel’s Carol"	4:00
7.	"Last Christmas"	3:25
8.	"If Anybody Ask You"	2:43
9.	"Icicles"	2:50
10.	"Maria durch ein Dornwald ging"	2:20
11.	"In the Bleak Midwinter"	3:31
12.	"Who Would Imagine a King"	4:17
13.	"Det brinner en stjärna"	3:31
14.	"O Helga Natt"	4:47
15.	"O Du saliga / O Du fröhliche"	4:30

Volume V: Christmas with My Friends V (2016)
No.	Title	Length
1.	"Morgenstern und Morgenlicht"	2:02
2.	"Let the Stars Come Out Tonight"	3:27
3.	"Joy to the World"	2:39
4.	"Baby It's Cold Outside"	2:31
5.	"Everyday Is Christmas"	3:21
6.	"Go Tell It on the Mountain"	2:51
7.	"Sleigh Ride"	3:05
8.	"O Heiland, reiß die Himmel auf"	5:27
9.	"Auld Lang Syne"	3:06
10.	"Love Is Born"	3:30
11.	"Gläns över sjö och strand"	3:00
12.	"Hosianna"	3:00
13.	"Härlig Är Jorden"	2:42
14.	"Seven Stains from Christmas Eve"	3:05
15.	"There Is No Rose"	3:22
16.	"Kokles Christmas"	3:24
17.	"Now the Time Is Here"	3:46
18.	"Bereden väg för Herren"	4:07

Volume VI: Christmas with My Friends VI (2018)
No.	Title	Length
1.	"Christmas Is"	2:58
2.	"Oh No, It's Christmas Again"	2:34
3.	"Who Comes This Night"	3:47
4.	"Wie soll ich dich empfangen"	2:02
5.	"Little Drummer Boy / Peace On Earth"	3:16
6.	"Come One, Come All"	4:01
7.	"What Are You Doing New Year's Eve?"	3:31
8.	"The Story of Christmas"	2:57
9.	"I Have a Dream"	2:58
10.	"Merry Christmas Baby"	3:00
11.	"Christmas Lullaby"	3:58
12.	"When This Night Is Over"	3:56
13.	"I'd Like You for Christmas"	3:05
14.	"Hymn No III"	1:51
15.	"Den Signade Dag"	3:25
16.	"Hark! the Herald Angels Sing"	4:10

Volume VII: Christmas with My Friends VII (2020)
No.	Title	Length
1.	"This Christmas"	1:50
2.	"Comin' Home for Christmas"	4:27
3.	"Ave Maria"	4:12
4.	"This Endris Night"	2:49
5.	"The Forest Raised a Christmas Tree"	2:29
6.	"Gdy śliczna Panna / Listen to My Lullaby"	3:35
7.	"Sizalelwe Indodana"	3:12
8.	"Sweet Was the Song"	3:39
9.	"Hin fyrstu jól"	2:58
10.	"Hodie Christus"	3:48
11.	"Just Another Christmas Song"	3:21
12.	"Sylvian Joululaulu"	3:21
13.	"En förtvivlad vän"	4:08
14.	"Feliz Navidad"	3:23

Volume VIII: Christmas with My Friends VIII (2023)
No.	Title	Length
1.	"Blue Christmas"	3:19
2.	"That's How I Picture Christmas Eve"	2:39
3.	"Santa Baby"	2:59
4.	"Lully, Lulla, Lullay"	3:33
5.	"Most of All"	3:45
6.	"Soon After Christmas"	6:17
7.	"Bells Are Ringing"	3:32
8.	"Little Town of Bethlehem"	2:50
9.	"O Tannenbaum"	3:16
10.	"Julganglåt"	2:51
11.	"Förunderligt och nära"	3:24
12.	"In Dulce Jubilo"	5:55
13.	"It's the Most Wonderful Time of the Year"	3:06

== Personnel ==
The musicians involved in the series vary between volumes. Frequent collaborators include:

- Nils Landgren – trombone, vocals
- Ida Sand – vocals, piano
- Jeanette Köhn – vocals
- Sharon Dyall – vocals
- Jessica Pilnäs – vocals
- Johan Norberg – guitar
- Ulf Wakenius – guitar
- Jonas Knutsson – saxophone
- Eva Kruse – double bass
- Clas Lassbo – bass
