= Mutual Friends =

Mutual Friends may refer to:

- Mutual Friends (TV series), a British comedy drama television series
- Mutual Friends (film), a 2013 American comedy film
- Mutual Friends (album), a 2011 album by Boy
- Friendship
