= Everyday Is Christmas (song) =

Single by Jacky Cheung

from the album Private Corner
- Released: January 29, 2010
- Recorded: June 2009–August 2009 iMusic Workshop(Ioi) Wong Chuk Hang, Southern District, Hong Kong, Peter Mixman Studio Kuala Lumpur, Malaysia
- Genre: Jazz, Big band, Swing, Canto-jazz, Christmas
- Length: 4:55
- Label: Universal Music; Ioi Limited（production）
- Songwriters: Roxanne Seeman; Philipp Steinke
- Producer: Andrew Tuason (杜自持)

Music video
- "Everyday Is Christmas" on YouTube

"Everyday Is Christmas" is a Christmas song by Jacky Cheung (張學友), written by Roxanne Seeman and Philipp Steinke. It was issued as a single from Cheung's Private Corner album released on January 29, 2010, by Universal Music. The song was ranked by Nokia's Ovi.com download service as the tenth most downloaded Christmas song in 2010.

"Everyday Is Christmas" was recorded by Earth, Wind & Fire on their Holiday album, released October 21, 2014 by Legacy Recordings, Sony Music.

== Recording ==
Pre-production took place in Hong Kong with Andrew Tuason (杜自持) producing and coordinating with international songwriters. The rhythm section was recorded in Malaysia. Cheung's vocals were recorded in Hong Kong. The song was mixed by Gerry Brown in Los Angeles.

== Lyrics and composition ==
Roxanne Seeman and Philipp Steinke composed "Everyday Is Christmas" on guitar in Santa Monica. The demo was recorded with Philipp Steinke singing and playing keyboards at Seeman's studio and USC musicians overdubbing string bass, drums, and horns.

Everyday is Christmas was the first of seven songs written by Seeman for Cheung's "Private Corner" canto-jazz album project. Cheung tried having the lyrics for "Everyday Is Christmas" adapted into Cantonese, but liked the meaning of the lyrics in English so much that he decided to record it in English. It is the only song on the "Private Corner" album that Cheung sings in English.

== Critical reception ==
Nokia's music download service website Ovi.com announced that "Everyday is Christmas" was the tenth most downloaded Christmas song in 2010, joining classic hits such as Wham's "Last Christmas" and Mariah Carey's "All I Want for Christmas is You". Cheung is the only Chinese language singer to make it into the Top Ten.

== Live performance ==
Cheung performed "Everyday Is Christmas" at his Private Corner Mini-Concert at the Hong Kong Jockey Club on April 30, 2010. The "Private Corner" Mini-Concert DVD was released on July 23, 2010.

== Credits and personnel ==
Credits are adapted from the album's liner notes.

- Andy Peterson - bass
- Andrew Tuason (杜自持) - producer, arranger, piano
- Lewis Pragasam - drums
- Steve Thornton - percussion
- Charles Huntley - tenor saxophone
- Miguel Into - alto saxophone
- Ben Pelletier - trombone
- John Campo - trumpet
- Paul Panichi - trumpet
- Michael Stever - horn arrangement
- Gerry "The Gov" Brown - mixing engineer
- Bernie Grundman – mastering
- Jamie Wilson – guitar

== Earth, Wind & Fire version ==
Earth, Wind & Fire released "Everyday Is Christmas" as part of their Holiday album in 2014. The song was produced by Philip Bailey and Myron McKinley. The Holiday album is a perennial release by Sony Music in their Classic Christmas Album series. Savannah Evanoff for the Austin American-Statesman remarked “What a slinky, sexy Christmas love song!”

=== Personnel ===
- Philip Bailey, executive producer, producer, vocals
- Myron McKinley, keyboards, piano, producer, synthesizer
- Jerry Hey, horn arrangements
- Dave Pensado, mixing
- Tommy Vicari, engineer, horn section

== Nils Landgren version ==
Nils Landgren, Swedish R&B funk and jazz trombone player, also known as The Man With The Red Horn or Mr. Redhorn, released "Everyday Is Christmas" as part of his Christmas with My Friends V album on October 28, 2016. Following the release, Nils Landgren toured Germany for a month. The Christmas with My Friends collection achieved gold status during this time, selling 125,000 albums.

=== Personnel ===
Credits are adapted from the album's liner notes.

- Nils Landgren - trombone, vocals
- Sharon Dyall - vocals
- Jeanette Köhn - vocals
- Jessica Pilnäs - vocals
- Ida Sand - vocals, piano, school organ
- Eva Kruse - bass
- Jonas Knutsson - saxophones
- Johan Norberg - guitars, kantele
- Lasse Nilsson - recording engineer
- Janne Hansson - assistant recording engineer

Recorded at Atlantis Studios, Stockholm Additional recording - Johan Norberg at Krubaston studio Mixed and mastered by Lasse Nilsson at Nilento studios, Kållered
