= To Love in the Rest of Life =

Single by Jacky Cheung

from the album Wake Up Dreaming
- Released: October 27, 2014
- Genre: Pop music, Chinese pop music
- Length: 4:20
- Label: Universal Music Group（Distribution Enterprise）, Ioi Limited（Production Enterprise）
- Songwriter: Albert Leung / Samuel Jean / McAyla Beatley / Catherine Martin / Scott Effman / Lukas 'Nate' Nathanson
- Producer: Andrew Tuason、Jacky Cheung

"To Love in the Rest of Life" is a track released in 2014 by a Hong Kong singer Jacky Cheung who was given a nickname of "God of Songs". The track won a lot of awards as the champion. The melody was composed by Samuel Jean, McAyla Beatley, Catherine Martin, Scott Effman and Lukas 'Nate' Nathanson, the lyrics were written by Albert Leung. Andrew Tuason was the arranger of the track. It was produced by Jacky Cheung and Andrew Tuason.

== Release ==
"To Love In The Rest Of Life" was known as a Chinese single in memory of the thirtieth year of Jacky Cheung becoming a singer. Without any publicity, the distribution enterprise Universal Music Group (Taiwan) released the single in iTunes Store, AAC, YouTube, Yahoo and another three famous media channels on October 27, 2014. Shortly after it was released, it became top 1 of the singles which were downloaded. "To Love In The Rest Of Life" was composed together by five musicians from five countries, and was written by a famous songwriter Albert Leung. Different from other Chinese pop music, its style is more similar to Western pop music.

Because early in May 2014, Andrew Tuason, Jacky Cheung's musical partner, had posted on his Facebook about the record process of the new Chinese album of Jacky Cheung. After that, the public expected that this album could be released in the summer of that year. However, except for the Chinese theme song "A Carefree Childhood" for the summer cartoon "A Magical Painter" released by the Universal Music Group, there was no any news about the album. The track was probably a rare single, because in the Western Pop Music World, famous singers or bands normally release two to three songs to publicize shortly before the release of the main single.

== Introduction ==
"To Love in the Rest of Life" was inspired by a girl from Taichung, Taiwan, who was diagnosed with terminal gastric cancer. After she was diagnosed, her boyfriend did not abandon her, but took good care of her and still proposed to her eventually. Some media including EBC News reported this touching real story about a man's proposal to his 22-year-old girlfriend named Xiaoyan (The name was changed to protect the identity of the girl). At that time, Jacky Cheung was projecting his new Chinese album. He was deeply touched and inspired by the news, so he asked his friend Albert Leung, who is called "God of Lyrics", to write a song about this story. The melody was composed by five musicians of five different nationalities. But unfortunately, the heroine of the song Xiaoyan died a few days before the song was released. She was unable to listen to the song in memory of her short marriage with her husband.

The MV was shot in Yangmingshan National Park. The theme of the song was to represent life. It was directed by Shockley Huang, acted by Jacky Cheung and Karena Lam.

== Performance ==
Jacky Cheung first sang this song in the section "To Filmmakers" in public in the 51st Taipei Golden Horse in November 24, 2014, with music accompaniment by SEMIFUSA chamber orchestra. After the awards presentation, the inspiring song received critical praise by the media and fans.

== Awards ==
The 26th Golden Melody Awards
Award	Song	Result
The Best Song	To Love In The Rest Of Life	Nominated

Chinese Musicians Communication Association
Award	Song	Result
The Top 10 Songs in 2014	To Love In The Rest Of Life	Won

== See also ==
- Jacky Cheung's modern musical
