= Let It Go (Jacky Cheung song) =

Single by Jacky Cheung

from the album Private Corner
- Released: April 2010
- Genre: Jazz; Canto-jazz
- Length: 4:10
- Label: Universal Music
- Songwriter(s): Roxanne Seeman; Daniel Lindstrom; Daniele Musto; Kenny So (乔星) - Cantonese lyrics
- Producer(s): Andrew Tuason (杜自持)

Music video
- "Let It Go" on YouTube

"Let It Go" is a song by Hong Kong singer and actor Jacky Cheung (張學友) written by Roxanne Seeman, Daniel Lindstrom and Daniele Musto for Cheung's album Private Corner (2010). Cantonese lyrics were written by Kenny So (乔星). The song was released to radio by Universal Music in April 2010 as the fourth single and is the seventh track on the album.

== Composition and recording ==
"Let It Go" was written over the internet by Daniel Lindstrom and Daniele Musto in Stockholm, Sweden and Roxanne Seeman in Santa Monica, California. The lyrics for "Let It Go" were adapted into Cantonese by Hong Kong songwriter Kenny So with the chorus hook line "Let It Go" remaining in English. Thematically, the song offers words of comfort to a brokenhearted lover.

The song is produced by Andrew Tuason. The recording features a gospel choir arranged by and performed with Sylvia St. James, National Director of the House of Blues Gospel Brunch at the time of the recording.

== Personnel ==
Credits are adapted from the album's liner notes.

=== Musicians ===
- Jacky Cheung – lead vocals
- Miguel S. Inot – alto saxophone
- Andrew Tuason (杜自持) – arranger, horns, electric piano
- Sylvain Gagnon – bass
- Anthony M. Fernandes – drums
- Sylvia St. James – featuring, choir
- Danny Leung – Guitar
- Kenny So (乔星 Qiao Xing) – Cantonese lyrics
- Roxanne Seeman – songwriter
- Daniel Lindström – songwriter
- Daniele Musto – songwriter
- Charles Huntley – tenor saxophone
- Paul Panichi – trumpet

=== Production ===
- Peter Chong – recording
- Steve Barry Cohen – recording
- Stephen Lim – recording, mixing
- Gerry "The Gov" Brown – mixing
- Andrew Tuason – mixing, producer
- Bernie Grundman – mastering
- Jacky Cheung – artistic director
- Yee Chung Man – art direction
- Wing Shya – photography
- Amity Wan – graphic design
- Anthony Lee – A&R
- Kavin Tsang – A&R
- Carol Yung – post production
- Luoli (羅莉) – post production
- Duncan Wong – presenter
- Sunny Chang – presenter

== Critical reception ==
In a review of Jacky Cheung’s Private Corner album, Agi of Tencent Records Jury rated “Let It Go” with Best Composition while Lao You rated the song with Best Arrangement.

== Hong Kong music charts ==
"Let It Go" was the fourth single reached number 16 on the HMVHK sales chart (most popular Hong Kong radio chart) April 2010. Cheung's Private Corner album remained at number 1 on the HMV HK sales chart for 13 weeks.

== Live performances ==
Cheung performed "Let It Go" at his Private Corner Mini Concert at the Hong Kong Jockey Club on April 30. The "Private Corner" Mini-Concert DVD was released on July 23, 2010.

Cheung performed "Let It Go" on his Jacky Cheung 1/2 Century Tour in several cities including Kuala Lumpur, Malaysia.
