= Double Trouble (Jacky Cheung song) =

Single by Jacky Cheung

from the album Private Corner
- Released: 2010
- Genre: Jazz; Canto-jazz
- Length: 3:13
- Label: Universal Music
- Songwriters: Roxanne Seeman; Kine Ludvigsen; Olav Fossheim; Kenny So - Cantonese lyrics
- Producer: Andrew Tuason

Music video
- "Double Trouble (張學友)" on YouTube

"Double Trouble" is a song by Hong Kong singer and actor Jacky Cheung, written by Roxanne Seeman, Kine Ludvigsen-Fossheim, and Olav Fossheim with lyrics adapted into Cantonese by Hong Kong lyricist Kenny So. "Double Trouble" was issued as the first single from Cheung's Private Corner album, released by What's Music, a subsidiary label of Universal Music Group in 2010, with a companion music video premiering March 2010.

== Composition and lyrics ==
The song combines a big band swing arrangement with Cantonese lyrics. Cheung coined the phrase "canto-jazz" to describe the style.

A draft of a track with melody and hook line "Double Trouble" was sent to Roxanne Seeman in LA by her Scandinavian collaborators Olav Fossheim and Kine Ludvigsen-Fossheim. She proposed the song to Andrew Tuason, Jacky Cheung's producer in Hong Kong saying for “double trouble” the obvious would be two women but they nixed it. She came back with a finished lyric where, while minding his own business, he unwittingly is a witness to a gang hit, gets spotted by the gang and makes a run for it.

== Critical reception ==
Tencent ranked "Double Trouble" as the best single from the Private Corner album, remarking "one feels the mood of caution when facing gangsters without losing the rhythm and jumping sense of jazz" and "adds a sense of joy in "fighting gangsters and having fun".

NetEase Entertainment Editor-in-Chief Wang Xiaoyi wrote “You can smell the joyful atmosphere in Double Trouble and sense the danger on the road ahead”.

In a review of the Jacky Cheung 60+ Tour, Maureen Koh of The New Paper wrote “Double Trouble gave the consummate performer the opportunity to show off his nifty footwork，” which was further exemplified during the tour’s 2023 Macau stop when the 61-year-old singer demonstrated his physical agility by performing a perfect split on stage.

== Hong Kong music charts ==
"Double Trouble" reached number 1 on the HMVHK sales chart (most popular Hong Kong radio chart) April 2010. Cheung's Private Corner album remained at number 1 on the HMVHK sales chart for 13 weeks.

== Credits and personnel ==
- Jacky Cheung – lead vocals
- Guillermo Fuego Jr. – acoustic guitar
- Charles Huntley – alto saxophone, tenor saxophone, horns
- Andrew Tuason – arranger, bass, drum programming, piano, horns
- Lydia Chew And Group – backing vocals
- Kenny So - lyrics
- Roxanne Seeman, Olav Fossheim, Kine Ludvigsen – music
- Benjamin Pelletier - trombone
- John Campo - trumpet

== Music video ==
With sales for Jacky Cheung's Private Corner album reaching 200,000 copies in Asia alone, a celebration gathering was held by Universal Music, where Cheung debuted the music video for "Double Trouble", which he invested HKD$500,000 of his own money to make. The video was directed by Xia Yong Kang and features mainland China model Du Juan.

The "Double Trouble" video was included as a bonus extra in Jacky Cheung's Private Corner Mini Concert DVD release.

== Live performances and usage in other media ==
"Double Trouble" was a featured in all 146 shows of Jacky Cheung ½ Century Tour with a big production set, orchestra and dancers.

On January 8, 2012, for TVB’s televised 2011 Jade Solid Gold Best Ten Music Awards Presentation, the cast of Hong Kong’s celebrity artists appeared on stage one after another, opening the show with a performance of Jacky Cheung’s hit song “Double Trouble”, while the host Christine Ng Wing-mei (Wu Yongwei), elegantly danced along.

"Double Trouble" is a featured song in the Jacky Cheung 60+ Tour which opened at The Venetian Macau Cotai Arena on June 8, 2023. The song has a new production set with retro cabaret backdrop, orchestra, choreography for a 20-member dance troupe and features his own footwork.

In the New Straits Times review of the 2025 show at the Axiata Arena, Kuala Lumpur, Malaysia, the set was described as a "makeshift version of London in the Swinging 60s".
