= Philipp Steinke =

German songwriter, film composer and record producer

Philipp Steinke is a German songwriter, film composer, record producer and musician. Steinke is a member of the band Asher Lane. Philipp Steinke was born and resides in Berlin, Germany.

== Songwriting and film composing career ==
Steinke scored the soundtracks for the TV movies Im Schatten des Pferdemondes and Für immer Venedig. Steinke scored three episodes of the television series Heimatgeschichten and an episode of Stubbe – Von Fall zu Fall.

In March 2009, Steinke was staying in Los Angeles where he met and began a writing collaboration with Roxanne Seeman. Steinke and Seeman wrote "Amor En Suspenso (Crocodile Tears)" which was recorded by Alejandra Guzmán, Mexico's "Queen of Rock" for her Único album, released by EMI Latin. Guzman wrote the Spanish lyrics with Fernando Osorio. In 2010, Guzman's Único album went gold in Mexico.

Steinke and Seeman were asked to write a song for Jacky Cheung, China's #1 Pop Icon, who wanted to record a Canto-jazz concept album. Working with Cheung's producer, Andrew Tuason, Steinke and Seeman wrote "Everyday Is Christmas". Cheung asked Seeman and Steinke for another song and they wrote "Which Way, Robert Frost". According to Cheung, though he had "Everyday Is Christmas" adapted into Chinese twice, neither version captured the English lyrics as they were written so he recorded "Everyday Is Christmas" in English. Jacky Cheung's "Private Corner" is the first jazz album Cheung has recorded and went platinum in less than a week.

In November 2011, Lin Yu-chun, a Taiwanese singer, who gained fame by appearing on a Taiwanese talent show, One Million Star (超級星光大道), singing "I Will Always Love You" (written and originally sung by Dolly Parton) in the style of Whitney Houston's cover version., released "Saving Grace", co-written by Steinke with Roxanne Seeman and Finn Martin, on his Endlessly album.

"Which Way, Robert Frost?" was recorded again by Paolo Onesa on his Pop Goes Standards album, released February 17, 2014 by MCA Music, in The Philippines. "Which Way, Robert Frost?" received Awit Award nominations in 2015 in multiple categories: Paolo Onesa for Best Performance By A Male Recording Artist, Benjie Pating for Best Musical Arrangement, Arnie Mendaros for Best Vocal Arrangement, Ferdie Marquez & Efren San Pedro, Freq Studio & 12 Stone Studio for Best Engineered Recording.

In October 2014, Earth, Wind & Fire released their first Christmas album, "Holiday", including "Everyday Is Christmas" by Steinke and Seeman. In 2015, Sony released the Earth, Wind & Fire "Holiday" album with "Everyday Is Christmas", as The Classic Christmas Album, in Sony's perennial Christmas album releases.

== Producing credits ==
- Boy - Mutual Friends (2011)
- Boy - We Were Here (2015)
