= We Were Here (Boy album) =

Studio album by Boy
- Released: August 21, 2015
- Length: 34:56
- Label: Grönland
- Producer: Philipp Steinke

Boy chronology
Mutual Friends (2011)	We Were Here (2015)

We Were Here is the second studio album by Swiss-German pop duo Boy. Produced by longtime contributor Philipp Steinke, it was released on August 21, 2015 on Grönland Records. The album reached the top three on both the German and Swiss Albums Charts and entered the top five in Austria.

== Critical reception ==
Professional ratings
Review scores
Source	Rating
Laut.de	4/5 stars
Musikexpress	3/6 stars
NBHAP	4.3/5
Rolling Stone	3/5 stars

Norman Fleischer from Nothing but Hope and Passion felt that "On We Were Here Boy deliver just the right balance between familiar songwriting qualities and new musical experiments while sounding more mature, focused and confident than before." Laut.de editor Michael Schuh noted that "anyone looking for a new "Little Numbers" will be disappointed. Boy have recorded a quiet, sensual album, perhaps an intuitive response to the worldwide clamor. The great and thoughtful "We Were Here" shows Boy free of any cherished girlishness, almost serious. It's still great to dance on a warm synth carpet, but it's more likely to be tightly wrapped in the semi-darkness than in the bright sun on a flower meadow. When fanfares herald the song's finale towards the end, Boy reaches their very own Pet Shop Boys moment." André Boße, writing for Musikexpress, summed the album as "harmless music, simple images – and yet not wrong: Boy's mainstream pop is absolutely fine."

Rolling Stone critic Frank Lähnemann found that "the fact that the two women [...] were noticeably struggling with a follow-up to their monster debut Mutual Friends is always evident [on We Were Here] – especially since the album's playing time is limited to 35 minutes. Boy keep slowing themselves down, stopping when they could take off. An advertising agency working for airlines is unlikely to be found at the moment." Süddeutsche Zeitung editor Thierry Backes wrote that songs like "We Were Here", "Hit My Heart" or "New York" easily "find their way into the ear and stay in the memory. And that's what Boy is all about: catchy melodies, harmoniously arranged. In this regard, Glass and Steiner do academically precise work. The nine new pieces appear more opulent than the previous ones; Glass and Steiner rely on more reverb and less acoustics." He further added: "A moderate further development from the 2011 debut can certainly be identified, but one with the clear aim of not alienating fans. Which definitely succeeds."

== Track listing ==
All song were written by BOY and produced by Philipp Steinke.

We Were Here – Standard edition
No.	Title	Length
1.	"We Were Here"	4:19
2.	"Fear"	3:06
3.	"Hit My Heart"	3:46
4.	"Hotel"	4:18
5.	"No Sleep for the Dreamer"	4:42
6.	"Flames"	3:51
7.	"New York"	3:09
8.	"Rivers or Oceans"	4:15
9.	"Into the Wild"	3:26
10.	"Into the Wild" (Acoustic Version)	3:57
11.	"Hit My Heart" (Acoustic Version)	3:44
12.	"Flames" (Acoustic Version)	3:36
13.	"Hotel" (Acoustic Version)	3:59
14.	"Rivers or Oceans" (Lambert Rework)	2:55

== Charts ==
Chart performance for We Were Here
Chart (2015)	Peak position
Austrian Albums (Ö3 Austria)	5
Belgian Albums (Ultratop Flanders)	166
German Albums (Offizielle Top 100)	3
Swiss Albums (Schweizer Hitparade)	3

== Release history ==
We Were Here release history
Region	Date	Format	Label
Various	August 21, 2015	CD; digital download; streaming; vinyl	Grönland
