= Bereden väg för Herran =

Christian hymn with lyrics by Frans Michael Franzén

- Hymn
- English: Prepare the way for the Lord
- Occasion: Advent
- Written: 1812
- Text: by Frans Michael Franzén
- Language: Swedish

"Bereden väg för Herran" ("Prepare the Way for the Lord") is a Christian hymn with lyrics by Frans Michael Franzén in 1812. Britt G. Hallqvist later rewrote the lyrics of the last verse. Describing Jesus coming into Jerusalem, is a popular Advent song.

== Publications ==
- Riddarholmskyrkans handskrivna koralbok 1694.
- Ovikens kyrkas handskrivna koralbok late 18th century
- 1819 års psalmbok as number 53 under the lines "Jesu kärleksfulla uppenbarelse i mänskligheten: Jesu anträde till sitt medlarekall (adventspsalmer)".
- Svensk psalmbok för den evangelisk-lutherska kyrkan i Finland 1886 as number 4 under the lines "Adventspsalmer".
- Sionstoner 1889 as number 551 under the lines "Psalmer".
- Nya Pilgrimssånger 1892 number 25 of the lines "Om Kristus — Kristi ankomst"
- Svenska Missionsförbundets sångbok 1920 as number 74 under the lines "B. Jesu födelse 73-99"
- Frälsningsarméns sångbok 1929 as number 534 under the lines "Högtider och särskilda tillfällen - Jul".
- Musik till Frälsningsarméns sångbok 1930 as number 534
- Sionstoner 1935 as number 142 under the lines "Advent".
- 1937 års psalmbok as number3 under the lines "Advent".
- Svensk psalmbok för den evangelisk-lutherska kyrkan i Finland 1943 as number 3 under the lines "Advent".
- Sånger för Frälsningsarméns möten 1948 as number 141 under the lines "Hemlands- och speciella sånger".
- Förbundstoner 1957 as number 33 under the lines "Guds uppenbarelse i Kristus: Advent"
- Segertoner 1960 as number 160
- Psalmer för bruk vid krigsmakten 1961 as number 3 verserna 1-4.
- Frälsningsarméns sångbok 1968 as number 580 under the lines "Högtider - Advent".
- Den svenska psalmboken 1986 as number 103 under the lines "Advent".
- Svensk psalmbok för den evangelisk-lutherska kyrkan i Finland (1986) as number 4 without compound i titelraden till "Bered en väg för Herran", under the lines "Advent".
- Lova Herren 1988 as number 87 under the lines "Advent".
- Sångboken 1998 as number 4
- Barnens svenska sångbok, 1999, under the lines "Året runt".
- Julens önskesångbok, 1997, under the lines "Advent" (melody following the Boda tradition, and folk tune).

== Recordings ==
An early recording was done by Engelbrekt's Church Choir on 6 March 1941, and the record was released in November 1950.
