= Boy (duo) =

Swiss–German pop duo

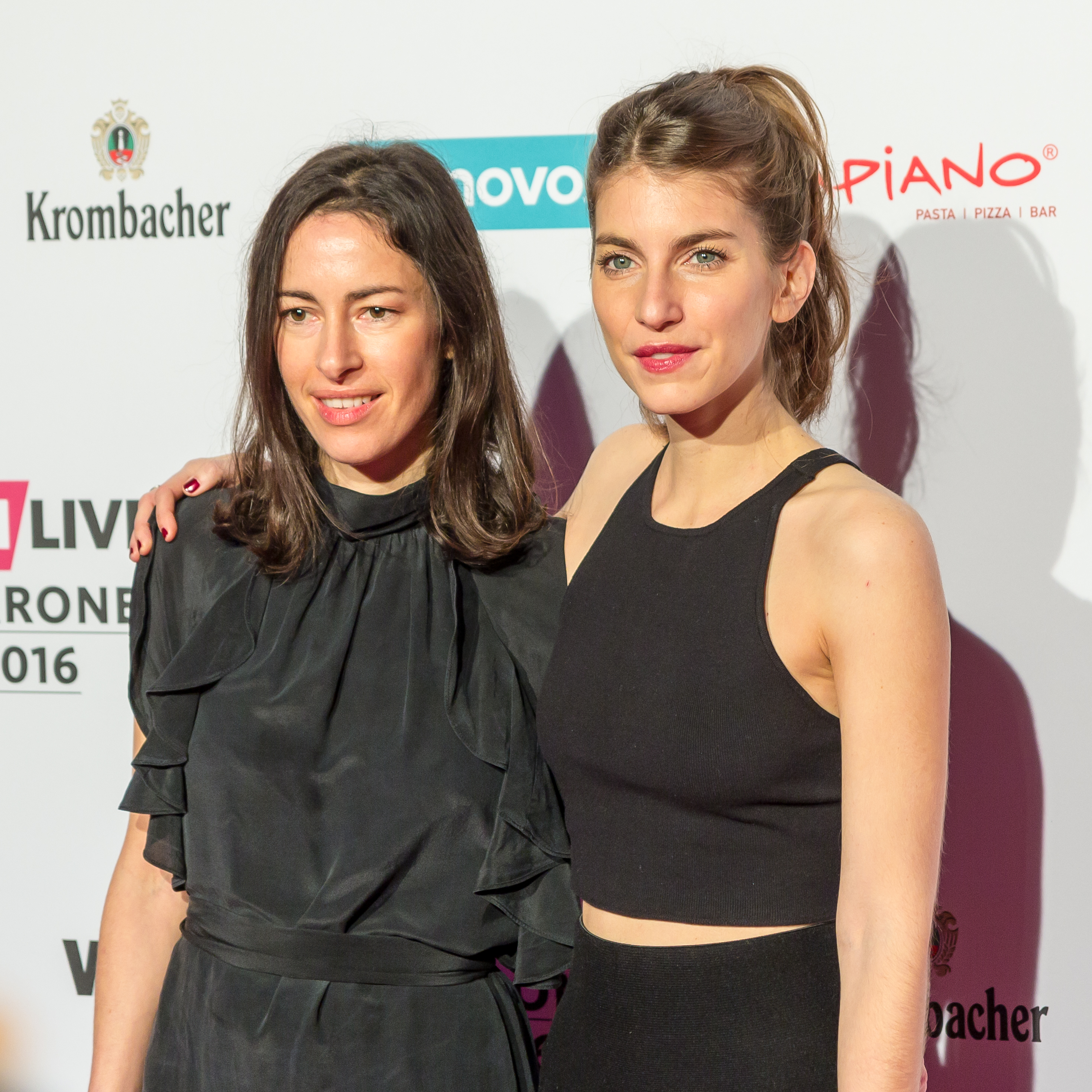
- Boy in December 2016

Background information
- Origin: Zürich; Hamburg
- Genres: Indie music
- Years active: 2007–present
- Labels: Grönland Records
- Members: Valeska Steiner; Sonja Glass
- Website: listentoboy.com

Boy (stylized BOY) is a Swiss–German pop duo founded in 2007 by Swiss singer Valeska Steiner and German bassist Sonja Glass. The two met while at a pop-music course at the Hochschule für Musik und Theater Hamburg in 2005.

== History ==
The duo met at a six-week music course, but then Steiner returned to Switzerland and the two kept in touch rather irregularly. Glass occasionally sent Steiner songs she had just written, but for some time the two did not know what to write about together. The band was formed two years later. The band initially played concerts exclusively, before being discovered by and signed to Herbert Grönemeyer's label, Grönland Records, in 2011.

Their debut album, Mutual Friends was produced by Philipp Steinke and released in the autumn of 2011. The band sings entirely in English in a style reminiscent of that of Leslie Feist. In the UK, Mutual Friends was released by Decca in June 2012. The North American release of the album was in February 2013 on Nettwerk Records. Boy won the Hamburg Musician Prize HANS in 2011 in the category Hamburgs Newcomer of the Year, and their album Mutual Friends won the 2012 European Border Breakers Award (EBBA). The duo's song "Little Numbers" was also featured in the Lufthansa Airline's Business Class advertisement in mid-2012. In 2013, the song was at number 4 in the Japan Hot 100.

The duo's first-ever US tour launched on March 1, 2013, with a sold-out performance at Joe's Pub, New York City. After a two-year hiatus to focus on songwriting, the duo released their second studio album We Were Here in 2015. Their first new music in many years, a song called "Fit Back In", was released in 2021.

== Band members ==
- Valeska Steiner was born in Zurich on October 28, 1985. She grew up surrounded by music, taking piano and singing lessons from the age of seven. She took part in several bands of various styles all through her adolescence, ranging from heavy metal to African music, though at the time she thought of music more as an important part of her life than as a career path. With Glass, she declared it was the first time she felt she was creating something, instead of copying from what already existed.
- Sonja Glass was born in Munich on November 30, 1976. She played the cello until she was "about 18", when a guitar player saw her on the street with the cello after a concert and asked her to play in his band. There she met some girls who were bass players and became interested in the instrument. She did not finish high school, but did study bass in the Netherlands, where she says it is easier to be accepted than in Germany.

== Discography ==
=== Studio albums ===
List of albums, with selected chart positions
Title	Album details	Peak chart positions							Certifications
Title	Album details	SWI	AUT	BEL (FL)	BEL (WA)	FRA	GER	US Indie	Certifications
Mutual Friends	Released: September 2, 2011; Format: CD, download; Label: Grönland Records	6	64	100	121	122	9	33	BVMI: Gold
We Were Here	Released: August 21, 2015; Format: CD, download, streaming; Label: Grönland Records	3	5	166	—	—	3	—	
"—" denotes album that did not chart or was not released

=== EPs ===
List of extended plays, with selected details
Title	Extended play details
Hungry Beast	Released: 2010; Format: CD, download; Label: 380grad

=== Singles ===
List of singles, with selected chart positions, showing year released and album name
Title	Year	Peak chart positions						Album
Title	Year	SWI	BEL (FL)	FRA	GER	JPN	US AAA	Album
"Little Numbers"	2011	56	91	139	65	4	17	Mutual Friends
"Oh Boy"	2012	—	—	—	—	—	—	Mutual Friends
"Waitress"	2012	—	126	—	—	—	—	Mutual Friends
"We Were Here"	2015	74	—	—	57	—	—	We Were Here
"Hit My Heart"	2015	—	—	—	—	—	—	We Were Here
"Fear"	2016	—	—	—	—	—	—	We Were Here
"Fit Back In"	2021	—	—	—	—	—	—	Non-album single
"—" denotes a recording that did not chart or was not released in that territory.

==== Promotional singles ====
List of promotional singles
Title	Year	Album
"Drive Darling"	2012	Mutual Friends
