= Frans Michael Franzén (sculpture) =

Sculpture located in the city centre in Oulu, Finland

Coordinates: 65°00′55″N 025°28′26″E

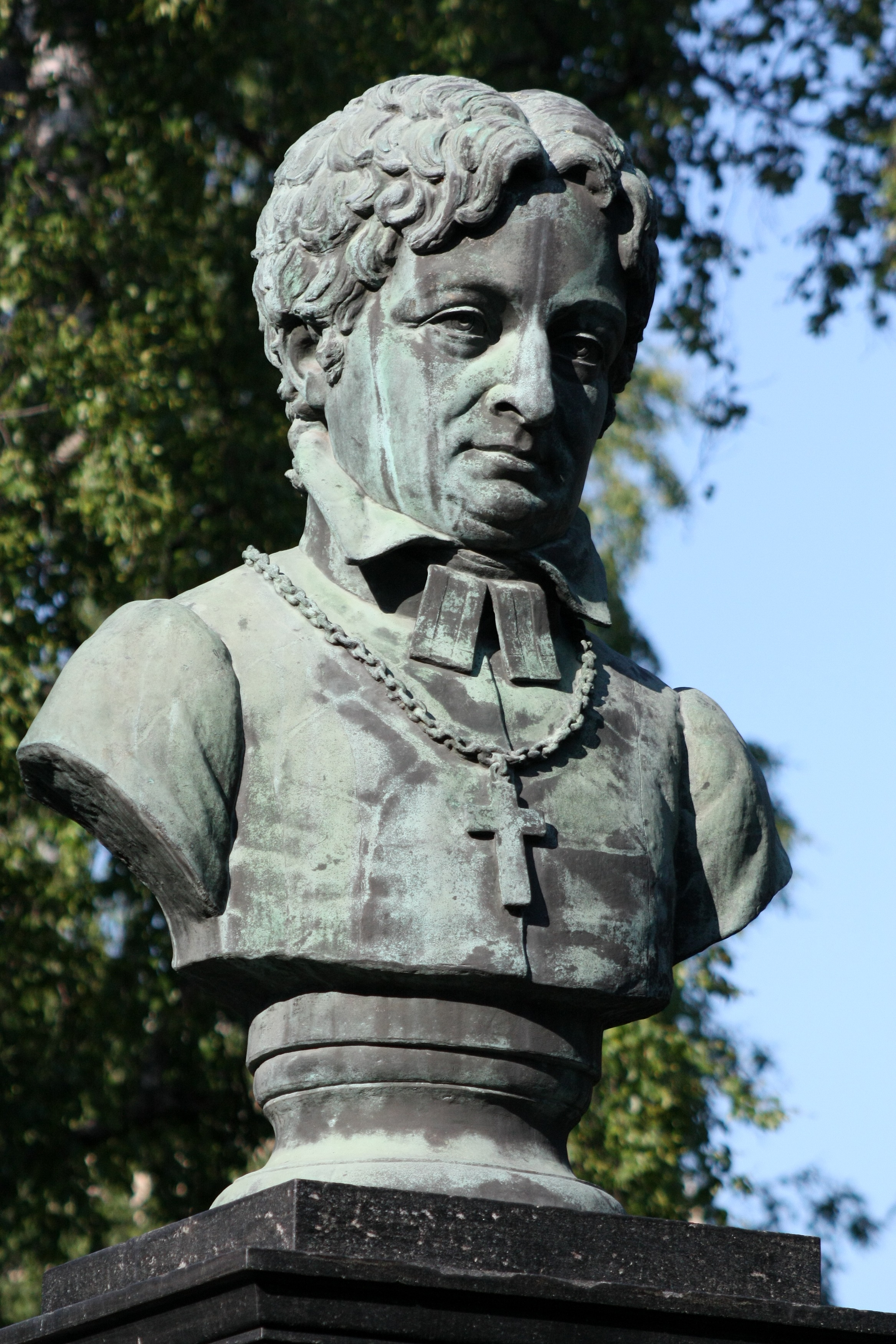
- Artist: Erland Stenberg
- Year: 1879
- Type: Bronze
- Location: Oulu Museum of Art, Oulu

Frans Michael Franzén is an outdoor sculpture located in the city centre in Oulu, Finland. It is the oldest public monument in Oulu.

The bronze bust of Oulu-born poet Frans Michael Franzén was made by Finnish sculptor Erland Stenberg, while he was working in Paris in 1878–1879. The unveiling of the sculpture in 1881 was a major social event in Oulu. The Church Square on which the bust was erected was later converted to a park and named Franzén Park.
