= Daniel Lindström (album) =

Studio album by Daniel Lindström
- Released: December 15, 2004
- Label: RCA, BMG
- Producer: BAG, Rickard Brandén, Jörgen Elofsson, Jay Jay, Peter Kvint, Jan Lundkvist, Peter Nordahl, RedOne, Johan Röhr, Rootation, Pär Westerlund

Daniel Lindström chronology
| Daniel Lindström (2004) | Nån slags verklighet (2006) |

Daniel Lindström is the debut album of Swedish pop singer Daniel Lindström, released in 2004.

== Track listing ==
| No. | Title | Writer(s) | Producer(s) | Length |
|---|---|---|---|---|
| 1. | "Break Free" (Alexander cover) | Andreas Carlsson, Marcus Englöf, Lisa Greene, Samuel Waermö | RedOne | 2:50 |
| 2. | "Coming True" | Jörgen Elofsson | Rickard Brandén, Elofsson, Pär Westerlund | 3:40 |
| 3. | "My Love Won't Let You Down" | Gordon Chambers, RedOne | RedOne | 3:43 |
| 4. | "A Life Without You" | Elofsson, Dan Hill | Brandén, Elofsson, Westerlund | 3:56 |
| 5. | "Run" | Peter Kvint | Kvint | 3:27 |
| 6. | "Take It to Heart" (Michael McDonald cover) | Michael McDonald, Diane Warren | Jan Lundkvist | 4:13 |
| 7. | "Two Star" (Everything but the Girl cover) | Ben Watt | Peter Nordahl | 4:05 |
| 8. | "One Way Street" | Martin Hedström, Kvint | Kvint | 3:47 |
| 9. | "Got to Be You" | Kvint, Helienne Lindvall | Kvint | 3:19 |
| 10. | "Where Was Love?" | Anders Bagge, Jonas Jeberg, Robbie Nevil | BAG, Jay Jay | 3:38 |
| 11. | "Still Holding On" | Johan Röhr, Rootation | Röhr, Rootation | 3:20 |

== Chart positions ==
=== Weekly charts ===
| Chart (2004–05) | Peak position |
|---|---|
| Swedish Albums (Sverigetopplistan) | 1 |

=== Year-end charts ===
| Chart (2004) | Position |
|---|---|
| Swedish Albums (Sverigetopplistan) | 7 |
| Chart (2005) | Position |
| Swedish Albums (Sverigetopplistan) | 96 |
