= Stockholm Diary =

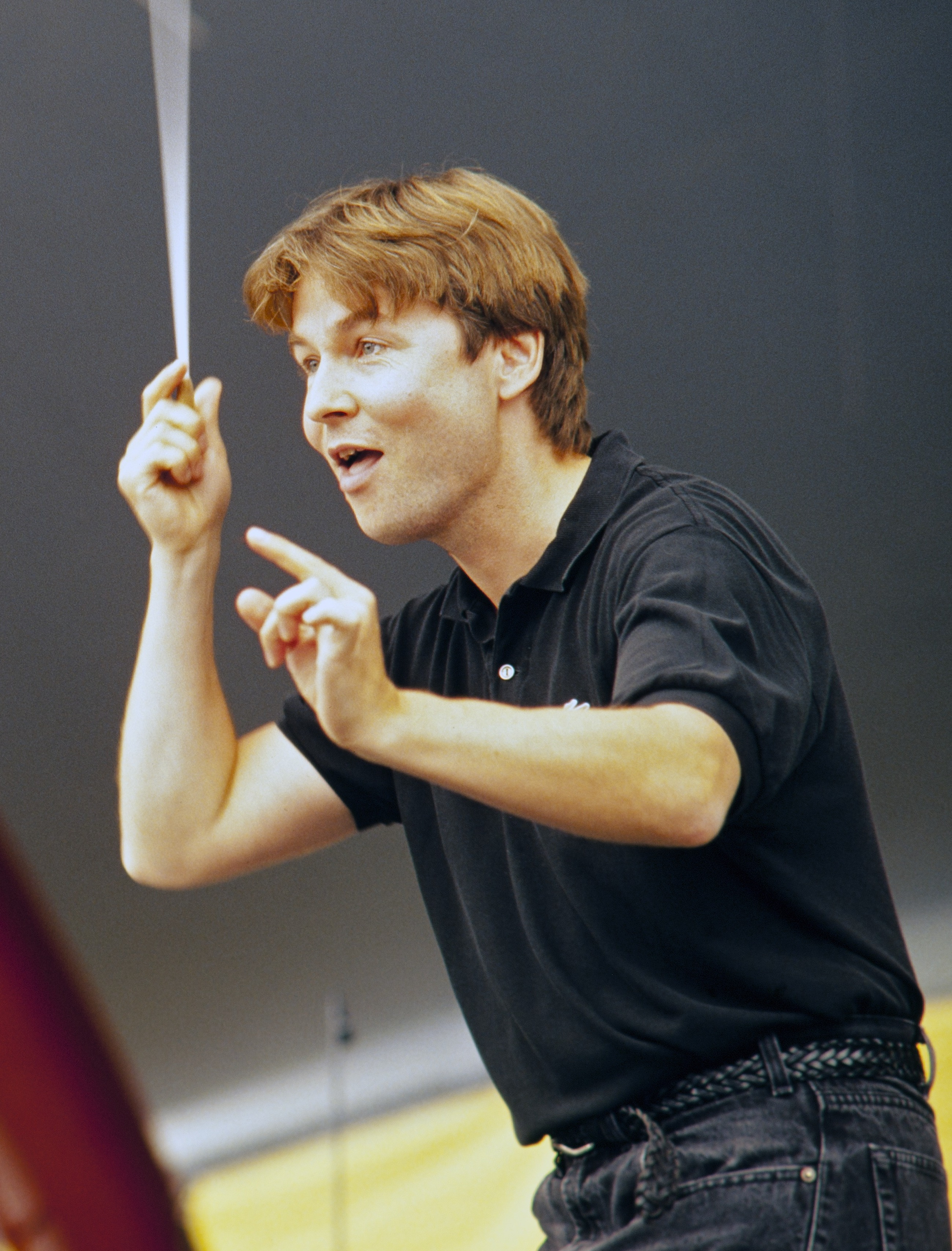
Esa-Pekka Salonen in 1997

Stockholm Diary is a composition for string orchestra by the Finnish composer Esa-Pekka Salonen. The work was commissioned by the Stockholm Concert Hall Foundation for the Royal Stockholm Philharmonic Orchestra and the Stockholm Chamber Orchestra. It was first performed in Stockholm, on October 27, 2004, by the Royal Stockholm Philharmonic Orchestra under Salonen.

== Composition ==
Stockholm Diary is composed in a single movement and has a duration of roughly 12 minutes. The music briefly quotes passages from Salonen's 2004 orchestral piece Wing on Wing, written shortly before Stockholm Diary.

== Reception ==
Mark Swed of the Los Angeles Times called it "a boisterous, significant 13-minute score for string orchestra" and wrote, "The string textures are gorgeous, creamy as Richard Strauss but with enough hints of Sibelian reserve to avoid stickiness." Swed added, "Salonen's strange harmonies make the music immediately recognizable as his." Ivan Hewett of The Daily Telegraph was more critical, however, remarking, "It was clearly a busy time for Salonen, but that’s about all I gleaned from this frenetically active piece." Erica Jeal of The Guardian called the piece "a larger-scale conception of broad sweeps and teeming textures that unleashed the full orchestra sound, even if the ending, an abrupt petering out, was unconvincing."
