= Asher Lane =

Rock music group from Germany

- Origin: Berlin & Hamburg, Germany
- Genres: Rock
- Members: Finn Martin (Vocals / Guitar); Philipp Steinke (Keys / Vocals); Anthony Thet (Lead Guitars); Sonja Glass (Bass); Marco Möller (Drums)

Asher Lane is a five-piece rock group from Germany. They have reached considerable success in the German charts, reaching 5 in the German airplay charts with "Explain".

== Formation ==
Asher Lane was founded by the five musicians who decided they wanted to "aim for moments with strong emotions for the audience and for us".

== Outside Germany ==
Previous to 2006 Asher Lane had limited success outside of Germany itself. A version of the #32 peaking "New Days" single was used in a marketing campaign by the Nivea dermological group, and has caused interest in the group from within the United Kingdom and America.

== Discography ==
- Beautiful Falling, released Mar 2, 2007 on label Exzess Berlin
- Neon Love, released Oct 10, 2008 on label Exzess Berlin
