= Lin Yu-chun =

Taiwanese musical artist (born 1986)

- Born: 9 March 1986 (age 40); Linkou, Taipei County (now New Taipei City), Taiwan
- Occupations: Singer, musician, songwriter
- Years active: 2010–present

Chinese name
- Traditional Chinese: 林育羣
- Simplified Chinese: 林育群
Transcriptions
Standard Mandarin
- Hanyu Pinyin: Lín Yùqún
Yue: Cantonese
- Jyutping: Lam^{4} Juk^{6} Kwan^{4}
- Musical career
- Also known as: Jimmy Lin
- Genres: Pop
- Label: Sony Music Taiwan

Lin Yu-chun (Chinese: 林育羣; pinyin: Lín Yùqún; Wade–Giles: Lin^{2} Yü^{4}-ch'ün^{2}); born 9 March 1986 in Taipei) is a Taiwanese singer, who gained fame by appearing on a Taiwanese talent show, One Million Star (超級星光大道), singing "I Will Always Love You" (written and originally sung by Dolly Parton) in the style of Whitney Houston's cover version. Lin is well known for his mezzo-soprano-like, and sometimes, contralto-like countertenor singing voice, although he has an adult speaking voice. According to many sources, Lin's voice is usually described as a mixture of Whitney Houston and Susan Boyle, with a dash of Cher. When Lin sings in his normal masculine voice rather than in a falsetto range, his voice actually somewhat sounds like Jamie Walters, or even possibly like Jackson Browne, and to a lesser extent, George Harrison.. In 2013, he competed in the second season of The Voice of China.

== Biography ==
Lin was voted off the show, but after a video of Lin singing the song made it onto YouTube, Lin became an internet celebrity, receiving more than 10,000,000 views of his performance. Many news sources dubbed Lin "Taiwan's Susan Boyle". In an interview, Lin Yu Chun explained that he selected "I Will Always Love You" to show his gratitude to his grandmother for taking care of Lin over the years.

In April 2010, he visited the United States and performed "I Will Always Love You" and Amazing Grace on The Ellen DeGeneres Show. On the same trip, he attended Lopez Tonight and performed "Saving All My Love for You" (also a Whitney Houston cover) and Total Eclipse of the Heart (originally by Bonnie Tyler) as a duet with William Shatner.

Sony Music Taiwan announced they had signed Lin Yu Chun to a record deal. Lin Yu-chun's signing press conference occurred on 13 May 2010, and was held in Shanghai San Want Hotel.

On 22 May 2010, at Dodger Stadium during a Los Angeles Dodgers game, he sang "The Star-Spangled Banner", "God Bless America" and "Taiwan, Touch Your Heart". On 11 August 2010 Lin sang Whitney Houston's "I Will Always Love You" on America's Got Talent season 5 on the YouTube selection episode, receiving a standing ovation from the crowd. Lin has been slated to play the role of Liu Lucy for the HBO Asia produced miniseries Untold Stories of 1949. In 2013, he competed in the second season of The Voice of China.

== One Million Star ==
On 26 March 2010, Lin sang John Newton's "Amazing Grace", earning Lin 24 points (his opponent, Zhang Shi-Tang, got 19 points).
On 2 April 2010, Lin sang Whitney Houston's "I Will Always Love You", earning Lin 25 points (his opponent, Su Zhi-Yu, got 22 points).
On 9 April 2010, Lin sang Shunza's "Coming Home" – 17 points (his opponent, Zhang Shi-Tang, got 20 points)
On 30 April 2010, Lin sang Celine Dion's "My Heart Will Go On" as a guest performer.
On 14 May 2010, Lin sang "I Dreamed a Dream" from Les Misérables as a guest performer.
Lin also sang a duet with Kenny G., performing Whitney Houston's "Saving All My Love For You".

== Discography ==
=== I Will Always Love You (2010) SICP-2778 ===
Lin Yu Chun's debut is a mini-album, I Will Always Love You, released in Japanese on 8 September 2010 specially for the Japanese market. It contains four songs from Lin's upcoming international debut, It's My Time, and a Japanese-only bonus track, "Hello," a Japanese cover of Lionel Richie's hit from 1984.

==== Track listing ====
No.	Title	Length
1.	"Amazing Grace"	3:36
2.	"I Will Always Love You"	4:57
3.	"It's My Time"	3:31
4.	"Under Your Wings"	4:07
5.	"Hello"	4:23

=== It's My Time (2010) ===
Lin's full-length international debut album, It's My Time, was released on 17 September 2010, as a compilation of English-language pop songs previously recorded by major artists such as Mariah Carey, Kelly Clarkson, etc. The song "Under Your Wings" was written new for this album by Grammy-winning musician Walter Afanasieff.

==== Track listing ====
No.	Title	Length
1.	"I Will Always Love You"	4:58
2.	"Amazing Grace"	3:40
3.	"It's My Time"	3:34
4.	"Total Eclipse of the Heart"	5:32
5.	"Under Your Wings"	4:09
6.	"I Understand"	4:00
7.	"Hero"	4:17
8.	"A Moment Like This"	4:18
9.	"My Heart Will Go On"	4:34
10.	"Fighter"	4:17

=== 未來的第一站 (2010) ===
==== Track listing ====
No.	Title	Length
1.	"未來的第一站"	4:30
2.	"It's My Time"	3:33
3.	"一個人生活"	4:31
4.	"星星 (I Am Not a Star)"	5:19
5.	"蛻變"	4:00
6.	"海闊天空"	4:50
7.	"存在"	4:08
8.	"累格"	5:08
9.	"I Will Always Love You"	4:58
10.	"Amazing Grace"	4:08
11.	"未來的第一站組曲"	6:26

=== Endlessly (2011) ===
==== Track listing ====
No.	Title	Length
1.	"Saving Grace (Roxanne Seeman, Philipp Steinke, Finn Martin)"	3:50
2.	"Endlessly"	5:04
3.	"Stay For Awhile"	4:06
4.	"Tonight I'm Not Alone"	3:46
5.	"Good Isn't Good Enough"	4:14
6.	"My Love Will Follow You"	4:04
7.	"Close to You"	3:46
8.	"Greatest Love of All"	4:45
9.	"Last Christmas"	5:18
10.	"Our Song"	3:39
11.	"100 Percent Happiness"	3:45
12.	"Believe in Love"	4:52
13.	"Finding You in a Sea of People (REN HAI ZHONG YU JIAN NI)"	3:52

== MV Performance ==
=== Guest Performance ===
- 2009 - "H2H" by Cyndi Wang
- 2021 - "Ain't Gonna Wait" (Seeman-Lau-Wen-Wu) by Rose Liu (Liu Mingxiang 刘明湘)

=== Promo Videos ===
- May 2010 - Haagon Dazs advertisement
- October 2010 - VL Sports (緯來體育台) advertisement
- January 2011 - The Body Shop advertisement
- January 2014 - "Carchs" advertisement
- June 2015 - Yanjing Beer advertisement
