= Nån slags verklighet =

Studio album by Daniel Lindström
- Released: August 2006
- Genre: pop
- Length: 48 minutes
- Label: Sony BMG Entertainment
- Producer: Oskar Söderberg

Daniel Lindström chronology
Daniel Lindström (2004)	Nån slags verklighet (2006)	D-Day (2009)

Nån slags verklighet was released in August 2006, and is a Daniel Lindström studio album.

== Track listing ==
1. Beslut (Lindström/Berger)
2. Ingen är som du (Lindström/Wallstén)
3. Annars stod vi aldrig här (Lindström/Wallstén)
4. Bara nu (Lindström/Berger)
5. Nån slags verklighet (Lindström/Wollbeck/Lindblom/Garvin/Berger)
6. Det finns inget bättre (Lindström/Söderberg)
7. Tänk om himlen föll (Lindström/Söderberg/Sahlin)
8. Sarah (Scocco)
9. Kristaller (Lindström/Wallstén)
10. Tyst och tomt (Lindström/Söderberg)
11. Du får aldrig vända om (Lindström/Röhr/Littwold)

== Contributors ==
- Daniel Lindström - singer
- Jennie Abrahamson - choir
- Oskar Söderberg - producer
- Adam Kårsnäs - percussion
- Jimmy Wahlsteen - guitar
- Tobias Gabrielsson - bass
- Gustav Karlöf - keyboard

== Chart positions ==
Chart (2006)	Peak position
Sweden	3
