= Tollak Ollestad =

American singer-songwriter

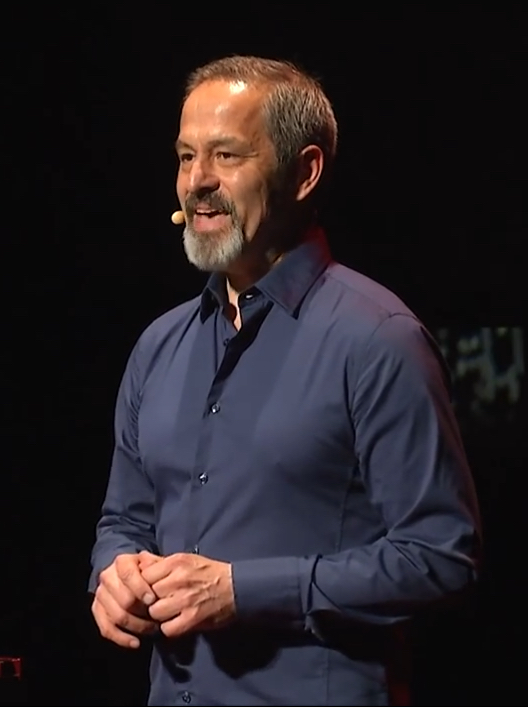
- Ollestad at TEDx Groningen 2016

Background information
- Born: Seward, Alaska, United States
- Occupations: Instrumentalist, singer, songwriter
- Instruments: Harmonica, keyboard
- Formerly of: Ambrosia
- Website: tollak.com

Tollak Ollestad is an American harmonica player, singer, keyboardist and songwriter. He is best known for his harmonica feature performance on the Northern Exposure TV series theme and on recordings by artists including Christopher Cross, Al Jarreau, Earth Wind and Fire, Natalie Cole, Gino Vannelli, Dave Grusin, and Billy Idol among others and his live performance with major touring artists.

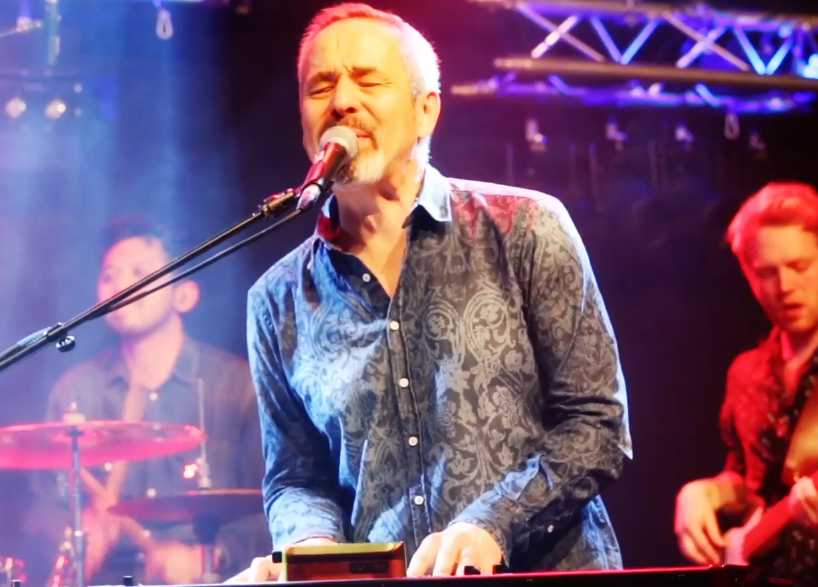
Tollak performing in the Netherlands, 2015

== Early life ==
Tollak Ollestad was born in Seward, Alaska and grew up in Seattle, Washington. After starting out in the club scene in Seattle in his early twenties he moved to Los Angeles in 1984.

== Career ==
He first became known as keyboardist/singer touring with artists Ambrosia and Bobby Caldwell. Around the same time he started gaining notoriety as a session harmonica player, starting with being featured in the theme for the television series Northern Exposure, and then a series of live credits with artists such as Don Henley, Andrea Bocelli, Chet Atkins and Kenny Loggins as well as features on several artist's albums including Al Jarreau, Earth Wind and Fire, Natalie Cole, Gino Vannelli, Christopher Cross, Dave Grusin, Don Grusin, Billy Idol, M83 and Brian McKnight. As a keyboardist/vocalist he has additionally toured or performed live with other artists including Michael McDonald, Kenny Loggins, Sheena Easton, Jewel, Edgar Winter, Al Stewart, David Becker, and Seal.

Ollestad performed "Canzoni Stonate" live with Andrea Bocelli at his "Amore Under the Desert Sky" Concert. The concert was recorded at the Lake Las Vegas Resort in December 2005.

Ollestad has also released three albums of original music independently, respectively "Walk the Earth" 2004, "Across the Rubicon" 2009 and "Tollak live" 2016.

Ollestad's harmonica is featured on Jacky Cheung's Zhǎo Duì Nǐ (Which Way, Robert Frost?)" from his "Private Corner" canto-jazz album. Ollestad was chosen from a selection of harmonica players presented to Cheng's producer by Roxanne Seeman and recorded his harmonica part for the project in The Netherlands.

He moved to the Netherlands in 2004 where he currently resides and continues to perform, record and teach, as well as elsewhere in Europe, America and other venues worldwide.

Ollestad's research and work at the Academy for pop culture in the Netherlands led to his appearance at the TEDx conference in Groningen, the Netherlands in 2016. The talk is titled "Discovering the musical subconscious" and is a discourse, along with musical demonstration, on the need for increased awareness and focus on the "intuitive-subconscious" connection to learning, making and performing music. A connection he argues is as deeply interwoven into the human psyche as language. In 2021, he joined the fourth season of The Voice Senior. He picked Gerard Joling as his coach, and eventually made it into the finals.
