= Mutual Friends (album) =

Studio album by BOY
- Released: September 2, 2011
- Genre: Alternative rock
- Length: 48:11
- Label: Grönland
- Producer: Philipp Steinke

BOY chronology
Mutual Friends (2011)	We Were Here (2015)

Singles from Mutual Friends
- 1. "Little Numbers" Released: 29 August 2011; 2. "Oh Boy" Released: 29 June 2012; 3. "Waitress" Released: 30 July 2012

Mutual Friends is the debut album by Swiss-German pop duo BOY. It was released on September 2, 2011, by Grönland Records. It was later released in the UK by Decca Records in June 2012. In February 2013, Nettwerk Records released it in North America. Of the album's twelve tracks, three became singles. Both of the band's music videos, "Little Numbers" and "Oh Boy" came from this album as well. The album received the 2012 European Border Breakers Award.

Professional ratings
Aggregate scores
Source	Rating
Metacritic	80/100
Review scores
Source	Rating
Allmusic	4/5 stars

== Track listing ==
All song were written by BOY and produced by Philipp Steinke.

No.	Title	Length
1.	"This Is the Beginning"	3:31
2.	"Waitress"	3:15
3.	"Army"	3:11
4.	"Little Numbers"	3:42
5.	"Drive Darling"	4:25
6.	"Railway"	3:54
7.	"Waltz For Pony"	3:43
8.	"Boris"	3:21
9.	"Oh Boy"	3:38
10.	"Skin"	4:07
11.	"Silver Streets"	5:31
12.	"July"	5:53
Total length:		48:11

Bonus tracks
No.	Title	Length
13.	"Little Numbers" (acoustic) (LP and iTunes)	3:41

Limited Edition bonus tracks
No.	Title	Length
1.	"Waitress" (acoustic)	2:35
2.	"Drive Darling" (acoustic)	3:52
3.	"Little Numbers" (acoustic)	3:41
4.	"Boris" (acoustic)	3:24
5.	"Skin" (acoustic)	3:21
6.	"Oh Boy" (acoustic)	3:36
7.	"July" (acoustic)	4:15
8.	"Playground Love" (only available on Mutual Friends Acoustic)	3:39
Total length:		28:23

== Personnel ==
- Valeska Steiner - vocals, percussion, acoustic guitar, Melodica
- Sonja Glass - bass, acoustic guitar, programming, banjo, cello, organ
- Philipp Steinke - guitar, piano, keyboards
- Carl-Michael Grabinger, Thomas Hedlund, Bela Brauckmann, Marco Römer - drums
- Christian Kreutzer - guitar, banjo
- Jörg Sander, Deniz Erarslan, Thomas Hahn - guitar
- Percussion - Marco Möller
- Vibraphone - Eric Darken

Additional musicians:

- Choir - Jule Escherhaus
- Viola - John Catchings, Kris Wilkinson
- Violin - David Angell, David Davidson
- Clarinet - Taco Van Hettinga
- French Horn - Stefan Jon Bernharosson
- Trombone - Helgi Hrafn Jonsson, Jessica Buzbee
- Trumpet - Ari Bragi Karason
- Tuba - Timothy Buzbee

Other:

- Mario Lombardo - Artwork

Recorded & produced at Hahn & Hahn, LowSwing Tonstudio, Zwischengeschoss Mastering at Skyline Tonfabrik by Jens Dreesen, Kai Blankenberg

Credits as per discogs

== Charts ==
=== Weekly charts ===
Chart (2011–2026)	Peak position
Austrian Albums (Ö3 Austria)	64
Belgian Albums (Ultratop Flanders)	100
Belgian Albums (Ultratop Wallonia)	121
French Albums (SNEP)	122
German Albums (Offizielle Top 100)	9
German Pop Albums (Offizielle Top 100)	19
Swiss Albums (Schweizer Hitparade)	6

=== Year-end charts ===
Chart (2011)	Position
German Albums (Offizielle Top 100)	91
