= Keith Chan Siu-kei =

Hong Kong lyricist and record producer (born 1964)

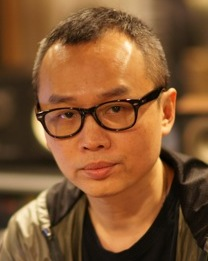
- Chan in October 2009
- Born: 18 June 1964 (age 62); Hong Kong
- Occupations: Lyricist, Producer
- Years active: 1986-Present

Chinese name
- Traditional Chinese: 陳少琪
- Simplified Chinese: 陈少琪
Transcriptions
Standard Mandarin
- Hanyu Pinyin: Chén Shàoqí
Yue: Cantonese
- Jyutping: Can4 Siu2kei4
- Musical career
- Also known as: Keith Chan

Keith Chan Siu-kei (Chinese: 陳少琪) is a Hong Kong lyricist and record producer. Since 1984, he has written over 3,000 Cantonese and Mandarin songs and won numerous awards from various Internet media in Hong Kong and Mainland China, including Best Chinese Lyrics Awards and Best Chinese Song Awards. His work can be found in albums released by many Hong Kong singers, including Jacky Cheung, Hacken Lee, Andy Lau, Aaron Kwok, and Gigi Leung.

Chan wrote the lyrics of "The Song of the Sunset" (夕陽之歌) for Anita Mui as a theme song of the 1989 film, A Better Tomorrow III. The song (besides Priscilla Chan's counterpart, "Chin Chin Kuet Gaw" [千千闕歌]) is a Cantonese rendition of Kōji Makaino's Japanese song, "The Song of the Sunset" (夕焼けの歌, Yūyake no uta).

Chan, alongside composer Peter Kam Pui-tat, wrote the lyrics of "We Are Ready", the theme song for the 2008 Summer Olympics, held in Beijing, sung by various singers as an ensemble. Then he and Kam composed "I Can Fly" (我飛故我在), which Film Business Asia critic Derek Elley considered "half-memorable" but unsuccessful "at being an anthemnal [sic], uplifting ballad", for the 2010 Chinese adaptation of High School Musical, Disney High School Musical China (歌舞青春), which Elley rated three points out of ten.

In 2014, he and composer Su Yicheng (蘇亦承) wrote "Tears Of Time" (時間有淚) for Jacky Cheung's Mandopop album, Wake Up Dreaming.

In 2017, Chan was nominated the Best Lyricist of the Year (年度最佳作詞人) for lyricizing "Dear Leslie", sung by Leo Ku but did not win at the 2017 Chinese Music Awards.
