= Andrew Tuason =

Andrew Tuason 杜自持
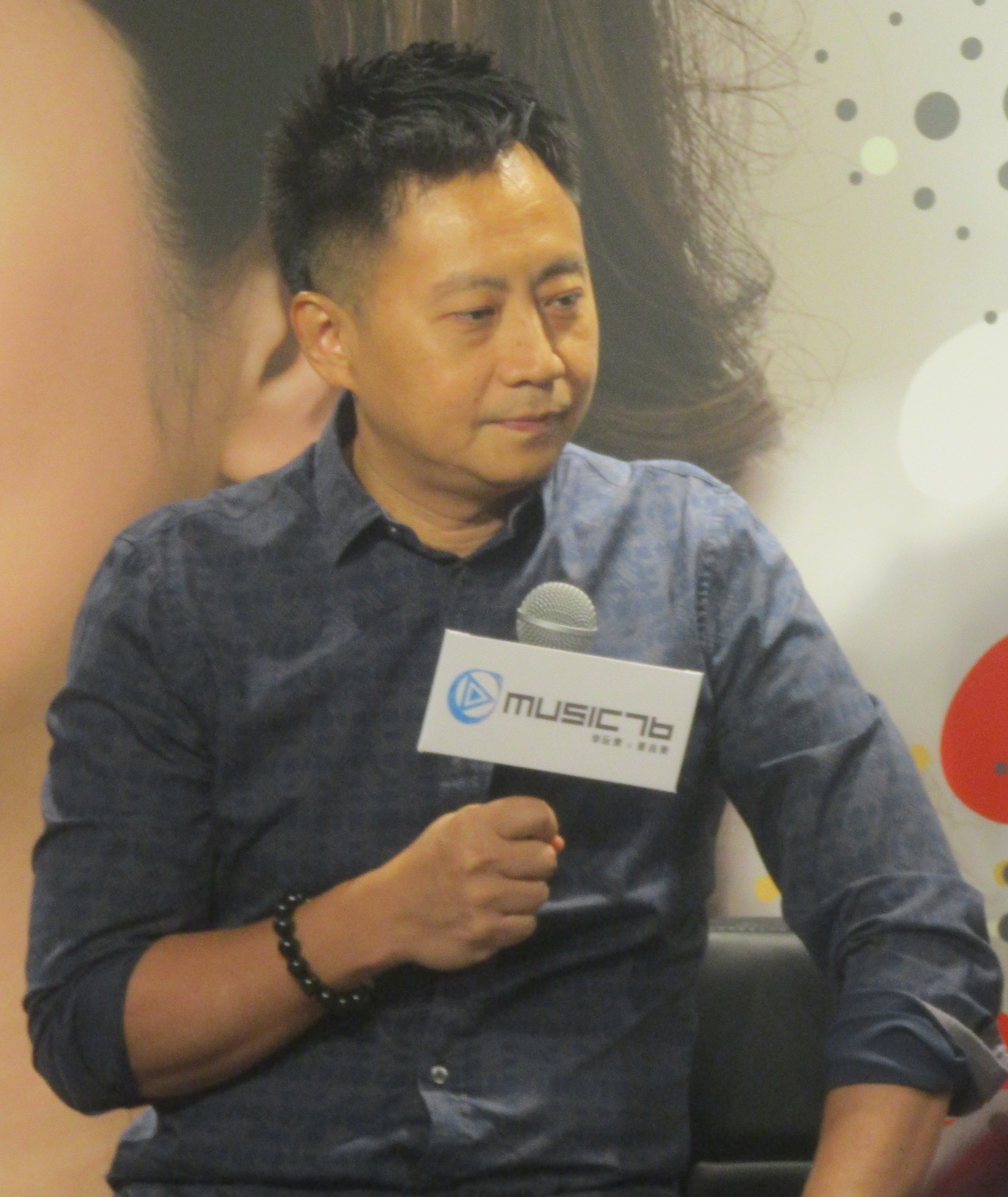
- Andrew Tuason

Background information
- Born: 30 November 1962 (age 63); Hong Kong
- Genres: Cantopop, Mandopop, operatic pop, jazz fusionPop, pop rock, R&B
- Occupations: Musical Director, record producer, songwriter, arranger
- Instruments: Piano, keyboards, synthesizer
- Years active: 1983–present

Chinese name
- Traditional Chinese: 杜自持
Transcriptions
Standard Mandarin
- Hanyu Pinyin: Du Zichi

Andrew Tuason (born 30 November 1962) is a Hong Kong musician, record producer, composer, songwriter, arranger, conductor and musical director. He has been a producer and musical director for notable artists including Jacky Cheung, Andy Lau, Jackie Chan, Alan Tam and Coco Lee.

== Early life ==
Tuason was born in Hong Kong, the son of Bading Tuason, musical director for the Hong Kong Hilton from 1968 - 1996. Tuason was classically trained by concert pianist Fredrick Choi. In 1982, Tuason became assistant to Joseph Koo, known as the Godfather of Cantopop. Koo became Tuason's mentor in his musical career and entry into the Hong Kong music business.

Working as an assistant for Koo, Tuason showed his skills and talent as an arranger and keyboardist to many major records label in Hong Kong. Tuason became arranger, keyboardist, or composer for artists including: Jacky Cheung, Sam Hui, Alan Tam, Paula Tsui, Michael Kwan, Roman Tam, Jenny Tsang, Shirley Kwan, Sandy Lam, Cass Pang, Eason Chan, Coco Lee, Faye Wong, Andy Lau, among others.

== Career ==
Tuason first met with Andy Lau in the late 80s when he was hired as a musical director and pianist for Lau for his North America concert tour, at the time Lau was a newcomer in singing career but he was already popular and famous in TVs and movies, the two work closely together after their US tour and Tuason began to produce Lau recording albums since then.

In 1992, Tuason and Lau formed the record label: New Melody, and the recording studio Q-Sound Studio in Tsim Sha Tsui area. Q-Sound Studio became one of the busiest studios in the Hong Kong music business. From 1992 to 1996, Tuason produced 7 solo albums for Lau and composed Lau's hit track "Ai Bu Wan". The song reached number one on all major pop charts in HK both on radio and TVs. Of the 7 albums Tuason produced for Lau, more than half became top-selling Cantopop albums in the 90s. During those years, Tuason was Lau's musical director performing more than 60 live concerts together.

In 1996, Tuason joined EMI HK as A&R Director, his biggest achievement in EMI was on Cass Pang "Chuang Wai" album which sold more than 300,000 copies alone. In 1997, Tuason was appointed by Television Broadcast Ltd as Musical Director for the ceremony of Hong Kong Reunification to China where he arranged and conducted the Hong Kong Philharmonic Orchestra and Chinese Orchestra combined, performing the China classical masterpiece "The Yellow River Piano Concerto". Tuason invited his classical piano teacher, the well-known concert pianist in HK Cai Chong Li to play on the Piano Concerto.

During 2004 and 2005, Tuason was the musical director for the Jacky Cheung musical Snow, Wolf, Lake. Cheung and Tuason toured together with some 80 crew members in China and Hong Kong for more than 50 musical shows. Cheung and Tuason continued working closely together on Snow, Wolf, Lake followed by two world tours of over 250 concerts. Tuason produced Jacky Cheung’s albums Private Corner in 2009 and Wake up Dreaming in 2014.

On January 13, 2020, Tuason made his debut appearance as musical director and solo pianist on China National TV (东方卫视 Oriental TV Shanghai) for the duet competition of Hacken Lee and Zhou Shen on the most popular TV musical program in 2019 - (我们的歌), Tuason re-arranged Jacky Cheung classic song "Your name, my Surname" with which the duet won first prize in the competition, the video clip has seen by over 5 million online viewers in China alone, and the review was overwhelming by the public.

In 2022, the Hong Kong government Leisure Culture and Services Department organized the "Jazz Up" series presenting "The Andrew Tuason Big Band". "LCSD to present "Jazz Up" Series: "The Andrew Tuason Big Band" concert in September" (Press release). Hong Kong.

In 2023, Tuason performed with his jazz ensemble at the Guangzhou Jazz Festival in Guangdong Province.

== Andy Lau ==
Tuason began producing Andy Lau of The Four Heavenly Kings in 1988. Tuason continued producing, arranging and composing for seven albums by Andy Lau from 1988 - 1996.

== EMI Asia ==
Tuason became A&R Director for EMI Asia from 1996 - 1999. During this time, he was in charge of the repertoire of all of EMI Hong Kong's recording artists.

== Jacky Cheung ==
Tuason began arranging for Jacky Cheung in 1985 until the present. In 2004, Tuason conducted Jacky Cheung's musical production "Snow, Wolf, Lake".

In 2009, Tuason produced Jacky Cheung's "Private Corner" album, Cheung's first jazz album for which he coined the phrase "Canto-jazz". "Everyday Is Christmas", "Which Way, Robert Frost?", "Let It Go", "Lucky in Love" and "Double Trouble" were co-written by Roxanne Seeman in collaboration with Tuason, tailor-made for Cheung. "Lucky in Love" is the end-credit song of "Crossing Hennessy", Hong Kong movie starring Jacky Cheung and Tang Wei, produced by William Kong. Nokia's music download service website (Ovi.com) announced that "Everyday Is Christmas" was the 10th most downloaded Christmas song in the world in 2010, joining classic hits such as Wham's ‘Last Christmas’ and Mariah Carey's "All I Want for Christmas is You". Cheung is the only Chinese language singer to make it into the Top Ten.

== Andrew Tuason Orchestra ==
In 2021, Tuason founded the Andrew Tuason Orchestra. October 2024, Andrew Tuason Orchestra planned tribute concert performances of Percy Faith and Henry Mancini compositions.

== Awards & achievement ==
- 1987 RTHK Top Ten Chinese Gold songs award - Winner (Best Arranger) for Danny Chan song "My Story"
- 1991 RTHK Top Ten Chinese Gold songs award - Ten Best Gold Song award (Songwriter) for Andy Lau song "Ai Bu Wan"
- 1991 Shanghai Asia Music Competition - Winner (Best Songwriter) for Anthony Lun song "Goodbye My Love"
- 1997 Appointment by Television and Broadcast Ltd and Beijing Television BTV as the musical director for the 1997 Handover Ceremony of Hong Kong
- 2006 TVB Jade Solid Gold Best 10 Awards - Winner (Best Arranger) for Andy Lau song "Open your Eyes"
- 2009 Guangzhou Music Extravaganza Award - Winner (Best Songwriter) for Hins Cheung song "Wedding Ring"
- 2011 Global Chinese Gold song Award - Winner (Best song Producer) for Jacky Cheung Album "Private Corner"

== Producer credits ==
- Jacky Cheung - Private Corner
- Jacky Cheung - Private Corner Mini-Concert
- Jacky Cheung - 1/2 Century Tour
- Jacky Cheung - Wake Up Dreaming
- Andy Lau - from 1990 to 1995 for 7 albums
- Cass Pang - from 1996 to 1999 for 5 albums
- George Lam 2 albums
- Eric Moo 3 albums
- Jenny Tseng
- Hins Cheung
- Joey Yung
- Dave Wang
- Sam Lee
- Kenny Bee - To Bee Continue

== Musical Director ==
- Jacky Cheung
- Jackie Chan
- Andy Lau
- Sandy Lam
- Kenny Bee
- Faye Wong
- Coco Lee
- George Lam
- Sally Yeh
- Jenny Tseng
- Eric Moo
- Priscilla Chan
- Danny Chan
- Hacken Lee
- Vivian Chow
- Alan Tam
- Dave Wang
- Joey Yung
- Hins Cheung

== Arranger ==
- Jacky Cheung
- Andy Lau
- Coco Lee
- Sandy Lam
- George Lam
- Jenny Tseng
- Danny Chan
- Cass Pang
- Eric Moo
- Jackie Chan
- Faye Wong
- Kelly Chan
- Joey Yung
- Hins Cheung
- Kenny Bee
- Alan Tam
- Stefanie Sun
- Hacken Lee
- Roman Tam
- Dave Wang

== Composer ==
- Andy Lau
- Sandy Lam
- Hacken Lee
- Cass Pang
- Faye Wong
- Eric Moo
- Dave Wang
- Jeff Chang
- Jenny Tseng
- George Lam
- Danny Chan
