= Coming True =

Single by Daniel Lindström

from the album Daniel Lindström
- Released: 6 December 2004
- Recorded: 2004
- Length: 3:40
- Songwriter(s): Jörgen Elofsson

Daniel Lindström singles chronology
"Coming True" (2004)	"My Love Won't Let You Down" (2005)

Coming True is a Swedish English language single by Daniel Lindström, winner of the Swedish version of Idol in its first season in 2004. He sang the winning song when he was declared winner on 26 November 2004. The single went straight to #1 on the Swedish Single Charts on 9 December 2004 and stayed at number for 7 weeks (9, 16, 23, 30 December 2004 and 6, 13 and 20 January 2005) making it both the Swedish Christmas and the New Year number one.

The song is written by Jörgen Elofsson specifically for the Idol 2004 winner. It was sung in the final by both Daniel Lindström and runner-up Darin Zanyar. The song is included in Daniel Lindström self-titled album Daniel Lindström.

== Charts ==
=== Weekly charts ===
Chart (2004–05)	Peak position
Sweden (Sverigetopplistan)	1

=== Year-end charts ===
Chart (2004)	Position
Sweden (Sverigetopplistan)	1
Chart (2005)	Position
Sweden (Sverigetopplistan)	49
