= Frans Michael Franzén =

Swedish-Finnish poet and clergyman (1772–1847)

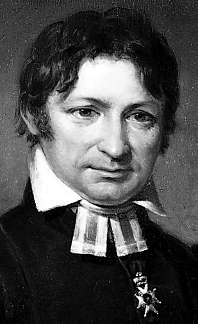
- Painting by Johan Gustaf Sandberg (1823)
- Diocese: Diocese of Härnösand
- In office: 1832–1847
- Predecessor: Erik Abraham Almqvist
- Successor: Israel Bergman

Orders
- Ordination: 1803

Personal details
- Born: 9 February 1772 Oulu, Sweden
- Died: 14 August 1847 (aged 75) Härnösand, Sweden

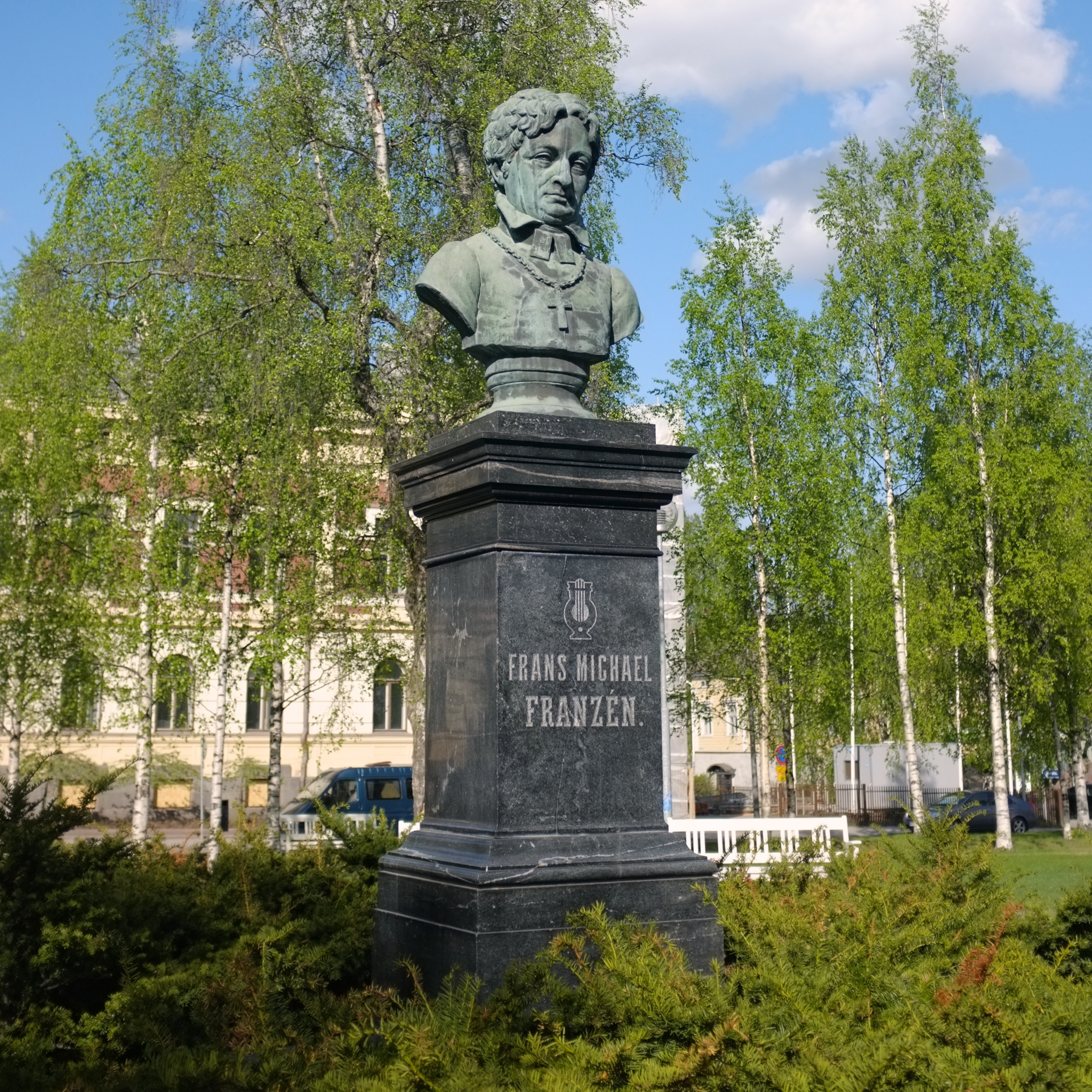
Statue of Frans Michael Franzén by Erland Stenberg (1879) at Franzéninpuisto park in Oulu, Finland

Frans Michael Franzén (9 February 1772 – 14 August 1847) was a Swedish-Finnish poet and clergyman. He served as the Bishop of the Diocese of Härnösand.

== Biography ==
Franzén was born in Oulu (Swedish: Uleåborg), Northern Ostrobothnia, Sweden (now part of Finland). At thirteen he entered the Royal Academy of Turku, where he attended the lectures of Henrik Gabriel Porthan (1739–1804), a pioneer in the study of Finnish history and folklore. He graduated in 1789, and became eloquentiae docens in 1792.

Three years later he started on a tour through Denmark, Germany, France and England, returning in 1796 to accept the office of university librarian at Turku in Finland. In 1801 he became professor of history and ethics, in 1808 he was elected a member of the Swedish Academy and in 1815 a member of the Royal Swedish Academy of Sciences. He was a member of Pro Fide et Christianismo, a Christian education society.

Finland was ceded by Sweden to Russia in 1809 after the Finnish War, and Franzén relocated to Kumla, Sweden, where he was appointed parish priest in the diocese of Strängnäs (1810), minister of the Klara Church in Stockholm (1824) and Bishop of Härnösand (1831). In Härnösand, he got to know Carl Olof Rosenius, seeing him as a promising preacher. Revivalist preacher Pehr Brandell worked as Franzén's assistant and after his death was defended by Franzén.

Franzén died in 1847 in Härnösand, Sweden.

== Personal life ==
Franzén was married three times; in 1799 to Margareta Elisabet Roos, in 1807 to Sophia Christina Wester, in 1831 to Christina Elisabeth Arvedsson. Franzén's son-in-law poet and historian Anders Abraham Grafström (1790–1870) served alongside him in the Swedish Academy and was Franzén's biographer. Franzén died in the parish of Säbrå in Västernorrland.

== Works ==
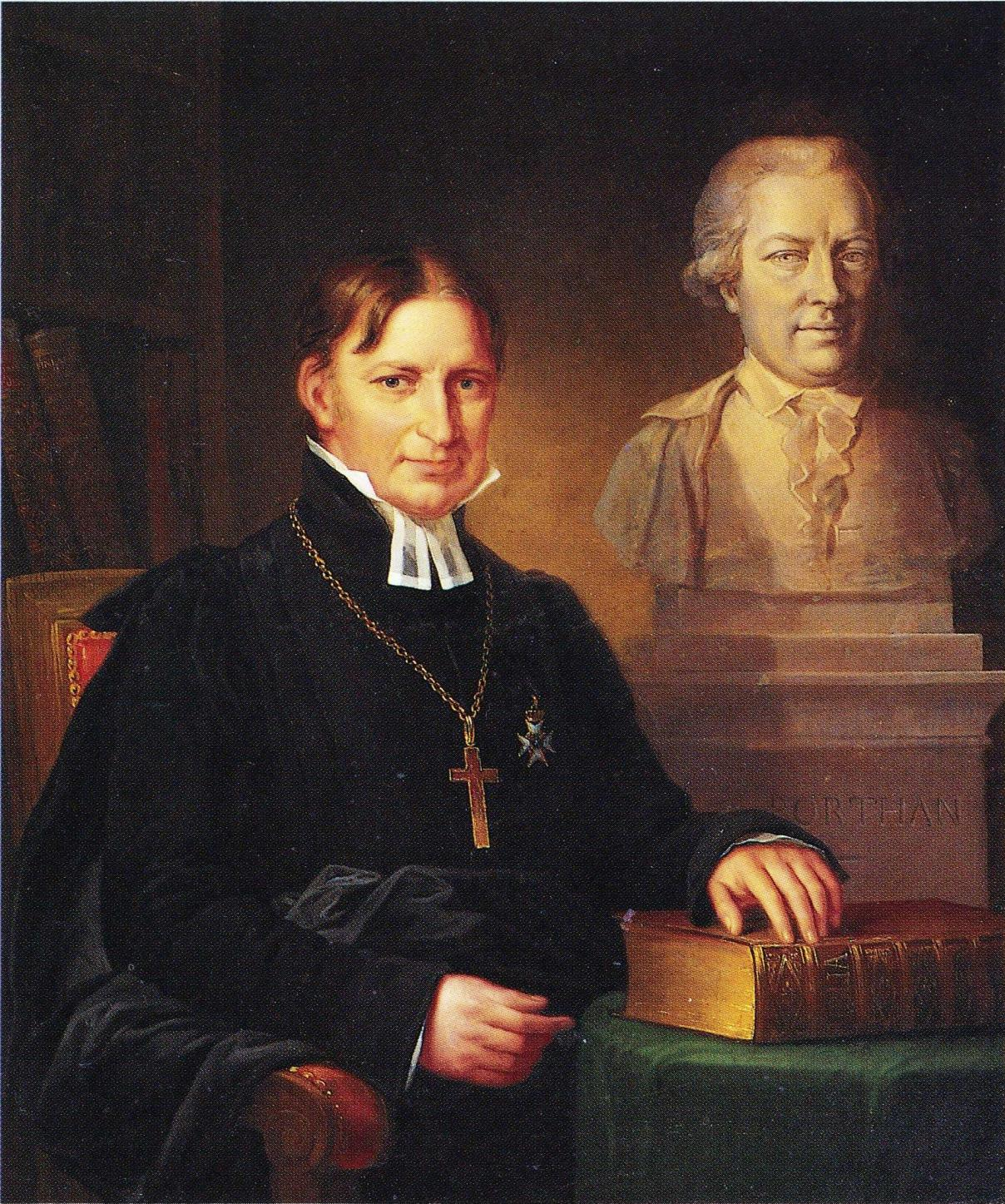
Portrait of F. M. Franzén by Fredric Westin

From the autumn of 1793, when his Till en ung Flicka and Menniskans anlete were inserted by Kellgren in the Stockholmspost, Franzén grew in popular favour by means of many minor poems of singular simplicity and truth, such as Till Selma, Den gamle knekten, Riddar St Göran, De Små blommorna, Modren vid vaggan, Nyårsmorgonen and Stjernhimmelen. His songs Goda gasse glaset töm, Sörj ej den gryende dagen förut, Champagnevinet and Beväringssång were widely sung, and in 1797 he won the prize of the Swedish Academy by his Sång öfver grefve Filip Creutz.

After 1797, his muse, touched with the academic spirit, grew more reflective and didactic. His longer works, as Emili eller en afton i Lappland, and the epics Svante Sture eller mötet vid Alvastra, Kolumbus eller Amerikas upptäckt and Gustaf Adolf i Tyskland (the last two incomplete), though rich in beauties of detail, are far inferior to his shorter pieces.

== Editions ==
The poetical works of Franzén are collected under the title Skaldestycken (7 vols., 1824–1861); new ed., Samlade dikter, with a biography by A. A. Grafström (1867–1869); also a selection (Valda dikter) in 2 vols. (1871). His prose writings, Om svenska drostniningar (Åbo, 1798; Örebro, 1823), Skrifter i obunden stil, vol. i. (1835), Predikningar (5 vols., 1841–1845) and Minnesteckningar, prepared for the Academy (3 vols., 1848–1860), are marked by faithful portraiture and purity of style.

== See also ==
- Statue of Frans Michael Franzén

Cultural offices
Preceded by Gustaf Fredrik Gyllenborg	Swedish Academy; Seat No.13; 1808–1847	Succeeded by Bernhard Elis Malmström
