= Wake Up Dreaming =

Studio album by Jacky Cheung
- Released: December 22, 2014
- Recorded: 2013–2014
- Studios: iMusic Workshop; Wong Chuk Hang (Hong Kong); Sterling Studio (New York City); Abbey Road Studios; Studio-A (London); Jiu Zi Tian Cheng Studio; China Conservatory of Music Studio (Beijing); Peter Mixman Studio (Kuala Lumpur)
- Genre: Mandopop
- Length: 39:38
- Label: Universal Music
- Producer: Andrew Tuason

Jacky Cheung chronology
Private Corner (2010)	Wake Up Dreaming (2014)

Singles from Wake Up Dreaming
- 1. "The Rest of Time" Released: October 27, 2014; 2. "Tears of Time" Released: December 3, 2014; 3. "You Said it" Released: December 21, 2014

Wake Up Dreaming is a Mandarin studio album by Hong Kong singer Jacky Cheung. It was released on December 22, 2014.

== Background and release ==
The album was recorded at Abbey Road Studios in London in August 2014, with Cheung being the first Mandopop singer to produce music at Abbey Road. Wake Up Dreaming sold over 10,000 on its first day of release in China and was the most popular album in 2014.

== Track listing ==
All songs produced by Jacky Cheung and Andrew Tuason. All music arranged by Tuason unless otherwise noted.

No.	Title	Lyrics	Music	Arranged by	Length
1.	"To Love in the Rest of Life 用餘生去愛" (from McBeth – Rest of Time)	Albert Leung	Samuel Jean; McAyla Beatley; Catherine Martin; Scott Effman; Lukas Nathanson		4:14
2.	"Tears Of Time 時間有淚"	Keith Chan Siu-kei	Ethan Su	Johnny Yim	3:37
3.	"You said it 你說的"	Xiao An	Xiao An		4:38
4.	"Fall In Love With You 我愛上你"	Keith Chan Siu-kei	Frederik Cornelis; Elisa Smekens		3:20
5.	"I Just Want To Sing 我只想唱歌"	Riley Lam	Xiao An		3:16
6.	"The Accused 控訴"	Xiao An	Xiao An		4:37
7.	"Wake Up Dreaming 我醒著做夢"	Albert Leung	Harry Mikael Sommerdahl; Jasmine Baird		4:03
8.	"It's Not Too Late 來得及"	Abrahim Chan	Lindy Robbins; Toby Gad; David Archuleta		3:43
9.	"Vain Ease 白自在"	Riley Lam	Amir Masoh		3:38
10.	"Not bad 不錯"	Keith Chan Siu-kei	Lindy Robbins; Marco Marinangeli; Jeffrey B. Franze	Anthony Chue	4:01
