= Wing on Wing =

2004 composition by Esa-Pekka Salonen

Wing on Wing is a single-movement composition for two sopranos and orchestra by the Finnish composer Esa-Pekka Salonen. The work was commissioned by the Los Angeles Philharmonic for their inaugural season at the Walt Disney Concert Hall and was premiered June 5, 2004, by the orchestra under Salonen. The piece is dedicated to the architect Frank Gehry, the acoustician Yasuhisa Toyota, and the L.A. Philharmonic CEO Deborah Borda.

== Composition ==
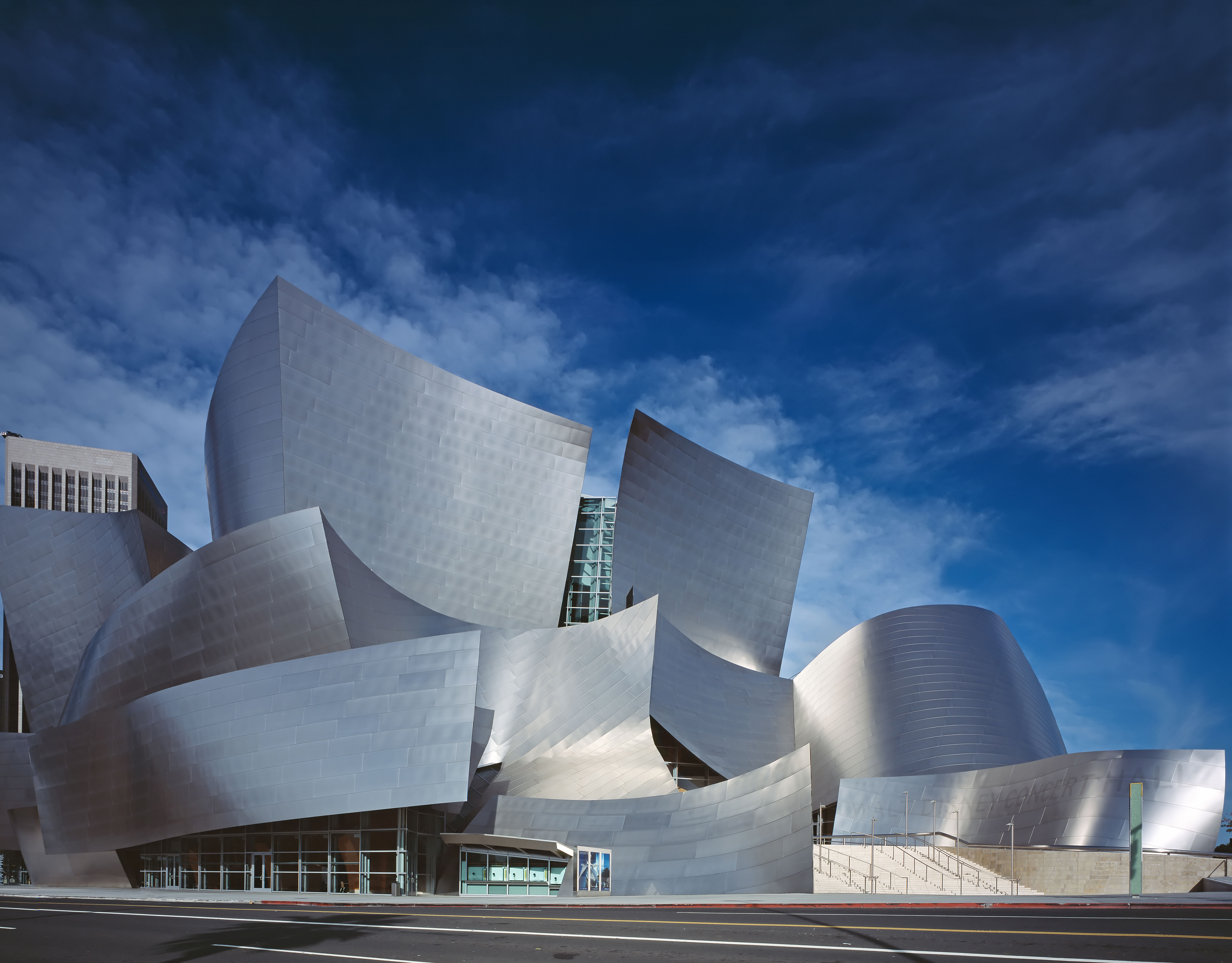
Wing on Wing was inspired by the design of the Walt Disney Concert Hall by the architect Frank Gehry.

Wing on Wing has a duration of roughly 27 minutes and is composed in one continuous movement. The title and composition of the piece are inspired by the architecture of the Walt Disney Concert Hall, which architect Frank Gehry likened to the appearance of a sailboat with its foresail and mainsail opened to a 180-degree angle. Salonen commented on the composition in the score program notes, writing:

My composition Wing on Wing is, of course, not an attempt to translate architecture into music, which would be an impossible task anyway. Nor is it a musical portrait of Frank Gehry, but rather an homage to an extraordinary building by an extraordinary man. At the same time it celebrates the efforts of every man and woman whose dedication, skill, and faith made a fantastic vision into reality.

The music also incorporates the sounds of a plainfin midshipman and the sampled voice of Frank Gehry.

=== Instrumentation ===
Wing on Wing is scored for two sopranos and an orchestra comprising four flutes (3rd doubling alto flute, 2nd doubling piccolo, 1st doubling piccolo 2 and bass flute), three oboes, cor anglais, three clarinets (3rd doubling E-flat clarinet and bass clarinet), contrabass clarinet, four French horns, four trumpets, three trombones, tuba, timpani, four percussionists, two harps, celesta, sampler, and strings.

The first percussionist plays glockenspiel, vibraphone, 3 large suspended cymbals and 4 bongos. The second plays crotales, almglocken, 8 bell plates, 4 tuned gongs and second glockenspiel. The third plays sandpaper blocks, 3 tam-tams, 4 large triangle (instrument)s, 2 congas, wind machine and third glockenspiel. The fourth plays chimes, another 15 tuned gongs, 2 suspended cymbals, sizzle cymbal and log drum.

== Reception ==
Mark Swed of the Los Angeles Times called Wing on Wing a "seductive, restless ode to Walt Disney Concert Hall and to the [Los Angeles Philharmonic]". Alex Ross of The New Yorker said it "meditates mesmerizingly on the architectural ideas of Frank Gehry, assembling high-tech orchestral-electronic textures that gleam and shimmer like the wings of Disney Hall." Stephen Johnson of BBC Music Magazine similarly lauded, "...while the sampled voice of Disney Hall architect Frank Gehry introduces a distractingly conceptualist note in Wing on Wing, the sound of the two wordless sopranos weaving in and out of lush orchestral textures is unforgettable." Arnold Whittall of Gramophone wrote:

Understatement was clearly not an option, and Salonen's overblown hymn of praise aims to celebrate 'a fusion between instrument and body, nature and technology'. The voice of architect Frank Gehry is electronically treated to produce mysterious, oracular sounds, and a pair of wordless sopranos soar ecstatically above saturated post-Messiaen chorales, in tribute to the imagery of wings and sails which link Gehry's building to the nearby Pacific Ocean.
