= Daniel Lindström =

Swedish singer from Umeå (born 1978)

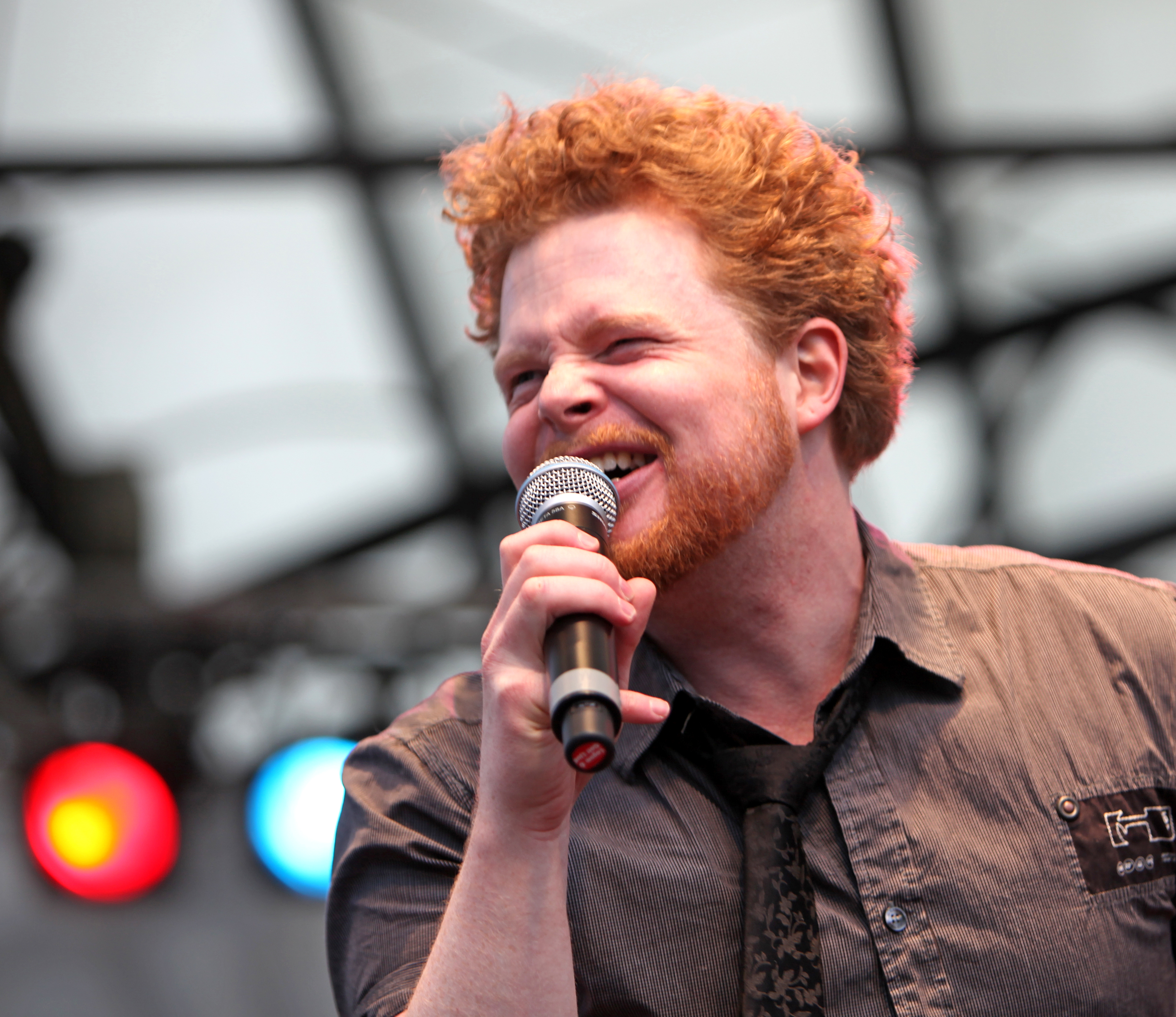
- Lindström in 2009.

Background information
- Born: Daniel Lindström; 30 January 1978 (age 48)
- Origin: Umeå, Sweden
- Genre: Pop
- Occupation: Singer
- Instrument: Singing
- Years active: 2004–present
- Labels: Sony BMG (2004–2007); LaLuff Records (2007–2009)
- Website: daniellindstrom.se

Daniel Lindström (born 30 January 1978) is a Swedish singer from Umeå who won the Swedish Idol 2004 contest against Darin Zanyar. His first single, "Coming True", sold double platinum, and his self-titled album, released in December 2004, topped the Swedish pop charts. The second album Nån slags verklighet (Some kind of reality) contains songs written in Swedish by the singer himself. His third album, D-Day, was released in January 2009. For a time, he lived with his wife and child in Solna, Sweden.

In October 2009, Lindström and other Idol contestants convened for a panel at CMJ in New York City, to discuss their experiences and the current state of music.

== Idol 2004 performances ==
- Semi-finals: Lately by Stevie Wonder
- Top 11: Fast love by George Michael
- Top 10: Crazy by Seal
- Top 9: If You Don't Know Me By Now by Harold Melvin & the Blue Notes
- Top 8: Sarah by Mauro Scocco
- Top 7: That's The Way It Is by Celine Dion
- Top 6: "Fly Me to the Moon" by Frank Sinatra
- Top 5: License To Kill by Gladys Knight
- Top 4: September by Earth, Wind & Fire
- Top 4: Just The Way You Are by Billy Joel
- Top 3: Lately by Stevie Wonder
- Top 3: Glorious by Andreas Johnson
- Grand Final: Coming True written by Jörgen Elofsson (Winning Song)
- Grand Final: Virtual Insanity by Jamiroquai
- Grand Final: Sarah by Mauro Scocco

== Discography ==
Daniel Lindström discography
- Studio albums: 3
- Singles: 7
- Music videos: 5
- B-sides: 4
- Tours: 2

The following is a complete discography of every album and single released by Swedish Pop music artist Daniel Lindström.

=== Studio albums ===
Year	Information	Sweden	Sales and Certifications
2004	Daniel Lindström: First studio album; Released: 9 December 2004; Label: Sony BMG; Format: CD	1	Swedish sales: 53,000 IFPI: Platinum
2006	Nån slags verklighet: Second studio album; Released: 16 August 2006; Label: Sony BMG; Format: CD	3	Swedish sales: 22,000 IFPI: Gold
2009	D-Day: Third studio album; Released: 29 January 2009; Label: LaLuff Records; Format: CD	25	Swedish sales: 3,000 IFPI: N/A

=== Singles ===
Year	Song	Sweden	Certification	Album
2004	"Coming True"	1	2xPlatinum (IFPI)	Daniel Lindström
2005	"My Love Won't Let You Down"	10	—	Daniel Lindström
2005	"Run"	—	—	Daniel Lindström
2006	"Nån slags verklighet"	26	—	Nån slags verklighet
2008	"Saturday Night"	—	—	D-Day
2008	"Caught in that Feeling"	—	—	D-Day
2012	"I Know Nothing"	—	—	Non-album single

== Personal life ==
Lindström was in a relationship with future Eurovision winner Loreen between 2004 and 2006. The couple shared an apartment in Södermalm. He dedicated his first album after winning Idol to Loreen.

Preceded by N/A	Idol winner Daniel Lindström (2004)	Succeeded by Agnes Carlsson
