= Lewis Pragasam =

Malaysian percussionist (1957–2023)

Background information
- Born: 10 August 1957; Kuala Lumpur, Federation of Malaya
- Died: 18 December 2023 (aged 66) Petaling Jaya, Selangor, Malaysia
- Genres: Malaysian jazz fusion
- Instrument: Drums
- Works: Asiabeat Project

Lewis Pragasam (10 August 1957 – 18 December 2023) was a Malaysian percussionist and drummer recognized for his contributions to Malaysian jazz fusion music. He was the founder of the progressive Jazz fusion band Asiabeat in 1979. The group achieved international fame by blending Asian ethnic rhythms and western jazz.

== Early life ==
Pragasam was born on 10 August 1957 in Brickfields, Kuala Lumpur. His father was of Indian origin while his mother was from Rangoon in then Burma. He did not have formal music training, but, in his later years, he was a student of Indian mridangam player Karaikudi Mani. Growing up in Brickfields, he was exposed to a melting pot of ethnicities and cultures. He would later attribute some of his works to the early exposure that he had to Indian Hindu temple drummers, Chinese drummers preparing for the dragon dances, and the Buddhist monks in the monasteries.

== Career ==
=== The Revolvers and jazz fusion ===
In 1976, Pragasam joined the Revolvers, a Kuala Lumpur band, starting out as a drummer. His transition to jazz fusion was driven by his admiration for American jazz percussionist Billy Cobham, who was then playing with John McLaughlin's Mahavishnu Orchestra. This shift laid the foundation for his future endeavors in the fusion of Asian and Western music. In 1977, Pragasam also helped organize the first jazz rock concert in Malaysia at the University of Malaya.

=== Asiabeat ===
Pragasam founded the progressive Jazz fusion band Asiabeat in 1979. The band gained recognition for its cosmic progressive, all-percussion style, fusing Asian ethnic rhythms with Western jazz. The group released a self-titled album, The Asiabeat Project in 1983, and followed it up with Dare to Dream (1984), Spirit Of The People (1991) Drumusique (1993), Monsoon (1994), Urban Beyond (2007) and Akar (2021).

=== Collaborations and advertising ===
Pragasam's influence extended globally through collaborations with world-renowned artists such as Bob James, Nathan East, and John Kaizan Neptune. His performances at major international festivals included a royal command performance for the then Prince Charles in Edinburgh in 1995. He traveled to the United States on a Fulbright scholarship in the early 1990s, where he studied Southeast Asian and World music. During this time, he served as the artist-in-residence at East Carolina University in Greenville, North Carolina.

Pragasam also composed music for advertising jingles including the Petronas Deepavali commercials titled Duelling Massuers. The campaign ran between 1996 and 1999 and won awards including one at the Asian Advertising Awards.

=== Educational contributions ===
In the mid-1990s, Pragasam founded the Groove School and contributed to the awareness of percussion and drum culture in Malaysia. He also served as the music director at Malaysia's Centre of Performing Arts at Help Institute. He also delivered a series of lectures called "Drum Talk" giving lessons on percussion.

== Death ==
Pragasam died on 18 December 2023 in Petaling Jaya. He was 66. He was performing along to "Joy to the World" at a Christmas concert when he collapsed from a heart attack.

== Selected discography ==
=== Asiabeat ===
- Asiabeat Project (1983)
- Dare to Dream (1984)
- Spirit of the People (1991)
- Drumusique (1993)
- Monsoon (1994)
- Urban Beyond (2007)
- Akar (2021)

=== Other acts ===
- Book of the Key (2004)
- Asianergy (2005)
- East West Connection (2022)

== Published works ==
- Pragasam, Lewis (2019). Ethnic Malaysian Drum Grooves. Dynamic Publication. ISMN 9790902110211.
- Pragasam, Lewis (2018). An Introduction To Drum Grooves. Dynamic Publication. ISMN 9790902110204.
- Pragasam, Lewis (2006). Drum-Talk, Volume 2: Fundamental Rhythm Studies for Drums. Mel Bay Publications. ISBN 9780786660018.
- Pragasam, Lewis (2006). Drum-talk Volume 1: Fundamental Rhythm Studies for Drums. Mel Bay Publications. ISBN 978-0786660001.
