= Sam Concepcion discography =

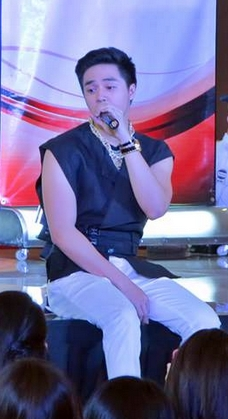
- Concepcion performing at the Infinite album launch in 2013.
- Studio albums: 3
- EPs: 2
- Singles: 50
- Music videos: 20
- Other appearances: 7

Filipino singer and actor Sam Concepcion has released three studio albums, two extended plays and thirteen singles.

== Albums ==
=== Studio albums ===
Title	Album details	Certifications (sales thresholds)
Sam Concepcion	Released: September 2007; Label: Universal; Formats: CD, digital download	PARI: Gold; PHI: 10,000
Infinite	Released: August 10, 2013; Label: Universal; Formats: CD, digital download	PARI: Gold; PHI: 7,500
Bago	Released: March 4, 2016; Label: Universal; Formats: CD, digital download	

=== Extended plays ===
Title	Album details
I'll Find Your Heart (Music+Videos)	Released: 2008; Label: Universal; Formats: CD, digital download
Forever Young	Released: September 2011; Label: Universal; Formats: CD, digital download

=== Video albums ===
Title	Album details
Pop Class	Released: March 3, 2010; Label: Universal; Formats: CD, digital download

== Singles ==
Title	Year	Chart positions		Certifications	Album
Title	Year	PHI Catalog	PHL Songs	Certifications	Album
"Even If"	2007	—			Sam Concepcion
"Happy"	2007	—			Sam Concepcion
"I'll Find Your Heart"	2007	—			Sam Concepcion
"Stay the Same"	2007				Sam Concepcion
"Hanggang Tingin"	2007				Sam Concepcion
"Wishing You'll Be Mine"	2007				Sam Concepcion
"Kay Dali"	2007				Sam Concepcion
"Paano Na"	2007				Sam Concepcion
"Walang Hanggan"	2007				Sam Concepcion
"Da Doo Ron Ron"	2007				Sam Concepcion
"Come Everybody"	2007				Sam Concepcion
"Missed You"	2011	—			Forever Young - EP
"Forever Young"	2011	—			Forever Young - EP
"Hala Heyla Hey"	2011				Forever Young - EP
"Dream On"	2011				Forever Young - EP
"Be My Girlfriend"	2011				Forever Young - EP
"Someone"	2011				Forever Young - EP
"Kontrabida"	2012	—			Philpop 2012: The Fourteen Finalists / Infinite
"No Limitations"	2013	—			Infinite
"I'm the One"	2013				Infinite
"She Drives Me Crazy"	2013				Infinite
"Di Ka Nag-iisa"	2013				Infinite
"Rescue You"	2013				Infinite
"There's No Me - Without You"	2013				Infinite
"Love, Love Love"	2013				Infinite
"Panalangin"	2013				Infinite
"Myphone Jingle"	2013				Infinite
"Mahal na Mahal"	2013	2		PARI: Platinum	Infinite
"Dati" (with Tippy Dos Santos featuring Quest)	2013	—		PARI: 2× Platinum	Philpop 2013: Your Theme. Your Genre. Your Song.
"ITO ANG LIGA"	2014				Non-album single
"Teka Break" (featuring Coach Jungee)	2016	—			Bago
"1sang Daan"	2016	—			Bago
"Kalsada"	2016	—			Bago
"Di Mo Ba Alam"	2016				Bago
"Bago"	2016				Bago
"Trying"	2016				Bago
"Easy to Love"	2016				Bago
"Afterglow" (aka Skyze) (with Moophs)	2016	—			Non-album singles
"Bukas Makalawa"	2018				Non-album singles
"Maybe the Night"	2018				Non-album singles
"Bibingka"	2018				Non-album singles
"Ikot-Ikot"	2019				Non-album singles
"Loved You Better"	2020	—			Non-album singles
"Reload (ft. Christian Kuya)"	2020	—			Non-album singles
"RISE"	2020	—			Non-album singles
"Thrill Of It"	2020	—			Non-album singles
"Nonstop"	2021	—			Non-album singles
"Diwata (from Miss Universe Philippines 2021)"	2021	—	4		Non-album singles
"Dalisay (from Miss Universe Philippines 2022)"	2022	—			Non-album singles
"Ikaw Ang"	2022	—			Non-album singles
"—" denotes a recording that did not chart or was released before Billboard Philippines era.

== Guest appearances ==
Title	Year	Other artist(s)	Album
"Mama"	2008	—	Kris Aquino: The Greatest Love
"Pilipinas, Tara Na!" (remake of "Biyahe Tayo")	2011	Various Artists	Single-only release
"Rescue You"	2012	Christian Bautista	First Class: Outbound Expanded Edition
"Di Ka Nag-iisa"	2015	Runmanila, Dello	Runmanila
"On Top"	2017	James Reid, King WAW	Palm Dreams
"Misfits"	2017	Kiana Valenciano	Single-only release
"Para Sa'yo"	2022	Shanaia Gomez	Single-only release
