= No Limitations (song) =

Single by Sam Concepcion

from the album Infinite
- Released: May 23, 2013
- Recorded: 2013
- Genre: RnB, synthpop
- Length: 3:53
- Label: Universal Records
- Songwriter: Billy Crawford

Sam Concepcion singles chronology
"Forever Young" (2012)	"No Limitations" (2013)	"Mahal na Mahal" (2013)

"No Limitations" is a song recorded by Filipino singer Sam Concepcion for his second studio album Infinite (2013). It was written by international Filipino artist, Billy Crawford; and is under Universal Records. "No Limitations'" musical composition, as well as Concepcion's vocals and versatility, positively surprised critics. It was made available digitally through iTunes and MyMusicStore, where it charted at number one for five consecutive weeks, on May 23, 2013.

== Composition ==
"No Limitations" is an upbeat tune composed by international Filipino singer Billy Crawford. In an interview with Philippine Entertainment Portal, Concepcion stated, "I am overwhelmed that Billy actually composed this track for me[...]Working alongside with him in the studio just opened up a whole new side of me I thought was never there. Billy (Crawford) really made sure the work was perfection". He also added, "He really did a fantastic job producing this track for me[...] he worked many hours just to get the right effects and mix." The song is produced by Kris Lawrence and Marcus Davis. "I enjoyed working on this song because I was guided by some of the most gifted artists in the country," says Concepcion.

== Promotion ==
Concepcion performed it for the first time at ABS-CBN's Sunday show, ASAP 18 on August 4, 2013, in line with his album launch at Robinsons Magnolia on August 10, 2013. According to the hosts, Concepcion showed his versatility as a singer and at the same time a dancer. On August 7, 2013, Concepcion performed the single at ABS-CBN's morning show, Umagang Kay Ganda and on the next day at GMA Network's The Ryzza Mae Show.

== Music video ==
The music video of "No Limitations" premiered on MYX Philippines on August 4, 2013. It was directed by Jake Soriano, and features a futuristic themes in vivid black. Concepcion wears a black leather suit which emphasizes his biceps revealing a hunkier Sam was produced to complement the track. According to Rappler, he has evolved into a more mature performer and has improved physically too. Concepcion says he took working out seriously so that many will not associate him anymore as the little boy who won the Little Big Star title in 2006. "That was 7 years ago. I was 13 years old then and now I’m 20[...]I need to mature physically as my career goes in a new direction" he says. He also added, "I feel that many like this new image. I’m just a hunkier Sam Concepcion now". The video also features GMA Network's actress and model, Solenn Heussaff. According to Concepcion, "It's been a fantasy[...]dream for me to have Solenn in this music video. Her presence certainly brought the word 'sexy' in this. I'm glad she was allowed to crossover for this one".
