= Infinite (Sam Concepcion album) =

Studio album by Sam Concepcion
- Released: August 10, 2013
- Recorded: 2012–2013
- Genre: Pop
- Label: Universal

Sam Concepcion chronology
| Forever Young (2011) | Infinite (2013) |

Singles from Infinite
- 1. "No Limitations" Released: May 23, 2012; 2. "Mahal na Mahal" Released: January 29, 2013

Infinite is the second studio album by Filipino singer Sam Concepcion. It was released on August 10, 2013 under Universal Records. The album celebrates Concepcion's 10 years in the music industry. The first single, "No Limitations" composed by international artist Billy Crawford was released on May 23, 2013 at iTunes and MyMusicStore by which it became number one for five weeks in a row. The music video was released on August 4, 2013 via YouTube which features a futuristic theme and a special participation by actress, Solenn Heussaff. The second single, "Mahal na Mahal" was released on July 29, 2013.

== Background and release ==
On early 2013, Concepcion uploaded a blurred photo through his Instagram account regarding the setlist of his yet unknown album. On an interview with ABS-CBN, he stated, "It’s totally different from the way I used to sound. It’s a new sound and a new look for me as a recording artist. That’s one thing that my fans can look forward to." He also added,"It's going to be new music for me, something that you haven't heard me do." He added that the shift in image is also a way to "graduate" from his being identified with the popular kiddie talent search Little Big Star which he won in 2005. It was years 2012 through 2013 that he recorded most of the tracks featured on the album. Concepcion is thankful that he was given the chance to collaborate with the biggest names in the country's recording scene which includes Billy Crawford, Christian Bautista, Jay-R, among others. According to him, "The album is a preview of the many things I do as a performer. In this album, you'll see me dabble in different genres". It will be released on August 10, 2013 in celebration of his 10th anniversary in the Philippines' music industry.

== Composition ==
""I am overwhelmed that Billy actually composed this track for me ...'No Limitations.' Working alongside him in the studio just opened up a whole new side of me I thought was never there. Billy (Crawford) really made sure the work was perfection. He really did a fantastic job producing this track for me[...] he worked many hours just to get the right effects and mix"

—Sam Concepcion, via Philippine Entertainment Portal.

The album's carrier single "No Limitations" is an upbeat tune composed by international Filipino singer Billy Crawford. The song "Love, Love, Love" is a cover that was originally sung by international singer Christian Bautista. Bautista worked closely with Concepcion for years as both of them were discovered by STAGES and they both worked with the musical "The Lion, The Witch, and The Wardrobe" in 2003. A solo version of "Rescue You", which was previously recorded as a duet with Bautista, is also included in the album. GMA Network Jay-R also collaborated with the singer in R&B track, "I'm The One". Singapore-based composer Tat Tong contributed "There's No Me" (Without You). Concepcion also collaborated with rock-band Runmanila for the song, "Di Ka Nag-iisa". The album also includes bonus tracks "Panalangin", which was a soundtrack from the movie I Do Bidoo Bidoo: Heto nAPO Sila!, and "Kontrabida", a song entry from the 2012 Philpop which Concepcion interpreted that eventually finished in third place. Other songs included in the album are "She Drives Me Crazy" and "Mahal Na Mahal", originally sung by Archie Dairocas.

== Promotion ==
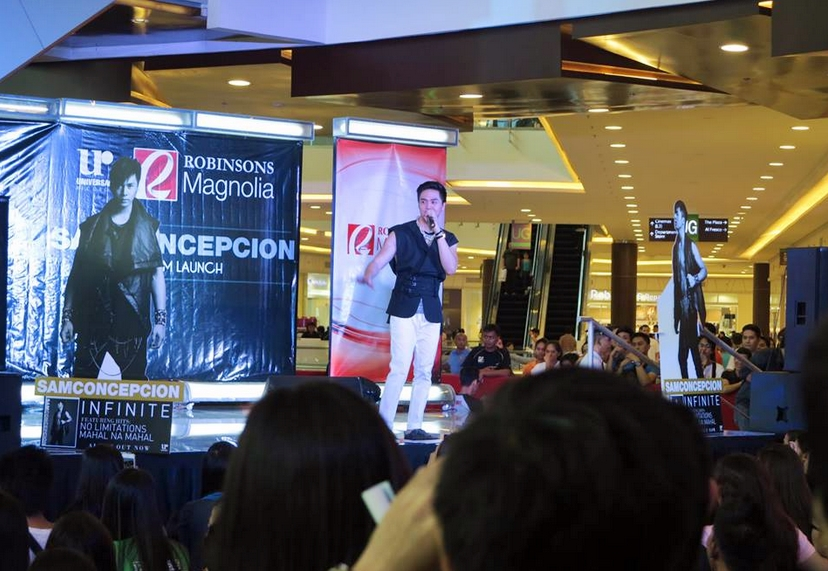
Concepcion performing at Robinsons Magnolia during the Infinite album launch.

Concepcion released the first single "No Limitations" on May 23, 2013 through digital download via Apple iTunes and MyMusicStore. It eventually became number 1 for five weeks in a row in My Music Store Weekly chart. Concepcion performed it for the first time at ABS-CBN's Sunday show, ASAP 18 on August 4, 2013 wearing a black leather suit he wears on the music video and on other promotional photos. According to the hosts, Concepcion showed his versatility as a singer and at the same time a dancer. On August 7, 2013 Concepcion performed the carrier single at ABS-CBN's morning news, Umagang Kayganda and on the next day at GMA Network's The Ryzza Mae Show. The album was launched at Robinsons Magnolia in Quezon City on August 10, 2013; wearing a black leather top and white tight jeans, Concepcion performs his tracks in front of the fans. Astroplus, the official partner of the launch posted a status on Twitter greeting Concepcion for a sold-out album launch.

== Track listing ==
CD
| No. | Title | Lyrics | Length |
|---|---|---|---|
| 1. | "No Limitations" | Billy Crawford | 3:53 |
| 2. | "Love, Love, Love" (Originally sung by Christian Bautista) | Christian Bautista | 3:39 |
| 3. | "Rescue You" (Originally sung by Christian Bautista) | Christian Bautista | 3:57 |
| 4. | "I'm the One" | Jay-R | 4:39 |
| 5. | "There's No Me (Without You)" | Tat Tong | 3:16 |
| 6. | "Di Ka Nag-iisa" (Duet with RunManila) | Jessen Ocbina | 3:50 |
| 7. | "She Drives Me Crazy" | Fine Young Cannibals | 3:45 |
| 8. | "Mahal na Mahal" (Originally sung by Archie D.) | Archie Dairocas | 4:36 |
| 9. | "Panalangin" (excerpt from the movie, I Do Bidoo Bidoo: Heto nAPO Sila!) | Jim Paredes | 3:26 |
| 10. | "Kontrabida" (from 2012 PhilPop) | Soc Villanueva | 4:13 |
