= Heherson Alvarez =

Filipino politician (1939–2020)

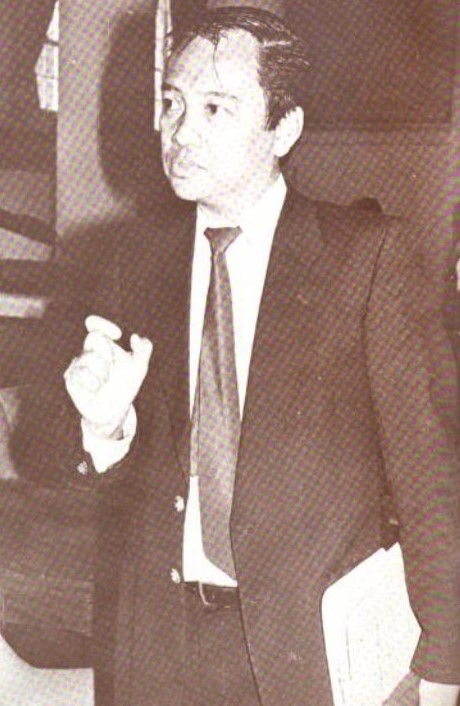
- Alvarez as a senator, photograph released by the Philippine Congress, c. 1988

Commissioner of the Climate Change Commission
- In office October 23, 2009 – June 30, 2016

Secretary of Environment and Natural Resources
- In office March 29, 2001 – December 13, 2002
- Preceded by: Antonio Cerilles
- Succeeded by: Elisea G. Gozun

Member of the Philippine House of Representatives from Isabela's 4th District
- In office June 30, 1998 – March 29, 2001
- Preceded by: Antonio M. Abaya
- Succeeded by: Antonio M. Abaya

Senator of the Philippines
- In office June 30, 1987 – June 30, 1998

Secretary of Agrarian Reform
- In office February 7, 1987 – March 7, 1987
- Preceded by: Position established
- Succeeded by: Philip Ella Juico

Minister of Agrarian Reform
- In office May 1, 1986 – February 7, 1987
- Preceded by: Conrado F. Estrella
- Succeeded by: Position abolished

Personal details
- Born: Heherson Turingan Alvarez; October 26, 1939 Santiago, Isabela, Philippine Commonwealth
- Died: April 20, 2020 (aged 80) Manila, Philippines
- Party: PDP–Laban (1986–1987; 2018–2020)
- Other political affiliations: Lakas (1998–2004); LDP (1988–1998; 2004–2018); UNIDO (1987–1988)
- Spouse: Cecile Guidote-Alvarez
- Children: 2
- Education: University of the Philippines (BA); Harvard University (MPA)
- Profession: Politician
- Website: http://www.hehersonalvarez.com/

Heherson "Sonny" Turingan Alvarez (October 26, 1939 – April 20, 2020) was a politician from the Philippines. He served as a member of the House of Representatives and the Senate of the Philippines. He was also Minister (then Secretary) of Agrarian Reform from 1986 to 1987 and Secretary of Environment and Natural Resources from 2001 to 2002.

== Education ==
Sonny Alvarez studied liberal arts at the University of the Philippines. He also earned a master's degree in Economics and Public Administration from Harvard University.

While in UP, Sonny Alvarez became a member of the Alpha Phi Beta Fraternity and would eventually become its Lord Chancellor in 1960. He was a champion debater and had captained the UP, and later the Philippine Debate team in several successful tours in Australia and the United States. His team brought home the Wilmot Cup from Australia.

== Career ==
=== 1971 constitutional convention ===
Alvarez was a young activist who participated in the 1971 constitutional convention. He refused to sign the Ferdinand Marcos regime backed constitution that gave extensions to the president's term in office.

=== Escape from the dictatorship ===
On the day when Ferdinand Marcos suddenly imposed martial, Alvarez had been at the University of the Philippines Diliman attending a public forum with Senator Benigno “Ninoy” Aquino Jr. When his girlfriend Cecile Guidote told him that she had work to finish and could not join him for their planned dinner, he decided to stay overnight at his ConCon office to work on a speech. As a result, he was able to evade Marcos' soldiers who had succeeded in arresting most of the oppositionist ConCon delegates, including Aquino.

He went into hiding in various places for a while, but the oppositionists soon suggested that he go to the US to help gather support for their resistance against Marcos, working with Senator Raul Manglapus who had likewise escaped capture because he was overseas on a speaking engagement when martial law was declared.

With assistance from Fr. James Reuter, Alvarez and Guidote were married in a secret "Matrimonia concencia" ceremony in Cavite, with the records sealed in the church's vaults. Then with assistance from UNESCO Philippines chair Dr. Alejandro Roces, he secretly got onboard a greek ship which took him to Hong Kong, and from there, he went on to the US. His wife Cecile, founder of the Philippine Educational Theater Association managed to follow him eventually, managing to get through immigration with little more than a theater prop for a passport.

=== Exile during martial law ===
While in exile, he was one of the organizers of the Movement for a Free Philippines, which did what it could to bring the dictatorship to an end. When Ninoy Aquino was assassinated in 1983, Alvarez organized the Ninoy Aquino Movement, which lobbied for the US Government to stop supporting Marcos, despite the latter's closeness to Ronald Reagan.

While in exile, the Alvarezes had two children, Hexilon and Herxilia, which were plays on the word "exile" - a reminder of who they were and that they were meant to return to the Philippines one day.

=== Death of Marsman Alvarez ===
One major consequence of Alvarez' work against the regime, however, was the murder of his brother Marsman Alvarez at the hands of Marcos' intelligence agents. Marsman was accosted by armed men later identified as intelligence agents in June 1974, and his mutilated body was discovered the day after. Marsman body had a bloated face, a displaced jaw, a slashed tongue, and stab wounds in the neck.

Their father, Capt. Marcelo Alvarez, who had begged Sonny to be more discreet in his opposition to Marcos, died of a heart attack after he learned of Marsman's death.

=== Return to the Philippines and government service ===
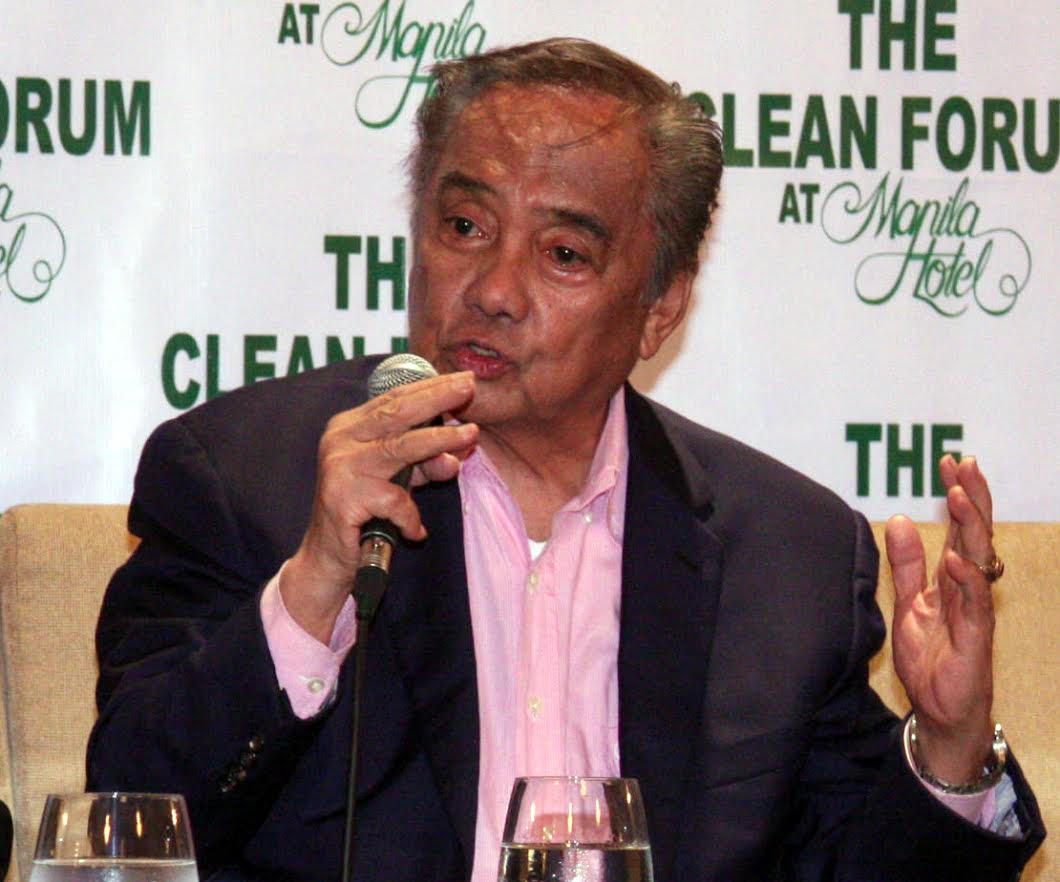
Alvarez speaking at a forum in Manila Hotel

Eventually, the Philippine leadership changed as Corazon Aquino, the wife of Benigno Aquino Jr., took power after the successful People Power Revolution.

He returned to the Philippines in 1986 to partake in rebuilding the government in the wake of collapse of the Marcos regime. He won a senatorial seat in the post-revolution government of President Corazon Aquino, serving two terms from 1987 to 1992 and 1992 to 1998. He later represented Isabela province's 4th district in the House of Representatives from 1998 to 2001. In early 1994, Alvarez initiated the "Healthy Air Pact" among three oil companies (Pilipinas Shell, Caltex and Petron Corporation) for them to introduce unleaded gasoline to the Philippine market.

Senator Alvarez also held two cabinet positions - Secretary of Agrarian Reform (February 7, 1987 – March 7, 1987) and Secretary of Environment and Natural Resources (March 29, 2001 – December 13, 2002). He was known as staunch environmentalist as he was called "Mr. Environment" during his term as Environmental Secretary. Moreover, as a senator, he authored the resolution to make April 22 of every year as "Earth Day" in the Philippines. He is an advocate of using organic fertilizer and pesticides.

From 2009 to 2016, he served as commissioner and vice chair of the Climate Change Commission.

== Personal life ==
Alvarez married artist and activist Cecile Guidote; the couple had two children, Hexilon and Herxilla. Guidote is the better known host of radio drama anthology program Radyo Balintataw on DZRH.

== Death ==
Senator Alvarez and wife, Cecile contracted the COVID-19 during the COVID-19 pandemic in the Philippines sometime in March. They were both hospitalized. CNN reported that Heherson Alvarez underwent experimental plasma therapy treatment and blood plasma convalescent therapy. On April 20, 2020, Alvarez died in Manila due to complications from COVID-19.
