= One More Chance, The Musical =

2024 Philippine jukebox musical

One More Chance, The Musical featuring the songs of Ben&Ben
- Official poster
- Music: Paulo Benjamin Guico; Miguel Benjamin Guico; Tony Muñoz
- Lyrics: Paulo Benjamin Guico; Miguel Benjamin Guico; Tony Muñoz
- Book: Michelle Ngu-Nario
- Basis: Ben&Ben Discography
- Premiere: 12 April 2024: PETA Theater Center, New Manila, Quezon City

One More Chance, The Musical featuring the songs of Ben&Ben is a jukebox musical written by Michelle Ngu-Nario with the songs of the 9-piece indie folk-pop band, Ben&Ben. The musical is based on the 2007 film One More Chance directed by Cathy Garcia-Molina and written by Vanessa R. Valdez and Carmi Raymundo. This was produced by the Philippine Educational Theater Association as its 56th season-ender. The musical was directed by PETA's Artistic Director, Maribel Legarda and songs we're arranged by Myke Salomon.

The show premiered last April 12, 2024 at the PETA Theater Center in New Manila, Quezon City. Initially, the shows will run till June 16, however due to popular demand during its ticket sales, they've announced during their press night that it will run until June 30, 2024.

Last May 23, 2024, PETA did a Facebook live announcing a Three-Month Rerun of One More Chance, The Musical from August 22 to October 27, 2024. Days before the announcement, PETA have been teasing this by the show's famous idea of the "Three-Month Rule".

== Cast ==
| Characters | 2024 Original Run | | August-October 2024 Rerun | |
|---|---|---|---|---|
| Popoy | Sam Concepcion | CJ Navato | Sam Concepcion | CJ Navato |
| Basha | Anna Luna | Nicole Omillo | Anna Luna | Nicole Omillo |
| Tricia | Sheena Belarmino | Kiara Takahashi | Sheena Belarmino | Kiara Takahashi |
| Mark | Jay Gonzaga | Jef Flores | Jay Gonzaga | Jef Flores |
| Krizzy | Ada Tayao | Rica Laguardia | Ada Tayao | Rica Laguardia |
| Kenneth | Paji Arceo | Poppert Bernadas | Paji Arceo | Brent Valdez |
| Anj | Dippy Arceo | Via Antonio | Via Antonio | Miah Canton |
| JP | Jon Abella | Jon Abella | Jon Abella | Gio Gahol |
| Chinno | Johnnie Moran | Johnnie Moran | Johnnie Moran | Johnnie Moran |
| Edith | Hazel Maranan | Hazel Maranan | Hazel Maranan | Hazel Maranan |
| Bert/Tito Willie | Raul Montesa | Floyd Tena | Raul Montesa | Floyd Tena |
| Rose/Tita Elvie | Neomi Gonzales | Carla Guevara-Laforteza | Neomi Gonzales | Carla Guevara-Laforteza |
| Helen/Guia/Roselle | Chez Cuenca | Coleen Paz | Chez Cuenca | Coleen Paz |
| Mr. Tan/Francis | JC Galano | Matthew Barbers | JC Galano | Matthew Barbers |
| Ensemble | Mico Esquivel, Katreana Gamban | Mico Esquivel, Katreana Gamban | Mico Esquivel, Katreana Gamban, Kiki Baento | Mico Esquivel, Katreana Gamban, Kiki Baento |

== Musical Numbers ==
Act I

- "Araw-Araw/Dahilan" - Company
- "Maybe The Night" - Popoy and Basha
- "Nakikinig Ka Ba Sa Akin" - Popoy, Basha and Thursday Barkada
- "Ilang Tulog Na Lang" - Popoy and Basha
- "Magpahinga" - Basha and Rose
- "Mitsa" - Basha and Popoy
- "Masyado Pang Maaga" - Popoy
- "Dahilan" - Popoy, Basha and Company
- "Langyang Pag-Ibig" - Tricia, Popoy, Anj, Chinno, JP and Company
- "Upuan" - Popoy and Company
- "Elyu" - Popoy and Basha

Act II

- "Ride Home" - Company
- "Tricia's Song" - Tricia
- "Susi" † - Thursday Barkada
- "Kasayaw" - Tito Willie and Nanay Edith
- "Lifetime" - Ensemble
- "Pagtingin" - Popoy
- "Pagtingin" (Reprise) - JP, Basha and Kenneth
- "Doors/Pagtingin" - Basha, Tricia and Popoy
- "Sa Susunod Na Habang Buhay" - Basha and Popoy
- "Leaves" - Chinno, Popoy and Thursday Barkada
- "The Ones We Once Loved" - Basha and Popoy
- "Tricia's Song" (Reprise) - Popoy and Tricia
- "Kathang Isip" - Tricia
- "Sugat" - Thursday Barkada and Company
- "Araw-Araw/Dahilan" (Reprise) - Popoy, Basha and Company

†Song was originally included but was cut on the musical on the latter shows.

"Bibingka" was also included but was used as a background music in the wedding scene.
