= Cecile Guidote-Alvarez =

Filipino theater founder

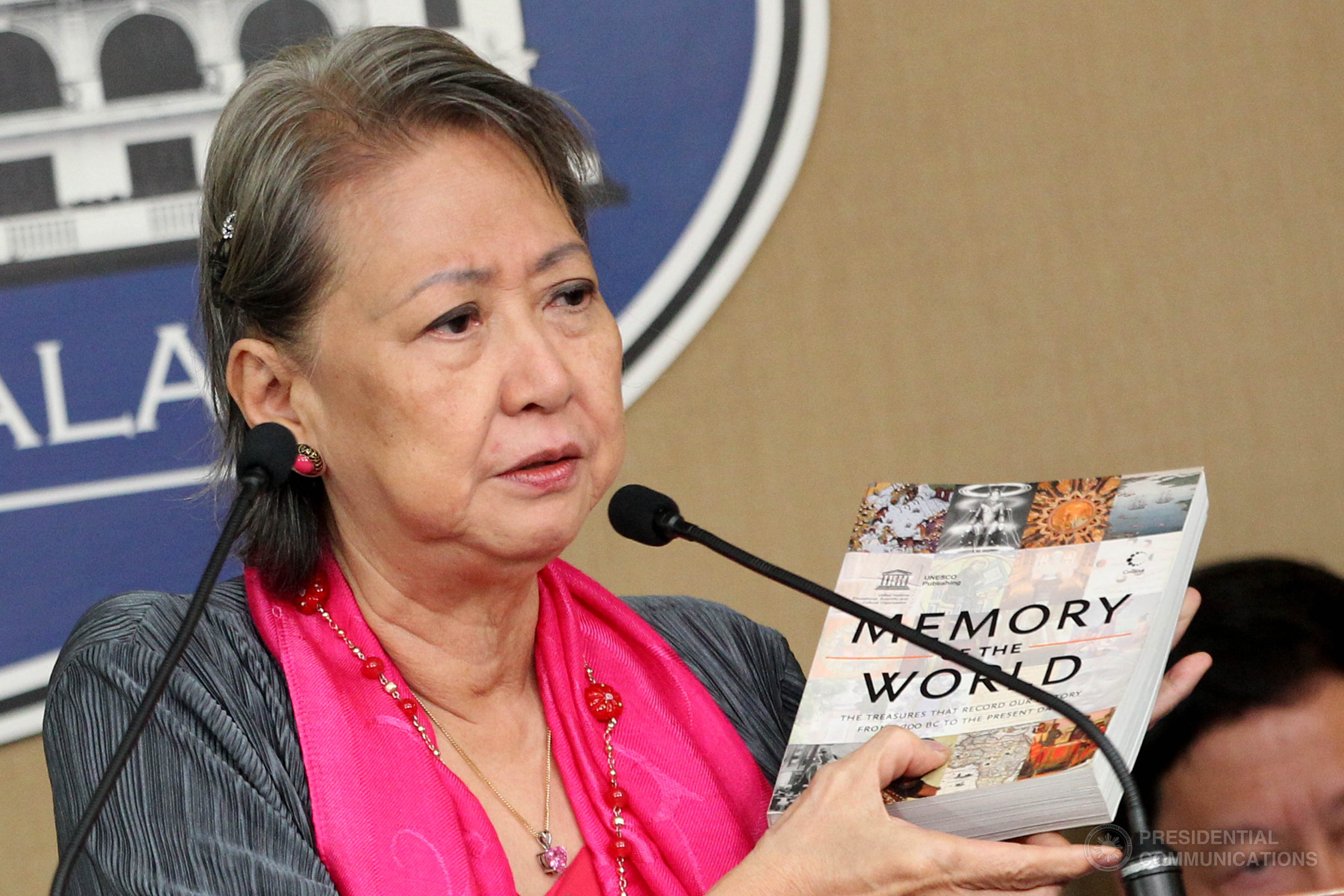
- Guidote-Alvarez in 2017
- Born: Cecile Reyez Guidote; November 13, 1943 (age 82); Manila, Philippines
- Occupations: actress; author; founder
- Years active: 1967-present
- Spouse: Heherson Alvarez (died 2020)

Cecile Guidote-Alvarez (born Cecile Reyes Guidote; November 13, 1943) is a Filipino actress, author, and founder of Philippine Educational Theater Association (PETA). She received the Ramon Magsaysay Award for Public Service in 1972.

Aside from establishing PETA, she is also the founding president of the Philippine Center of the International Theatre Institute (PCITI).

== Early life and education ==
Guidote was born on November 11, 1943, in Manila, Philippines as Cecile Reyes Guidote

From 1964 to 1967, she pursued graduate studies at the State University of New York and the Trinity University in Texas. Her thesis entitled “Prospectus for a National Theater” which envisioned a Philippine national theater movement.

== Career ==
Guidote-Alvarez returned to the Philippines and established Philippine Educational Theater Association (PETA) in April 7, 1967. In the early 1970s, PETA conducted workshops in the rural areas in cooperation with the Philippine Rural Reconstruction Movement.

After the declaration of martial law by President Ferdinand Marcos in 1972, she and her family went to the United States under a self-imposed exile. In New York City, she became part of the La MaMa Experimental Theatre Club.

She returned to the Philippines after Marcos was deposed in the People Power Revolution of February 1986.

She served as executive director of the National Commission for Culture and the Arts (NCCA) during the administration of President Gloria Macapagal Arroyo.

== Personal life ==
Guidote-Alvarez was married to Filipino politician Heherson Alvarez. According to her they underwent a secret marriage or a matrimonia concencia prior to Alvarez's exile during the early phases of the martial law era under president Ferdinand Marcos in the 1970s. She became a widow after Alvarez died of complications due to COVID-19 during the pandemic on April 20, 2020.

== Awards and recognition ==
- 1972: Ramon Magsaysay Outstanding Asian Award for Public Service
- 2003: UNESCO Artist for Peace Honor
