= I Do Bidoo Bidoo: Heto nAPO Sila! =

- Theatrical movie poster
- Directed by: Chris Martinez
- Written by: Chris Martinez
- Based on: The Music of Apo Hiking Society
- Produced by: Tony Gloria; Ray Espinosa
- Starring: Sam Concepcion; Tippy Dos Santos; Eugene Domingo; Gary Valenciano; Zsa Zsa Padilla; Ogie Alcasid; Jaime Fabregas; Neil Coleta; Frenchie Dy; Kiray Celis; Sweet Plantado; Gerald Pesigan
- Cinematography: Larry Manda
- Edited by: Randy Gabriel
- Music by: Vincent de Jesus; Apo Hiking Society
- Production companies: Straight Shooters Media; Studio 5; Unitel Productions
- Distributed by: OctoArts Films
- Release date: August 29, 2012
- Running time: 121 minutes
- Country: Philippines
- Language: Filipino
- Budget: ₱30 million
- Box office: ₱12,846,578.00

I Do Bidoo Bidoo: Heto nAPO Sila! is a 2012 Filipino musical, romantic-comedy film starring singers Sam Concepcion, Ogie Alcasid, Gary Valenciano, Zsa Zsa Padilla, comedian Eugene Domingo and introducing new actress Tippy Dos Santos. The film is produced by Unitel in partnership with Studio 5 and had a regular showing on August 29, 2012. The film features the music of Apo Hiking Society, as a tribute to one of the most influential OPM artists.

The film is directed by Chris Martinez, the one who is behind commercially successful films Kimmy Dora saga and Temptation Island (2011). On August 23, 2012, the film got the highest rating, "A" by the Cinema Evaluation Board. The movie opens with a generally positive reviews from movie critics and press, praising how the songs were fused into the movies storyline. However, the film was able to hit the theaters for 2 weeks only, with only 5 theaters on its third week. Although failed to penetrate the Filipino market, the film managed to compete at the Osaka Asian Film Festival in Japan and Far East Film Festival in Italy. It also received three awards in eleven nominations at the 2013 PMPC Star Awards for Movies.

The original soundtrack of the film entitled; I Do Bidoo Bidoo, Heto Napo Sila (Original Movie Soundtrack), was made available digitally on September 4, 2012. One week later, it reached #1 in the "Top Album" Chart of MyMusicStore.

== Plot ==
Rock Polotan (Concepcion) and Tracy Fuentebella (Dos Santos) are teenage sweethearts and both nursing students in a university in Manila, they are in love and full of dreams. A youthful indiscretion leads them to early parenthood, a situation they face squarely, and quite maturely, by planning to get married. They shortly realize, however, that the problem behind their wedding plans has less to do with themselves than with their own parents.

Rock's parents are an oddball couple with odd professions. Pol Polotan (Ogie Alcasid) is a one-hit-wonder composer now reduced to teaching guitar lessons to neighborhood kids. His sassy wife (Eugene Domingo) has the entrepreneurial smarts to be a caterer, even if it means her clientele are bereaved families at funeral parlors. Always struggling to rise above life's hard knocks, the Polotans (like your average Filipino family) manage to get by somehow through their keen sense of humor, resilience and resourcefulness.

At the other end of the social spectrum is Tracy's family, the Fuentebellas. A landowner son of a retired general, Tracy's father, Nick Fuentebella (Gary Valenciano), is a stuffed-shirt husband with more skills as a businessman than as a family man. Alienated by his passiveness and lack of ardor, his wife Elaine (Zsa Zsa Padilla) and daughter Tracy are mostly left to fend for themselves, when it comes to their own needs and problems. It also doesn't help that Nick's military father (Jaime Fabregas), a retired General, is a closed-minded conservative with no allowances for human frailties.

When the families finally meet for the eventual “pamamanhikan” at the palatial Fuentebella residence, what starts as a civilized encounter between two families escalates into a hilarious rich-versus-poor mano-a-mano where Tracy's grandfather (Jaime Fabregas) insulted the Polotan's family, a scenario that turns the mansion into a madhouse of outlandish proportions which resulted in Rock and Tracy's separation. Rock got depressed and did not leave his room for three days. He was confronted by his mother Rose, saying that life must go on. Rose thinks her son is still young for fatherhood, so she is not in favor of the marriage. Nick thinks the family would be in shame if Tracy will raise a child with no father, so he wants the wedding to push through as soon as possible. Elaine, who also got pregnant at a young age does not want her daughter to experience a forced marriage and get trapped in a loveless marriage as what had happened to her and her husband, Nick. Elaine suggested that it would be better if Tracy would just go to the US and give birth there, but before Tracy's departure, Rock was able to sneak into Tracy's room, and they elope. The two then sent an MMS to their families stating that they got married in the City hall. The two parties become so depressed because of Rock and Tracy's decision. Elaine seems to be disappointed with Nick. She thinks that Nick is not a good father to Tracy so their daughter grew up to be imperfect person. She decides to leave, but on her way out of the estate, Nick stops her and professes his undying love, stating that it would be best if they will try to start again. On the other hand, Rose and Pol also renew their love. Meanwhile, Brent (Coleta), Rock's best friend who is a closeted gay and is secretly in love with Rock, professes his love when they were drunk but the two remain best friends. In the end, the two families are able to accept the fate of Rock and Tracy who become parents at 19. The movie ends with the cast singing "Pag-Ibig", and "I Do Bidoo Bidoo".

== Cast and characters ==
- Sam Concepcion as Rock Polotan, a poor nursing student who impregnated Tracy
- Tippy Dos Santos as Tracy Fuentebella, a rich nursing student and love interest of Rock
- Eugene Domingo as Rose Polotan, mother of Rock; works in a catering service with Lilibeth and Vicky
- Ogie Alcasid as Pol Polotan, father of Rock and husband of Rose who happens to be a one-hit-wonder composer of a commercial song, Pumapatak na naman ang Ulan.
- Gary Valenciano as Nick Fuentebella, father of Tracy
- Zsa Zsa Padilla as Elaine Fuentebella, mother of Tracy
- Jaime Fabregas as retired General Fuentebella, Nick's father who objects to Tracy and Rock's wedding
- Neil Coleta as Brent, Rock's best friend, a closeted gay who is secretly in love with Rock
- Frenchie Dy as Lilibeth, Rose's best friend and co-worker in a catering service
- Kiray Celis as Jazzy Polotan, younger sister of Rock
- Sweet Plantado as Vicky, Rose's other best friend and co-worker in a catering service
- Gerald Pesigan as Raprap Polotan, younger brother of Rock
- John Mark Ibanez as Blake Fuentebella, little brother of Tracy
- Ismael Alshdefat as Austin Fuentebella, little brother of Tracy

Cameo role

- Apo Hiking Society (Jim Paredes, Boboy Garovillo and Danny Javier) as priests and major sponsors for Anna Polotan (Rock and Tracy's daughter) in her baptism
- John Lapus as an entertainer in a karaoke bar
- Edgar Allan Guzman - as one of the soldiers

== Production ==
=== Development ===
I Do Bidoo Bidoo is a dream project of Unitel Productions' big boss, Tony Gloria who is also behind successful movies like Working Girls and Crying Ladies. He also revealed that the film has been developed and finished for 5 years. The idea came up when he saw Mamma Mia! on the broadway more than 10 years ago. When Gloria noticed that the songs of APO were revived by various bands and became hits anew, he felt their songs would be great for a movie as it spans many generations, so he talked to APO member, Jim Paredes and signed them up to a contract. The contract expired two times before the project has been finalized. According to him, he knows that the Filipino audience is ready for this kind of musical extravaganza on the big screen, especially when the music comes very close to the heart of the Filipino just like the songs of Jim Paredes, Boboy Garovillo and Danny Javier who are collectively known as the Apo Hiking Society. Mr. Gloria, whose vision is shared, nurtured and upheld by Unitel's new President Ms. Madonna Tarrayo, added, “I wanted to give back something we can be proud of - for the Filipino, by the Filipino.”' The film is written and directed by the award-winning Chris Martinez who ably used APO Hiking music to move the story forward and punctuate pivotal scenes with the same. He is the mind behind successful comedy films like Kimmy Dora and "Ang Babae sa Septic Tank". The APO songs in the movie was rearranged by award-winning composer and musical director Vincent de Jesus. De Jesus was the musical director of hit movies Crying Ladies, La Visa Loca, Ang Babae Sa Septic Tank, Kimmy Dora and theater musicals Zsa Zsa Zaturnnah Ze Muzikal, Himala and Care Divas.

=== Background ===
The movie is a tribute to one of the greatest OPM artists, Apo Hiking Society. It is the first Filipino musical film, and dubbed as the Philippines' Mama Mia and as referred by the producers as the movie-oke(combination of movie and karaoke). In February 2012, Gary Valenciano made announced that the film he's doing after 17 years of acting hiatus is entitled I Do Bidoo Bidoo ( a lyric of one of the APO's hit). During the audition at the office of Unitel Productions, which co-produced the film with Studio 5, Dos Santos recalled that she and Concepcion were asked to read excerpts from the script. The two were chosen to play the lead role because of their theatrical experience after their successful musical stage play Peter Pan. On an interview of PEP to lead actor, Sam Concepcion, he stated that the film is going to be his biggest break on his acting career. On an interview with Ogie Alcasid, he stated, ...probably the biggest film I’ve ever done in terms of its scope, the concept and the music. The music of Apo, you know, ang music ng buhay natin (the soundtrack of our life).... Being an advocate of OPM, he added that the movie will hopefully introduce the music of Apo to today's youth.Eugene Domingo, the sought-after comedian, is the only non-recording artist among the main cast of the movie-musical who admits that she took voice lessons in order to justify her role. According to the director, and other movie critics, the love scene of Domingo and Alcasid is one of the best parts of the film.Jim Paredes, the only member of APO who attended the grand press conference and watched the movie in advanced commented,

“I think it will show that there’s enough material within the Philippine repertoire to be able to do a stuff like this.”

=== Filming ===
The "Blue Jeans" scene, being shot in De La Salle University (Dasmariñas).

With an estimated budget of PHP 30 million, the film began principal photography in January 2012, but was sparsely scheduled throughout the year with a total of 27 shooting days. The film continues to shoot at the height of summer season to be able to film the outdoor choreography, under choreographer Nancy Crow. According to the producers, the film features a total of 18 songs from the APO, with the cast singing the songs. The scene in "Blue Jeans" of Concepcion and Coleta along with 350 background dancers, was shot inside the De La Salle University in Dasmariñas, Cavite. The farm of the Fuentebella's was shot in Nueva Ecija, while the numerous gates of the mansion was taken in Bulacan. The Polotan's residence was shot in Liliw, Laguna. Some of the scenes were shot in China town in Binondo, Manila especially the scene where Coleta and Concepcion, both drunk, running for home while the rain is pouring down. The "Ang Syota kong Pa-Class" number of Concepcion and Coleta was shot in a basketball court in Baranggay Roxas, Caloocan.

The trailer was first presented in the MTRCB but got an X-Rating because of Alcasid-Domingo love scene that is included in the film. It was removed in the trailer, and is expected to still be included in the movie.

== Marketing and promotions ==
The full trailer was released via video-sharing site YouTube on July 27, 2012, which features a peek to some of the APO Hiking hits like Batang-bata Ka Pa, Awit ng Barkada and more. On August 12, 2012 Zsa Zsa Padilla and Gary Valenciano promoted the film in a variety show, ASAP in ABS-CBN. Meanwhile, Ogie Alcasid also promoted the film in the counterpart show of ASAP, Party Pilipinas and in Manny Many Prizes in GMA Network. On August 19, 2012, the cast of the film had a promotional show in TriNoMa in Quezon City. The movie will have its nationwide premiere on August 29, 2012, and is expected for release also in the United States and other countries.

The I Do Bidoo Bidoo promotional caricature at SM Megamall.

On August 21, 2012, the music video for the track Do Bidoo Bidoo had a world premiere through music channel MYX Philippines. The song was originally written and produced by Apo Hiking Society and was covered by one of the cast, Ogie Alcasid. The video which was directed by Pancho Esguerra, Alcasid first appears in his "Pol Polotan" character as a clapper in Hawaiian shirt that shouts, “Ogie Almasen music video, I Do Bidoo…Action!” before switching to his Ogie Alcasid-aura. As “Doo Bidoo” the song progresses, both Ogie and Pol find themselves duetting on the song's chorus before a surprise guest, Apo's Jim Paredes, shows up as a piano player before later joining Ogie and hamming it up with the singer on the final chorus.

On August 23, 2012, the film had a special screening held at the Gateway Mall wherein the gross will be donated to the victims of a recent calamity in the Philippines through Shining Light Foundation. The screening was mostly attended by entertainment press and celebrities. The film got mostly positive reviews, and referred as "highly recommended" film. On August 28, 2012, the film will have a special screening at the SM Megamall organized by batchmates of actress, Domingo. The said screening will be a fund-raising event fot Stella Maris College.

Since the film was only shown in theaters for two weeks, the film had a special screening at the Cine Adarna in the University of the Philippines Film Institute from October 5 to 9, 2012. It was attended by the director, an UP Alumni Chriz Martinez, and casts including Sam Concepcion and Tippy Dos Santos.

=== International screening ===
Date	Country	Notes/Venue	Reference
October 13 – 18	Guam	Megaplex Cinemas	
October 19	Guam	Guam Premier Outlets Hollywood Theaters	
November 30	New York City	IndieHouse Cinema	
November 30	San Diego	Gaslamp Cinema	
December 7	Hawaii	Pearlridge Theater	

=== International Film Festivals ===
After its various screenings particularly in the USA, the film is set to be shown in Japan as an official entry in the 'Competition Section' of Osaka Asian Film Festival or OAFF. On January 14, Teruoka Suzo, programming director for the said festival personally sent an inquiry to director Martinez, and on January 25, it finally made it to the official entries. The film festival runs through March 8 to 17, 2013. On March 14, it premieres at the Umeda Berg 7 Theater in Osaka with English and Japanese subtitles. According to Martinez who is present at the screening, "...the audience laughed and applauded in the same parts where Pinoys did!..." However, the film failed to bag any of the 5 awards given by the film festival.

On February 22, the director of the film announced that the film will be competing for "The Far East Film Festival" in Udine, Italy from April 19 to 27, 2013. Dedicated to showcasing Asian Cinema at its best, the Far East Film Festival was once dubbed as “The Richest Festival in Europe”. It highlights the best of Asian cinema by focusing on a few movies that stood out above the rest in the preceding year. Martinez did not specify the details of the participation of “I Do Bidoo Bidoo” in the festival including which section it will compete. The film also participated at the Taipei Golden Horse Film Festival in Taiwan in November 2013.

=== Box-office performance ===
As of September 2, 2012, the movie grosses PHP 5,808,653. The movie has an additional PHP 600,000 during the special screening, totalling gross to PHP 6,400,000. On the second week, the film grosses 2,073,635 on the weekend. As of September 9, 2012, the film grosses a total of PHP 13,500,000 No data were collected on its third week. Meanwhile, Tim Cual stated in Philippine Daily Inquirer:

"...the lackluster box-office performance of ‘I Do Bidoo Bidoo’ seems to indicate that Pinoys are not yet ready for local screen musicals. This is unfortunate, because it’s one of the best films produced this year. It’s also ironic that we always complain about basura movies (non-sense movies) earning mega-bucks, but when a good film comes along, moviegoers are nowhere to be found!".

== Critical reception ==
Professional ratings
Review scores
Source	Rating
Tempo	5/5 stars
Click the City	3.5/5 stars
User Reviews	5/5 stars
GMA News	4/5 stars
Ihcahieh	5/5 stars
The Guidon	4/5 stars

The movie received mostly positive reviews from different critics. According to Mario Bautista of Malaya, "...the movie based on the hit songs of APO, is an endearing musical comedy that is the best local film we have seen so far this year. If by any chance you don’t get to like it, then you must be a grumpy grouchy curmudgeon who does not believe people can just burst into song-and-dance numbers, so you surely won’t enjoy this big sing-along fest...accomplishes what our favorite samples of this genre do. The musical sequences are highly entertaining, uplifting and contagious". He also added that it's everything a movie-goer would want in a movie and the timeless crowd-pleaser is most certainly highly recommended. He also added that Concepcion is simply sensational while Coleta could be in a Best Supporting Actor award. Cristina Martinez-Belen of Manila Bulletin also gave the film a positive review. She stated, "...i’ve never enjoyed a Filipino movie as much as I enjoyed this(I Do Bidoo Bidoo) which is being dubbed the grand movie-oke of the year...very Filipino in soul and essence. And the performance of the stars is impeccably admirable and superb". One of the print ads for the film shows some of local movie critics’ assessment of the film. They herald “I Do Bidoo Bidoo” as “an endearing musical comedy” that's "highly entertaining, uplifting, affecting and contagious." Another raved that the music of the Apo Hiking Society that's featured in the film “rocks.” Still another went as far as to say that it's the “Best Picture Of The Year.” Ria Limjap of SPOT.ph also gave the film a favorable review stating, "The pamamanhikan scene is brilliant: old fashioned metaphoric speech, initiating an awesome salawikain battle that segues into one of the most charming numbers in the movie (“Salawikain”)." The same goes with the review from Philippine Entertainment Portal (PEP), stating that the movie is a total charmer and its production design is just as excellent, while every backdrop looks meticulously planned. It further added, "Well-choreographed musical numbers help the film feel fresh, and the decision to use songs from the Apo Hiking Society hike the nostalgia." He also praises that all casts are perfect for the role. A review from GMA News gave the film a 4/5 rating. The writer, Job B. De Leon states that, "...beyond the music and the actors, it draws strength from its script as it probes the different angles of a teenage pregnancy–how a young couple tries to deal with uncertainty and responsibility, and how parents recover when their darlings color outside the lines of their pre-drawn aspirations[...]for all the film's dramatic build-up, there is no climactic moralizing or grand confrontation. Instead the denouement is set to song and highlights to audiences, young and old alike, that together with values like love, friendship and family, the music of APO is forever". The Cinema Evaluation Board, who gave the film the highest rating, "A" states that the film has exceptional performances. Mell Navarro of Independent Cinema Artists of the Philippines commented, "A must-see film! Wonderful! Brilliant!". According to Bong Austero of Manila Standard Today, "...It (I Do Bidoo Bidoo) is in many ways even better than foreign musicals. For one, it features music that has relevance and meaning in our lives. Second, it’s a movie that makes you feel good about being Filipino." He further stated, "...we are told that it is not exactly making the kind of money that Praybeyt Benjamin or No Other Woman made, which is really sad because I Do Bidoo Bidoo is infinitely better than those two other films, which were major blockbusters...if you don’t patronize movies like I Do Bidoo Bidoo, then you should stop complaining about the sorry state of Philippine cinema."Ateneo de Manila University's official publication, The Guidon gave the film 4 stars of 5 and included it at #6 on their "2012 Top Films".

A review from Jozza Palaganas of Yahoo Philippines states that, "...the film in its entirety is an explosion of color, texture and music you'd want to sing along and sway your head to. And it was so well cast, it's hard to imagine the production being the same if any of the actors are changed." She also added, "..they(Unitel, Studio5 and Chris Martinez) braved the single genre that Filipino filmmakers almost never touch."

Meanwhile, the movie review of Philbert Ortiz Dy from Click The City states that, '"...it manages to build a fairly credible story out of the songs. The narrative gets a little loose at times, but by and large it manages to find the heart of these songs and build something clever out of it...". However, it cited that, "the camerawork is generally uninspiring, the same two or three movements played out over and over. But it manages to delight much more than it disappoints. It sings heartily, offering audiences a sense of joy and fun often missing from our cinema."

A review from The New York Times gave the film a generally positive one. According to Jon Caramanica, "Given that music drives the story here, it’s notable that color feels more prominent than sound[...]filmed in a hyperreal style in which the prints on the clothes of Rosie and her friends scream louder than they do. Everyone sings, but color is life." He also added, "“I Do Bidoo Bidoo,” an exuberant if creaky Filipino musical that never lets story get in the way of its songs."

== Soundtrack ==
The Original Soundtrack of the film entitled; I Do Bidoo Bidoo: Heto Napo Sila (Original Movie Soundtrack), was made available digitally on September 4, 2012. On September 13, it reached #1 in the "Top Album" Chart of MyMusicStore.

No.	Title	Artist	Length
1.	"Overture - Panalangin/Ewan"	Jim Paredes, Louie Ocampo
2.	"Do Bidoo Bidoo"	Ogie Alcasid
3.	"Syotang Pa-Class"	Sam Concepcion, Eugene Domingo
4.	"Awit ng Barkada"	Sweet Plantado, Frenchie Dy
5.	"Panalangin Intro"	Sam Concepcion, Tippy Dos Santos
6.	"Tuyo Nang Damdamin"	Zsa Zsa Padilla
7.	"Mahirap Magmahal Ng Syota Ng Iba"	Neil Coleta
8.	"Panalangin"	Sam Concepcion, Tippy Dos Santos
9.	"Salawikain"	Sweet Plantado, Frenchie Dy and All Cast
10.	"Nakapagtataka"	Gary Valenciano, Ogie Alcasid, Zsa Zsa Padilla, Eugene Domingo, Sam Concepcion, Tippy Dos Santos
11.	"Batang-Bata Ka Pa"	Gary Valenciano, Eugene Domingo, Sam Concepcion, Tippy Dos Santos
12.	"Blue Jeans"	Sam Concepcion
13.	"Pumapatak Ang Ulan"	John Lapus
14.	"Kaibigan"	Neil Coleta, Sam Concepcion
15.	"Huwag Masanay Sa Pagmamahal"	Ogie Alcasid, Eugene Domingo
16.	"Ewan"	Sam Concepcion, Tippy Dos Santos
17.	"Paano"	Gary Valenciano
18.	"Di Na Natutuo/Kabilugan ng Buwan"	Ogie Alcasid, Eugene Domingo
19.	"Pag-Ibig"	Ogie Alcasid, Eugene Domingo, Zsa Zsa Padilla, Gary Valenciano, Sam Concepcion, Tippy Dos Santos
20.	"Do Bidoo Bidoo Finale"	Jaime Fabregas and All Cast

== Home video ==
The DVD and VCD format of the film was released on February 16, 2013.

== Awards ==
The film received total of 11 nominations for the 29th PMPC Star Wards for Movies that was held on March 10, 2013. The movie has the second highest number of nominations behind Star Cinema's One More Try and The Mistress. The film bagged 3 awards including New Movie Actor and Actress of the Year and Best Musical Scorer. The film received the most nominations at the 10th Golden Screen Awards for Movies of Entertainment Press Society, Inc. (EnPress) held on April 27, 2013, at the Teatrino Greenhills in San Juan City. The film won 4 awards including Best Motion Picture for Comedy. It garnered the second most wins following Bwakaw with 6 trophies.

Award Giving Body	Award	Recipient(s)	Result
29th PMPC Star Awards for Movies
29th PMPC Star Awards for Movies	Movie of the Year		Nominated
29th PMPC Star Awards for Movies	Movie Director of the Year	Chris Martinez	Nominated
29th PMPC Star Awards for Movies	Movie Screenwriter of the Year	Chris Martinez	Nominated
29th PMPC Star Awards for Movies	Movie Supporting Actor of the Year	Neil Coleta	Nominated
29th PMPC Star Awards for Movies	New Movie Actor of the Year	Neil Coleta	Won
29th PMPC Star Awards for Movies	New Movie Actress of the Year	Tippy Dos Santos	Won
29th PMPC Star Awards for Movies	Movie Cinematographer of the Year	Larry Manda	Nominated
29th PMPC Star Awards for Movies	Movie Production Designer of the Year	Digo Ricio	Nominated
29th PMPC Star Awards for Movies	Movie Editor of the Year	Randy Gabriel	Nominated
29th PMPC Star Awards for Movies	Movie Musical Scorer of the Year	Vincent de Jesus	Won
29th PMPC Star Awards for Movies	Movie Sound Engineer of the Year	Albert Michael Idioma	Nominated
10th Golden Screen Awards for Movies
10th Golden Screen Awards for Movies	Best Motion Picture-Musical or Comedy		Won
10th Golden Screen Awards for Movies	Best Direction	Chris Martinez	Nominated
10th Golden Screen Awards for Movies	Best Story	Chris Martinez	Nominated
10th Golden Screen Awards for Movies	Best Original Screenplay	Chris Martinez	Nominated
10th Golden Screen Awards for Movies	Best Performance by an Actor in a Lead Role-Musical or Comedy	Sam Concepcion	Nominated
10th Golden Screen Awards for Movies	Best Performance by an Actor in a Lead Role-Musical or Comedy	Gary Valenciano	Nominated
10th Golden Screen Awards for Movies	Best Performance by an Actor in a Lead Role-Musical or Comedy	Ogie Alcasid	Nominated
10th Golden Screen Awards for Movies	Best Performance by an Actress in a Lead Role-Musical or Comedy	Eugene Domingo	Nominated
10th Golden Screen Awards for Movies	Best Performance by an Actress in a Lead Role-Musical or Comedy	Zsa Zsa Padilla	Nominated
10th Golden Screen Awards for Movies	Best Performance by an Actress in a Supporting Role-Drama, Musical or Comedy	Frenchie Dy	Nominated
10th Golden Screen Awards for Movies	Best Performance by an Actor in a Supporting Role-Drama, Musical or comedy	Neil Coleta	Nominated
10th Golden Screen Awards for Movies	Best Breakthrough Performance by an Actress	Tippy Dos Santos	Won
10th Golden Screen Awards for Movies	Best Breakthrough Performance by an Actress	Sweet Plantado	Nominated
10th Golden Screen Awards for Movies	Best Cinematography	Larry Manda	Nominated
10th Golden Screen Awards for Movies	Best Editing	Randy Gabriel	Won
10th Golden Screen Awards for Movies	Best Production Design	Digo Ricio	Nominated
10th Golden Screen Awards for Movies	Best Sound Design	Albert Michael Idioma	Nominated
10th Golden Screen Awards for Movies	Best Musical Score	Vincent de Jesus	Won
10th Golden Screen Awards for Movies	Best Visual/Special Effects	Unitel Productions and Optima Digital	Nominated
