= Sam Concepcion (album) =

Studio album by Sam Concepcion
- Released: September 2007
- Recorded: 2007
- Genre: Pop
- Length: 42:02
- Label: Universal

Sam Concepcion chronology
| Sam Concepcion (2007) | Pop Class (2010) |

Singles from Sam Concepcion
- 1. "Even If" Released: August 4, 2007; 2. "Happy"; 3. "I'll Find Your Heart"

Sam Concepcion is the self-titled, first studio album of the teen sensation Sam Concepcion. It was released under Universal Records on early September 2007. The album was certified Gold by the Philippine Association of the Record Industry.

== Album information ==
The album was pre-recorded early in 2007. The album contains 11 tracks. It carries out three lead singles. The first single was Even If which is a revived song from the French boy band 2Be3. The next two single was also released right after Even If. The last single I'll find Your Heart was a hit and even topped the MYX chart. Happy the second single is an original Jackson 5/Michael Jackson. The three lead single was released with a music video.

The song Stay the Same, originally from Joey McIntyre was also included in the album.

== Track listing ==
CD
| No. | Title | Lyrics | Length |
|---|---|---|---|
| 1. | "Even If" (Originally sung by the French boyband 2Be3) | Amato, Nevil | 4:14 |
| 2. | "Happy" (Originally sung by Michael Jackson) | Legrand, Robinson | 3:50 |
| 3. | "I'll Find Your Heart" | Rakascan, Shahin, Yacoub | 4:05 |
| 4. | "Stay the Same" (Originally sung by Joey McIntyre) | Carrier, McIntyre | 3:51 |
| 5. | "Hanggang Tingin" | Oblenida, Villa | 3:48 |
| 6. | "Wishing You'll Be Mine" | Bon | 4:37 |
| 7. | "Kay Dali" | Ito Rapadas | 3:25 |
| 8. | "Paano Na" | Galarion, Galarion | 4:28 |
| 9. | "Walang Hanggan" | DelRosario | 3:52 |
| 10. | "Da Doo Ron Ron" (Originally Sung by The Crystals) | Barry, Greenwich, Spector | 2:24 |
| 11. | "Come Everybody" | Nilsson, Uhlmann | 3:27 |
| Total length: | | | 42:02 |

== Certification ==
| Country | Provider | Sales | Certification |
|---|---|---|---|
| Philippines | PARI | 10,000+ | Gold |

== I'll Find Your Heart (Music+Videos) ==
Sam Concepcion "I'll Find Your Heart" (Music+Videos)

Studio album by Sam Concepcion
- Released: 2008
- Genre: Pop
- Length: 16:07
- Label: Universal

I'll Find Your Heart (Music+Videos) is a repackaged album of Sam Concepcion's first album. It was released under Universal in 2008. The repackaged album contains the three main singles from Concepcion's debut album plus its corresponding videos. "Stay the Same" was also included on the track list.

=== Track listing ===
CD
| No. | Title | Lyrics | Length |
|---|---|---|---|
| 1. | "Data (Not Playable)" |
| 2. | "I'll Find Your Heart" (Music Video) |
| 3. | "Happy" (Music Video) |
| 4. | "Even If" (Music Video) |
| 5. | "I'll Find Your Heart" | Rakascan, Shahin, Yacoub | 4:05 |
| 6. | "Happy" | Legrand, Robinson | 3:50 |
| 7. | "Even If" | Amato, Nevil | 3:14 |
| 8. | "Stay the Same" | Galarion, Galarion | 3:51 |
| Total length: | | | 16:07 |

== Other information ==
- The first single (Even If) was featured in one of Your Song's episode.
