= Tippy Dos Santos =

Filipino American singer and actress

- Born: Stephanie Denise Dos Santos (Note: Dos Santos does not possess her mother's maiden name which is Esquivias.); August 16, 1994 (age 32); Houston, Texas, U.S.
- Citizenship: Philippines
- Education: University of the Philippines Diliman (BS, JD)
- Occupations: Actress; Singer; VJ; Lawyer
- Years active: 2009–present
- Spouse: Miguel Porcuna (m. 2022)

Stephanie Denise Porcuna (née Dos Santos; born August 16, 1994), better known by her stage name Tippy Dos Santos, is a Filipino singer, actress and lawyer. She first appeared on Ruffa & Ai in 2009.

Dos Santos is a member of ABS-CBN's circle of homegrown talents named Star Magic. In July 2013, she collaborated with singers Sam Concepcion and Quest to interpret the song "Dati" composed by Thyro Alfaro and Yumi Lacsamana, which won the grand prize at the 2nd Philippine Popular Music Festival.

== Early life ==
She was born in Houston, Texas to a Filipino mother (Happy Esquivias) and a Brazilian-American father (John Dos Santos). Since she was nine years old, Dos Santos sang at corporate events and also performed in kids' musicals for the Ateneo Children's Theater and for the theater group Trumpets. She also won a regional singing contest and was a grand finalist in the World Championship of Performing Arts (WCOPA) of 2008.

== Career ==
In 2009, Dos Santos began her career in the Philippine entertainment industry. She first made a guest appearance on Ruffa & Ai, in which she sang "Journey to the Past" from Anastasia. She then started acting on television with the 2010 drama 1DOL as the younger sister of Sam Milby's character. In 2011, she took a supporting role on the series Growing Up. The following year, she had her film debut alongside Sam Concepcion in I Do Bidoo Bidoo: Heto nAPO Sila!. She picked up several awards for her performance in that film, including She was then paired alongside Igi Boy Flores in the teen comedy series Luv U.

In July 2013, Dos Santos collaborated with Concepcion and the singer Quest to interpret the song "Dati" composed by Thyro Alfaro and Yumi Lacsamana, which won the grand prize at the 2nd Philippine Popular Music Festival. Their version was nominated for "Favorite Collaboration" at the 2014 MYX Music Awards.

In 2015, Dos Santos was the opening act for Boyce Avenue's concert in Manila. This was also the year she joined the Myx tv channel as one of their VJs along with Erica Abello and Diego Loyzaga. On August 27, she had her debut concert, "Unfolded". On October 9, she released her self-titled debut album. That year, she also featured on the ballet production of Pinocchio as the Pink Fairy. In 2016, she co-hosted the Awit Awards with Matteo Guidecelli and also came home with two Awit Awards for "Parang Wala Lang". She also got to perform on stage alongside David Archuleta during his concert. In 2018, she had a role in the international indie thriller film Abomination which was directed by Yam Laranas.

== Personal life ==
On March 31, 2022, Dos Santos married pilot Miguel Porcuna after four years of dating each other.

Dos Santos first graduated with a Bachelor of Science degree in Family Life & Child Development. She then graduated from the University of the Philippines College of Law in August 2022 with a dean's medalist for academic excellence. She passed the 2022 Philippine Bar Examination and is pending her admission to the Integrated Bar of the Philippines before officially becoming a lawyer.

On December 30, 2023, Dos Santos' mother, Happy Esquivias Dos Santos, died in a vehicular accident while on vacation in Seoul, South Korea, at the age of 58.

She is the niece of actor Johnny Delgado.

== Awards and nominations ==
- 2013- New Movie Actress of the Year at the 29th PMPC Star Awards for Movies (for I Do Bidoo Bidoo: Heto nAPO Sila!)
- 2013- Best Breakthrough Performance by an Actress at the 10th Golden Screen Awards for Movies (for I Do Bidoo Bidoo: Heto nAPO Sila!)
- 2016- Best R&B Recording at the 29th Awit Awards (for "Parang Wala Lang")
- 2016- Best Performance by a Female Recording Artist at the 29th Awit Awards (for "Parang Wala Lang")

== Filmography ==
=== Film ===
Year	Title	Role
2012	I Do Bidoo Bidoo: Heto nAPO Sila!	Tracy Fuentabella
2013	Raketeros	Juicy
2013	Kimmy Dora: Ang Kiyemeng Prequel	Cameo appearance
2014	Once A Princess	Nina Ryans
2015	Crazy Beautiful You	Margaret Alcantara
2018	Abomination	Rachel Rivera

=== Television ===
Year	Title	Role
2009	Ruffa & Ai	Herself
2010	1DOL	Carol Serrano
2010	Wansapanataym: Bandanang Itim	Athena
2010	Shout Out!	Herself
2010	Sabel	Young Margaret
2011–present	ASAP	Herself/performer
2011	Growing Up	Michelle
2012	Princess and I	Adriana
2012	Luv U	Paris Delos Santos
2013	Maalaala Mo Kaya: Orasan	Young Gina
2013	Jim Fernandez's Galema, Anak Ni Zuma	Mindy
2015–2017	myx	VJ

== Discography ==
=== Album ===
- Tippy Dos Santos (2015)

=== Singles ===
==== As a lead artist ====
List of singles, showing year released, selected chart positions, and name of the album
Title	Year	Peak chart positions	Album
Title	Year	PHL	Album
"Dati" (featuring Sam Concepcion and Quest)	2013	—	Tippy Dos Santos
"Parang Wala Lang"	2015	—	Tippy Dos Santos
"Open Ended (Acoustic Version)"	2017	—	Non-album single

==== As a featured artist ====
List of singles, with year released and album name shown
Title	Year	Peak chart position	Album
Title	Year	PHL Songs	Album
"Rockin' Them Jeans" (with Enrique Gil)	2013	—	King of the Gil
"Umpisa" (with Jensen Gomez)	2013	—	Umpisa
"Takipsilim" (with Gloc-9)	2014	—	Biyahe ng Pangarap
