= Sam Concepcion =

Filipino actor and singer

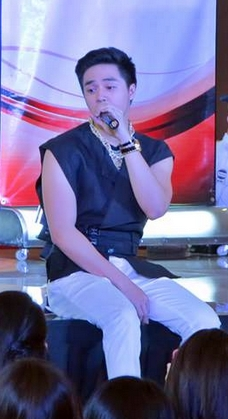
- Concepcion in 2013

Background information
- Born: Samuel Lawrence Lopez Concepcion; October 17, 1992 (age 34)
- Origin: Manila, Philippines
- Genres: Pop, P-pop, R&B, OPM
- Occupations: Singer; dancer; actor; host; model stylist; VJ
- Instruments: Vocals, piano, guitar
- Years active: 1999–present
- Labels: Stages (2002–present); Star Magic (2005–2017); TV5 Network (2008–2009; 2021–present); Viva Artists Agency (2017–present); Universal Records (2007–2017); Viva Records (2017–present)
- Website: www.samconcepcion.net

Samuel Lawrence Lopez Concepcion (born October 17, 1992) is a Filipino singer, dancer, actor, VJ and host. in April 2006 Concepcion won the Big Division in the first season of Little Big Star. Concepcion signed a contract under Stages and ABS-CBN's Star Magic. Concepcion began with 12 theater roles and participated in plays at a young age, including the role of Edmund Pevensie in the local adaptation of The Lion, The Witch, and The Wardrobe and Mr. Noah's Big Boat. He played Peter Pan from 2002 to 2012. Aside from theater roles, he has acted in movies including Way Back Home and Shake, Rattle & Roll 13. His first lead role came in 2012 in the first Filipino musical-film entitled, I Do Bidoo Bidoo: Heto nAPO Sila!. He had his first role in television in ABS-CBN's Mga Anghel na Walang Langit, and his major break was as Boy Bawang in Super Inggo.

In 2007, Concepcion launched his self-titled album under Universal Records. It was certified Gold by the Philippine Association of the Record Industry. He launched two other albums, Pop Class (2010), and Forever Young (2011). The latter was his biggest hit, charting at Number 1 for seven straight weeks. In 2008, Concepcion was chosen by DreamWorks to sing the theme song of Kung Fu Panda, entitled, "Kung Fu Fighting", which was included in the Asian soundtrack album. With this project, Concepcion is the first Filipino artist to have collaborated with DreamWorks.

Concepcion was an ambassador for many agencies and organizations. He was appointed by the Department of Education as 'Youth Role Model and Spokesperson' and National Book Development Board's (NBDB) 'Get Caught Reading campaign' ambassador in 2007. In 2008, Concepcion was appointed by the Business Software Alliance as the Official Spokesperson of the Philippines for 'B4USurf', 'Youth Ambassador for Education and the Arts' in the 3rd District of Manila and World Vision's 'Ambassador for Children'.

Concepcion was given a representative role by the Department of Tourism to the Korea World Travel Fair (2006). He was chosen by the Philippine government to sing in front of the President of the Philippines, Gloria Macapagal Arroyo and world economic leaders during APEC's 'Business Advisory Council Gala' opening. He was awarded by the United Nations Youth Association of the Philippines the United Nations Association of the Philippines "Outstanding Youth Leader Awards".

== Early life ==
Concepcion was born on October 17, 1992, in Manila, to Raymund and Gene Concepcion, both actors from the Metropolitan Theater. He is the third of four children and siblings to Kuya Red (24), Diko Kevin (23) and as Sangko Sam(19) to their younger sister, Gabby (13). After he was born, their parents eventually stopped acting so they were not able to see them perform, however, it led Concepcion to theater roles as his parents had done. Concepcion was home schooled under the International Studies. At two years old, Concepcion was able to carry a tune and dance to simple songs. At five years old, he had his first public performance at a worship cantata that landed him the role of the young Jose Rizal in a stage play entitled, Sino Ka Ba, Jose Rizal? During the play, he was discovered by David Cosico, a talent manager, who then encouraged him to sign with S.T.A.G.E.S. and enroll in Trumpets Playshop music theatre class to hone his talent. Concepcion had already appeared in plays, starting at age nine. This included the role of Edmund Pevensie in the local stage adaptation of The Lion, The Witch, and The Wardrobe, Peter Pan and the Time Machine and Mr. Noah's Big Boat. Concepcion appeared on television in a commercial featuring him and his real-life dad in Maggi Sinigang sa Miso. He appeared on various shows for children on ABS-CBN, such as Sineskwela and Hirayamanawari. Concepcion had a regular hosting stint on ABC-5's (now TV5's) A.S.T.I.G. (All Set To Imitate God), a children's show about God.

Concepcion's musical influences include Gary Valenciano, Michael Jackson, Justin Timberlake, Chris Brown, Billy Crawford and Christian Bautista. Concepcion was invited to guest at two of Christian Bautista's concerts namely, Dunkin Donuts: Color Everywhere in March 2005 and Heartfelt in November 2005.

== Career ==
=== 2005–2006 ===
Concepcion's first major television exposure came through singing competition Little Big Star, which searched for young singing talent. He was initially dubbed the Singing Crush ng Bayan throughout the show and became the crowd favorite. He was awarded the My Favorite Star Award for earning 52% of viewer votes, the highest percentage. During the Grand Finals, Concepcion sang "I Can't Stand Still" from Footloose. He eventually won the competition with "The Brightest Star" for the Big Division over competitors Gian Barbarona and Charice. Concepcion took part in ABS-CBN's primetime shows, and first appeared on a drama series, Mga Anghel na Walang Langit, in a minor role. His first major role was in the fantasy series, Super Inggo as Boy Bawang. After winning the competition, Concepcion joined ASAP '06 where he became part of the group, Three-O, with Aldred Gatchalian and Aaron Agassi. The group disbanded when Agassi left. He was given his first starring role when he was featured on Your Song with Empress Schuck as part of the network's Christmas offering. The same Your Song episode was rebroadcast in 2007.

In June 2006, Concepcion, along with other Trumpets Playshop talents, was tasked by the Philippines' Department of Tourism to represent the country for the Korea World Travel Fair. Their team brought home the Best Folk Performance Award. In the same month, Concepcion was chosen by the Philippine government to sing in front of President Gloria Macapagal Arroyo and world economic leaders during APEC's Business Advisory Council Gala Opening. In July that year, he won Nickelodeon's Pinoy Wannabe Award with 40% of the votes, becoming the youngest and sole male recipient. In September 2006, Concepcion appeared on a magazine cover for the first time for Candy magazine. In that issue, he was announced as the Top Candy Cutie for 2006. He held the title for three consecutive years; no other local celebrity has held since. In October 2006, Sam had his first concert via a back-to-back birthday celebration with Christian Bautista.

=== 2007–2009 ===
Concepcion's next major television project was Walang Kapalit, a series starring Claudine Barretto and Piolo Pascual. He portrayed the young Noel. Concepcion was a voice actor for the local anime network, Hero TV, voicing Koyuki, the protagonist of the Japanese musical anime, Beck. In June 2007, Concepcion went back to theater. He played Ryan Evans in the stage musical of Disney's High School Musical. He played Blaine Anderson in the stage musical of Fox's Glee and another the film School of Rock and Pitch Perfect, scoring positive reviews.

In September 2007, Concepcion launched his first solo, self-titled album for Universal Records. His first single was "Even If", a revived song from the American boy band 2Be3. His second single was a Jackson 5 hit, "Happy". The last single from the album, "I'll Find Your Heart" topped various charts of MYX Philippines. The album was later certified Gold by the Philippine Association of the Record Industry.

In February 2008, Concepcion became part of ABS-CBN's Star Magic, signing a co-management contract with Stages and was launched at ASAP '08. In May 2008, Concepcion was chosen by DreamWorks to sing the theme song of Kung Fu Panda, entitled, "Kung Fu Fighting", which was included in its Asian soundtrack album. With this project, Concepcion became the first Filipino artist to have collaborated with DreamWorks.

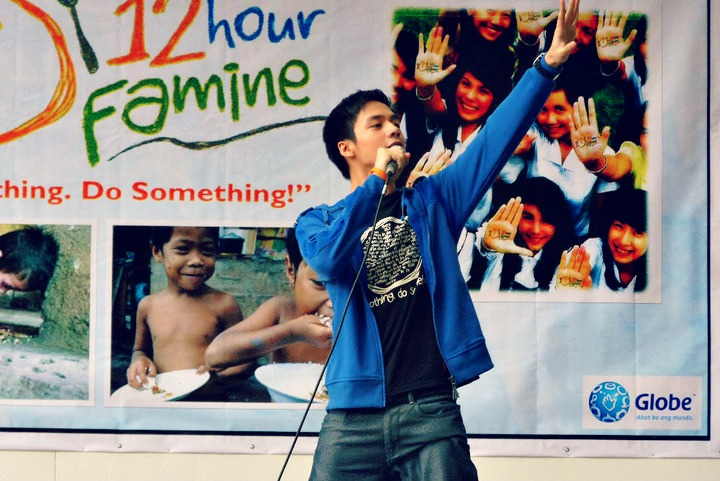
Sam Concepcion at the World Vision's "Youth Campaign Against Hunger" in St. Scholastica, Manila in 2011.

Concepcion won Favorite New Artist in the 3rd MYX Music Awards in March 2008. This win made him the category's youngest winner as he garnered 61% of the votes. In 2009, Concepcion won Top Teen Male Entertainer award in the first Pure & Fresh Top Teens Awards. In August 2009, Concepcion was awarded by the United Nations Youth Association of the Philippines the UNAP Outstanding Youth Leader award for his positive achievements in the Entertainment category.

Aside from album release and theater roles, Concepcion returned to doing regular television shows in August 2008 on the remake of a Colombian series, i ♥ Betty la fea, which starred Bea Alonzo. He was included on a TV5 show, Lipgloss, where he played Kyle, the protagonist. During its second season, Concepcion left the show. He joined a group called GiggerBoys in ASAP together with Enchong Dee, Robi Domingo, the late AJ Perez, Arron Villaflor, Dino Imperial, and Chris Gutierrez. The group launched in acting when Concepcion played Bobet, the optimist of the group, in Your Song Presents: Boystown in 2009. Concepcion, together with 40 Star Magic artists, flew to the United States for the Star Magic World Concert Tour held in Ontario, Canada and San Francisco wherein he did a Michael Jackson-inspired number.

Concepcion staged his first major solo concert dubbed as I'll Find Your Heart held at the Music Museum in October 2008 that coincided with his 16th birthday. Later in the year, Concepcion held a free Christmas concert at the CCP open grounds. In May 2009, Concepcion held another concert entitled, I'll Find Your Heart: Part 2 held at the Crossroads77 Convenarium in Quezon City. September 2009 marked Concepcion's return to theater, reprising his role as The Narrator/God. Concepcion portrayed the young Noynoy Aquino in Maalaala Mo Kaya, which depicted the untold love story of the country's historic icons, Ninoy and Cory Aquino. In October 2009, Concepcion became Candy's Top Celeb Cutie for the fourth consecutive time. In November 2009, he was hailed by the Consumers League of the Philippines Foundation the Dangal ng Pilipinas for Best Promising Male Young Singer Performer award.

=== 2010–2011 ===
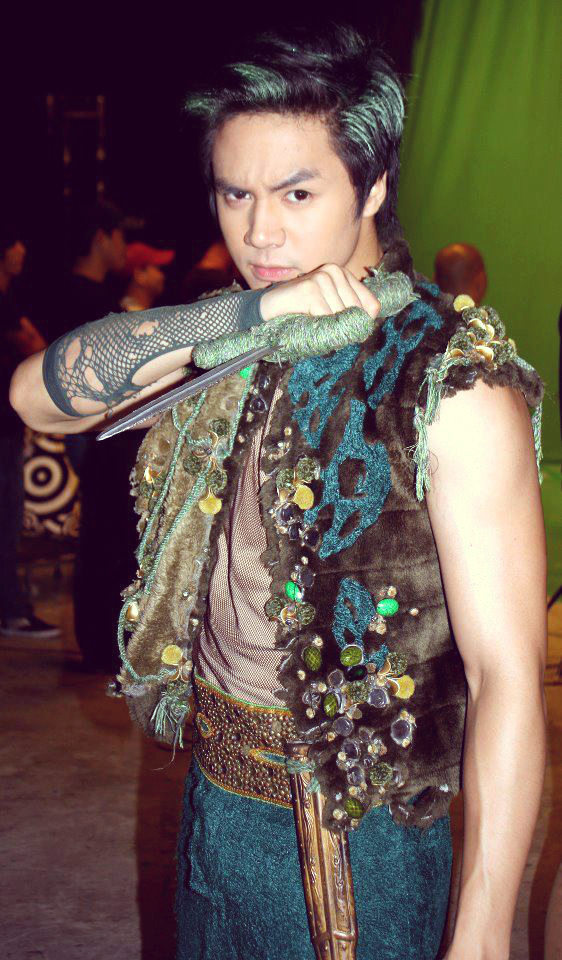
Sam Concepcion as Peter Pan, backstage of ASAP in 2011.

Concepcion released his second solo album in January 2010 entitled, Pop Class for Universal Records. Its concept was different from his first album, featuring a mini-musical movie compilation album similar to Glee and High School Musical. The album's single is an original, "Missed You".

In 2010, Concepcion became the youngest model to participate in the yearly fashion show of Bench, Bench Uncut 2010. Concepcion starred on the "Braso" (Arm) episode of a Star Cinema trilogy movie, Cinco. In 2011 he acted in the teen-oriented show Good Vibes, and family movie Way Back Home.

On February 19, 2011, he was the opening act for Taylor Swift's concert in Manila and sang his hits "Yeah2x", "Kung Fu Fighting", "Even If" and "Fireworks". On June 17 of the same year, he was joined by Elmo Magalona as the opening acts for Miley Cyrus's Manila concert. He became an endorser of My|Phone cellphone. Concepcion directed Tippy and Morisette's Face Off concert. He joined the Pilipinas, Tara Na! music video together with other Filipino artists to boost domestic tourism. In the same year, he became the cover model of Candy mini-magazine. He attended the first Candy press conference and Candy Fair 2011 and performed his latest single "Forever Young". During this time, he was dethroned as Hottest Candy Cutie by Enzo Pineda. He was featured in Sense and Style and Total Girl Philippines magazines. In 2011, Concepcion became one of World Vision's Yumbassadors of fast-food chain Jollibee. According to Jollibee, the nine Yumbassadors "...represent the best in every young Pinoy" and "...form a new breed of role models that the country can proudly present to the rest of the world.".

Concepcion celebrated his 10th anniversary in show business by starring as the lead character of Peter Pan in the musical version staged by Repertory Philippines and S.T.A.G.E.S at the Meralco Theater. This production was the first time that this version of Peter Pan, written by Stiles and Drewe and the late Willis Hall, was staged in Asia. He released his third studio album, Forever Young, under Universal Records. "Forever Young" became the single. The single stayed at No. 1 for seven consecutive weeks.

=== 2012–2016 ===
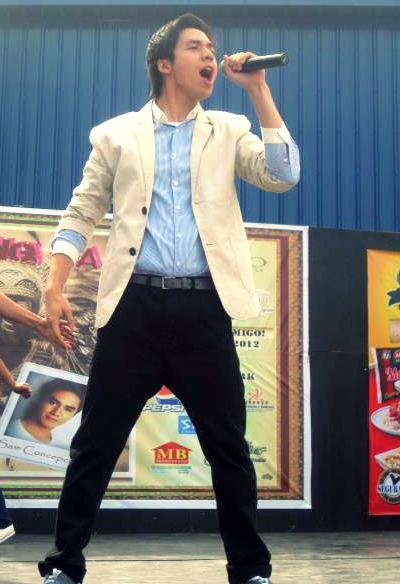
Concepcion performing at the 2012 Dinagyang Festival

Concepcion was chosen by composer Soc Villanueva to sing his composition "Kontrabida". From around 3,000 entries submitted to the first Philippine Popular Music Festival, 14 songs emerged on top including Concepcion's. The song was 2nd runner up to Karl Villuga's "Bawat Hakbang" and Toto Sorioso's "Tayo-tayo Lang". Villanueva stated, "I never doubted Sam's talent. Even before he stepped onstage, I knew he would give justice to the song." He added, "Sam's confidence is just so high and talent is overflowing that I know that the battle is already half-won."

In 2012, Concepcion took the lead role in the first Filipino musical-comedy film, I Do Bidoo Bidoo: Heto nAPO Sila!, after Peter Pan. In an interview with PEP, he stated that the film would be his biggest break. Concepcion was nominated at the 10th Golden Screen Awards for Movies for Best Performance by an Actor in a Lead Role-Musical or Comedy in 2013.

In July 2012, Concepcion was invited to Indonesia to appear on a morning variety show, Dahsyat Musik. He performed "Forever Young" and "Yeah 3x". This was the first time that he performed for Indonesians, and he became the top trending topic there. The same month, he released "Forever Young" in Indonesia. Following his appearance, Concepcion won "Most Awesome Guest" on Dahsyat Awards in 2013.

Concepcion's second full-length album, Infinite in 2013. The album celebrates his 10th anniversary in the music industry. He stated, "It's totally different from the way I used to sound. It's a new sound and a new look for me as a recording artist. That's one thing that my fans can look forward to." He added, "It's going to be new music for me, something that you haven't heard me do." The first single was "No Limitations", released as a digital download that became no. 1 for five consecutive weeks. Concepcion was chosen as one of the new VJs for Myx – the first year where Myx did not hold public auditions.

Concepcion appeared in the Mira Bella series in 2014. He released the "Teka Break" singlefrom his upcoming album.

=== 2017–present ===
In 2017, Concepcion signed with Viva Artist Agency (VAA) and Star Magic. He appeared in a minor role in Miss Granny in 2018. In 2019, he starred in Indak, a dance musical, his first movie with Viva film production. In the same year, he led a concert with Billy Crawford and James Reid named as "The Crew" (stylized as The CR3W). In 2019, Concepcion was to star in HBO Asia's Halfworlds. The production was put on hold and is still in post-production as of 2022.

In 2020, Trumpets' longest running musical Joseph The Dreamer was revived and Concepcion was chosen to star. It ran in early 2020. In July 2022, Joseph the Dreamer opened again at the Maybank Performing Arts Theater in Taguig City.

In 2021, he served as a judge in a singing competition in the Season 2 of TV5's Born to Be a Star. In October 2021, Concepcion released his single "Diwata", which was part of the soundtrack for Miss Universe Philippines 2021. He performed it for the first time during the live coronation. An accompanying music video and the single was later released. In 2022, Concepcion returned to the Miss Universe stage and launched his new single "Dalisay" which was used for the 2022 edition of the pageant.

== Philanthropy ==
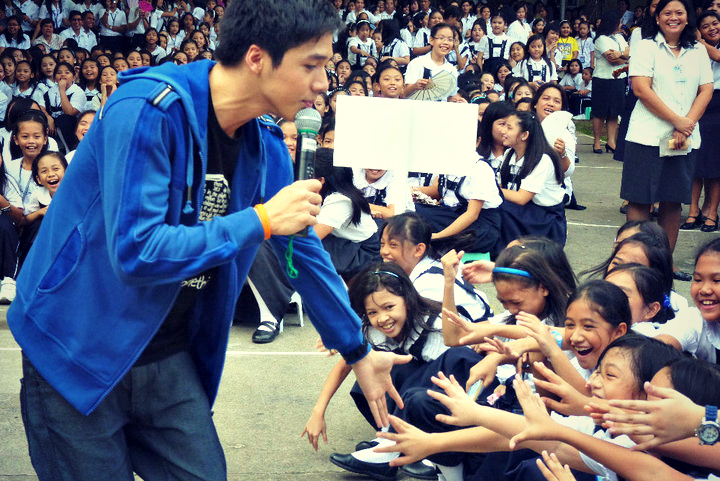
Sam Concepcion serenading the students of St. Scholastica, Manila for World Vision's "Youth Campaign Against Hunger" in 2011.

In October 2008, Concepcion was appointed by the Philippine Department of Education as the Youth Role Model and Spokesperson. As its Ambassador for Education, Concepcion joined a nationwide school tour, dubbed as, SAMa-SAMa sa Eskwela, that aimed to encourage students to prioritize their education. Former Education Secretary Jesli Lapus asked Concepcion to inspire young Filipinos to see how education can improve oneself. He stated, "We need somebody like Sam to remind the youth that education can be enjoyable and can bring us close to our dreams". Concepcion was a spokesperson for campaigns and advocated co-curricular concerns. He visited 50 schools and 100,000 students in the first month and traveled to places including Pampanga, Bohol, Laguna, Cebu City, Cagayan de Oro, and Davao City. He joined many government campaigns including Go Negosyo, and Anti-Smoking Campaign of the World Health Organization. He was one of the National Book Development Board's (NBDB) Get Caught Reading ambassadors in 2007.

Concepcion was appointed by the Business Software Alliance as the Official Spokesperson of the Philippines for B4USurf, an Asia-wide campaign that promoted safe internet use. Concepcion was the Youth Ambassador for Education and the Arts in the 3rd District of Manila during that time. For the campaign, he launched his PaperClay Art Competition at the Manila Ocean Park with a theme, Ako Para sa Kalikasan.

In 2008, Concepcion began advocating the rights and welfare of every Filipino child as World Vision's Ambassador for Children. He visited poor municipalities and provinces in the Philippines to encourage everyone to share their blessings, so poor Filipino families could experience the joy of Christmas through World Vision's Noche Buena Gift. In early 2009, he visited Palawan, particularly far-flung areas to see the lives of Filipino children. Concepcion was appointed as Youth Ambassador for Education and the Arts in the 3rd District of Manila wherein he launched his PaperClay Art Competition at the Manila Ocean Park with the theme, Ako Para sa Kalikasan. He believes that PaperClay art is a great tool for exercising the creativity of students. In May 2009, Concepcion held another major concert entitled, I'll Find Your Heart: Part 2. This concert helped raise funds for Aim Christian Learning Center. When the Philippines was hit by Typhoon Ondoy, Concepcion along with other celebrities helped distribute relief goods to the isolated families in evacuation centers in Metro Manila. In Marikina, which was the mostly affected by the typhoon, Concepcion gathered all the children to encourage positivity.

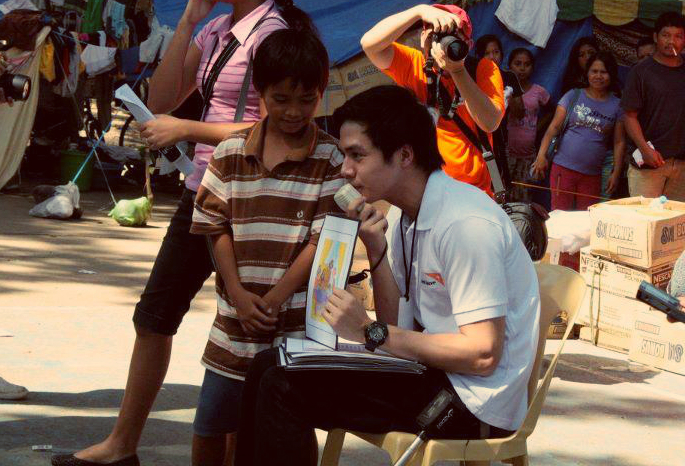
Sam Concepcion on his lecture for World Vision's "Youth Campaign Against Hunger" in 2012 in Cagayan de Oro.

In December 2011, Concepcion and Star Magic artists, led by Piolo Pascual held a one-night concert dubbed as A Night to Give Back at Zirkoh Morato, benefitting handicapped and disadvantaged children. The proceeds were donated to Elsie Gaches, Reception and Study Center for Children, Sanctuary Center and Sagip Kapamilya. On December 29, 2011, Concepcion was joined by co-ambassador Tippy Dos Santos as part of the "Child Friendly Space (CFS)" in the Macasandig, (Cagayan de Oro) evacuation center to aid relief efforts for the victims of Typhoon Sendong. The two visited some of the hardest-hit areas in Tibasak and Sitio Cala-Cala to listen and bond with survivor families.

On September 30, 2012, Concepcion joined the campaign against world hunger taglined as Your Hunger can Feed a Child.

In 2013, Concepcion performed at the annual MYX! Mo, 2013 concert, with proceeds going to the victims of Typhoon Haiyan (Yolanda), the Philippines' strongest typhoon ever recorded.

== Discography ==
Studio albums

- Sam Concepcion (2007)
- Infinite (2013)
- Bago (2016)

Extended plays

- I'll Find Your Heart (Music+Videos) (2008)
- Forever Young (2011)

Concert/Tours

Year	Title	Venue	Notes	Ref.
2019	The Cr3w	Smart Araneta Coliseum	with James Reid & Billy Crawford	

== Filmography ==
=== Film ===
Year	Title	Role	Ref.
2006	Miko	Miko Romualdez	
2007	Shake, Rattle & Roll 9	Paeng	
2010	Cinco	Ivan	
2010	Pinoy Scout	Lester	
2011	Way Back Home	AJ Delgado	
2011	Shake, Rattle & Roll 13	Bryan	
2012	I Do Bidoo Bidoo: Heto nAPO Sila!	Rock Polotan	
2013	Kimmy Dora: Ang Kiyemeng Prequel	Cameo	
2015	Makata (Poet)	Kiko	
2015	Etiquette for Mistresses	The Young Guy	
2018	Para Sa Broken Hearted	Alex	
2018	Miss Granny	Young Bert	
2019	Indak	Vin	
2023	Martyr or Murderer	Noynoy Aquino	

=== Television ===
Year	Title	Role	Notes	Ref.
2004	Whacked	Himself		
2005	A.S.T.I.G – All Set To Imitate God	Himself		
2005	ASAP Fanatic	Himself		
2005	Mga Anghel na Walang Langit	Gary		
2005	Little Big Star	Himself	Grand Winner	
2006	Little Big Star Season 2	Himself		
2006	Your Song: Let It Snow	Nick		
2006–present	ASAP XP	Himself		
2006	Super Inggo	Boy Bawang		
2007	Little Big Superstar	Himself		
2007	Walang Kapalit	Young Noel		
2007	Beck	Koyuki (voice)		
2007	Your Song: Even If	Ace		
2007	Your Song: Santa Clause	Nick		
2008	Lipgloss	Kyle Ponce		
2009	i ♥ Betty la fea	Andrew Pengson/Tingson		
2009	Your Song Presents: Boystown	Bobet		
2009	Your Song : You Know It's Christmas	Nick		
2010	Maalaala Mo Kaya: Kalapati	young Noynoy Aquino		
2010	Maalaala Mo Kaya: Makinilya	young Noynoy Aquino		
2010	Myx Music Awards 2010	Himself		
2010	Shout Out!	Himself		
2011	Maalaala Mo Kaya: Tropeo	Old Jun		
2011	Good Vibes	Marc Pedroza		
2011	Angelito: Batang Ama	Migoy Abella		
2012	Angelito: Ang Bagong Yugto	Migoy Abella		
2013	Minute To Win It	Himself	Guest Player	
2013	Maalaala Mo Kaya: Letter	Lino Cayetano		
2013	MYX Daily Top 10 (Wednesdays); MYX Take 5 Pop MYX; Pinoy MYX; My MYX	Myx VJ		
2013	The Ryzza Mae Show	Himself	Guest	
2013	Maalaala Mo Kaya: Medalya	Carlos		
2014	Maalaala Mo Kaya: Itak	Tirso		
2014	Mirabella	Terrence Laurel		
2014	Maalaala Mo Kaya: Panyo	Rope		
2014	Wattpad Presents: My Tag Boyfriend	Kaizer Buenavista		
2014	Ipaglaban Mo: Hustisya Para Sa'yo, Anak	Carlo		
2015	Maalaala Mo Kaya: Ilog	Aries		
2015	Your Face Sounds Familiar Season 2	Himself	Third place	
2015	You're My Home	Ram Fontanilla		
2019	Will You Marry Me	Atty. Xavier San Diego	Sari Sari Original	
2019	The Killer Bride	Mayor Luis Dela Torre		
2020	Halfworlds		Season 3 (Announced)	
2021	Born to Be a Star	Himself / Judge		
2022–2025	All-Out Sundays	Himself / Guest Performer		
2025	Beauty Empire	Miguel "Migoy" Acero		
2025	Beyond 75: The GMA 75th Anniversary Special	Himself / Performer		

=== Theater ===
Year	Title	Role	Venue	Ref.
2002	Sino Ka Ba Jose Rizal?	young Jose Rizal		
2002	First Name	Noah		
2002	The Lion, The Witch and The Wardrobe	Edmund Pevensie		
2003	Song of Mulan	Mushu		
2004	Mr. Noah's Big Boat	voice of Japeth (Noah's son)		
2004	Ryan Cayabyab: The Musicman at 50	young Ryan Cayabyab	CCP Main Theatre	
2004	Peter Pan and the Time Machine	Wendell		
2004	Ragnarok	Prince		
2006	Philstar Event	Paperboy		
2007	High School Musical on Stage	Troy Bolton	Meralco Theater	
2009	N.O.A.H	Narrator/God		
2011	Peter Pan	Peter Pan	Meralco Theater	
2020	Joseph the Dreamer	Joseph	Maybank Performing Arts Theater	
2024	One More Chance: The Musical	Popoy (alternate with CJ Navato)	Philippine Educational Theater Association	

== Accolades ==
Awards and NominationsAwards and nominations received by Sam Concepcion
Award	Year	Category	Nominated work	Result	Ref.
Aliw Awards	2005	Best Child Performer	—N/a	Nominated	
Aliw Awards	2006	Best New Male Artist	—N/a	Nominated	
Aliw Awards	2007	Best Stage Actor in a Musical		Nominated	
Aliw Awards	2022	Best Lead Actor in a Musical	Joseph The Dreamer	Nominated	
Awit Awards	2013	Best Performance by a Male Recording Artist	"Kontrabida"	Nominated	
Awit Awards	2014	Best Performance by a Male Recording Artist	"No Limitations"	Nominated	
Awit Awards	2014	Best Dance Recording	"No Limitations"	Won	
Awit Awards	2014	Best R&B Recording	"I'm the One"	Nominated	
Awit Awards	2014	Best R&B Recording	"Dati"	Nominated	
Awit Awards	2018	Best Dance Recording	"Phone Down"	Nominated	
Awit Awards	2019	Best Dance Recording	"Sarung Banggi"	Won	
Awit Awards	2020	Best Lead Actor in a Musical	Joseph The Dreamer	Nominated	
Awit Awards	2021	Best Global Recording	"Rise"	Won	
Awit Awards	2022	Best Pop Recording	"Diwata"	Nominated	
Awit Awards	2022	Favorite Song	"Diwata"	Nominated	
CandyRap Awards	2006	Favorite Teen Star	—N/a	Won	
CREBA	2006	Filipino World Champion Artist Award	—N/a	Won	
Dangal ng Pilipinas Award	2009	Best Promising Male Young Singer Performer	—N/a	Won	
Dahsyatnya Awards	2013	Most Awesome Guest Star	—N/a	Won	
Entertainment Konek	2005	Male Crush ng Bayan	—N/a	Won	
FAMAS Awards	2011	German Moreno Youth Achievement Award	—N/a	Won	
Gawad Buhay Awards	2011	Male Lead in a Musical	Peter Pan, a Musical Adventure	Nominated	
Gawad Buhay Awards	2023	Male Lead in a Musical	Joseph The Dreamer	Nominated	
Gawad Buhay Awards	2025	Male Lead in a Musical	One More Chance	Nominated	
Gawad PASADO Awards	2008	PinakaPASADOng Kabataan (shared with (Shaina Magdayao)	—N/a	Won	
German Moreno Special citation	2007	Vaudeville Award	—N/a	Won	
Golden Screen Awards	2013	Best Performance by an Actor in a Lead Role-Musical or Comedy	I Do Bidoo Bidoo	Nominated	
K-Zone Awards	2006	Favorite Male Singer of the Year	—N/a	Won	
Metro Manila Film Festival	2007	Best Supporting Actor	Shake, Rattle & Roll 9	Nominated	
MYX Music Awards	2008	Favorite New Artist	—N/a	Won	
MYX Music Awards	2009	Favorite MYX Celebrity VJ	—N/a	Nominated	
MYX Music Awards	2009	Favorite Media Soundtrack	Kung Fu Fighting	Nominated	
MYX Music Awards	2012	Favorite Male Artist	—N/a	Nominated	
MYX Music Awards	2012	Favorite Remake	"Forever Young"	Nominated	
MYX Music Awards	2012	Favorite MYX Celebrity VJ	—N/a	Nominated	
MYX Music Awards	2014	Favorite Male Artist	—N/a	Nominated	
MYX Music Awards	2014	Favorite Remake	"Mahal na Mahal"	Nominated	
MYX Music Awards	2014	Favorite Collaboration	"Dati"	Nominated	
MYX Music Awards	2016	Best Music Video	"Teka Break"	Nominated	
MYX Music Awards	2016	Favorite Song	"Teka Break"	Nominated	
Nickelodeon Kids' Choice Awards	2006	Pinoy Wannabe	—N/a	Won	
PMPC Star Awards for Movies	2011	New Movie Actor of the Year	Cinco	Nominated	
PMPC Star Awards for Music	2016	Music Video of the Year	"Kalsada"	Nominated	
PMPC Star Awards for Music	2016	Best Collaboration	"Dati"	Nominated	
PMPC Star Awards for Music	2016	Male Pop Artist of the Year	"Bago"	Nominated	
PMPC Star Awards for Music	2016	Dance Album of the Year	"Bago"	Nominated	
PMPC Star Awards for Music	2022	Male Pop Artist of the Year	"Loved You Better"	Won	
PMPC Star Awards for Music	2022	Male R&B Artist of the Year	"Thrill of It"	Nominated	
PMPC Star Awards for TV	2007	Best Public Affairs Program Host	Y Speak	Nominated	
Pure & Fresh Top Teens Awards	2009	Top Teen Male Entertainer	—N/a	Won	
United Nations Youth Association of the Philippines	2009	UNAP Outstanding Youth Leader	—N/a	Honored	
Yes! Philippines Award	2006	Next Male Superstar	—N/a	Nominated	
