= Philippine Educational Theater Association =

Arts center in Metro Manila, Philippines

- Logo of PETA
- Nickname: PETA
- Formation: April 7, 1967; 59 years ago
- Founder: Cecile Guidote-Alvarez
- Type: Private
- Headquarters: PETA Theater Center, New Manila, Quezon City, Philippines
- Chairperson: Noel Kintanar
- President: Melvin Lee (2025–present)
- Affiliations: International Theater Institute
- Website: petatheater.com

The Philippine Educational Theater Association (PETA) is a theatrical association of artists and educators. It is the UNESCO-International Theater Institute Center in the Philippines. It is a non-profit, non-stock, non-governmental, and a registered donee institution. It was awarded the Ramon Magsaysay Award in 2017.

== History ==
On April 7, 1967, Cecile Guidote-Alvarez established the Philippine Educational Theater Association (PETA) who meant the organization to be a vehicle for Philippine Theater to play a role in the development of the country's people and society. Four years later in 1971, PETA was named the UNESCO-International Theater Institute Center in the Philippines. In the same year, coinciding with the 400th foundation anniversary of Manila, PETA organized the first Third World Theater Festival.

Martial law in the Philippines forced founder Guidote-Alvarez to go to a political exile in 1972 but the theatrical organization remains operational. The theatrical works of the organization revolved around the social conditions and political climate during the Martial law era and focused on using the medium of theater as an empowerment for the marginalized sectors.

For the last 50 years, PETA has remained operational and has continued producing works and training theater practitioners.

=== One More Chance, The Musical ===
On April 12, 2024, Robinsons Malls and PETA presented One More Chance, The Musical, the theatrical adaptation of One More Chance using the Ben&Ben song.

== Theater center ==
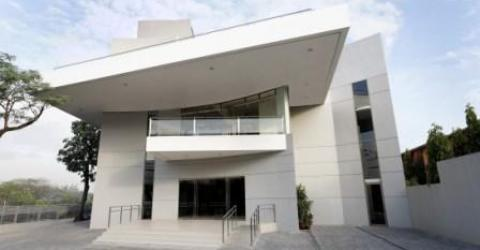
Photo of the PETA Theater Center

PETA transferred to a permanent building as its headquarters in 2005, which is named the PETA Theater Center. Since the move, PETA has produced and performed adaptations of classic foreign plays as well as local and children's theatrical productions. They also began to adopt modern pop music. It is now located in Eymard Drive, New Manila, Quezon City, Metro Manila.

A multi-function hall on their building's second floor is dedicated to film director and Filipino national artist Lino Brocka. Before becoming a film director, the young Brocka had worked with PETA as Guidote-Alvarez's assistant, stage actor, and PETA executive director.

At the heart of the center is called black box which covers from the ground up to the third floor. It is also called as PETA-PHINMA Theater. At the ground floor, it also houses The PLDT/SMART Exhibition Hall which is an interior design language that resonates throughout the building. On the second floor, it houses The LINO BROCKA Hall, a special hall dedicated in memory of the National Artist for film Lino Brocka along with a resource center which houses the library and archives covering a collection of books, publications, scripts, audiovisual files, and chronicles of the continuing lifework of the theater.

It also has two studios which are designed for creative learning spaces.

== See also ==
- Repertory Philippines
