= Forever Young (EP) =

EP by Sam Concepcion
- Released: September 2011
- Genre: Pop, teen pop, dance-pop,
- Length: 22:59
- Label: Universal Records
- Producer: Ito Rapadas, Kathleen Dy Go (Executive)

Sam Concepcion chronology
Pop Class (2010)	Forever Young (2011)	Infinite (2013)

Singles from Forever Young
- 1. "Missed You" Released: February 7, 2010; 2. "Forever Young" Released: September 18, 2011

Music video
- "Forever Young" on YouTube

Forever Young is the first mini album released by Sam Concepcion in commemoration of his 10th anniversary in the show business industry. It was released in September 2011 under Universal Records.

== Background and release ==
On April 30, 2011, Sam Concepcion was cast as the lead star of STAGES and Repertory Philippines’ production of Peter Pan that started its theatrical run from September 29 to October 30 at the Meralco Theater.

On September 15, Universal Records uploaded an audio sampler of Concepcion's newest single "Forever Young". The single was also the promotional single of "Peter Pan". It was then revealed that the new mini-album would contain the tracks from his previous mini-movie musical album Pop Class. Concepcion dropped the mini-album in late September.

== Promotion ==
Concepcion launched "Forever Young" on Asap Rocks on September 18, 2011. The song instantly enjoyed massive support from the fans who made Concepcion and "Forever Young" two of the top trending topics on Twitter. Concepcion also attend series of mall shows to promote his new mini-album.

== Music video ==
The music video for the title track was uploaded through YouTube the same day he launched his mini-album on Asap Rocks.

== Track listing ==
CD
No.	Title	Lyrics	Length
1.	"Forever Young"	Marian Gold, Bernhard Lloyd, Frank Merterns (Additional new lyrics by Ito Rapadas)	4:13
2.	"Missed You"	Nathaniel Joseph De Mesa	4:10
3.	"Hala Heyla Hey"	Nathaniel Joseph De Mesa	3:49
4.	"Dream On"	Nathaniel Joseph De Mesa	4:05
5.	"Be My Girlfriend" (Originally by US5)	Ulrich Willigerodt, Samer Naja, Mark Breslav; Jay Khan	3:23
6.	"Someone"	Florian Prengel	3:23
Total length:			22:59

== Release history ==
Region	Date	Format	Labels
Philippines	September 2011	CD	Universal Records
Worldwide	October 10, 2011	Digital download	Universal Records
