= MyMusicStore =

Online music store in the Philippines

- Launch date: January 18, 2012
- Pricing model: ₱20 to ₱35 (per song) ₱150 to ₱400 (per album)
- Availability: International
- Website: www.mymusicstore.com.ph

MyMusicStore is the first online music store in the Philippines operated by MobileCash, Inc. and Rising Tide Mobile Entertainment Inc. It is supported by the Philippine Association of the Record Industry (PARI), the trade organization of the recording industry in the Philippines. Aside from Original Pilipino Music (OPM), the site also offers foreign songs.

== History ==
MyMusicStore was launched on January 18, 2012, at the Robot Restaurant and Lounge in Makati Avenue with live performances from the country's top music artists – Pupil, Bamboo and Gary Valenciano, and others. It was created as a joint project between John Alonte, CEO of Rising Tide Mobile Entertainment and Eliza Tan, CEO of Mobile Cash.

On May 12, 2016, MyMusicStore announced on Facebook that they would be shutting down.

=== Piracy ===
With the support of the Philippine Association of the Record Industry (PARI), MyMusicStore endorsed responsible downloading of music to combat piracy and to continuously promote and enliven the local music industry.

== Partners ==
Aside from PARI, the store have many partners which are:

- Alpha Music
- EMI
- Galaxy Records
- GMA Records
- House of Praise
- House of Tunes
- Indie Pinoy
- Ivory Music & Video
- MCA Music
- Music Copyright Administrators of the Philippines
- The Philippine Star
- PolyEast Records
- Sony Music
- Soupstar Entertainment
- Star Records
- Universal Records
- Viva Records
- Vicor Music

== See also ==
- Music of the Philippines
