= Allied logistics in the Southern France campaign =

1944 logistics plan during World War II

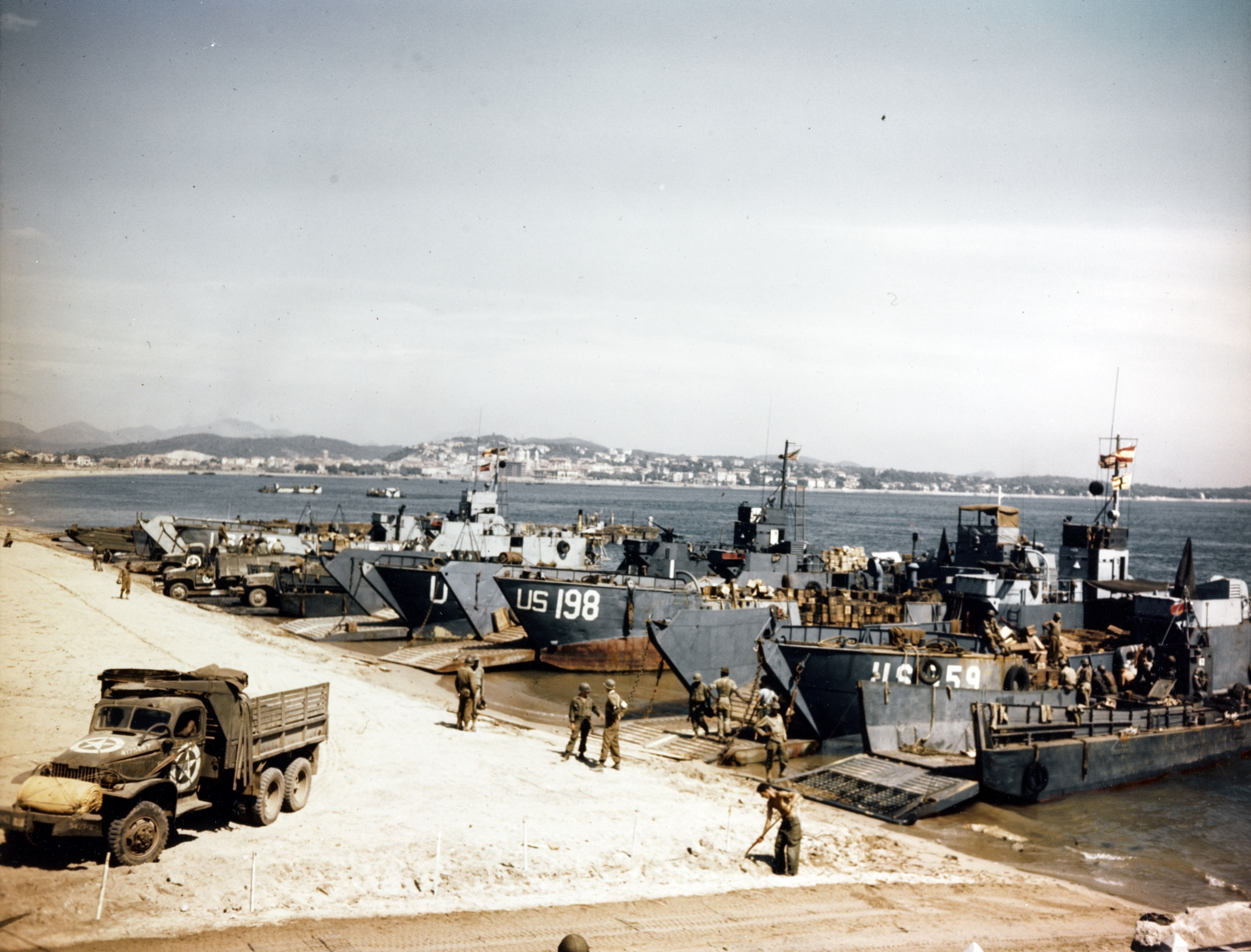
LCTs and LCMs land supplies on the beach west of Saint-Raphaël on 20 August 1944. Matted ramp in foreground is for DUKWs.

Logistics played a key role in the success of Operation Dragoon, the Allied invasion of Southern France during World War II that commenced with the US Seventh Army landings on the French Riviera on 15 August 1944. On 12 September, the Seventh Army made contact with Allied forces that had landed in Normandy earlier that year as part of Operation Overlord. The supporting logistical organizations continued to operate separately, with the Southern Line of Communications supporting the Seventh Army drawing its supplies from the North African Theater of Operations until it merged with the Communications Zone of the European Theater of Operations on 20 November.

The primary objective of the campaign was to capture the ports of Marseille and Toulon, preceding a drive northward up the Rhone valley to connect with Allied forces from Normandy. Both ports were captured, but they had been badly damaged by German demolitions and Allied bombing, so considerable effort was required to bring them into service. The unexpectedly rapid Allied advance was the principal cause of logistical problems, although a theater-wide shortage of service units and an unanticipated dearth of French civilian labor also contributed.

Operations in southern France gave French troops a chance to assist in the liberation of their country, but the French units also created an additional logistical burden because they lacked the service troops required to provide their support. These logistical constraints prevented the operational commanders from taking full advantage of the opportunities offered by the German retreat. To facilitate the advance, engineers repaired bridges, rehabilitated railways, and laid pipelines.

The logistics plan gave priority to ammunition during combat loading, in the expectation that the Germans would stubbornly resist the invasion. When this proved to not be the case, the ammunition in the assault and follow-up convoys had to be moved out of the way to reach other materiel, which slowed unloading. Efforts to alter the shipping schedules met with mixed success. The operations of the Seventh Army were hampered by these logistical constraints. Many soldiers had to subsist on K-rations for extended periods, because fresh meat and produce were unavailable in the first month of the campaign due to a lack of refrigerator cars and trucks.

Southern France did not produce sufficient food to feed itself, and food supplies for the civilian population had to be given additional priority. As the weather deteriorated in September, the advance slowed, and there was a rush to equip the soldiers with winter clothing. The October battles demonstrated that the German capacity for hard fighting had not been overestimated, and critical shortages of ammunition occurred.

== Background ==
A direct Allied invasion of southern France was considered at the Trident Conference in May 1943, but it was regarded as too risky and was passed over in favor of an Allied invasion of Italy. Nonetheless, the American Joint Chiefs of Staff continued to consider the operation, as resources had accumulated in the North African Theater of Operations (NATOUSA), including a large French Army that was being raised and equipped in North Africa. Not all of these resources were required for operations in the Mediterranean, but shipping was scarce, and the resources needed for Operation Overlord, the Allied invasion of Normandy, were often more easily moved from the United States to the United Kingdom than from North Africa to the United Kingdom.

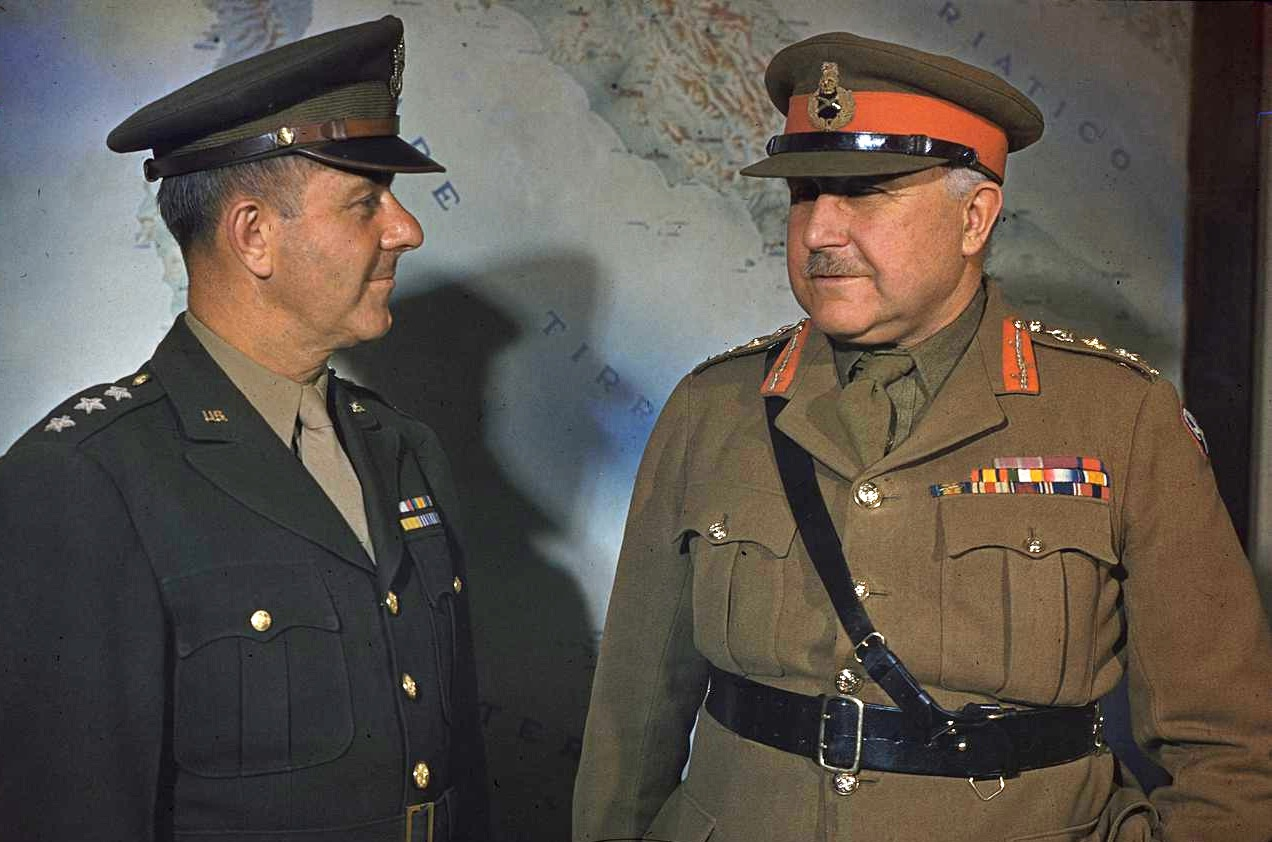
British General Sir Henry Maitland Wilson (right), the Supreme Allied Commander, Mediterranean Theatre, with his American deputy, Lieutenant General Jacob L. Devers

Plans for Overlord called for a concurrent diversionary effort against southern France, which was codenamed Operation Anvil. Anvil's objectives were the seizure of the ports of Marseille and Toulon, followed by a drive northward up the Rhone valley to link up with the Overlord forces. At the Tehran Conference in November 1943, the Premier of the Soviet Union, Joseph Stalin, came out in favor of operations in southern France. The Combined Chiefs of Staff therefore adopted a resolution to "launch Overlord during May, in conjunction with a supporting operation against the south of France on the largest scale that is permitted by the landing craft available at that time."

Another consequence of the Tehran Conference was the appointment of General Dwight D. Eisenhower to command Overlord. On 8 January 1944, he handed over command in the Mediterranean to British General Sir Henry Maitland Wilson. To give Wilson the forces he needed to capture Rome, the British and American chiefs agreed to retain troops in Italy and postpone Anvil to 10 July. Additional assault shipping Eisenhower required for Overlord was sent from the Mediterranean. The Joint Chiefs of Staff decided to take 26 Landing Ships, Tank (LSTs) and 40 landing craft required for Anvil from the American-led Pacific theater. This was the first time that assault shipping would actually be withdrawn from the Pacific, as opposed to merely diverted, but this offer was contingent on Anvil going ahead on 10 July, so the British Chiefs of Staff turned the offer down.

In April, the British chiefs suddenly announced that they were in favor of Anvil after all, to which the Commander-in-Chief, United States Fleet, Admiral Ernest J. King replied that the offer to withdraw ships from the Pacific was still good. When the Combined Chiefs of Staff next met in London in mid-June, Eisenhower supported a three-division Anvil – which he saw not only as providing more troops, but as the best way to capture a major port quickly – something Overlord had not yet been able to accomplish. Wilson recommended a landing on the Istrian peninsula instead, and Prime Minister Winston Churchill suggested an operation to capture the Brittany ports. Churchill appealed to President Franklin D. Roosevelt to cancel Anvil, but to no avail. On 2 July, Wilson was ordered to launch Anvil as a three-division assault by 15 August. The required assault shipping came from what remained in the Mediterranean, augmented by ships from the Pacific, and some released by Eisenhower. The Combined Chiefs of Staff changed the operation's codename to Dragoon on 1 August.

== Planning ==
In January 1944, a planning staff known as Force 163 was formed in Palermo under the US Seventh Army's Chief Engineer, Brigadier General Garrison H. Davidson. Force 163 moved to Algiers, near Wilson's Allied Force Headquarters (AFHQ), where it began working on Anvil. Force 163 rejected the first proposed landing site near Hyères, as it was dominated by German guns on the Cap Benat and Giens Peninsulas and the Hyères Islands, as well as within range of the heavy guns protecting the Toulon naval base. The islands also obstructed the approaches to the beaches and the restricted areas where the minesweepers and bombardment ships had to operate. The planners therefore looked further afield, to a series of beaches around Cavalaire-sur-Mer, Saint-Tropez and Saint-Raphaël. These beaches were far from perfect, being separated by cliffs and rock outcrops, backed by dominating high ground, and possessing only restricted entries and exits.

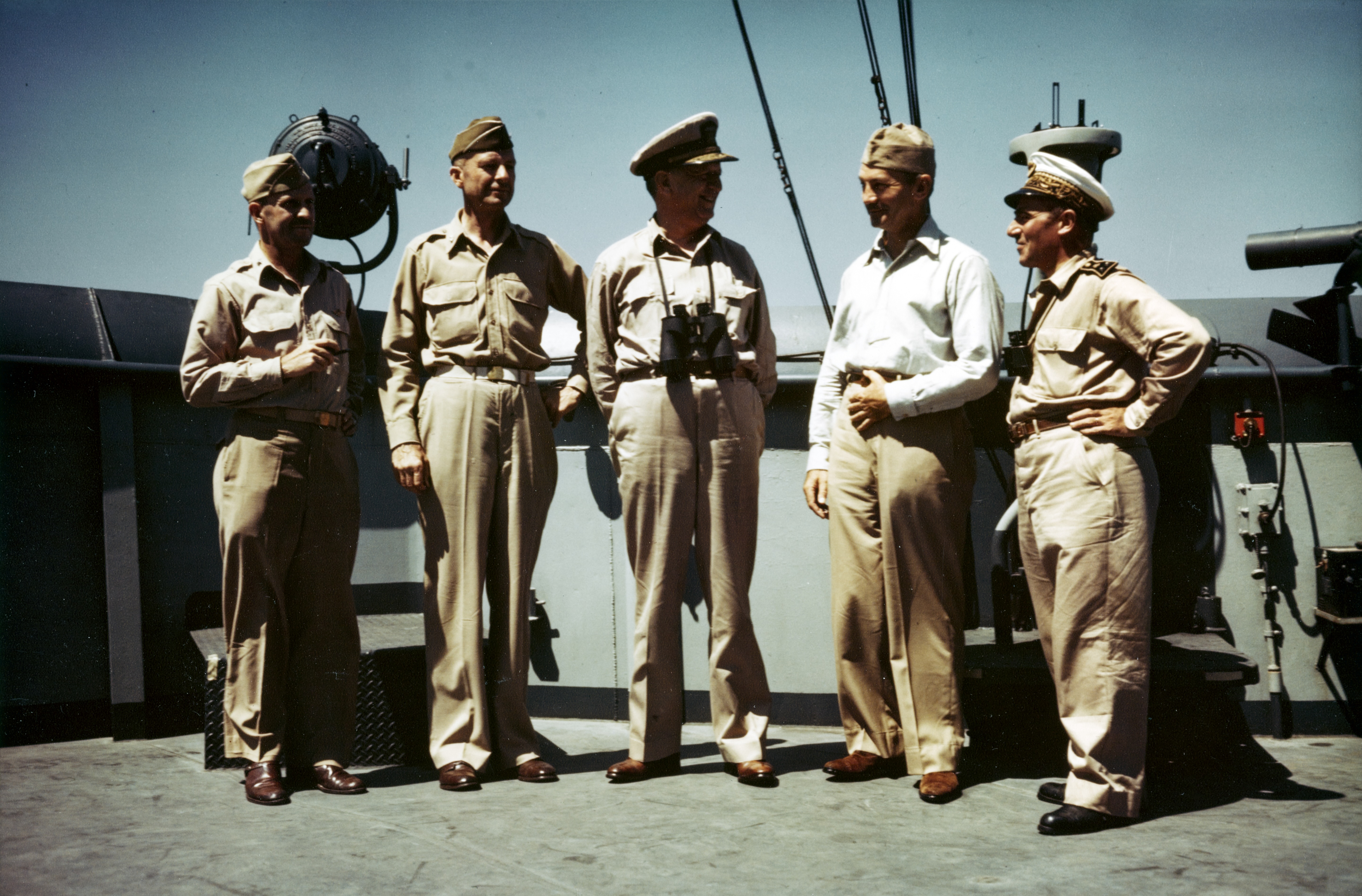
Senior officers aboard USS Catoctin (AGC-5), operation flagship, en route to the invasion area on 14 August 1944. Left to right: Brigadier General Gordon P. Saville, Air Commander; Lieutenant General Alexander Patch, Army Commander; Vice Admiral Kent Hewitt, Naval Commander; James Forrestal, Secretary of the Navy; Rear Admiral André Lemonnier, Chief of Staff of the French Navy.

Force 163's planning effort was hampered by the on-again, off-again nature of Anvil. There was uncertainty about the target date, and whether it would be a one-, two- or three-division operation. The departure of Lieutenant General George S. Patton for the United Kingdom along with key members of the staff left numerous unfilled positions at Seventh Army headquarters. This was remedied in March 1944 with the arrival of Lieutenant General Alexander Patch, who brought in members of the headquarters his former command, IV Corps, in to fill the vacancies. The Seventh Army and Vice Admiral Henry Kent Hewitt's Eighth Fleet headquarters moved to Naples on 8 July. Most of the Force 163 planners traveled on Hewitt's flagship, USS Catoctin, so they could continue working during the voyage. On arrival, Force 163 was discontinued and Seventh Army officially took over planning. With the VI Corps and the XII Tactical Air Command headquarters also located in the Naples area, all the important headquarters were now located there, greatly facilitating planning.

Working from a December 1943 plan, Services of Supply (SOS) NATOUSA began placing supply requisitions for Anvil with the New York Port of Embarkation (POE) in January 1944. Starting in February, convoys sailing for the Mediterranean were partially loaded with Anvil supplies using a procedure known as "flatting". Cargo was placed in a ship's hold and then boarded over. The ships then carried cargo for other purposes above board and on their weather decks. The cancellation of Anvil in April left 64 ships in the Mediterranean with half their cargo capacity taken up with flatted Anvil supplies. Over the next few months, General Jacob L. Devers, the commander of NATOUSA, and Major General Thomas B. Larkin, the commander of SOS NATOUSA, protected the supplies, both afloat and ashore, that had been stockpiled for Anvil against being diverted to the Italian campaign. As a result, when Anvil was revived in June, 75 percent of the required supplies for a two-division assault were on hand, although there were critical shortages of engineer, signals and transportation equipment. A convoy carrying Anvil supplies departed New York on 1 July. When it arrived on 15 July, SOS NATOUSA calculated that all the supplies required for Anvil up to D plus 90 (ninety days after the landing date) were on hand or en route.

Devers's decision to protect the supplies that had been assembled for Anvil had a second beneficial effect. The Anvil planners had estimated that, in addition to the ships required to support the Italian campaign, Anvil would require another 100 cargo ships to carry supplies for the assault, and 200 more sailings by D plus 90. The 64 ships with flatted Anvil cargo constituted the first instalment of additional shipping. Another 135 vessels arrived from the United States in convoys in June and July. AFHQ rounded up the remainder from ships already in the theater and from British sources. There was also a deficit of 65 LSTs. King promised 28 more, and Eisenhower another 24, still leaving Anvil 13 LSTs short. Based on an assumption that German air and naval activity would be weak, the planners decided to include the 64 flatted cargo ships in the assault convoy.

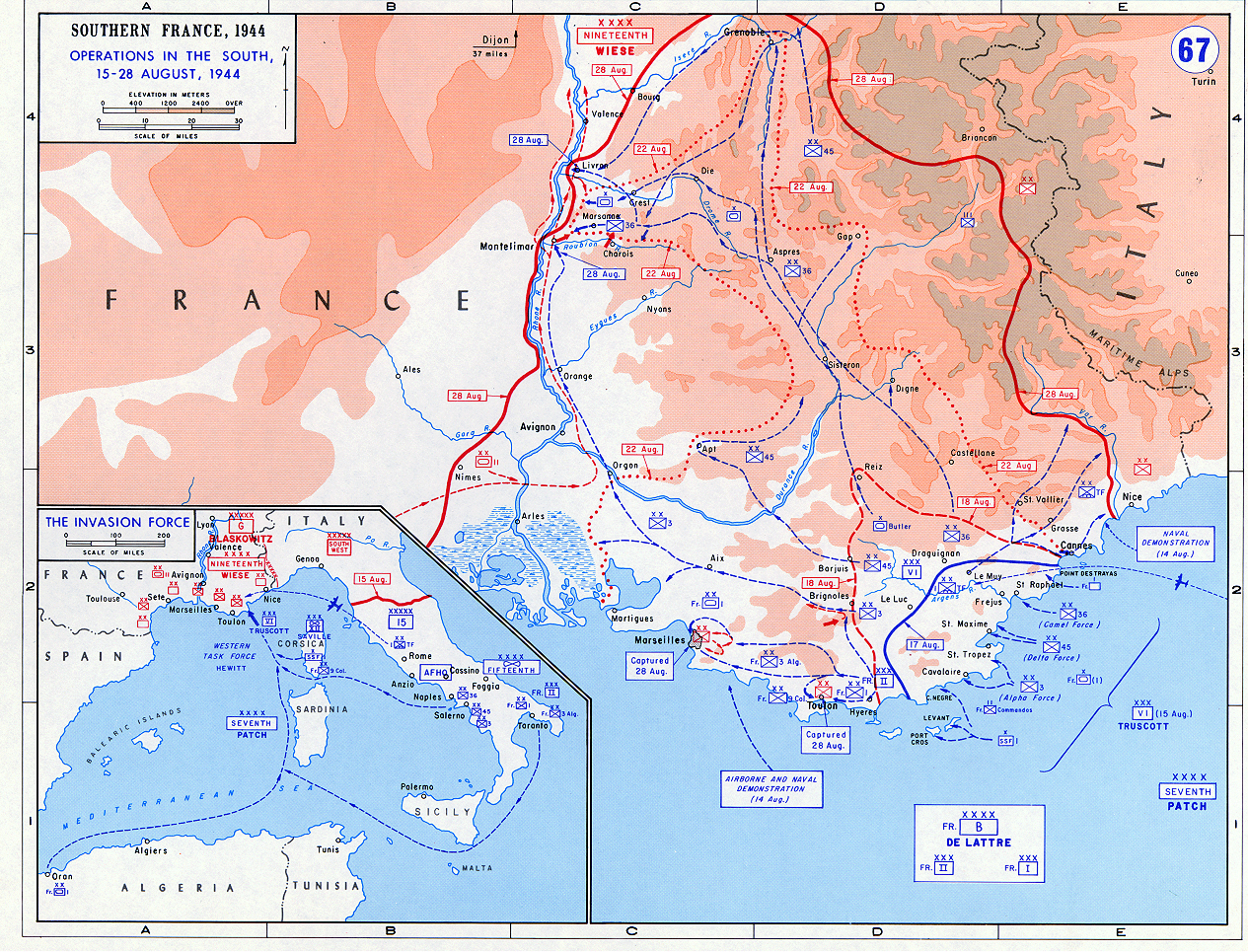
Operations in southern France

SOS NATOUSA created the Northern Base Section under the command of Colonel John P. Ratay in Corsica on 1 January 1944. Its initial assignment was to support air operations on the island, but it also became engaged in staging troops and loading supplies for Anvil. Most of the air units operating in support of Anvil would be based on Corsica, which had been in Allied hands since October 1943. The island had some disadvantages; malaria was endemic, and the transportation and communications infrastructure was underdeveloped. The best port was Bastia on the east coast. Engineers constructed and improved the roads, bridges and airfields, and signal units laid 2,500 miles (4,000 km) of telephone lines. By mid-June, 136,000 bombs, 3.5 million rounds of ammunition and 2,500 drop tanks were present on the island.

The 21st Port was activated in Algiers by SOS NATOUSA on 25 June as a logistical planning unit for Anvil. It was followed by the Coastal Base Section (CBS), which was activated in Naples on 7 July under the command of Major General Arthur R. Wilson, formerly the commander of the Peninsula Base Section. Initially the headquarters was located at 370 Via dei Tribunali, Naples, but it moved to the Provincia Building in Piazzetta Duca d'Aosta next to the headquarters of the Peninsula Base Section. By 1 August, 162 personnel were assigned to CBS headquarters and 532 to the 21st Port, although some were still serving with their former units.

Plans for Anvil called for landing 151,151 personnel and 19,271 vehicles on the first day. In the first 45 days, 478,931 personnel and 74,386 vehicles would be landed. Some 72,410 personnel were assigned to the CBS. Of these, 43,406 would come from North Africa, 24,015 from Italy and 4,989 from Corsica; 55,772 would be American and 16,638 French. In addition to the Allied troops, around 20,000 Italian prisoners of war (POWs) would arrive in southern France by the end of September. They were organized into Italian Service Units of 250 men and commanded by Italian officers and noncommissioned officers. Unreliable elements were supposed to be screened out, but in the rush to form the units, this was often ignored. All American service units were inspected by 6 September, and none needed to be relieved from their assignment to Dragoon.

The logistics plan provided for delivery of five days' supply of petrol, oil and lubricants (POL) and subsistence every three days, thus building up reserves by two days every three. The troops would land with five units of fire of ammunition. A unit of fire was a somewhat arbitrary measurement for accounting purposes, and was different for each type of ammunition. It was 60 rounds for the M1 carbine, 150 for the M1 Garand rifle, 750 for the M1918 Browning Automatic Rifle (BAR) and 900 for the M1919 Browning machine gun. Each day five units of fire would arrive with the troops landing that day, plus 1 2/3 or 3 1/3 additional units of fire to maintain those already ashore, alternating on successive convoys.

== Base 901 ==
The United States had undertaken to re-equip French Army units in North Africa under what was known as the Anfa agreement, after the suburb of Casablanca where it had been negotiated. To provide logistical support for the French Army units, Base 901 was formed in North Africa. It moved to Naples on 22 November 1943, where it came under the American Peninsula Base Section (PBS), and operated in support of the French Expeditionary Corps (CEF) in Italy. The French were urged to assume as much responsibility for the support of the CEF as possible in order to take the pressure off the PBS. To that end a list of the required logistical units was drawn up, but none of them had been activated by the end of January 1944.

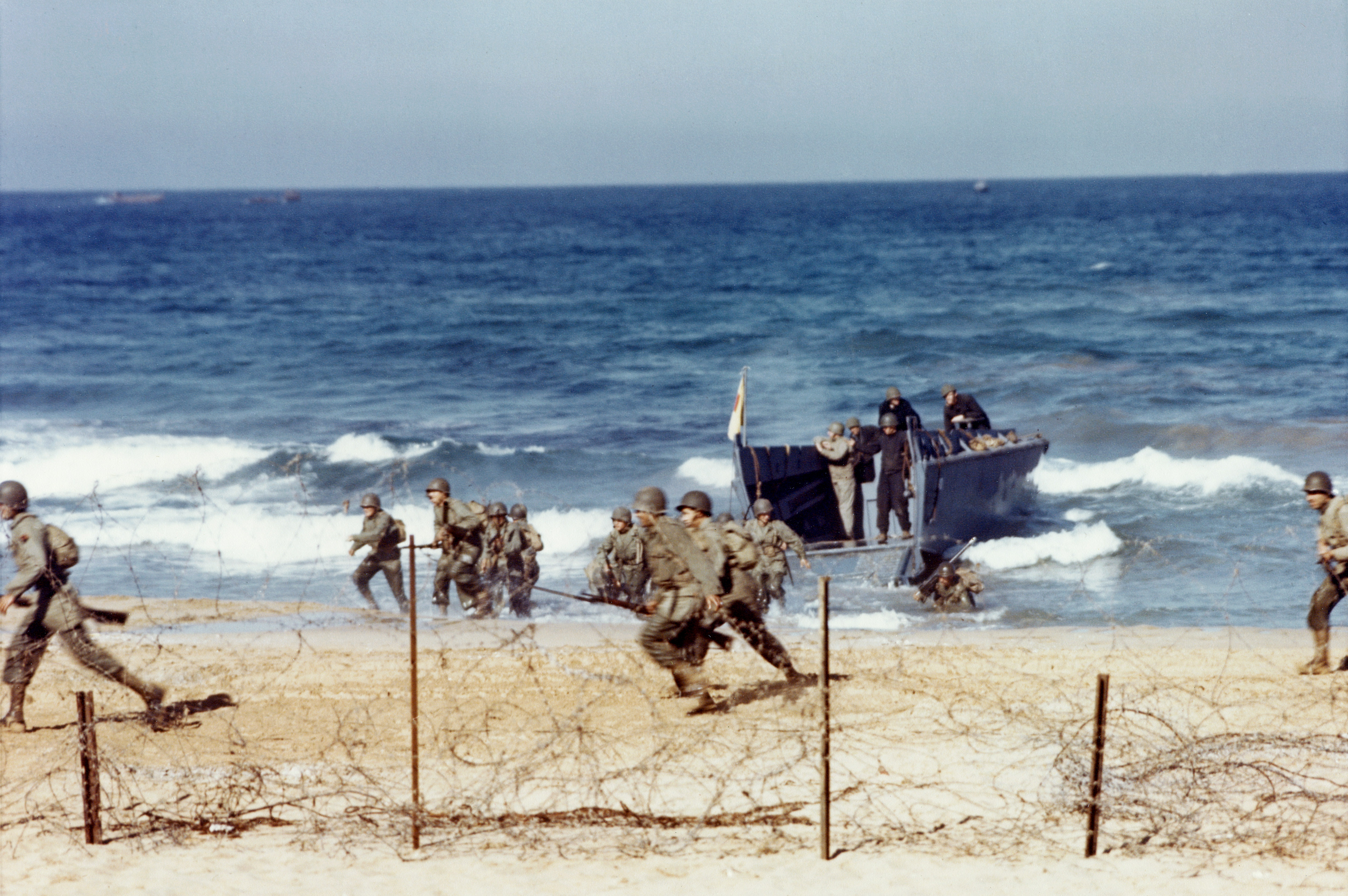
French Foreign Legion troops with US weapons, uniforms and equipment land on a North African beach during amphibious exercises.

The Armee d'Afrique, the French Army's North African forces, was significantly drawn from soldiers from French Algeria, Morocco and Tunisia; French West Africa and French Equatorial Africa. None of these territories had seen much industrial development. As a result, sourcing the requisite skilled personnel for service units from this recruit pool proved challenging. When Général d'Armée Henri Giraud met with Wilson and Devers on 9 March to discuss the arrangements for Anvil, he ventured the opinion that it would be "a pity to waste excellent combat troops by converting them into service units in which duty they were poor", and expressed the hope that the US Army could supply logistical support to the French forces. Devers was sympathetic, but NATOUSA was itself short 10,000 logistical personnel, and Devers's requests to the War Department for additional service units to support the French were denied. Giraud therefore attempted to do what he could. By the end of March some service units were ready for deployment to Italy, where they came under the CEF or Base 901, which was now commanded by Général de brigade Jean Gross.

The effort to produce the required service units was unsuccessful, and by the end of June some forty logistical units were yet to be activated. The French division slice was estimated to be around 32,500 men, well short of the 40,000 considered desirable for US Army divisions. On 14 June, the War Department was forced to concede that the US Army would have to provide logistical support to the French, but only when deployed together with US forces under US command. When the French decided in early August to defer the activation of some service units, including truck battalions and ordnance maintenance companies, AFHQ informed Général d'armée Alphonse Juin that no further requests for equipment would be entertained for units not on the Operation Anvil troop list until the service units were activated. Towards the end of July it was discovered that of 27 French truck companies with 48 trucks each, just ten had been activated, and of these only two had been equipped.

The French forces were plagued by shortages of all kinds. Requests for equipment from US sources were frequently denied because the items were unobtainable, or because the War Department deemed them nonessential, or simply because the French failed to submit the required paperwork in a timely manner. Only when equipment was unobtainable from French sources, including units not on the Anvil troop list, was it drawn from US stocks, and then only if it was not required by US forces. NATOUSA did not request equipment be shipped from the United States unless it was unavailable in the Mediterranean theater. Brigadier General Harold F. Loomis, the head of the Joint Rearmament Commission (JRC), which had responsibility for rearming French units in North Africa, carefully scrutinized French requests. The French provided items peculiar to French units such as wine, brandy, and olive oil, but all other supplies were ordered by the CBS through US Army channels. Base 901 was assigned to the CBS on 1 August, and Gross became a CBS deputy commander with responsibility for French units.

By August, 150,000 French and 750,000 American troops had been withdrawn from combat in Italy, and were regrouping in Corsica, southern Italy and North Africa in preparation for Anvil. Items of equipment that had been worn out, damaged or lost in action were replaced by SOS NATOUSA. Enough supplies had been accumulated to support 450,000 troops for thirty days.

== Mounting ==
The primary mounting port for Operation Dragoon was Naples, where 75 merchant ships and 307 landing craft were loaded by the Peninsula Base Section. Priority was given to outbound loading (outloading), which caused a backlog of ships awaiting to be discharged; only ships containing ammunition and perishables were discharged until outloading operations were complete. Drawing on experience gained in mounting the Anzio operation, each type of ship was loaded in a specific part of the Naples area: the attack transports, attack cargo ships and Liberty ships in Naples harbor, the LSTs in Nisida, the Landing Craft Infantry (LCIs) in Pozzuoli, and the Landing craft tank (LCTs) in Baiae.

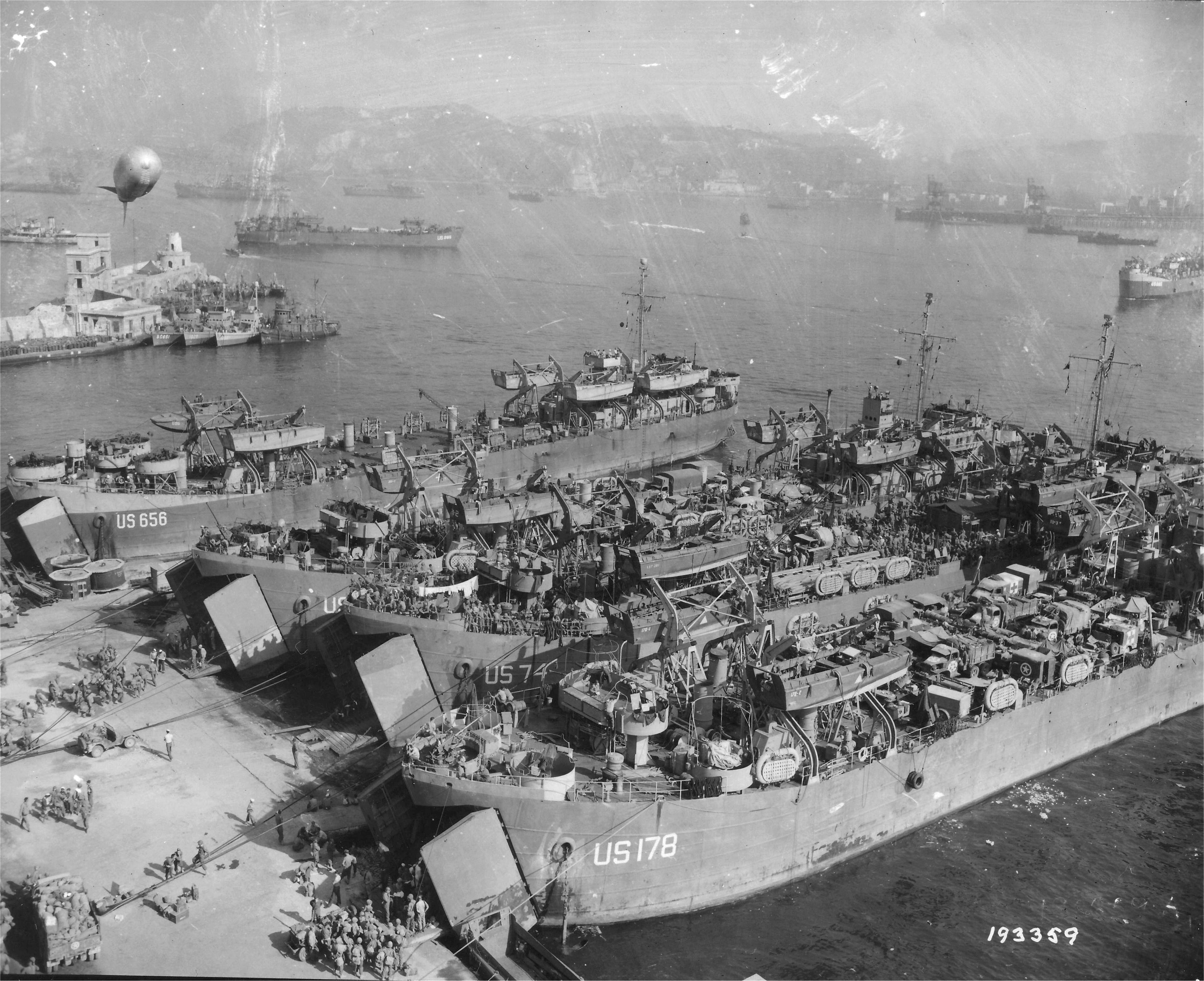
LSTs are loaded in Naples.

To minimize congestion at Naples, the French forces in Italy, the 1st Motorized Infantry Division and the 3rd Algerian Infantry Division, embarked from Brindisi and Taranto. The 1st Special Service Force and the Commandos d'Afrique embarked at Agropoli. Oran was the secondary mounting port where most of the follow-on French forces were embarked, the exception being the 9th Colonial Infantry Division, which was on Corsica, and was loaded at Ajaccio. Air Force units coming from Corsica were loaded at Calvi and L'Île-Rousse. All ships were loaded and ready to sail on 8 August. Hewitt's Western Naval Task Force consisted of 885 ships and landing craft that sailed under their own power with 1,375 smaller landing craft carried on board them.

It was anticipated that Marseille and Toulon would not be captured quickly, and that when they were captured, that they would be badly damaged. Logistic plans therefore provided for the possibility that Operation Dragoon would have to be maintained over the beaches for a prolonged period of time. The logistic support provided for and by the fleet was therefore more extensive than in previous operations in the Mediterranean. The store ship USS Ariel arrived on 15 July with 1,848 long tons (1,878 t) of fresh, refrigerated and frozen produce, which was discharged at Naples, Bizerte, Palermo and Oran. It was followed by the store ships USS Merak, Yukon and Polaris. The USS Tarazed reached Oran on 4 September and was able to discharge in the assault area.

The Royal Fleet Auxiliary oil tankers RFA A151 and Ennerdale, each carrying 7,000 US barrels (830,000 L) of marine diesel oil and 28,000 US barrels (3,300,000 L) of fuel oil, accompanied the assault forces. LST mother ships were refueled from the tankers and in turn provided fuel for the landing craft. Six British motor fuel vessels, four of which were manned by French crews, accompanied the LCTs and acted as mobile fuel stations for them. In previous operations in the Mediterranean, the US Navy had not deployed ships larger than light cruisers, but this time battleships were available. Reserves of ammunition for American ships were carried by the ammunition ships USS Nitro, which came from the United Kingdom, and Mount Baker, which sailed from the United States. The French ships participating created a resupply problem; only 191 rounds of high-capacity ammunition were available for the 13.4-inch (340 mm) guns of the French battleship Lorraine.

== Assault ==
=== Seaborne ===
The main landings were made on 15 August on three beaches on a front of 60 miles (97 km). Task Force 84 under Rear Admiral Frank J. Lowry landed Major General John W. O'Daniel's 3rd Infantry Division on the Alpha beaches at Cavalaire-sur-Mer and Saint-Tropez; Task Force 85 under Rear Admiral Bertram J. Rodgers landed Major General William W. Eagles's 45th Infantry Division on the Delta beaches at Baie de Bougnon and Sainte-Maxime; and Rear Admiral Spencer S. Lewis's Task Force 87 landed Major General John E. Dahlquist's 36th Infantry Division on the Camel beaches east of Saint-Raphaël. The infantry divisions all had carried out at least one amphibious operation before.

Each beach had a beach control group, built around a reinforced combat engineer regiment. The 36th Combat Engineer Regiment and the 1st Naval Beach Battalion were assigned to the Alpha beaches; the 40th Combat Engineer Regiment and the 4th Naval Beach Battalion to the Delta beaches; and the 540th Combat Engineer Regiment and the 8th Naval Beach Battalion to the Camel beaches. Each beach control group had attached port, quartermaster and medical units. Like the infantry divisions, combat engineer regiments were all veterans of at least one amphibious operation; the 36th Combat Engineer Regiment was participating in its fifth. For the first time, the US Navy provided a liaison officer, Captain Sydney B. Dodds, to coordinate the naval beach battalions. This allowed the Seventh Army and beach control groups to call ships forward based on the needs of the entire force. The beach control groups assumed overall responsibility for the operation of the beaches from Seventh Army on 17 August, one day ahead of schedule. In response to the changed tactical situation, the arrival of two French divisions was advanced by two days, and subsequent convoys by up to ten days.

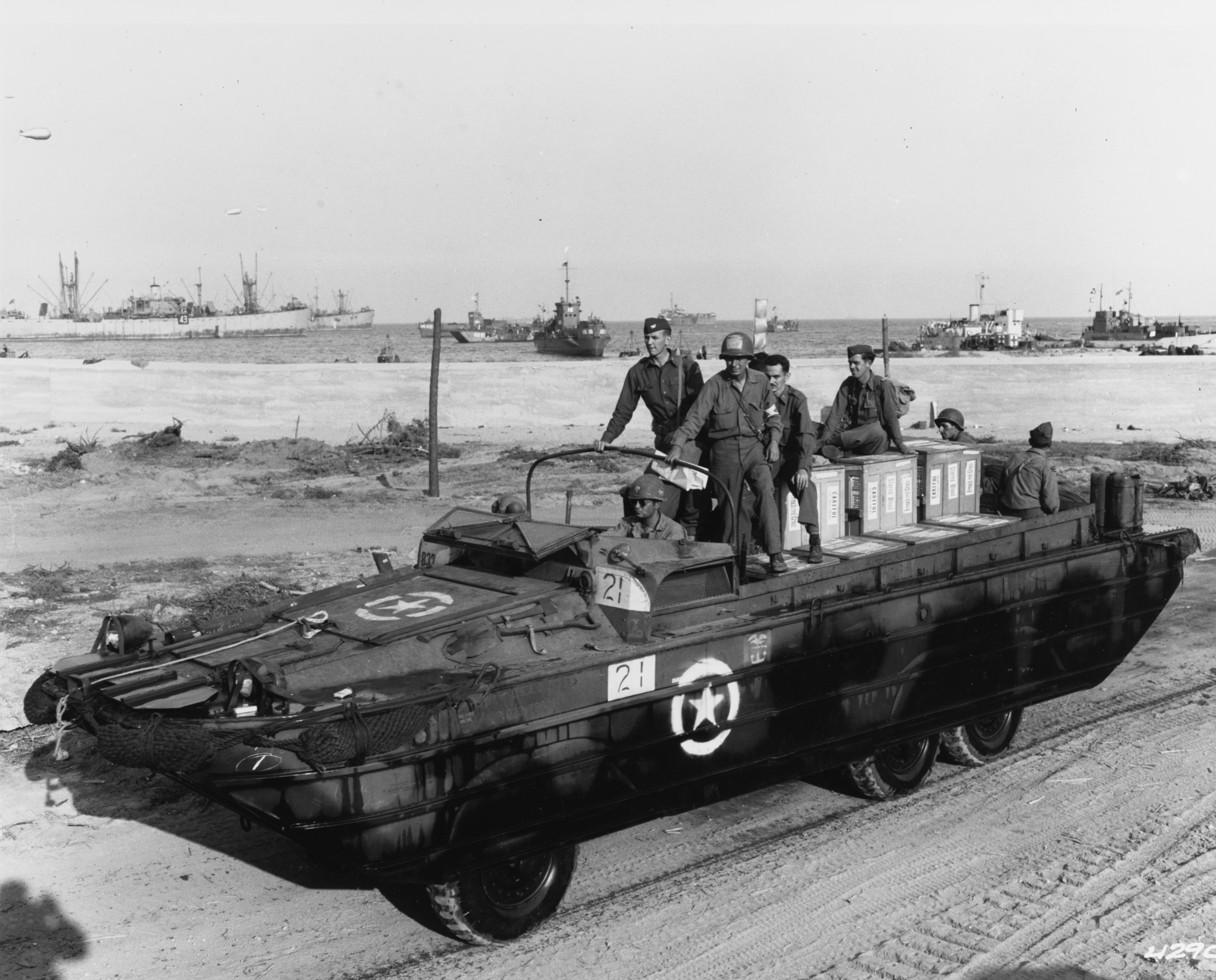
A DUKW with a load of blood and medical personnel moves in from a landing beach on 26 August 1944. USS LCI(L)-18 is beached in the center background.

Beach operations proceeded smoothly, aided by fine weather, good surf conditions, the absence of strong tides, and weaker than anticipated German opposition. A delay in the 36th Infantry Division capturing Camel Red beach caused a 36-hour delay in unloading operations there, but Camel Green beach proved to be a good substitute. It not only received cargo intended for Camel Red, but also some intended for the Agay beach. Camel Red was opened on 17 August, and Agay beach was closed two days later, with its cargo sent to Camel Red. The Delta beaches were found to have poor exits, and operations were transferred to beaches in the Gulf of Saint-Tropez. Most difficulty was encountered at the Alpha beaches where operations were delayed by underwater mines. A sandbar at Alpha Yellow caused some LSTs to beach prematurely, and several vehicles drowned before a ponton causeway was erected. Soft sand also caused problems, and the engineers laid a roadway using logs.

Seventh Army assigned port battalion crews to specific ships. The stevedores loaded the ship, then traveled on it to southern France, where they unloaded it. Since they knew the contents of the ship and the location of items on board, this permitted the quick unloading of specific and urgent items. Convoys arrived in daylight and departed at night. Cargo was unloaded using cargo nets. Each of the engineer combat regiments in the beach groups was provided with 600 cargo nets, and each cargo ship arriving off the beach brought another 110, which were retained on the beaches. Nets were placed on the shore where LCTs beached, and cargo was piled onto them. Motor cranes, A-frames mounted on DUKWs and 6x6 trucks with Quickway cranes were then used to lift the cargo onto trucks, which took it to a dump where it was unloaded using a crane. The trucks then returned to the LCTs with nets from the dump. Cargo ships were unloaded by lowering cargo in cargo nets onto DUKWs. There was a general shortage of cargo nets owing to too many ships being unloaded at once, too few trucks to move the cargo to the dumps, and insufficient personnel to unload the cargo at the dump sites. As an expedient, cargo was often tipped from the net onto the ground at the dump site, with consequent breakages.

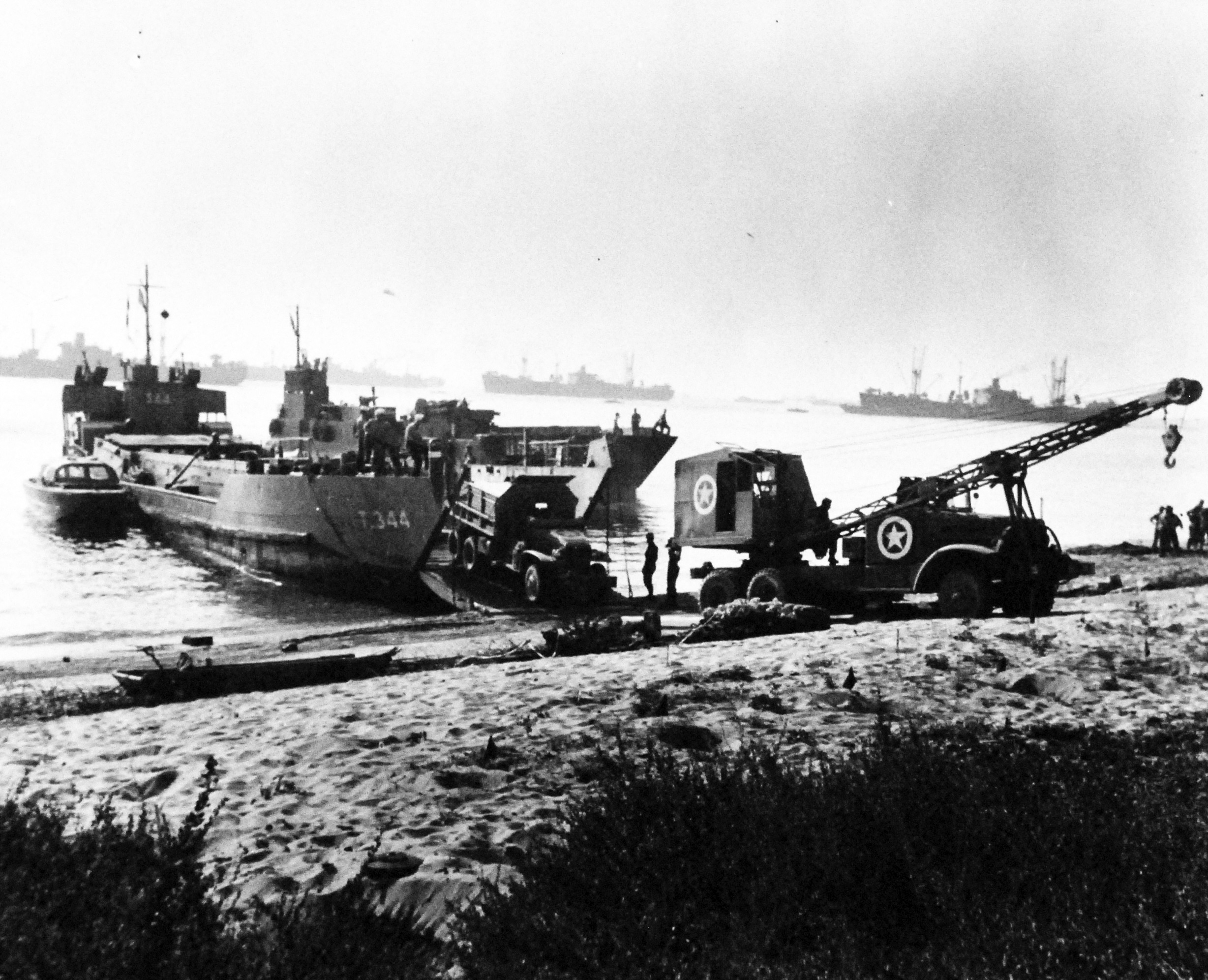
Trucks and cranes roll ashore from LCTs on D-Day.

Despite the favorable conditions, unloading soon fell behind schedule. The ships were combat loaded, but in the expectation that there would be heavy fighting, ammunition was loaded on top, and had to be removed to access other stores. Nor did trucks arrive fast enough to keep up with the pace of the advance. There was also a shortage of labor. Newly arrived service units were expected to provide additional labor on the beaches, but the advance proceeded too fast, and these units moved forward to operate the dump sites. Italian service units proved extremely useful, and POWs were used where allowed by the Third Geneva Convention, but there were language barriers since they spoke German, Russian, Polish and occasionally other languages. POWs needed guarding to prevent their escape or reprisal attacks on them by civilians, and insufficient military police or combat unit personnel were available for guard duty. Local civilian labor proved difficult to find, as most able-bodied men had been deported for forced labor, joined the French Forces of the Interior (FFI) or fled to North Africa to join the Free French forces. Only a thousand, mostly teenagers and old men, had been hired by 20 August, and only seven thousand French civilians were working for the US forces by mid-September.

Dump sites were selected before the landing from aerial photographs based on their accessibility to road and rail transport, and the area available for storage facilities, but when reconnaissance teams surveyed the dump sites after the landing, large numbers of land mines were discovered, which had to be removed before they could be used for storage. Some of the dump areas were found to become swampy after rain, and had to be moved to higher and drier ground, which often lacked the access to transport. Between 15 August and 8 September 265,939 long tons (270,206 t) of supplies and 46,505 vehicles were landed over the beaches. About 33,000 POWs and 6,200 casualties were evacuated. By 14 September the beach dumps held 11,740 long tons (11,930 t) of subsistence, 8,821 long tons (8,963 t) of POL, and 58,488 long tons (59,427 t) of ammunition. Another 10,252 long tons (10,417 t) of POL were held at Marseille and Port de Bouc.

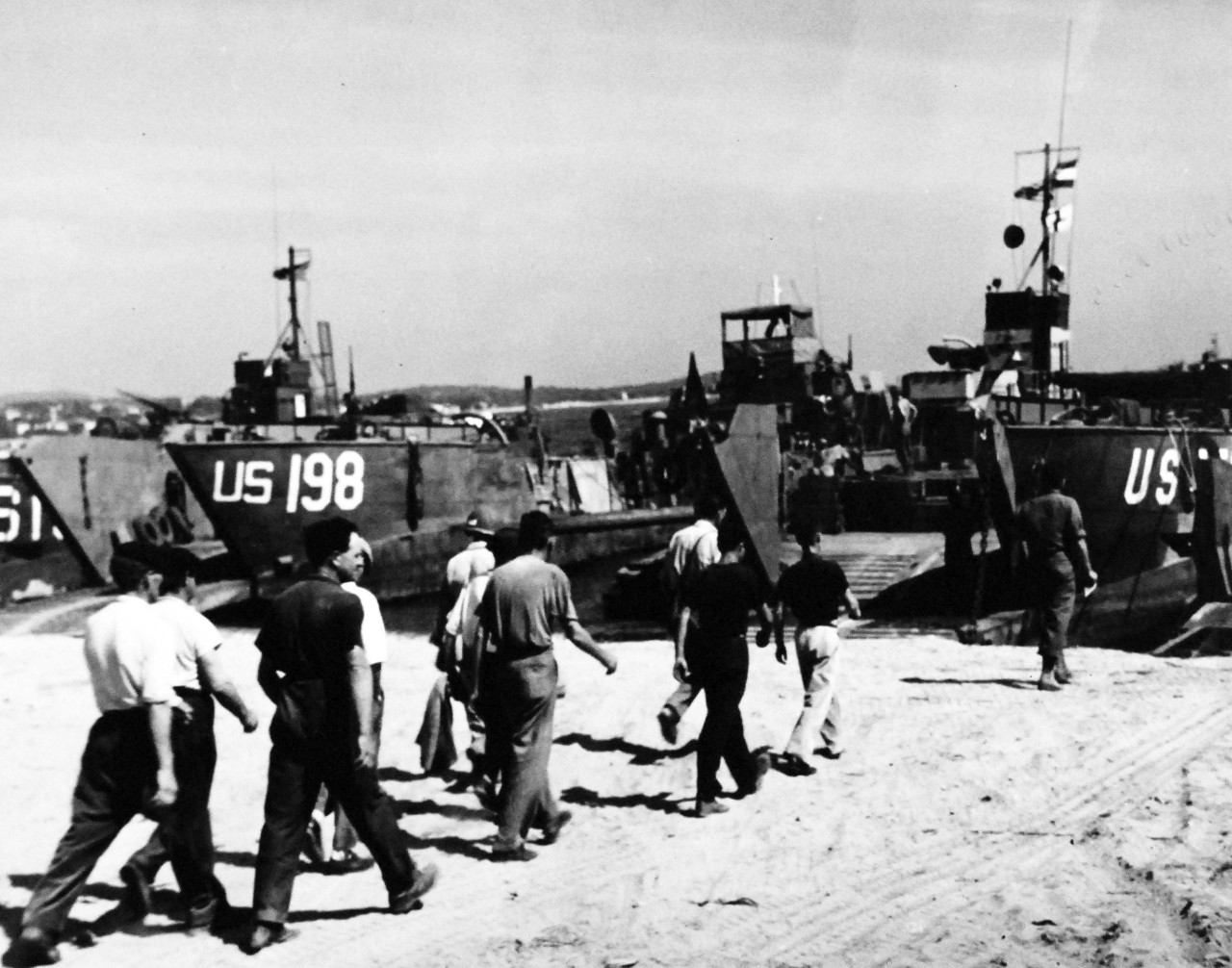
French civilian volunteers help unload supplies from LCTs.

The Coastal Base Section assumed responsibility for the beaches on 9 September, a week earlier than planned. The Alpha beaches were closed that day, followed by the Delta beaches on 16 September, and the camel beaches on 28 September. By this time 324,069 personnel, 68,419 vehicles, 490,237 long tons (498,104 t) of supplies and 325,730 US barrels (38,840,000 L) of fuel had been landed.

=== Airborne ===
For the airborne operation, the troop carrier force in the NATOUSA, the 51st Troop Carrier Wing, was joined by the 50th and 53rd Troop Carrier Wings, which flew out from the UK to Italy via Gibraltar and Marrakesh to avoid overflying German-occupied France and neutral Spain. All troop carrier units were at their designated airfields in the Rome area by 20 July. Between them, the three wings had 413 aircraft. Only 130 Waco CG-4 and 50 Airspeed Horsa gliders were on hand, but 350 more were on order from the United States. The order was expedited, and the gliders were assembled in time. To fly them, the three troop carrier wings had 375 glider pilots. So that each glider would have a pilot and a copilot, another 350 glider pilots were flown in from the UK. Some 600,000 pounds (270,000 kg) of cargo parachutes and aerial delivery equipment arrived by 11 August. Major General Paul L. Williams arrived on 16 July and assumed command of the Provisional Troop Carrier Air Division, which was formed for this operation.

On 15 August, 444 paratroop and 408 glider sorties were flown, which delivered 6,488 paratroops and 2,611 glider troops, with 221 vehicles, 213 artillery pieces and 500 short tons (450 t) of supplies. The first resupply mission was flown on 16 August, and delivered 246 short tons (223 t) of supplies, mostly ammunition. Three small emergency supply missions were flown the following day, which delivered 60 short tons (54 t) of rations, medical supplies and signal equipment. Within 48 hours all the airborne objectives had been taken and the airborne forces had linked up with the seaborne ones.

== Base organization ==
The advance party of the Coastal Base Section arrived on 24 August. Under the original plan, Toulon was to be captured by D plus 15, followed by Marseille by D plus 45, and it was expected that the CBS would operate from Toulon until Marseille was captured, but on seeing the progress made towards the capture of Marseille, the advance party decided to move thence at once, and began requisitioning hotels and restaurants for the use of the CBS and Base 901 even though the city had not yet been secured, and German demolitions were ongoing. The advance party established its headquarters in the Astoria Hotel.

A small advance party of Base 901 arrived on 16 August, but it was quickly swamped by the demands placed upon it. As a result, support of the French forces in the initial stages of Dragoon became the responsibility of the CBS. The first echelon of Base 901 arrived at Marseille on 31 August, followed by the second echelon on 15 September, and the third and fourth echelons two weeks later. With just 1,200 men and 200 vehicles, Base 901 was inadequately resourced for the campaign ahead; by American standards, it should have had at least 112,000 personnel.

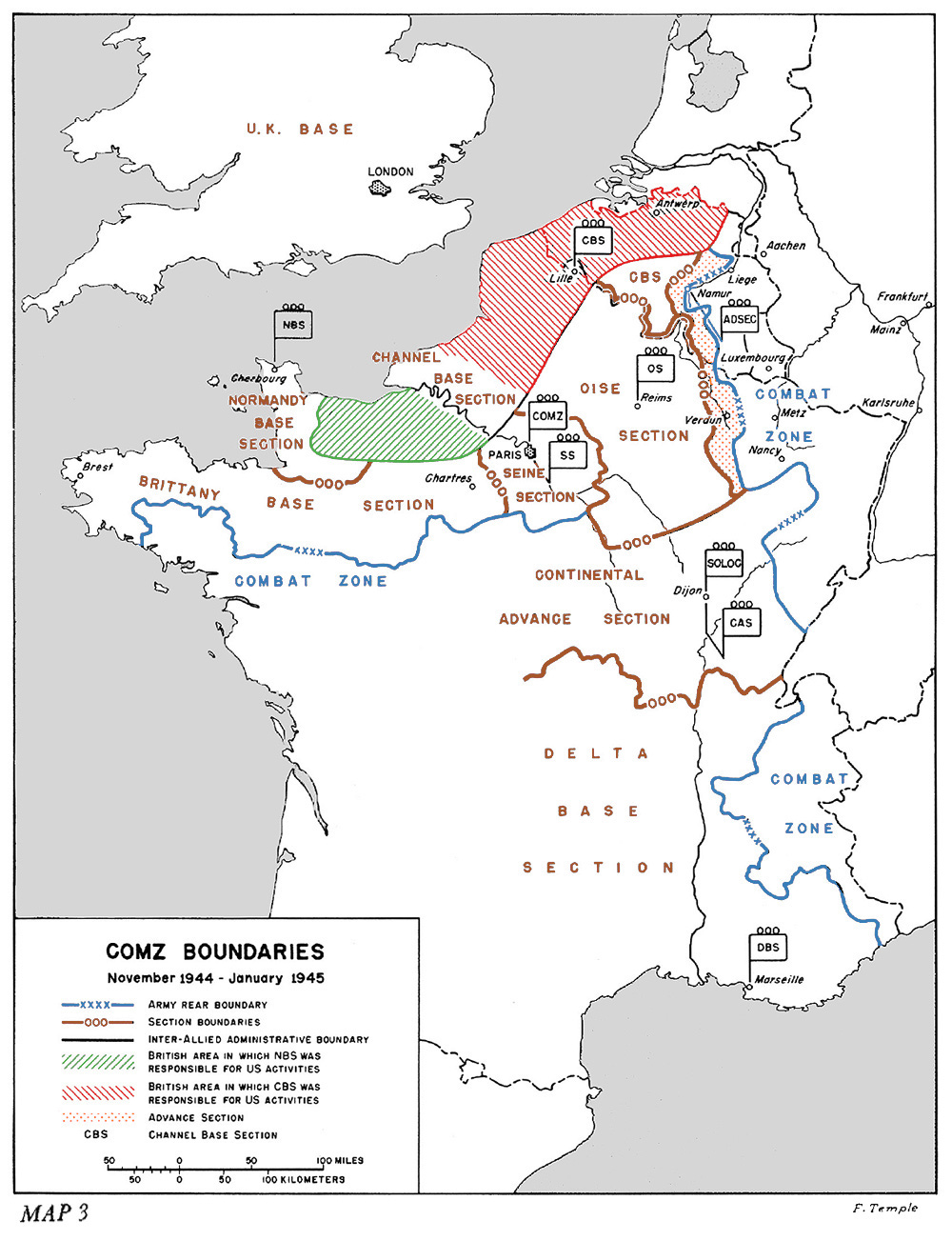

On 10 September, the Coastal Base Section was renamed the Continental Base Section. Dijon was captured the following day, and on 18 September the advance party of the Continental Base Section headquarters moved there, followed by the main body on 1 October. It was initially established in the Grand Hôtel La Cloche, but later moved to the former Gestapo headquarters at 32 Rue Talant. On 26 September, the Continental Base Section was redesignated the Continental Advance Section (CONAD), effective 1 October. The Marseille area was turned over to the new Delta Base Section, under Ratay's command. The boundary between the two was the northern boundaries of the French departments of Ain, Rhône, Loire and Allier. The Delta Base Section became responsible for 190,000 troops spread over 110,000 square miles (280,000 km^{2}).

The change to CONAD represented a change of role and not just designation; as an advance section, CONAD worked closely with the Seventh Army and retained minimal levels of stocks in its depots, usually a 15‑day supply. Although the Mediterranean theater had a great deal of experience, the concept of an advance section was a new one, and some degree of trial and error was required to work out the proper relationship between CONAD and the Delta Base Section. The split forced the understaffed Base 901 to also split, with part under Général de brigade Georges-Vincent-André Granier joining CONAD in Dijon on 12 October.

The US Seventh Army linked up with the Allied forces coming from Normandy on 12 September, and AFHQ transferred operational control of the forces in southern France to Eisenhower's Supreme Headquarters, Allied Expeditionary Force (SHAEF) on 15 September. This officially marked the end of the campaign, but the logistical organizations remained separate. An advance echelon of SOS NATOUSA was organized in Italy and arrived at Dijon on 12 September to control both the Delta Base Section and CONAD. SOS NATOUSA became Communications Zone (COMZONE) NATOUSA on 1 October, Lieutenant General Joseph T. McNarney succeeded Devers as the Deputy Commander of NATOUSA on 22 October, allowing Devers to devote all his time and energy to running the Sixth United States Army Group in France.

When NATOUSA was renamed the Mediterranean Theater of Operations, United States Army (MTOUSA), on 1 November, COMZONE NATOUSA Advance became COMZONE MTOUSA Advance. On 20 November, COMZONE MTOUSA Advance was detached from MTOUSA and became part of Lieutenant General John C. H. Lee's COMZONE, European Theater of Operations (ETO) as the Southern Line of Communications (SOLOC), under Larkin's command, with Granier as his deputy. In addition to the Delta Base Section and CONAD, the 1st Military Railways Service was also directly subordinated to SOLOC. The logistical organizations in northern and southern France were now merged into one, but SOLOC continued to exercise a considerable degree of autonomy, and still drew supplies from MTOUSA and directly from the United States.

== Ports ==
=== Marseille ===
The early capture of Toulon and Marseille led Davidson to revise the scheduled arrival of engineer units and equipment for port reconstruction. He opposed the Navy's plan to rehabilitate both Marseille and Toulon, and he recommended that efforts be concentrated on the former. Toulon was primarily a naval base, with narrow wharves and only single-track rail access, whereas Marseille was France's major port. Before the war it had received fifty cargo ships and passenger liners on an average day. It had 300 acres (120 ha) of deep water anchorages, a 3 1/2-mile (5.6 km) jetty that protected a harbor with ten basins, and rail facilities capable of handling 350 boxcars per day. A conference on 1 September chaired by Major General A. Arnim White, the chief of staff of the Seventh Army, ruled in Davidson's favor.

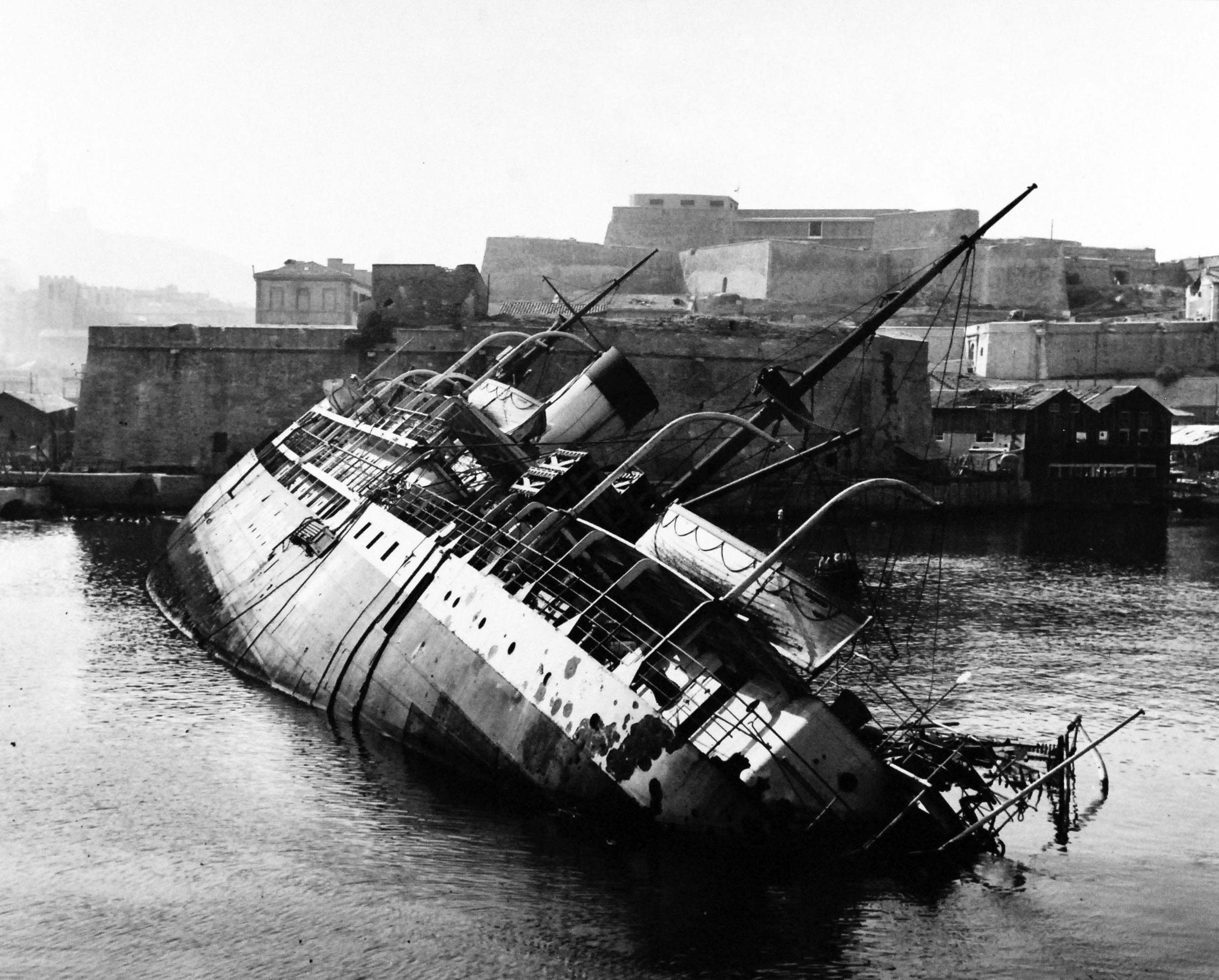
Destruction to the harbor and installations at Marseille, France

The port of Marseille had been subject to extensive demolitions. Not one of the 23 piers or berths along the mole was usable. The warehouses and sorting sheds had been destroyed, the unloading cranes rendered inoperable through toppling or sabotage, and the railway tracks ripped up. The docks were strewn with improvised explosive devices made from pairs of drums of picric acid each weighing 300 pounds (140 kg). Teller mines, schu mines and booby traps were also present in abundance. Sea mines weighing 1 long ton (1 t) were found embedded in the docks, but in most cases the timers intended to detonate them had not been installed. One was found with three 21-day timers, set so that it would go off after 63 days. Port operations commenced using the beaches on the northern part of the port. Three beaches were used, and one known as Martin Beach remained in use until 1945. During September, 87,000 troops disembarked over the beaches from 84 landing ships and transports.

The first engineer units to arrive were the 2nd Battalion, 36th Engineer Combat Regiment, and the 355th Engineer General Service Regiment. The former concentrated on clearing away the mines around Vieux Port area while the latter concentrated on the deep water harbor. The 355th Engineer General Service Regiment had previously been involved in mine clearance operations in Tunisia and Corsica. It removed over 61,500 pounds (27,900 kg) of explosives from the docks, along with 2,000 Teller mines. Many had to be detonated in place because the fuses had deteriorated too badly to permit them to be deactivated safely. The unit suffered 17 casualties, including one dead, but there were no more mine explosions on the docks. Craters were filled in, and the dock walls were repaired.

A US Navy salvage party and a detachment of the 1051st Engineer Port Construction and Repair Group arrived on 1 September. The 1051st was a specialized formation that had previously handled the rehabilitation of the ports of Palermo and Naples. The divers of the 1051st discovered that the port and berth entrances had been blocked by 33 ships. Some 65 ships had been scuttled in the harbor channels in a criss-cross arrangement, sometimes in two or three layers. Seven large ocean-going ships had been sunk in a heap at the harbor mouth to block it. The pattern of scuttling and demolition was designed to preclude the laying of piers over sunken ships, as had been done in Naples.

Harbor clearance was undertaken by two groups from the US Navy, each consisting of about ten officers and a hundred enlisted men, plus two smaller groups from the British Royal Navy. Mines had been used prodigiously; some 172 were removed from the main basin. Minesweeper operations outside the breakwater set off mines in the inner basins. Navy minesweepers and salvage teams removed 5,000 mines of 15 different types. The engineers decided to bypass the harbor entrance by blowing a gap in the breakwater, but before this occurred the Navy managed to topple one of the seven sunken vessels in the pile, and this permitted ships to enter.

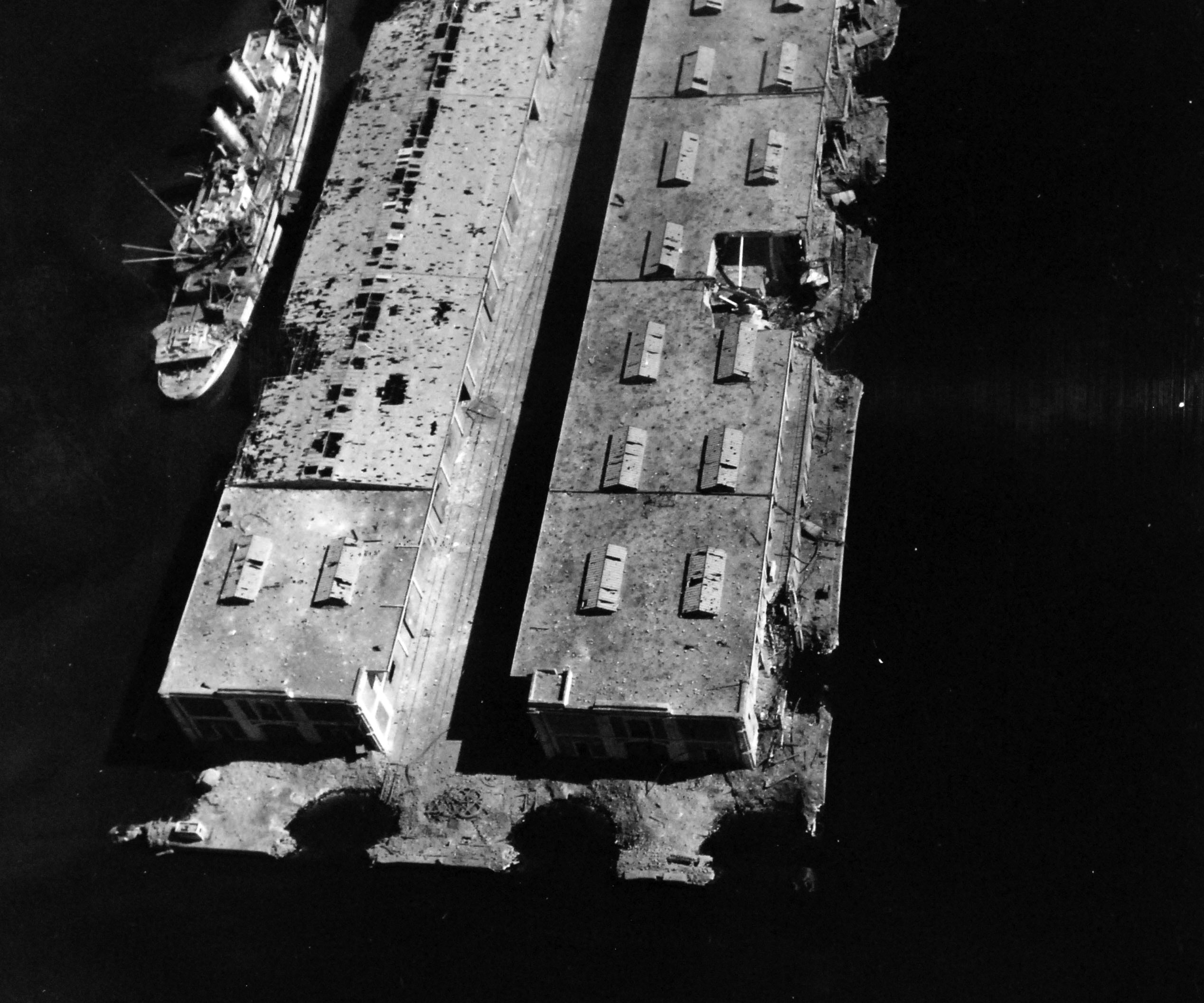
Aerial view of destruction to the harbor and installations at Marseille, France

The first to do so was the Liberty ship Robert Treat Paine, followed by its sister ships Henry W. Longfellow and Christopher Gale. They brought troops and equipment of Colonel R. Hunter Clarkson's 6th Port, and were unloaded in the stream by DUKWs. The 6th Port had previously operated the ports of Casablanca and Naples. The 6th Port brought four large cranes and a floating crane with it from Naples. Other cranes were repaired or brought from the beaches. By the end of September 39 cranes were in operation at Marseille. The first ship, another Liberty, Samsteel was able to dock on 15 September, and by the end of the month, 18 berths were available for use. On 19 September, the Swiss-registered Generosa, carrying a cargo of honey and powdered eggs, struck a mine, and the master and several crew members were lost.

Tugs and barges to work the port were drawn from other ports in the MTO and directly from the United States. In September, 36 disassembled 100-measurement-ton (110 m^{3}) Quonset barges arrived in Naples, where they were assembled and then towed to Marseille by tugs. Another 18 barges arrived in October. The project was set back when one of the four large tugs used to tow the barges between Naples and Marseille capsized and sank. Pilferage was a problem at Marseille, with 600 arrests in October and 1,744 in November. Theft of gasoline was a major problem, and contributed to the POL shortage.

By the end of September, 188 ships had discharged 113,499 long tons (115,320 t) of cargo, 32,798 vehicles and 10,000 US barrels (1,200,000 L) of POL through the port of Marseille, and two hospital ships had taken on casualties. During November, Marseille handled 486,574 long tons (494,382 t) of cargo.

=== Port-de-Bouc ===
Port-de-Bouc was a satellite port of Marseille about 25 miles (40 km) by sea to the northwest. Before the war it was the hub of a canal system that allowed barges to travel from the Rhône to Marseille. Docks were laid out along a 3 1/2-mile (5.6 km) strait connected to the Étang de Berre, a salt lake, and there was a complex of canals, small wharves and an oil refinery. The port was small compared to Marseille, with a prewar capacity of 7,000 long tons (7,100 t) of cargo, but German demolitions were not as extensive. The wharves had been demolished in such a way as to blast large stones into the water to render the berths unusable. The channel was blocked and the cranes were wrecked.

Salvage vessels entered the harbor on 27 August. LST-134 arrived with Seabees of the 1040th Construction Battalion Detachment and Company A of the 355th Engineer General Service Regiment arrived at Port-de-Bouc on 27 August. A French contractor offered to assist with repairs immediately, accepting on faith that he would be fairly reimbursed by the US Army. The stones that had been toppled into the waters were replaced, and craters were filled in. The US Navy swept the mines, and the lone sunken vessel blocking the channel was removed. Two cranes were repaired, and three berths were opened on the quays and a T-shaped jetty. On 4 September, the rescue and salvage ship USS Tackle (ARS-37) was being towed to the fueling and watering berth in the Basin Petrolier by the French tug Provencal when she grazed a buoy and set off a mine that had been attached to it. Provencal sank, and two men were killed and nine wounded on Tackle, which was towed to Toulon, where her crew and salvage equipment were unloaded, and then to Palermo for repairs.

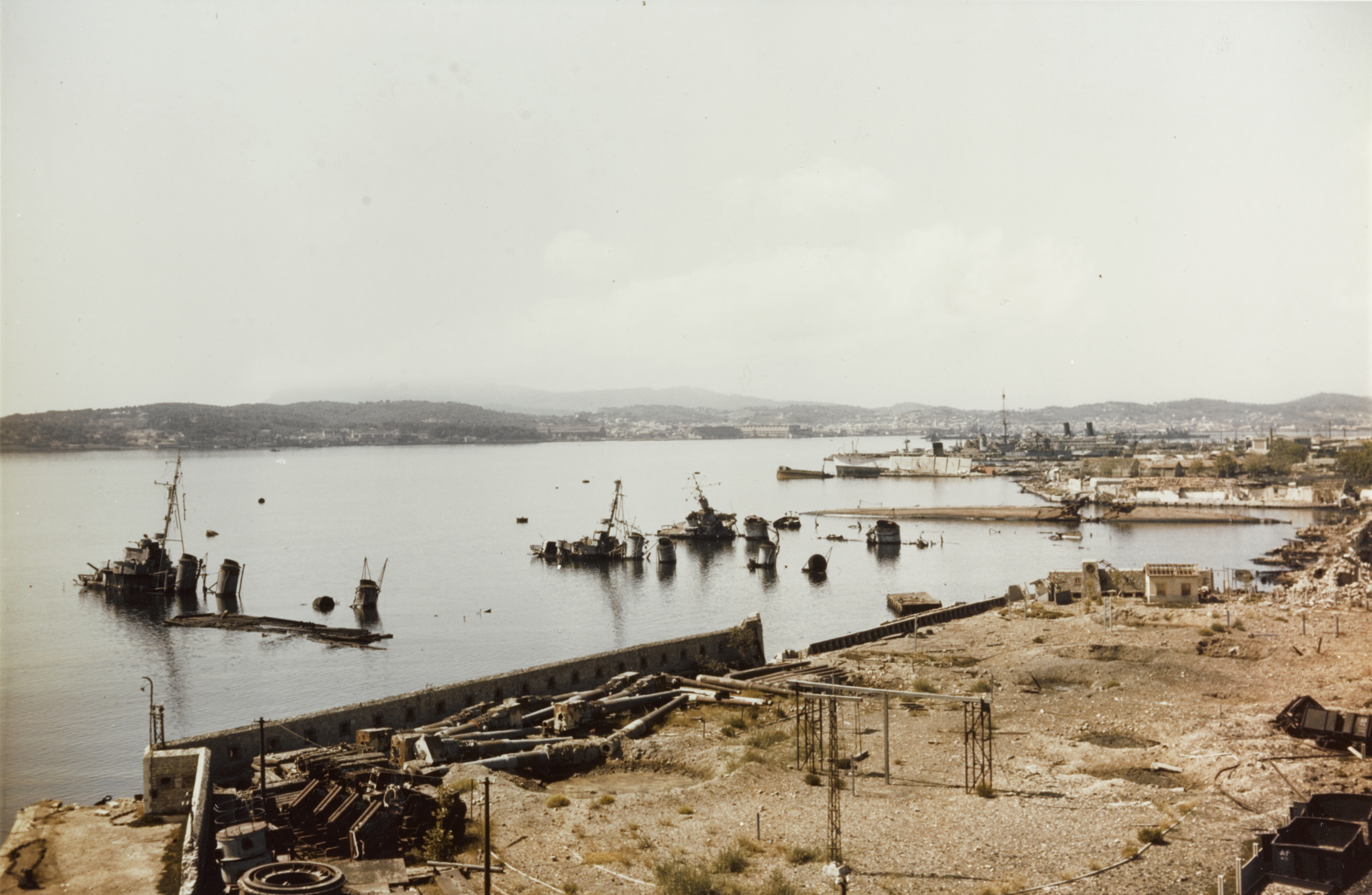
The Toulon Naval Dockyard in 1944. The sunken ships were scuttled in 1942 by the Vichy French to prevent German capture.

Port-de-Bouc became the main port of entry in southern France for POL, supplying seventy percent of Allied requirements. The FFI secured the oil refineries, which were only lightly damaged, having suffered no more than a few bullet holes from the XII Tactical Air Command. The oil storage facilities could hold 250,000 US barrels (30,000,000 L), and were quickly restored to working order by the 697th and 1379th Engineer Petroleum Distribution Companies and oil company employees. Eventually storage was provided for 1,500,000 US barrels (180,000,000 L). The storage tanks were ready to receive the first shipment by 29 August, but had to wait another nine days for minesweeping operations to complete.

By the end of September, 23 ships had discharged 36,837 long tons (37,428 t) of general cargo and 38,558 long tons (39,177 t) or 331,600 US barrels (39,540,000 L) of POL at Port-de-Bouc. Army cargo discharged at Port-de-Bouc rose to 51,481 long tons (52,307 t) of general cargo and 70,070 long tons (71,190 t) of POL in October, and 62,817 long tons (63,825 t) of general cargo and 79,750 long tons (81,030 t) of POL in November.

=== Toulon ===
Although the Army had decided to concentrate on the rehabilitation of Marseille, Hewitt resolved to do what he could in Toulon, as preliminary surveys indicated that some berths could be opened in Toulon before Marseille. Like the latter, Toulon had been badly damaged by German demolitions and Allied bombing. Almost all the buildings had been destroyed, the roads had been obstructed, the docks had been damaged and the berths had been obstructed with sunken vessels. The task of reconstruction of Toulon was undertaken by the French Navy and the US Navy's 611th Construction Battalion Maintenance Unit.

Since the US Navy had not expected to have to undertake the rehabilitation of a port with its own resources, the materials required such as lumber and welding and cutting gases were procured from French naval and civilian sources. Although no cranes were available, the Seabees managed to clear the docks, bridge wrecks, and provide road access to the berths. No work was carried out except that which would immediately free up berths. A large swing bridge that had been collapsed had to be cut up to remove it from the channel and provide access to the berths in the inner basins. Three sunken ships then had to be removed from the channel. The largest obstacles were the 12,000-gross-register-ton (34,000 m^{3}) liner SS Andre Lebon and the French destroyer Vauban, which were each blocking a berth and had to be shifted. In the end, it was decided that the damage to Vauban was too extensive, and drydock No. 1 was cleared instead.

The first ship to dock at Toulon was the Liberty ship SS F. Marion Crawford, which began discharging on 5 September. A second berth was ready the following day, and nine Liberty ship berths were available by 25 September, along with 31 bow-on sites suitable for LCTs. The port was mainly used for the delivery of civil affairs supplies. By the end of September, 3,441 long tons (3,496 t) of military supplies, about 9,000 long tons (9,100 t) of civil affairs supplies, and 23,629 vehicles had been unloaded at Toulon. Tonnage unloaded through the ports of southern France increased from 174,500 long tons (177,300 t) in August to 326,813 long tons (332,057 t) in September, 524,894 long tons (533,317 t) in October, and 547,602 long tons (556,389 t) in November.

== Transport ==
=== Railways ===
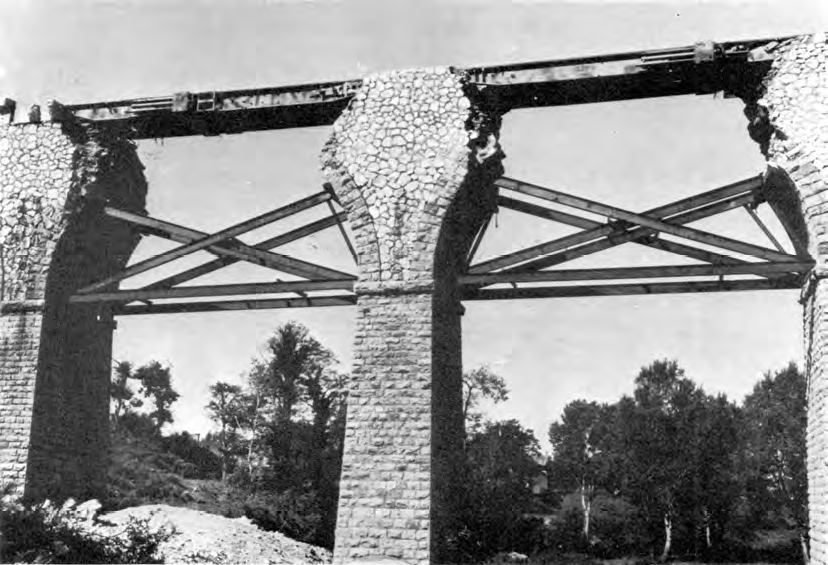
The bridge at Aix-en-Provence was repaired using the carriage of a German railway gun.

The first railways operations began on 17 August, when the Seventh Army opened 15 miles (24 km) of narrow-gauge railway between Saint-Tropez and Cogolin. The 40th Engineer Beach Group found twelve intact locomotives and eighty cars at Carnoules, and a standard-gauge railway between Frejus and Sainte-Maxime commenced operations on the night of 23–24 August, albeit without signals and lights. The first train carried 300 long tons (300 t) of POL, rations and ammunition. Another train departed the same day for Draguignan, using a branch line. On 27 August, loading moved from Frejus to Saint-Raphaël, where there was a better railway station. As the advance continued, the first major break in the railway line was encountered at Meyrargues. The railways at the port had been wrecked, and new tracks had to be laid. By 20 October only eight piers were serviced by railway tracks. However, the nearby Gare de Marseille-Canet, the main freight railway station in Marseille, suffered only minor damage. The railway roundhouses were intact, and thirty serviceable locomotives and around 450 railway cars were found there. Enough coal was located to fuel the trains. Railway operations therefore initially commenced from there instead of the port.

Beyond the Marseille area, the damage was often slight, and railways were usually blocked only with debris. French workers were able to restore the sections where the rails had been torn up. Orders that had been placed for replacement tracks to be shipped from the United States were cancelled, and some of the stockpile in North Africa was given to the French railways there under Lend-Lease. Locomotives were in short supply, though, and by the end of September twelve had been delivered from the US. North of Aix-en-Provence, the railway network split, with dual tracks running along both sides of the Rhône, and a single-track line branching off through Sisteron towards Grenoble. The latter was given priority because it was less badly damaged and could be restored to service more quickly, but it was much steeper, limiting capacity to 125 long tons (127 t) per train, and subject to flooding and to deep snows in the winter.

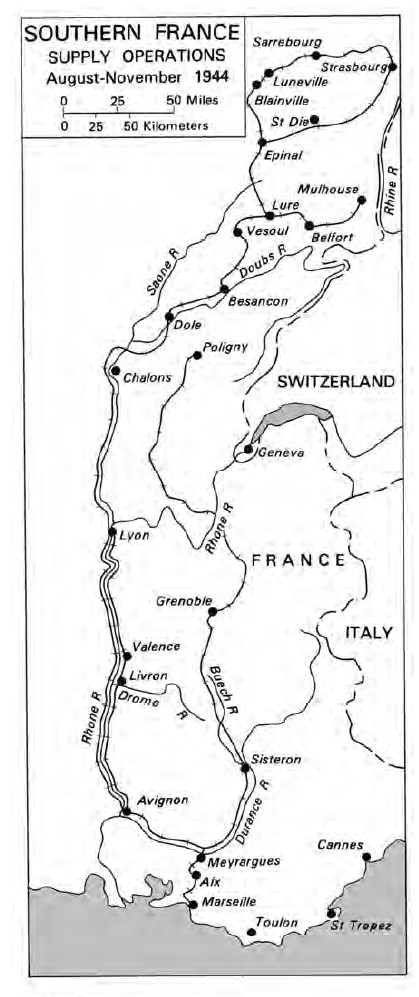
Southern France supply lines August–November 1944

Engineers reconnoitered the line in a Stinson L-5 Sentinel aircraft. In the campaign plan, the task of rehabilitation of the railway system had been assigned to the engineers of the 1st Military Railway Service, who were scheduled to start arriving around D plus 30, but now the task of railway rehabilitation fell to the Seventh Army engineers. Moreover, the more rapid than expected Allied advance caught much of the equipment intended to repair the railways in transit from stockpiles in the Mediterranean or the United States. The arrival of railway units was expedited, with the 703rd Railway Grand Division, which was originally scheduled to arrive on 25 September, and the 713th Railway Operating Battalion, which was supposed to arrive on 5 September, reaching Marseille on 29 August.

Improvisation was called for. At Aix-en-Provence, the 343rd Engineer General Service Regiment used the 104-foot (32 m) base of a captured German 270 mm railway gun to span two 51-foot (16 m) gaps in the railway bridge there, allowing the first train to cross on 29 August. The same unit built a Bailey bridge over the Durance at Meyrargues, which was opened on 17 September. The final link was completed by the 40th Engineer Combat Regiment, which used a Bailey bridge to replace a 91-foot (28 m) gap in the bridge over the Buëch, and local lumber and steel to replace two other missing spans. By 3 September, freight was being moved by rail from Camel Beach to Meyrargues, then by truck to Sisteron, and by rail to Grenoble.

On 15 September, French civilian workers at the Gare de Marseille-Canet who were smoking in a train carrying ammunition for the ground forces, 500-pound (230 kg) bombs for the air forces, and chemical warfare material, set off an explosion that killed ten French civilians and ten American servicemen, and started a fire. Tanks were used to remove other trains from the area. Quick thinking by Lieutenant Colonel George F. Glass, the Coastal Base Section ammunition officer, prevented the fire from reaching a nearby area where 105 mm ammunition was loaded. The fire was eventually brought under control by the 1208th Engineer Composite Fire Fighting Platoon.

The director general of the 1st Military Railway Service, Brigadier General Carl R. Gray Jr., arrived by air from Rome on 14 September with his advance party, and established his headquarters in Lyon. He conducted a reconnaissance of the railway system, and decided to reverse the original order of priorities, and concentrate on the high capacity dual-track railway up the Rhône valley to Lyon. The first task was to repair the bridges over the Durance at Avignon, the Drôme at Livron, and the Isère north of Valence. The 343rd General Service Regiment completed work on all three by 20 September. The 540th Engineer Combat Regiment opened the route from Marseille to Bourg-en-Bresse with two bridges over the Ain near Pont-d'Ain. Meanwhile, the 344th Engineer General Service Regiment erected a 460-foot (140 m) Bailey bridge over the Doubs at Dole, Jura, which was opened for traffic on 5 October. This moved the railhead forward to Besancon and Vesoul. The railway on the east bank was rehabilitated by the 713th, 727th and 759th Railway Operating Battalions and French railway personnel.

By 2 October, freight was moving from Marseille to Vesoul at the rate of 275,000 ton-miles (401,000 tkm) per day. Trucks still remained the main form of haulage in September though, moving 220,000 long tons (220,000 t) of freight compared with 63,000 long tons (64,000 t) moved by rail. At a meeting on 26 September, bids were taken from the various commands and agencies for delivery of their freight by rail. Only 4,923 long tons (5,002 t) per day was accepted, just over half of what was available for shipment, except on 4 October, when bids totaling 8,350 long tons (8,480 t) per day were accepted. This was lifted to 12,000 long tons (12,000 t) per day a week later, and in November 16,000 long tons (16,000 t) per day were carried, and the CONAD railheads in Dijon handled 13,259 long tons (13,472 t) daily.

=== Motor transport ===
The main highway route used in August was the one that ran between Aix-en-Provence and Grenoble. The Seventh Army set priorities and controlled road movements. Fifteen quartermaster truck companies arrived in the first four days of Dragoon, but the swift movement of operational units meant that they were hard-pressed to keep up with demand for their services. The schedules were altered to permit more units to arrive faster than originally planned, but this failed to provide sufficient relief. The situation became serious in September when the Seventh Army began deploying its truck companies to the forward area in support of the advance. The Coastal Base Section required all newly arrived units to load their trucks with Seventh Army cargo and make at least one round trip to the beach dumps.

The road network in southern France was extensive, but restricted by bridges, many of which were limited to loads of 5 metric tons (5 long tons) or less. The most important highways during the southern France campaign from a tactical and logistical point of view were the Route Napoléon, which ran from the beaches to Grenoble, and Route nationale 7, which ran along the left bank of the Rhône, passing through Montelimar, Valence and Lyon. As with the railways, the rapid Allied advance left the Germans with insufficient time to carry out a comprehensive program of demolitions. By the end of September, the Seventh Army engineers had built 88 highway bridges, of which 19 were classified as major works, and 28 Bailey bridges. Work was then undertaken to replace the Bailey bridges with wooden structures, as tactical bridging material was in short supply.

By September, trucks were hauling freight from the coast to the Haute-Saône Department. In addition to the beaches and ports, some were engaged in shuttle operations to cover gaps in the railway network, mainly caused by the demolition of bridges. Movement control was concentrated at the end points, and fine weather allowed vehicles to halt for the night at almost any point along the route. On 25 September, a movement control office opened at the Continental Base Section headquarters in Dijon, and soon after road traffic was shifted from the mountainous Grenoble route to the Rhône valley, rejoining the old route at Bourges. Traffic control stations were established at Aix-en-Provence, Vienne, Lancin and Bourg-en-Bresse. To provide more transport units, two anti-aircraft artillery battalions were converted into quartermaster truck battalions, and additional truck units were organized from Italian POWs. The French continued to use the old route, thereby separating American and French traffic.

The truck units of the Coastal Base Section were concentrated in Marseille, and by the end of September there were 18 truck companies working the port, of which six were equipped with DUKWs. During October, the American truck units were joined by ten Italian and five French companies, and a civilian driver pool with 213 Army and 131 civilian vehicles. On paper there were 2,535 trucks, but only 1,670 were still serviceable. Every available vehicle was put to use to help clear the backlog of ships awaiting discharge, including horse-drawn carts, and additional sailings from Italian and North African ports had to be suspended for a time. This left only one truck company available in the CONAD area. On 10 October long-distance hauls by truck were prohibited.

=== Inland waterways ===
The opening of Port-de-Bouc also permitted barge traffic on the Rhône, and on 1 September fourteen LCMs from the attack cargo ships USS Arcturus and Procyon made their way up the Rhône to Arles, where they assisted US and French troops in crossing the river. Consideration was given to using the river to take the pressure of the railways and highways. The Rhône was navigable from Port-Saint-Louis-du-Rhône in the Marseille area as far as Lyon, where it was obstructed by nine demolished bridges. There were two more demolished bridges at Collonges-au-Mont-d'Or, and the river was also obstructed at Uchizy and Tournus. Plans were made to remove the obstructions by 8 November, but plans to use the Rhône were abandoned owing to a shortage of suitable tugs for use on its swift-flowing and relatively shallow waters. The use of inland waterways was restricted to a few hundred tons per day in the Marseille and Port-de-Bouc areas.

=== Air transport ===
The CONAD Air Transport Section commenced operation from Dijon Airport on 9 October. Some air cargo had already been delivered, and steps were taken to forward it. The Air Transport Command initially made two flights per day, one going north and one south. Connections for personnel and air cargo were available to London, Paris, Edinburgh, Lyon, Marseille, Bastia, Naples and Algiers. From there passengers could catch connections to other theaters.

Port clearance in Southern France (1944)
	Discharges		% cleared by ...		
Month	Long tons	Metric tons	road	rail	water
September	129,240	131,310	76	23	1
October	407,263	413,798	57	42	1
November	553,966	562,855	58	40	2

== Supply and services ==
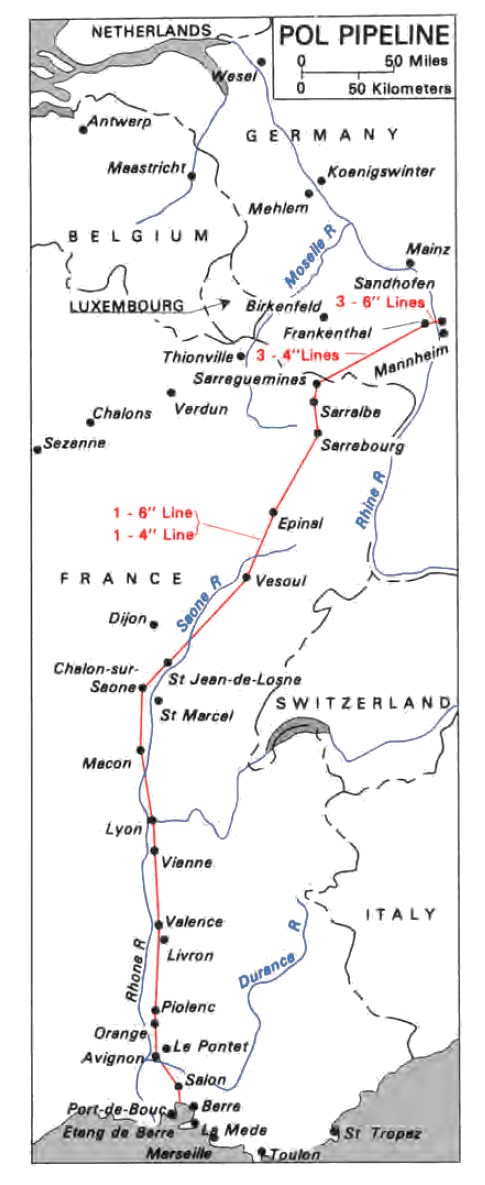

=== POL (petrol, oil and lubricants) ===
The rapid Allied advance inland created a greater than expected demand for POL, with fuel shortages appearing as early as the second day. A ship carrying 50,000 US gallons (190,000 L) of packaged fuel was called forward. By 19 August, the situation had become critical. Forces were operating 100 miles (160 km) from the beaches, and VI Corps was using 100,000 US gallons (380,000 L) of fuel a day, but only 11,000 US gallons (42,000 L) remained in the beach dumps. Seventh Army was forced to prioritize the unloading of fuel, and to restrict consumption by the combat units. Some relief was obtained from captured German fuel dumps at Draguignan, Le Muy, and Digne, and some fuel was recovered from the French refineries in the Port-de-Bouc area. The shortage was alleviated when a tanker with 6 million U.S. gallons (23 Ml) arrived on 27 August. (A large German dump containing 183,000 US gallons (690,000 L) of high-octane gasoline and 36,500 US gallons (138,000 L) of diesel fuel at Besançon was later captured on 9 September.)

The 697th Engineer Petroleum Distribution Company arrived on Camel Green on 15 August. This unit was commanded by Captain Carl W. Bills, an Oklahoma oil man who became the technical supervisor of the pipeline system. Materials for POL storage began arriving on disparate landing craft and beaches on 19 August, and the 697th constructed three 10,000 US barrels (1,200,000 L) storage tanks in Saint-Raphaël, less than 1 mile (1.6 km) from the beach, and connected them to the beach with a 4-inch (10 cm) and a 6-inch (15 cm) pipe. Another 4-inch pipeline connected the docks with a 1,000 US barrels (120,000 L) storage tank for avgas at the airfield at Fréjus. It also built a decanting point where five-US-gallon (20 L) jerry cans could be refilled, and tanker truck dispensing point at Saint-Raphaël, where it refilled up to 7,000 forty-two-US-gallon (160 L) barrels and 5,000 jerry cans per day.

On 26 August, the 697th Engineer Petroleum Distribution Company began running 19 miles (31 km) of 4-inch (10 cm) Victaulic pipe to connect the Lavéra Refinery at Port-de-Bouc, the La Provence refinery at La Mède, and the Berre refinery on the shores of the Etang de Berre. A parallel 4-inch (10 cm) pipeline for avgas was also run from Port-de-Bouc to La Mède, where a 1,000-US-barrel (120,000 L) storage tank was erected. These pipelines were operational by 12 September. The pipeline was extended to Salon-de-Provence. where a road convoy refueling and jerry can refilling point was established. On 25 September the pipeline reached the Durance, where the 697th ran it over a 1,480-foot (450 m) timber trestle bridge. It was then linked to a section completed by the 784th Engineer Petroleum Distribution Company that ran another 32 miles (51 km) to a railway tank car installation at Le Pontet, where another road convoy refueling point was established.

Meanwhile, the 1379th Engineer Petroleum Distribution Company took over responsibility for the tanker discharge facilities at Port-de-Bouc and began laying a 6-inch pipeline around the Etang de Berre, running parallel to the 4-inch pipeline. The 696th Engineer Petroleum Distribution Company arrived in Berre on 21 September, and extended the pipeline to just north of Avignon. From there the 701st Engineer Petroleum Distribution Company, which arrived at Marseille on 9 October, laid pipeline to Piolenc, whence the 696th took over again and continued the work to north of Valence. The Rhône flooded and burst its banks in late October, and the pipe was floated into position. In November, water used to test the pipe for leaks before using it for fuel froze and burst the couplings between Lyon and Mâcon. By this time, 875 miles (1,408 km) of 4-inch and 532 miles (856 km) of 6-inch pipe was in use.

=== Subsistence ===
The loading of ammunition on top of the rations inhibited the timely delivery of food supplies. Although no one went malnourished, many units had to live on K-rations when other forms of rations were temporarily unavailable. Sometimes they had only two instead of three meals a day. During the first month and a half of operations, both the Seventh Army and French Army B lived entirely on packaged rations. Some soldiers were able to supplement their rations with gifts from French farmers or purchases on the black market, but there was a general food shortage in southern France, which did not produce sufficient food to feed itself. This was exacerbated by the retreating Germans gathering up everything they could.

Under the logistical plan, three Liberty ships carrying civil affairs food supplies were to arrive at five-day intervals between D plus 40 and D plus 80. Supplies were initially drawn from theater stockpiles, with later shipments coming directly from the United States. Due to the Seventh Army's rapid advance, the shipments of civil affairs relief supplies were expedited. Emergency food supplies were hastily loaded onto ships in North Africa and Italy, which began arriving on 25 August, and the first of the ships loaded with civil affairs supplies reached the Gulf of Saint-Tropez on 10 September, fifteen days ahead of schedule. By the end of September, 35,000 long tons (36,000 t) of civil affairs relief supplies had been landed in southern France. Meanwhile, the Seventh Army released 100,000 tins of condensed milk and 3,450 pounds (1,560 kg) of dried milk for the children in the region.

American troops did not receive freshly-baked bread until 26 September, and only 5,000 long tons (5,100 t) of refrigeration space was available in Marseille for fresh produce. Refrigerator cars and trucks had not arrived by the end of September, and therefore there were no issues of fresh meat, On 6 October Larkin decreed that five days' supply of subsistence would be kept in the combat zone, fifteen days' supply by CONAD, and anything more by the Delta Base Section. It was expected that total reserves would reach 45 days' supply by December.

Colonel John P. Neu was appointed the quartermaster of the Delta Base Section on 19 October. He created three major distribution centers at Nice, Lyon and Marseille. At Marseille a dump for Class I supplies had been established at the Gare du Prado, but this was surrounded by narrow, crooked city streets that made access difficult for military vehicles. He therefore created a new dump at Rognac, a small town on the Étang de Berre with a railway station. A dump was established next to an olive orchard by the 240th Quartermaster Service Battalion, which was soon joined by the 619th Depot Supply Company, the 3091st Refrigeration Company, and the 4134th Quartermaster Service Battalion. Flatted rations were unloaded at Marseille, and arrived at Rognac by train or barge. Two trains arrived each day that were unloaded with roller conveyors that allowed twelve cars to be unloaded simultaneously. One train was loaded and dispatched each day. About 2,500 US personnel worked at Rognac, along with a battalion of French troops who handled French Army supplies, and 3,000 Italian service troops. The Italians were later replaced by 6,000 German POWs, who also operated a large bakery.

By November 150 reefer cars were operating on the railways, and 2,000 long tons (2,000 t) of cold storage was available in Dijon, but 15 million rations of frozen meat and 18 million rations of butter were in cold storage in Marseille. Since only one mobile refrigeration company was available, combat units received four issues of perishables per week. The 108th Bakery Company arrived on the beaches at Saint-Tropez on 30 August, but was separated from its equipment, and only began baking 32,000 pounds (15,000 kg) fresh bread each day in Vesoul on 26 September. The 178th Bakery Company established itself in Épinal on 2 October, and the 108th joined it there between 19 and 23 October, while the 7553rd (Italian) Bakery Company moved in to Vesoul. The 167th Bakery Company arrived from Italy on 2 September, and took over the operation of two commercial bakeries in Marseille. When CONAD was formed it sent detachments of the 167th to Dijon, Vittel (where the Sixth Army Group had its headquarters), Langres, and Besançon, where they supervised the operation of civilian bakeries.

=== Ammunition ===
A critical ammunition shortage occurred in October. On 2 October, the 3rd Infantry Division's 30th Infantry Regiment reported that it was down to its last 300 rounds of 81 mm M1 mortar ammunition, and was nearly out of M1 Garand rifle ammunition. Rationing was introduced. The division limited expenditure of 60 mm M2 mortar to eight rounds per weapon per day, 81 mm M1 mortar ammunition to eleven rounds per weapon per day, 105 mm howitzer ammunition to thirty-two rounds per gun per day, and 155 mm howitzer ammunition to thirty rounds per gun per day. Even at this restricted rate, ammunition stocks ran short, and the 3rd Infantry Division stripped its support units of ammunition to keep the rifle companies and machine gun platoons in ammunition. For a time there was no rifle ammunition in the Seventh Army's depots.

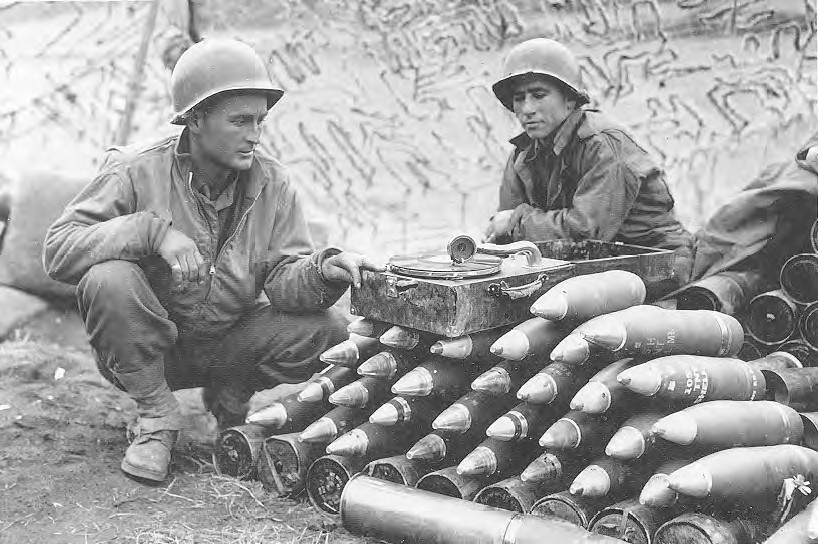
Artillery ammunition in the Vosges

Seventh Army blamed the situation on COMZONE NATOUSA, for failing to deliver the required quantities of ammunition. Ammunition consumption averaged around 1,000 long tons (1,000 t) per day, but some days as little as 20 long tons (20 t). Between 1 and 7 October, Seventh Army put in bids for 750 long tons (760 t) per day of ammunition, and 225 long tons (229 t) per day of other ordnance items, but Sixth Army Group cut this back to 512 long tons (520 t) per day of all classes of ordnance supply. Moreover, what was shipped did not always coincide with what was requested. By the end of the first week of October, Seventh Army's stock of 105 mm howitzer ammunition averaged 5,627 rounds, which worked out to about twelve rounds per gun per day compared with the ETOUSA 40 rounds per gun per day considered a day's supply. (NATOUSA allotted 50 rounds per gun per day.) Similarly, the availability of 155 mm howitzer ammunition was about 15 rounds per day instead of 25. The decline had occurred in spite of rationing. Due to uncertainty of receipts, Seventh Army abandoned rationing after the first two weeks of October and instead instituted a system whereby it advised VI Corps of the available ammunition on a daily basis.

Receipts rose as the railways were brought into operation, allowing reserves to be built up. By 28 October, the Seventh Army depots held 8.2 days' supply of 105 mm M2, 8.8 days' of 155 mm howitzer, 9.8 days' of 155 mm gun M1 and 7.4 days' of 81 mm mortar, but there were still supply issues with 105 mm howitzer ammunition, and stocks declined to 3.8 days' supply by 27 November. Part of the problem was the transfer of the XV Corps from the Third United States Army with its artillery assets but without the requisitions for its ammunition from the War Department. Additional shipments were made to cover this. Ammunition expenditures in November were high; Seventh Army's 648 105 mm howitzers fired 49 rounds per gun per day. On 17 November, the War Department announced that ammunition expenditures in all theaters of war had exceeded production, resulting in a depletion of stocks in the United States, and it reduced a day's supply to 18 rounds per gun per day. This was the result of cutbacks ordered in 1943 in response to the Truman Committee's criticism of what it regarded as excessive stocks of ammunition in NATOUSA.

=== Ordnance ===
Material losses during the pursuit were high. Between 15 August and the end of the year, Seventh Army wrote off 213 medium tanks, 63 light tanks and 158 other armored vehicles. By the end of the year the Seventh Army reported that it was short 25 M8 armored cars, 15 M10 tank destroyers, three M36 tank destroyers, 53 M4 Sherman tanks with 75 mm or 76 mm guns, 26 M4 Sherman tanks with 105 mm howitzers, and 72 T41 armored utility vehicles. This exceeded its ability to provide replacements. Losses of other vehicles were also high: 302 GMC CCKW 2½-ton 6×6 trucks and 627 ¼-ton trucks (jeeps). By the end of the year it was still short 115 ¼-ton trucks, 305 1½-ton trucks and 321 2½-ton 6×6 trucks.

Weapons lost included 327 .30-caliber machine guns, 278 M2 Browning .50-caliber machine guns, 1,824 Thompson submachine guns, 2,684 M1911 .45-caliber pistols, 4,701 M1 carbines, 585 BARs and 3,949 M1 Garand semi-automatic rifles. Losses of artillery pieces were not as severe, but were keenly felt. They included five 75 mm pack howitzers, ten 105 mm howitzers, eleven 155 mm howitzers and four 155 mm guns. By the end of the year all losses had been replaced except for the .30-caliber machine guns, which were on order.

The 77th Ordnance Depot Company supporting the Seventh Army's 43rd and 45th Ordnance Battalion had difficulty obtaining spare parts from the depots, which were still around the beaches. Some 300 civilian vehicles that the Germans had confiscated were found in a warehouse in Besançon, and about a third of them were given a coat of olive drab paint and pressed into service as staff and command cars. By October, the Seventh Army area was filled with civilian and captured German vehicles, often ingeniously repaired or adapted by ordnance units.

=== Medical services ===
The 52nd, 56th and 58th Medical Battalions landed on 15 August to supplement the organic medical units of the divisions. Between 15 and 18 August 2,996 casualties were admitted to hospitals, of whom 17 died, 199 returned to duty, and 2,229 were evacuated. Casualties on D-Day were evacuated to the 40th Station Hospital in Corsica by LSTs, from whence serious cases were flown to Naples. Starting on 16 August, three hospital ships began taking casualties to Naples. Hospital ships carried surgical teams drawn from the 3rd, 36th, and 43rd General Hospitals and the 59th Evacuation Hospital. Air evacuation of casualties to Naples from airfields near the beaches was instituted on 22 August by the 802d and 807th Medical Air Evacuation Transport Squadrons. Thereafter the hospital ships carried mostly French patients, who were taken to Oran. After the capture of Marseille, French casualties remained in France, and the use of hospital ships was discontinued on 30 August. The use of air evacuation declined in September as flying conditions deteriorated and facilities became available in southern France. Between 22 August and 7 November, 7,377 patients were evacuated to Italy by air. Another 9,878 were evacuated by air to Istres, an airbase near Marseille.

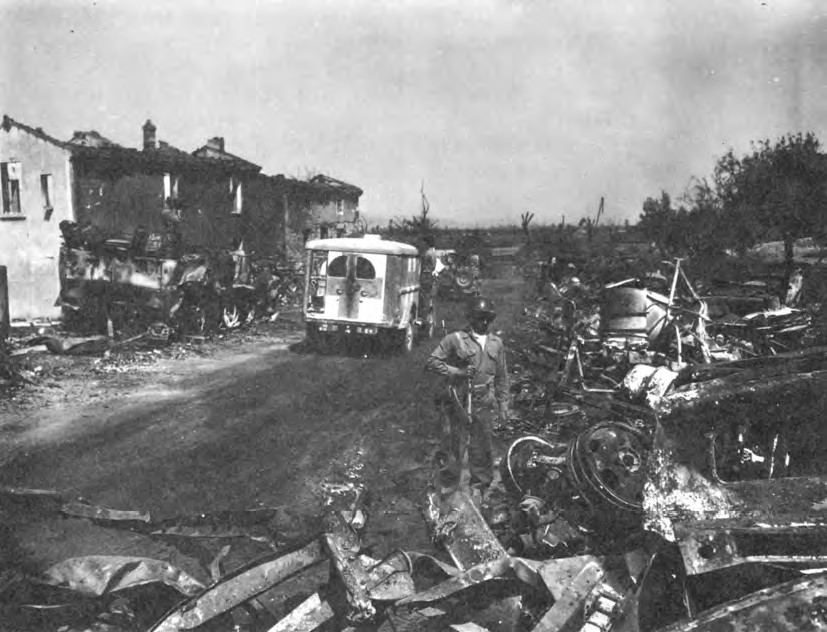
Ambulance passing through demolished village near Montélimar

Three 400-bed evacuation hospitals, the 11th, 93rd and 95th Evacuation Hospitals, one for each division, were in operation by 19 August, when United States Army Nurse Corps personnel began arriving in southern France. Four large 750-bed evacuation hospitals, the 9th, 27th, 51st and 59th Evacuation Hospitals, arrived between 25 and 27 August. In the original plan they were to provide services to the French Army B, but after the capture of Marseille French medical officers found that they could take advantage of civilian hospitals in the vicinity, and the large evacuation hospitals were primarily used to treat US troops. Like other logistical units, the hospitals had difficulty keeping up with the pace of the advance. Long lines of evacuation to the rear often left the hospitals overcrowded when there was a sudden surge of casualties. Resources were further strained when hospitals often had to leave detachments behind to care for immobile cases when they moved forward. They made use of civilian personnel in many capacities, but particularly as stretcher bearers.

The 11th Evacuation Hospital moved from Le Muy to Aspremont, where it admitted 300 patients on its first day of operation. The 9th Evacuation Hospital opened in Beaumont-en-Diois, about 30 miles (48 km) further down the road to Crest. Within 24 hours of opening it had admitted 260 patients and performed 39 surgical operations. On 1 September, the 93rd Evacuation Hospital displaced forward to Rives, where it admitted 127 patients and performed 28 surgical procedures in 12 hours. Except for the 27th Evacuation Hospital, which took the train, all had to move using their own organic transport and what they could borrow. By the end of September all were clustered near the highway from Besançon to Epinal. The last two weeks of September were cold and wet, and only with difficulty could the patients be kept warm. Air evacuation from Ambérieu-en-Bugey became possible on 9 September, but the deteriorating weather made it uncertain.

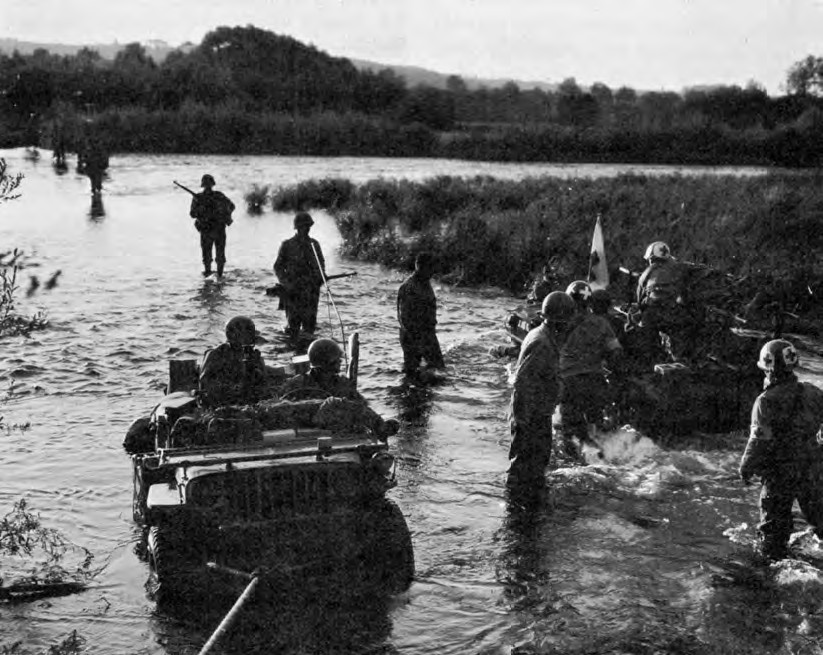
Jeep ambulance bringing wounded back across the Moselle

Once the railways became operational again, hospital trains began running. The 42nd Hospital Train, which had served in North Africa and Italy, made its first run between Mouchard and Marseille on 25 September. It was followed by the 66th Hospital Train, another veteran of the Italian campaign, which made its first run on 9 October. Both used reconditioned French passenger cars. The first fixed hospital to open in southern France was the 36th General Hospital, which opened in a former German hospital at Les Milles on 17 September and in Aix-en-Provence two days later. It moved to Dijon on 13 October, where it opened in a former French cavalry barracks, while the site at Les Milles was occupied by the 43rd General Hospital and that in Aix-en-Provence. Within a week the 36th General Hospital had 1,400 patients. It was followed by the 46th General Hospital, which opened at Caserne Vauban near Besançon on 20 September; the 21st General Hospital, which opened in an unfinished French psychiatric hospital at Mirecourt on 21 October; and the 23d General Hospital, which opened at Vittel on 5 November. By 20 November, CONAD hospitals had 5,000 beds and the Delta Base Section hospitals had 9,250 beds. In addition, a special hospital, the 7607th Station Hospital (Italian) cared for Italian service units.

By end of September, US Army hospitals in southern France had admitted 20,775 patients, of whom 160 had died, 8,380 had been evacuated to Italy or North Africa, and 8,525 had been returned to duty, leaving 3,710 in the hospitals. Around this time, neuropsychiatric (combat fatigue) cases began to rise, and with the deteriorating weather trench foot also started to become a problem. A dedicated neuropsychiatric hospital, the 51st Station Hospital, opened at Auxonne on 4 November.

During the first sixty days of the campaign medical supplies were drawn from NATOUSA; after that they came directly from the United States. Medical supply was handled by the 7th Medical Depot Company, which followed the Seventh Army's advance. It had to haul supplies from the beaches with its own transport until November, when CONAD opened an intermediate medical depot in Dijon. The Seventh Army also had its own blood service in the form of the 6703rd Blood Transfusion Unit. Blood was initially flown in from Naples, but after 29 October it was drawn from service troops in the Delta Base Section. When supplies ran low in late October, additional blood was flown in from the ETO stocks in Paris. The use of blood transfusions to treat shock resulted in higher usage than the medical authorities in the United States had anticipated. The Air Transport Command began flying blood from the United States to the UK in August. Starting in October supplies were flown directly to Orly Field near Paris.

=== Other activities ===
A dump for class II and IV (clothing and general supplies) was established at Miramas at a site built by the French Army during World War I for ammunition storage. The 622nd Railhead Company arrived there on 17 November, followed by the 240th Supply Depot Company on 26 November. Daily trains departed from there for depots to the north, and there were often urgent requests that required loads to be prepared for air delivery. Supplies were supplemented by local purchases, which were estimated to have saved 9,634 measurement tons (10,912 m^{3}) of shipping in the final quarter of 1944. The 814th Sterilization and Bath Company and 7071st and 7171st Laundry Companies took over a large plant with fourteen buildings that they brought into operation as a laundry by 6 October, and the 223rd Salvage Collecting Company and 3068th Salvage Repair Company opened a scrap metal yard at Frejus using POW labor.

Soldiers had been landed with the lightest possible packs, and shipments of clothing had been delayed in favor of rations and POL. The sudden onset of cold and wet weather in early September led to urgent requests for winter clothing and footwear. The problem was exacerbated by the addition of XV Corps, since requisitions had been made on the basis of the Dragoon troop list. Under the circumstances, the Seventh Army quartermaster decided that each command would receive 75 percent of its allotment, with combat troops being the first to get winter clothing. By the end of October each man in a combat unit had received an overcoat, two sets of woolen underwear, an extra blanket, a pair of woolen gloves, a pair of shoe-pacs (rubberized boots) and three pairs of ski socks. The infantry considered the overcoats to be too heavy, and the armored troops considered them too bulky. Combat units preferred the M1943 field jacket, worn with a high-necked sweater underneath. Issues of these commenced in late October, and the 3rd Infantry Division managed to amass enough of them to equip all of its infantry battalions. By the end of October all infantry divisions had received a full issue of sleeping bags and winter clothing, and 97 percent of their shoe-pacs.

== Outcome ==
The primary objective of Operation Dragoon was the capture of the ports of Marseille and Toulon, and in this it was successful. It was estimated that the ports in northern France could support up to 35 divisions, while those in southern France support another 35. As 68 divisions were assigned to SHAEF in 1945, both were required. In October, three divisions scheduled for shipment to northern France were diverted to Marseille. The port of Marseille ultimately handled more cargo than any other port in Allied hands. There was much debate, before and after, about the relative merits of Operation Dragoon versus retaining the forces in Italy. Dragoon stripped Italy of troops, supplies, shipping and support that was needed to carry on the fight there.

Logistical problems arose from over-insurance against German resistance and not providing for a more agile pursuit of the retreating Germans, but the fighting in October (and even more dramatic events in December) demonstrated that the German propensity for fighting had not been overestimated. What the logistical plan lacked was flexibility, which was difficult to achieve within the constraints of the global shipping situation and a theater-wide shortage of logistical units. This was offset by the experience that staffs and troops in the North African Theater of Operations had gained carrying out active operations for nearly two years. Nonetheless, logistical constraints prevented the operational commanders from taking full advantage of the opportunities offered by the German retreat.

== See also ==
- American logistics in the Northern France campaign
