= Howard Becker =

Howard Becker may refer to:

- Howard P. Becker (1899–1960), American sociologist
- Howard S. Becker (1928–2023), American sociologist
- Howard D. Becker (1914–1995), American painter and watercolorist
