= Howard Parrish =

United States Army officer, recipient of the Legion of Merit (1891–1965)

- Born: 1891
- Died: 1965 (aged 73–74)
- Burial place: Sunset Hills Cemetery; Valdosta, Georgia
- Military career
- Allegiance: United States
- Branch: United States Army
- Rank: Colonel
- Units: Transportation Corps, Delta Base Section, 6th Port Headquarters
- Commands: 6th Port Headquarters
- Conflicts: World War I; European theatre of World War II
- Awards: Silver Star; Purple Heart; Legion of Merit; Bronze Star Medal; European-African-Middle Eastern Campaign Medal; Meritorious Service Medal

Howard Parrish, was a United States Army officer who saw service during World War I and World War II. During World War II, he commanded the Sixth Port Headquarters, Transportation Corps.

As Commander of the 6th Port, Col. Howard Parrish arrived at Casablanca on 19 November 1942 with the first troops, the 382nd and the 384th Battalions. He was in command until mid-January 1943, still remaining with the 6th Port and was renamed Commander in 1945.

== Early life ==
Howard Parrish was born in 1891, the son of Jesse Absolom Parrish.and his wife. He had two brothers, Roscoe T. Parrish, a postal worker who served in United States Navy, and Aubern Parrish. The family was raised in Valdosta, Georgia.

== World War I ==
In 1918, with the rank of Lieutenant Parrish arrived in France with his regiments.

At the conclusion of World War I, Parrish held the rank of captain. For his service Parrish received a Silver Star and from being wounded in the line of duty, he received a Purple Heart.

== Career 1918-1940 ==
In 1918, Parrish was assistant cashier of the Valdosta Bank & Trust Co. in 1919, he relocated to work at a bank in Atlanta. He was the vice president of the Atlanta Commercial Bank for 10 years, and continued as manager of the Marietta Street branch.

== World War II, 6th Port Headquarters ==
In 1940, Col Howard Parrish was called back into service for the United States Army. He was stationed at Jacksonville, Florida and Fort Hamilton. With his wife and son, Howard Parrish Jr., he moved to Jacksonville, Florida where he was on active duty with headquarters of Second Military Area. He was then appointed as the commander of the 6th Port Headquarters, bringing the first large contingent of service troops to Casablanca. They landed on 19 November 1942. While the two port battalions, 382nd and 384th, did not have experience or training working on a water front, within a short time they began working. The 6th Port operated directly under Col. Walter J. Muller, General Patton's G-4 of the Western Task Force. Officers of General Patton's staff issued direct orders to 6th Port officers, which Col. Parrish considered it to not be in the general order of command, which created some friction between Muller and Parrish. On December 2, 1942, Muller put Colonel Tank in charge of port operations with Parrish remaining until January 1943. Col. Parrish questioned and protested this order, and appealed it to the higher command, the Chief of Transportation. While the protest did not result in any changed in his favor, in December 1945, Parrish was renamed commander of the 6th Port.

In 1943, Parrish received the Legion of Merit "for exceptional meritorious conduct in performance of outstanding service" while serving in North Africa.

== Personal ==
Colonel Parrish had one son, Howard Parrish Jr., who attended George Tech.
