= 6th Port Headquarters =

United States Army branch

6th Port
- Active: 31 July 1942 – 24 May 1946
- Country: United States of America
- Branch: United States Army
- Garrison/HQ: Fort Gregg-Adams, Virginia, U.S.
- Engagements: World War II
- Decorations: Meritorious Service Medal

Commanders
- Colonel of the regiment: R. Hunter Clarkson

The 6th Port of Embarkation, Headquarters Company was a combat service support unit of the United States Army serving the Transportation Corps and the Quartermaster Corps during World War II, under the command of Col. R. Hunter Clarkson, Transportation Officer of the Delta Base Section.

The 6th Port worked the ports of French Morocco, French Algeria, Italy and France, and was responsible for the movement of troops and supplies, loading and unloading the ships, and looking after 50,000 troops.

In 1945, the unit was awarded the Meritorious Service Plaque for superior performance in control and execution of its port missions.

== Fort Hamilton and North Africa ==
The 6th Port was activated at Fort Hamilton, Brooklyn, New York in 1942. On November 2, the 6th Port departed the Brooklyn Navy Yard, New York Port of Embarkation as part of Operation Torch under General Eisenhower, to support the Invasion of North Africa.

The departure of the 6th Port, with the 382nd and 384th Port Battalions, was under the command of Col. Howard Parrish though en route they were given orders to report to Col. Walter J. Muller, General Patton's G-4 of the Western Task Force. On December 2, 1942, Muller put Colonel Tank in charge of port operations with Parrish remaining until January 1943.

On November 8, 1942, The Western Task Force landed in Casablanca. The 6th Port arrived in a convoy of ships carrying 32,000 service troops and thirty days' supply of Quartermaster items, waiting in the harbor for the Battle of Casablanca to be over.

The 6th Port landed on November 19, 1942 and operated the ports of Casablanca, Fedala, and Safi until September 1943. In January 1943, the unit was put under the Atlantic Base Section with the 379th Port Battalion joining them that month and the 480th Port Battalion arriving in February.

== Naples ==
The unit was then divided, with a detachment arriving in Salerno on September 17 to handle the landing of troops and supplies over the beach until the Port of Naples was secured by the Allies.

On 2 October, the Fifth United States Army under Brig. Gen Arthur Pence, former commander of the Eastern Base Section, along with Transportation Officer Colonel R. Hunter Clarkson and his 6th Port, arrived in Naples, where they found the harbor was filled with sunken ships, extensive damage to rail facilities, buildings that had been demolished, no electricity, obstructions blocking the roads and rails, and civilians without food.

The 6th Port took over sole command of the Port of Naples from the British on November 1, followed by nearby Salerno, Castellammare di Stabia and Torre Annunziata. Clarkson brought in cargo nets, pallets, fork-lift trucks, and cranes from Palermo. Electricity from three Italian submarines were used. The port became operational in a matter of months.

March 1944, while the 6th Port was stationed in Naples, Mount Vesuvius, the volcano in the Bay of Naples, erupted for over a week, spewing hazardous volcanic ash over the area. US Army officer Lieutenant-Colonel J. Leslie Kincaid coordinated an evacuation and documented the Vesuvius Emergency Operation.

== Marseille ==
In August 1944, the 6th Port embarked for the Allied invasion of Southern France. Following a visit to Port de Bouc, already liberated, Col. R Hunter Clarkson and a Sixth Port advance party arrived in Marseille. The port had not yet been demined, as recalled by Clarkson's driver, who was quoted as saying "I just followed the road and prayed".

September 8, Marseille and Toulon were captured. The 6th Port arrived to operate the port, along with equipment and personnel on three Liberty ships. 6th Port brought in cranes from Naples and started operating the port at Marseille on September 9 handling 1,219 long tons the first day, which increased in 37 days to 19,000 tons a day. They operated the Port of Marseille until surrender was signed in May 1945.

Clarkson appointed Cpl. Howard D. Becker as documentary artist, to paint and sketch the history of the occupation and reconstruction of the Port of Marseille.

December 1945, Col. Howard Parrish was named commander of the 6th Port.

== 6th Port Activities ==
Upon landing at Marseilles August 25, 1944, the Special Service Section of Sixth Port requisitioned the Cinema Alcazar theater, renovated and opened it for the troops 24 days later. The Sixth Port Revue in Marseilles featured the Jolly Rogers band from the 394th Port Battalion, Lenny Malocco who had appeared at Radio City Music Hall, the Port Swingsters, and soon after, a Franco-American revue starring French Maurice Chevalier and Django Reinhardt and his band. The Soviet-Yank Revue followed, featuring the Red Army band and the Sixth Port Swingsters.

The 6th Port put on the first All-Star Jam recording session in southern France. In collaboration with French record producer and impresario Hugues Panassié, the shows were recorded and broadcast.

The 42-piece military band of the 6th Port played at the Port Track Finals.

== Deactivation ==
The unit was deactivated on May 24, 1946, in France.

== Recognition ==
The 6th Port was awarded the Meritorious Service Plaque for superior performance in control and execution of its port missions on 15 January 1945.

== Members ==
Members of the 6th Port include:

Howard D. Becker, (1914-1995), documentary artist assigned by Col. R. Hunter Clarkson to 6th Port Headquarters, Becker painted and sketched the history of the occupation and reconstruction of the port. His watercolor painting "Assembly Plant", Cazes, Morocco, 1946, appears in “Soldiers Serving The Nation”, in The US Army Art Collection and several of his works are at the Historical Properties Section in Washington, D.C.

R. Hunter Clarkson, Brigadier General

A. I. Henderson, Colonel

Harold Kathman, Lieutenant

Stanley W. Kiger, Lieutenant Colonel - Bronze Star Medal, DBS

Howard Parrish, Colonel

B.H. Shipe, Lieutenant Colonel

Murray Seeman, Captain

Saul Ziff, JA Section – Bronze Star Medal, DBS,

Martin Hanson, Corporal, U.S. Troops in France, maintenance and repair section

Edwin Kurzen

Hulbert M. "Mike" Gallagher

Luther Warsing, Staff Sergeant

James S. Erwin, second lieutenant

== 6th Port locations ==
=== North Africa ===
Casablanca

Fedala

Safi

=== Italy ===
Paestum

Salerno

Naples

Torre Annunziate

Castellammare di Stabia

Baia

Bagnoli

Nisida

Pozzouli

Anzio

Piambino

Citavecchia

Leghor

=== France ===
Beaches

Alpha

Camel

Cavaliere

Toulon

Port de Bouc

St. Tropez

St. Raphael

Nice

Marseille

=== Tunisia ===
Bizerte
