= Saint-Tropez beaches =

Beaches in Saint-Tropez, France

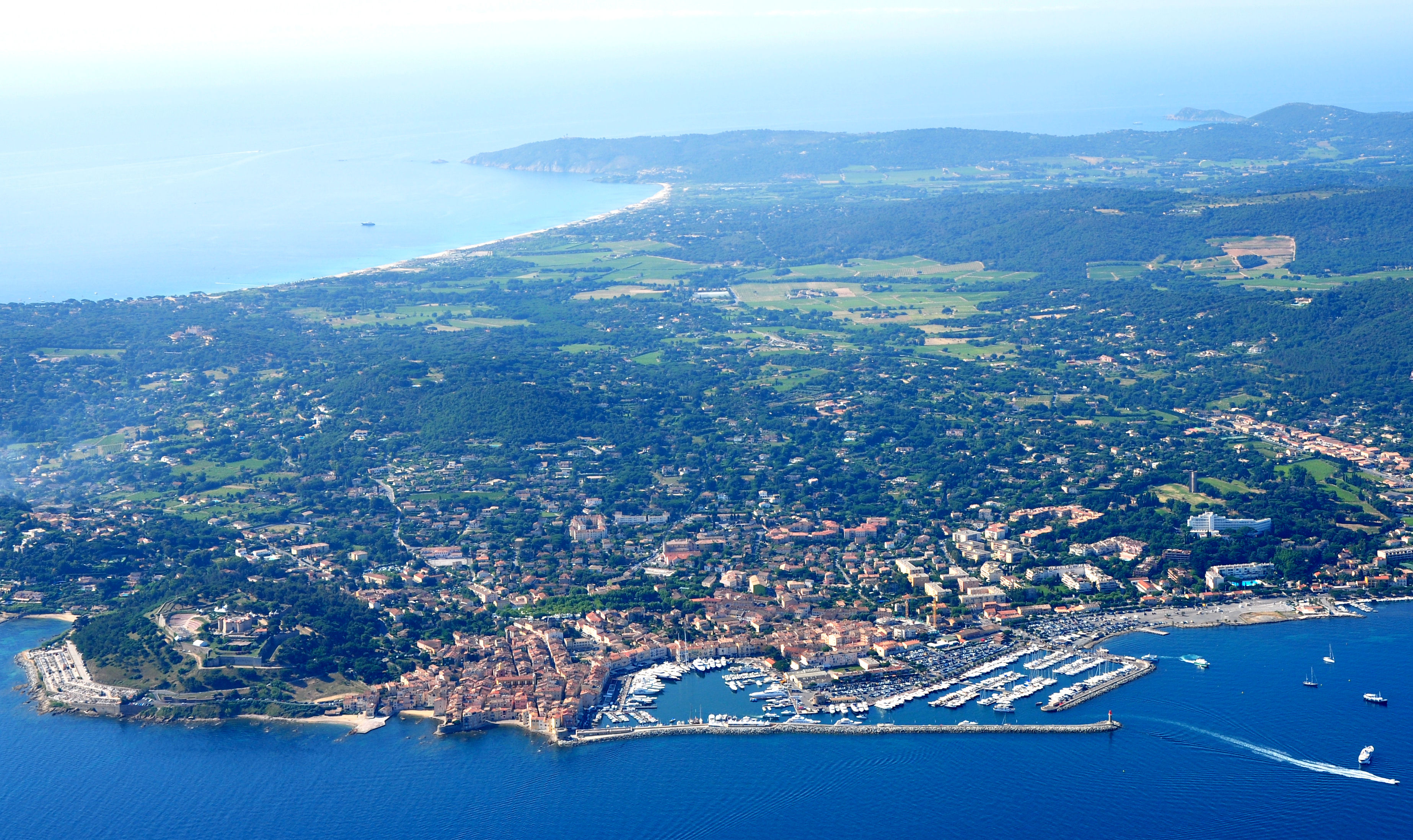
Aerial view of Saint-Tropez in June, with marked Pampelonne beach in background.

The beaches of Saint-Tropez, France, are generally divided in three parts: in-town beaches, Pampelonne beach and other nearby beaches.

== In-town beaches ==
They consist of La Glaye, La Ponche and La Fontanette. As Saint Tropez is several hundred years old, the three beaches are small or even tiny and they are located near the heart of the village.

== Pampelonne beach ==
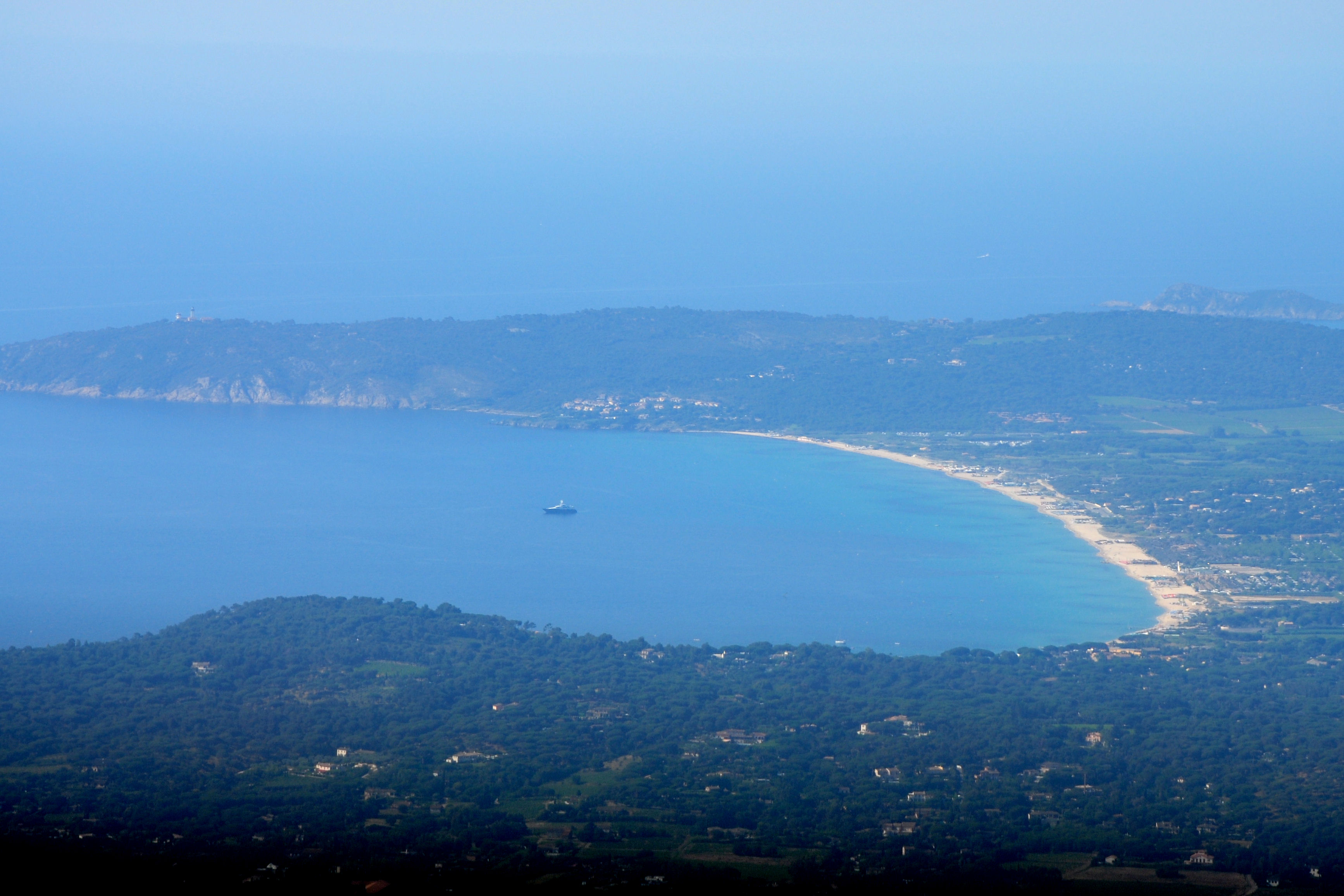
Pampelonne aerial view from north to south

Pampelonne is the kind of beach considered a Saint-Tropez beach by most people. It is a long, mostly sandy beach, located about 5 km south-east to Saint-Tropez. Only half of the beach belongs to the commune of Saint-Tropez, but famous beach clubs – strictly speaking located in Ramatuelle – often use the term Saint-Tropez beach.

Most parts of the beach have their own parking lots, toilets, showers, changing facilities, cafes, restaurants, lifeguard patrols, rentable sun-loungers and wind-surfing opportunities.

Most of the famous clubs are located on Pampelonne beach. These include: Bagatelle, Club 55, La Voile Rouge (a resort for the rich and famous (renamed Latoya, and after a ten-year legal battle, destroyed in December 2011), Nikki Beach, and Verde.

=== Plage de Tahiti ===
This beach was popularised in the film And God Created Woman with Brigitte Bardot. Developed a tradition of being clothing-optional. Though the mayor once attempted to ban topless sunbathing, it has since become common across the Pampelonne coast and the town’s port area.The beach is accessed by heading to the Bay of Pampelonne and walking to the northern section of Pampelonne Beach. It is accessible via an unpaved road.

== Other nearby beaches ==
These include other beaches, considered near, and linked to Saint-Tropez. They include:

=== Plage de la Bouillabaisse ===
It is located beyond the port and car park and offers views across the bay to the Maures mountains.

=== Plage des Salins ===
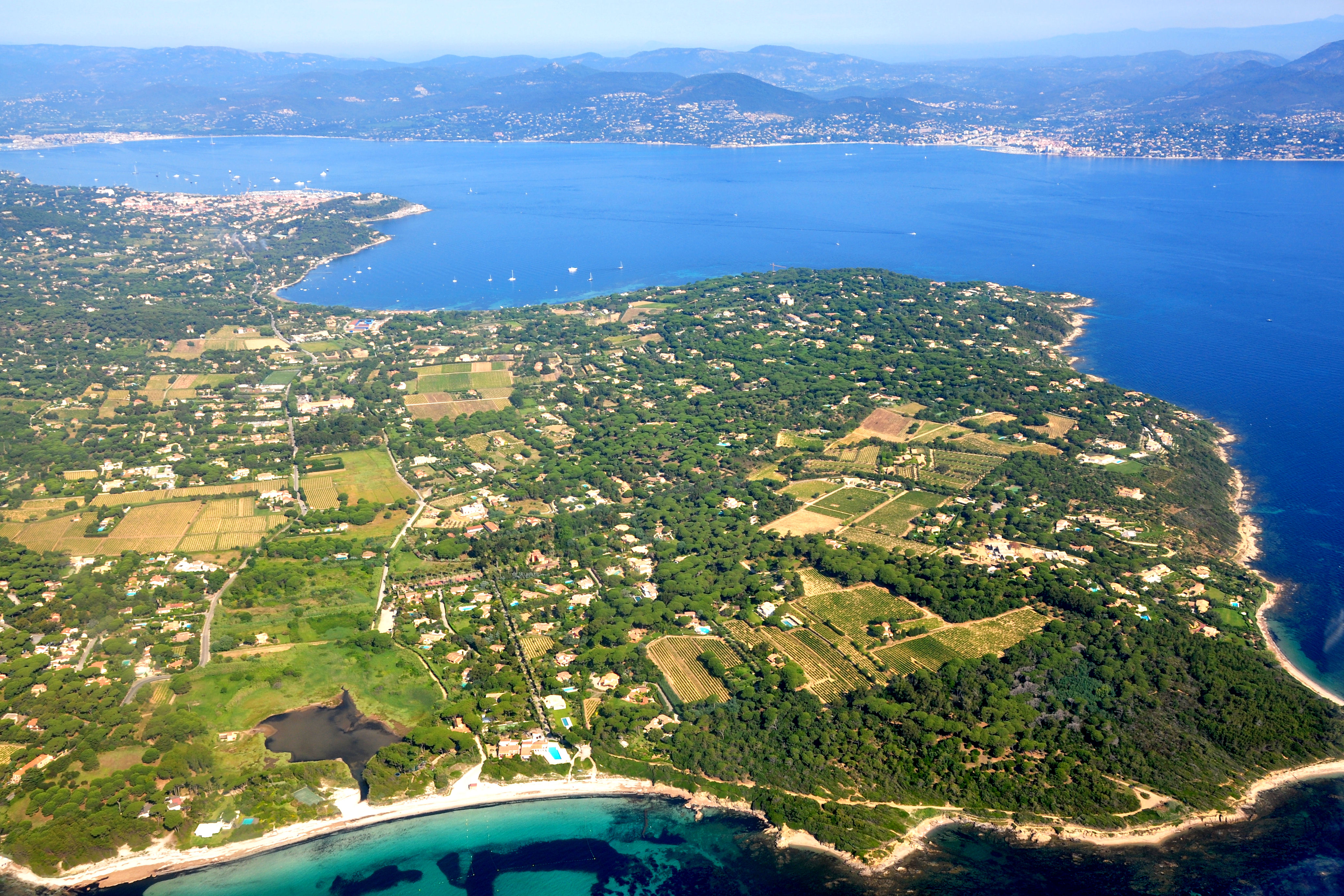
Aerial view of Plage des Salins - front left of image

Plage des Salins is sometimes wrongly included as part of Pampelonne.
