= R. Hunter Clarkson =

Scottish brigadier general (died 1962)

Robert Hunter Clarkson
- Died: 1 July 1962; Coronado Island, California
- Burial place: Fort Rosecrans National Cemetery
- Spouse: Louise Ingalls Barnard Wells (wife)
- Children: Lois C. Duval (daughter); Robert H. Clarkson (son)
- Military career
- Allegiance: Great Britain United States of America
- Branch: British Armed Forces Transportation Corps; Sixth Port Headquarters; United States Army
- Service years: 1914–1920; United States 1942–1945
- Rank: Brigadier general Three stars
- Nickname: R. Hunter Clarkson
- Units: Transportation Corps, Delta Base Section, 6th Port Headquarters
- Commands: 6th Port Headquarters
- Conflicts: World War I; European theatre of World War II
- Awards: Military Cross; Bronze Star Medal; Order of the Crown of Italy; European-African-Middle Eastern Campaign Medal; Meritorious Service Medal; Croix de Guerre; Legion of Honor

Robert Hunter Clarkson, was a native of Scotland, who served as a major in the British Armed Forces in World War I and as commander of the Sixth Port Headquarters, Transportation Corps in the US Army in World War II. Under his command, the 6th Port was awarded the Meritorous Service Medal for superior performance in control and execution of its port missions. Clarkson was awarded the Legion of Merit, among many awards. He was commissioned a brigadier general in 1949.

Clarkson served in British Army in World War I in the Royal Garrison Artillery Unit of the British Expeditionary Force in Palestine and Egypt from 1914 to 1920.

After his service in the British Army in World War I, Clarkson moved to Santa Fe, New Mexico. He became Chief of Transportation for the Fred Harvey Company, founding the Indian Detour Transportation Company in 1924, after Harvey acquired a local tour company. The Indian Detour was an sightseeing trip featuring the romance, mystery and landscape behind the railroad tracks of New Mexico and in the Indian Southwest.

At a Rotary Club Meeting he announced "We are interested in only one road and that is the National Old Trails and a good road from it to Grand Canyon, the latter to be built wherever the people of this county and the park service decide it should be built".

== United States Army, Transportation Corps, Sixth Port Headquarters ==
In December 1942, Clarkson was called to serve in the United States Army and appointed major in the Transportation Corps Delta Base Section. He was connected with the 6th Port of Embarkation since early operations in North Africa and assigned as commander while the 6th Port was at Naples.

In 1949, Clarkson was commissioned as a brigadier general.

== Personal life ==
In 1947, Clarkson moved to Coronado Island, California. He was married to Louise née Wells.

== Death ==
Clarkson died at Coronado Island, California on July 1, 1962.
