= 121st =

121st may refer to:

- 121st Air Refueling Wing, an aerial refueling organization assigned to the Ohio Air National Guard
- 121st Battalion (disambiguation), several military units
- 121st Squadron (disambiguation), several military units
- 121st Division (disambiguation), several military units
- 121st IOC Session, held in Denmark in 2009, where the host city of the 2016 Summer Olympics was selected
- 121st meridian east, 121° east of Greenwich, a line of longitude through Asia, the Indian Ocean and Australia
- 121st meridian west, 121° west of Greenwich, a line of longitude through North America and the Pacific Ocean
- 121st Regiment (disambiguation), several military units
- 121st Street (disambiguation), several locations
- 121st Weather Flight, a subordinate unit of the 113th Wing of the United States Air Force
