= 121st Division =

In military terms, 121st Division or 121st Infantry Division may refer to:

- 121st Infantry Division (German Empire)
- 121st Infantry Division (Wehrmacht), German unit in World War II
- 121st Division (Imperial Japanese Army)
- 121st Motor Rifle Division, Russia
- 121st Rifle Division, Soviet Union
- 121st Guards Rifle Division, Soviet Union

== See also ==
- List of military divisions by number
- 121st Brigade (disambiguation)
- 121st Regiment (disambiguation)
- 121st Battalion (disambiguation)
- 121st Squadron (disambiguation)
- 121st (disambiguation)
