= 121st Battalion =

121st Battalion may refer to:

- 121st Battalion (Western Irish), CEF, Canadian Expeditionary Force
- 121st Engineer Battalion (United States)
- 121st Signal Battalion (United States)

== See also ==
- 121st Brigade (disambiguation)
- 121st Division (disambiguation)
- 121st Regiment (disambiguation)
