= Operation Blackstone =

- Part of Operation Torch of the North African campaign of World War II
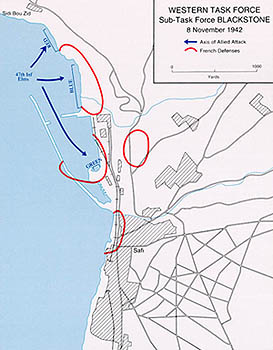
- A map showing landings during the operation
Date	8–10 November 1942
Location	Safi, French Morocco
Result	American victory: Americans occupy the port of Safi and repel French reinforcements; American forces advance north toward Casablanca

Belligerents
United States	Vichy France: Morocco

Commanders and leaders
(United States) Ernest N. Harmon	(France) Unknown

Strength
Ground forces: 6,400 troops Naval activity: 8 warships 6 transports	Ground forces: 300 troops 3 tanks shore batteries and artillery pieces

Casualties and losses
US: 3 dead 25 wounded	France: 300 troops captured

Operation Blackstone was a part of Operation Torch, the Allied landings in North Africa during World War II. The operation called for American amphibious troops to land at and capture the French-held port of Safi in French Morocco. The landings were carried out by the 47th Infantry Regiment of the U.S. Army and took place on the morning of 8 November 1942 as part of a larger operation to capture Casablanca.

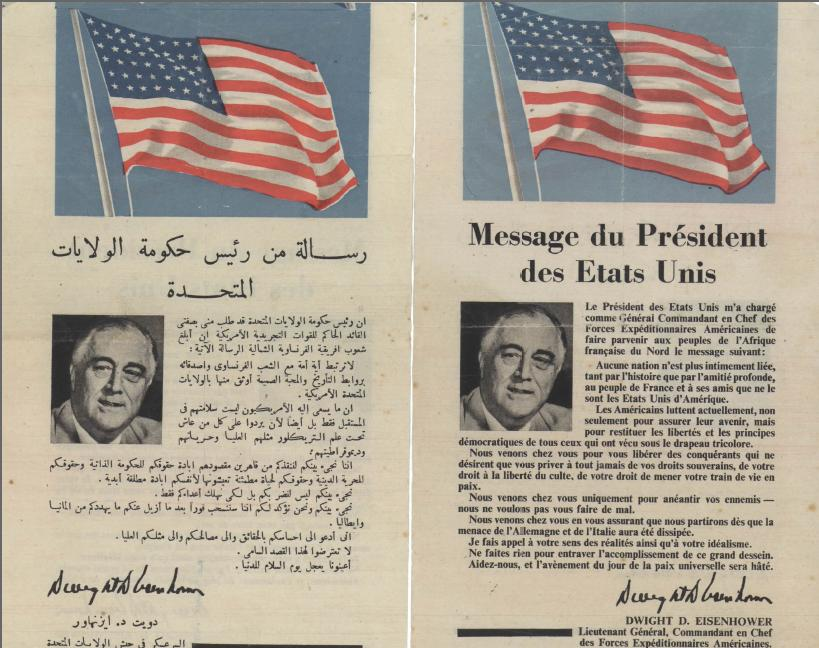
Flyer that was distributed by the Allied forces in the streets of Casablanca, calling for civilians to cooperate with the Allied forces

The landings from converted destroyers were mostly successful. They were initially conducted without covering fire, hoping that the French might not resist at all. When coastal batteries opened fire, the fleet returned fire. When commanding General Harmon arrived French snipers had pinned the assault troops (most of whom were in combat for the first time) on the beaches. Most of the landings occurred behind schedule; air support from the carriers destroyed a French convoy of trucks intended to reinforce the defenses.

Safi surrendered on the afternoon of 8 November, but sporadic resistance continued until 10 November when the remaining defenders were pinned down and the bulk of Harmon's forces raced to join the siege of Casablanca.

== See also ==
- US Naval Bases North Africa
- 17th Armored Engineer Battalion
- 82nd Armored Reconnaissance Battalion
