= US Naval Bases North Africa =

World War II US Naval bases in North Africa

- Part of the North African campaign of the Second World War
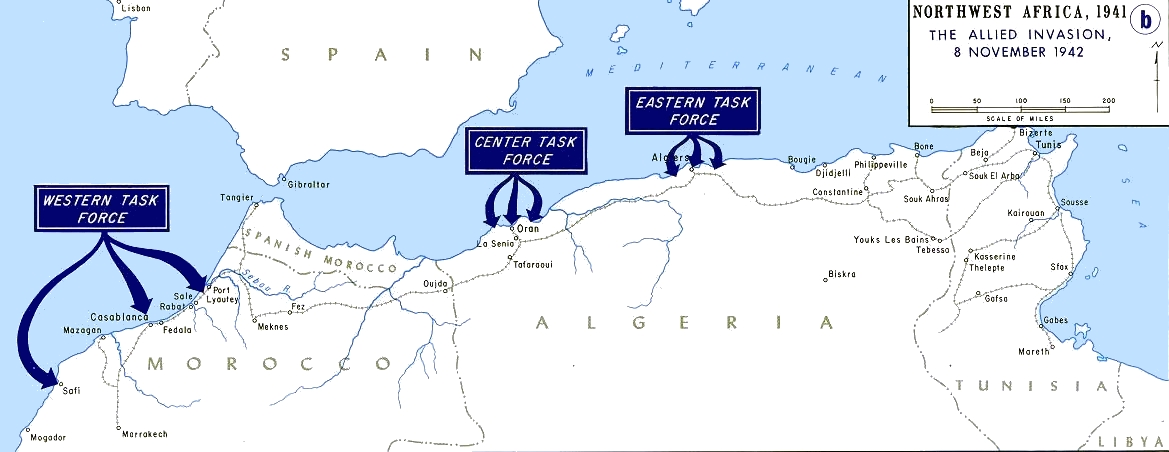
- Landings during the operation, sites of United States Navy Bases
Date	May 1942 to 1945
Location	French Morocco, French Algeria, French Tunisia, French West Africa

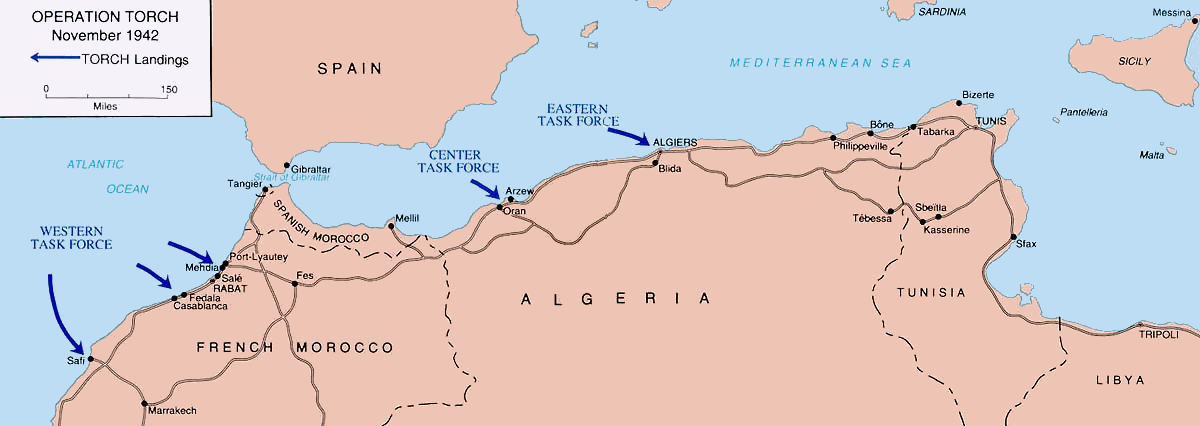
Operation Torch and the US Navy base ports

US Naval Bases in North Africa were sea ports and air base used in North Africa during World War II by the United States Navy. The ports and air bases supplied the troops of the Allies armies in the flight against German and Italian forces in the North African campaign and Western Desert campaign. Later the bases supported the invasion of Italy. The ports and airfields were used after their surrender in Operation Torch. Amphibious Training Bases (ATB) were built in Algeria and Tunisia to prepare for the upcoming invasions. Seabees, United States Naval Construction Battalions, did most of the repair work, new construction, and maintaining work at the bases.

== Background ==
Algeria became a French colony in 1830 after France invaded and captured Algiers. After the fall of France to the Nazi Germany and then under Vichy France rule, Algeria and French North Africa came under German control. The Allies freed Algeria of Nazi rule with Operation Torch that started on November 8, 1942. Operation Torch also freed Morocco and French North Africa. Operation Torch landings in Algeria were focused on Oran, which had two airfields. Oran surrendered on 9 November 1942, one day after the 8 November landings. The American forces led by Lloyd Fredendall, seized Oran from the Vichy troops in two days. Many of the Vichy troops had Allied sympathies. Algeria was needed to fight the Afrika Korps, and Dakar so planes to fly from South American bases to Africa .

Before the Vichy French surrendered they destroy the Oran harbor facilities and disable the Vichy ships at the docks.

Pontoon Causeway unloading from the side of an LST ship at Arzeu Algeria in 1943.

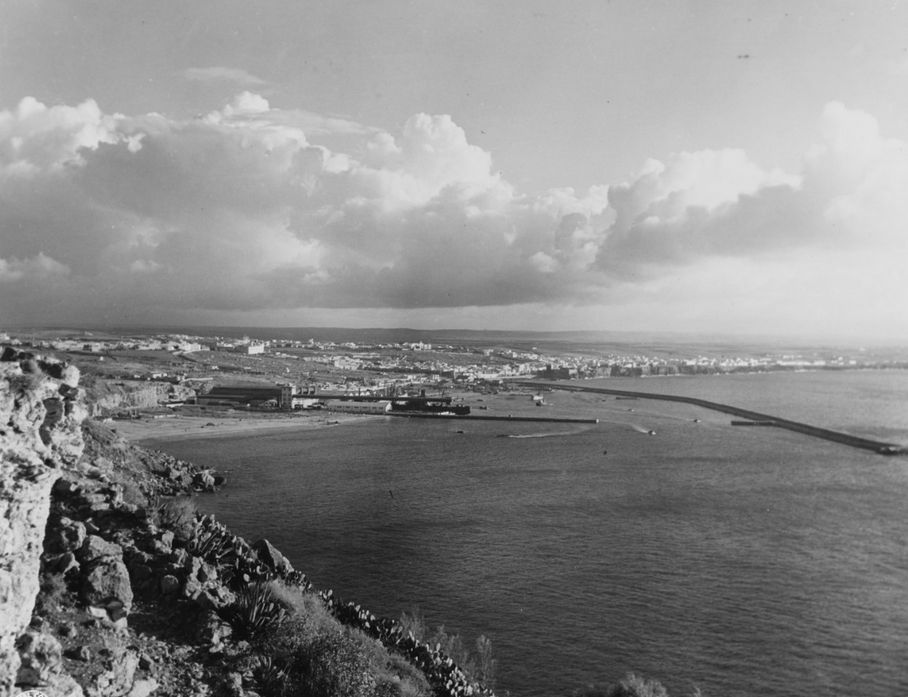
Naval Base Safi, Morocco, photographed from north point in May 1942.

Operation Terminal and Operation Reservist, were part of Operation Torch, the goal was to capture Algeria and French North Africa port facilities before they could be destroyed, both failed at their goal, but the ports were secured and repaired.

After the Vichy French surrendered the Clark-Darlan Negotiations were held in the Hotel St. Georges on 10 November between US General Mark W. Clark and French Admiral François Darlan. In the end, the negotiations gave the outcome they were looking for: ceasefire in Oran and Casablanca, the French African army would help the Allies fight the Nazis, help unload Allied cargo ships, and use of French trains to support the troops. On 24 December 1942, pro-monarchist Fernand Bonnier de La Chapelle assassinated Darlan in his headquarters, but the negotiations agreements continued.

In the end not only did Algerians help with supplies many Muslim and European Algerians joined the Free France army. Algerian troops served with the French Expeditionary Corps under General Alphonse Juin, during the Italian campaign of 1943 and the Allied invasion of southern France in 1944.

After the port city of Dakar surrendered in November 1942, French ships at the port also joined the Allies, including: battleship Richelieu, the heavy cruiser Suffren, light cruisers Gloire, Montcalm, Georges Leygues, and a few destroyers, including cruiser-sized Le Fantasque-class destroyers.

Many of the US Army troops arriving at bases in North Africa had trained at the Desert Training Center at the California–Arizona Maneuver Area. From the US Naval Bases in North Africa, the US Army traveled east against the desert fox, Erwin Rommel's army. The British Eighth Army traveled west against the Erwin Rommel's Afrika Korps. The two armies met up at Tunis and drove the Afrika Korps and Panzer Army Africa out of North Africa.

== Amphibious Training Bases ==
Amphibious Training Bases at and around Oran started in May 1943 under the reverse Lend-Lease with Free France. At the same time, an Amphibious Training Base opened at Ténès and Béni Saf Algeria. After the Tunisian campaign, Oran supported the operation of the Amphibious Training Bases at Bizerte, Tunis, and Ferryville in Tunisia. The towns of Cherchel, Bone, and Mostaganem east of Oran, and Nemours west of Oran became troop staging for upcoming Allied invasions, became the scene of practice invasions. Detachments from the 54th, 70th, and 120th Construction Battalions were responsible for whatever naval establishments were required, but these towns required little in the way of installations. A ship's salvage unit, a naval radio station, and a fuel depot were established in Algiers, which was also the site of the headquarters of Vice Admiral H.K. Hewitt, USN, Commander Naval Forces in Northwest African Waters. The two most common amphibious ships used at the base were Landing Ship, Tank (LST), Landing Craft Infantry (LCI), LCP boats, Landing craft tank and Landing Craft Mechanized boats. The lessons of North Africa helped in improving the future landing and battles of World War II.

US Navy Naval Supply Depot and Camp at Oran, Algeria in 1944

Mobile Hospital Camp at Oran, Algeria in 1944

== Algeria ==
=== Oran Naval Base ===
Oran, Algeria with the city port and Oran's French Naval base Mers El Kebir 5 miles west of Oran, was developed into a major ship-repair base, a large supply depot, a ship's salvage unit operated at the base, naval radio station, fuel depot and a large Naval hospital. The city of Oran had a population of 200,000. Oran became a major operating base for Allies ships in the western Mediterranean Sea. Oran became the staging and supply base for amphibious operations in North African, Sicily, and then in Italy and France. US Navy Seabee Construction Battalions 54th, 70th, and 120th repaired and built new base facilities at Oran and around Algeria. Seabee built a 30-mile road to Arzeu which has a naval port and airport. Seabee took over and improved the city's power, wells and water system. For the depots, the Seabee installed many new quonset huts. Seabee of the 120th Battalion built a 500-bed hospital, US Navy Base Hospital 9, 3 miles south of Oran. At St. Remy, 10 miles southeast of Oran, Seabee of the 120th built an ammunition depot with 29 ammunition magazines. At each location, a Seabee base camp was built, as the Seabee built and maintained each base. The Free French Army consolidated its troops at Oran. The Free French Army built a large base camp and trained its troops at Oran. The Free French Army joined the Allied Army in the invasion of Southern France and on to the Liberation of Paris.

=== Béni Saf Naval Base ===
Béni Saf is 49 miles southwest of Oran and was used as a sub-base to Oran. Seabee with the 54th Battalion worked at Béni Saf. Béni Saf had a large mine that produced manganese ore for the Allies. Béni Safwas deployed into a supply depot and an Advanced Amphibious Training Base. The supply depot was built of 40 100-foot quonset huts.

=== Arzeu Naval Base ===
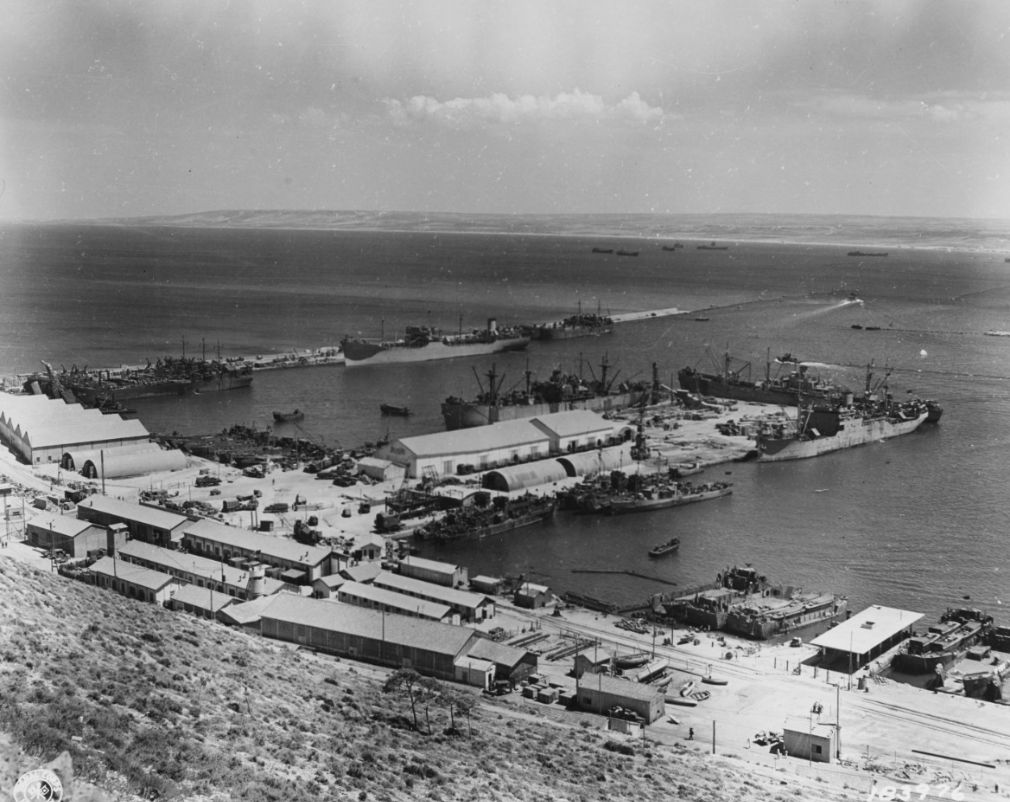
Naval Base Arzeu, Algeria, with allied shipping in the background, Amphibious Training in progress for the landing training.

Arzeu (also spelled Arzew), Algeria was deployed into a Naval advance base, a large Advanced Amphibious Training Base, a hospital, a large supply depot and a staging camp. At Arzeu is the French Fort Supérieur. At Arzeu was a Seabee training base, the Seabee's 1005th and 1006th Detachments trained in building, launching, and installing pontoon causeways that were later used at Sicily, Salerno, and Anzio. With the 500-foot pontoon causeways, LST ships could unload at the shallow beaches of Sicily and Italy. The pontoon causeways were first tried at Narragansett Bay, Rhode Island, but at Arzeu a new deployment technique was to have the pontoon carried on the side of the LST ships to the beaches. This saved time, so the other deployment technique of having the pontoons towed to the invasion beachhead was later ended. CBD 1005 and CBD 1006 Seabee were camped and trained at Arzeu starting May 1943. Later, on November 18, 1943, Seabee 70th Construction Battalion took over the operation at Arzeu. USS LST-389 was based at Arzeu Naval Base and became the flagship for Captain Frank Adams, Commander.

=== Mostaganem Naval Base ===
Mostaganem Base was deployed into a Naval advance base, a large Advanced Amphibious Training Base. Mostaganem is about 30 miles east of Arzeu, then with a population of 50,000. The port was in working order and no work needed to be done. A hospital, troop camp, Seabee camp and supply depot were built. In the town, a French theater was used by the USO and Red Cross for the troops. The town was made up of mostly citizens of French and Spanish descent.

=== Port aux Poules Naval Base ===
Port aux Poules (port of chickens) now called Mers El Hadjadj was a small resort town. Port aux Poules is 15 miles east of Arzeu. With many sandy beaches, the site was good for the Amphibious Training Base. In addition to the standard camp being built, the Seabee built a large fresh water distillation unit. The 85th Infantry Division, 337th Infantry Regiment, 261st Medical Battalion and 92nd Field Artillery Regiment trained at Port aux Poules amphibious Training Base from 1 February to 23 March 1944.

=== Nemours Naval Base ===
Nemours, now called Ghazaouet, Algeria was developed into a Naval advance base, a large Advanced Amphibious Training Base. Nemours is a small fishing town in the western part of Algeria. The Seabee built a large freshwater distillation. A hospital was built in a large French house. A large warehouse was built to be a living space for the troops. A hotel was used for the Headquarters. The port was manmade with breakwater. The 1st Ranger Battalion was activated on May 12, 1943, at Nemours, Morocco, and trained at Nemours.

=== Ténès Naval Base ===
Ténès, Algeria was developed into an Advanced Amphibious Training Base. Ténè was an Arab town with a large French Army base with a manmade port. Ship LCT 33 shot down a Junkers Ju 88 bomber over the port, it crashed 15 miles from the town.

=== Cherchell Naval Base ===
Cherchell, Algeria, is port city and resort town with a lighthouse, that was converted into an Advanced Amphibious Training Base. The town is west of Tipaza. A French military base was near the town and was used for Advanced Amphibious Training Base. The town had many European tourists and thus become known as the Algerian Riviera.

Casablanca Dock Area and Harbor Entrance in 1943. Seabees are repairing the dockside which had been damaged in the shelling of the French ship Jean Bart on 8 November 1943.

=== Bône Naval Base ===
- Bone, Algeria, now called Annaba, was an advanced Base, a PT Boat base and Amphibious Training Base taken in the Battle of Algiers. Bône was built into a major supply depot for the North African campaign. The port also support the nearby Bone Airfield. A 750-bed hospital was set at the base.

== Morocco ==
=== Casablanca Naval Base ===
The US Navy Operated a Naval base at Casablanca, Morocco starting November 1942. Casablanca was headquarters for the Morocco Sea Coast Frontier Forces, a defense command of the United States Navy. Naval Base Casablanca was a full base with a fuel tank farm, mess halls, barracks, theatre, hospital, radio station, supply depot, ammunition depot, and Seabee camp. For the repair of ships a small marine railway was used and repair depot was built for the repair of all types of ships. A depot for the Seabee to assemble pontoon barges and pontoon cranes was built. The Casablanca Conference took place January 14, 1943 to– January 24, 1943 at the Anfa Hotel. The base was closed August 1, 1945 with Seabee and some supplies moved to Port Lyautey.

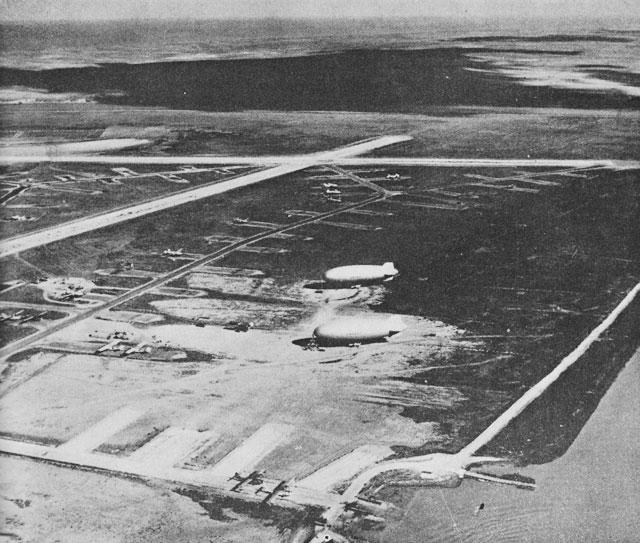
Airfield at Port Lyautey, northwestern, Morocco in 1944 with two runways and blimp station used in U-Boat hunting

=== Naval Air Station Port Lyautey ===
At Port Lyautey in northwestern, Morocco the US Navy operated Naval Air Station Port Lyautey, starting in February 1943. Port Lyautey (now Kenitra) is 86 miles northeast of Casablanca. The Naval Air Station was a French Naval Air Forces base. France built the base starting in 1934, the base had two 6,000 feet paved runways, two hangars, and living space for 500 troops. France had Latécoère 521 seaplanes based at Port Lyautey from 1938 to June 1940. The Sebou River was used for seaplanes and the base had a seaplane ramp and pontoon piers for planes. Seabee made improvements to the base, adding a power plant, naval blimp facility, water supply, 166-bed hospital, supply depot, new housing for 4,000 troops and other facilities. At the end of the war, the base was part of Operation Magic Carpet to return troops home. To expedite the return of soldiers after the war a new operated under Operation Magic Carpet, was done called The Green Project. Green Project had round-the-clock airlift of troops in and out of Naval Air Station Port Lyautey. Due to the activity increase Seabee built new facilities to handle the increase in flights and troops. Seabee built a traffic tower, billeting housing, finance office, personnel office, weather communications center, navigation center, mess halls, Red Cross office, large water supply system and warehouses. Naval Air Station Port Lyautey was one of the last bases in North Africa to close in 1977.

VP73 and Hedron 15 Personnel at Quarters, Agadir Morocco, Awaiting Distinguished Flying Cross Awards in 1944

=== Agadir Naval Base ===
Advance Naval Base Agadir, in Agadir, was used by the US Navy for aircraft of Fleet Air Wing Fifteen starting in April 1943. From the Agadir airfield planes flew anti-submarine patrol from lower French Morocco and the Canary Islands. Some of the units that operated out of Agadir were VP73, VP-92 and Hedron 15. United States Army Air Forces 33rd Fighter Group with Curtiss P-40 Warhawk fighters also operated from Agadir. Seabees and the French Public Works Department built a 5,000 runway at Agadir. The base was built from the local supply of bricks and timber. The Agadir base was transferred to the United States Army in July 1945.

=== Fedala Naval Base ===
The US Navy operated a base at Fedala, (now called Mohammedia) was similar to Casablanca, though smaller. The Fedala Base has a lighthouse towerat the port. The Fedala harbor has an 800-foot breakwater. The town, in 1943, had a population of 16,000. Fedala was invaded to facilitate the capture of Casablanca, as ground troops at Fedala move on Casablanca. U-boats sank three US troopsships at Fedala, including the USS Electra and USS Joseph Hewes. An U-Boat damaged the USS Hambleton and USS Winooski at Fedala. Members of the German Armistice Commission were captured at Fedala as they tried to flee. The Fedala port was captured in Operation Brushwood.

=== Safi Naval Base ===
The US Navy operated a base at Safi, Morocco, similar to Casablanca, though smaller. The town, in 1943, had a population of 25,000. The artificial harbor which used to export phosphates was built up to a small Naval Base with small emergency landing field. The harbor had a 100-foot lighthouse tower. Safi was used to unload troops and gear that advanced on Casablanca in Operation Torch. The USS Lakehurst unload tanks at Safi used in the operation. The port was captured in Operation Blackstone.

== Tunisia ==
Tunis Naval Base Dry Dock at Tunis' port La Goulette, Tunisia used to repair small ships and boats. Used by US Navy from May 1943 to 1945.

=== Tunis Naval Base ===
Tunis Naval Base also La Goulette Naval Base. called Axis forces retreated towards Sicily after being surrounded by Allied forces from Algeria to the west and from Libya to the east in May 1943. The base in Tunis was repaired and used as an Amphibious Training Base. The base was used for the invasion of the island of Pantelleria, and then Sicily, and then the mainland of Italy. The port of Tunis is in the town of La Goulette, next to the large shadow Lake de Tunis. The French had a channel built from the port to the city of Tunis. The Naval took over and repaired the Naval Base and small dry dock at Tunis. Axis forces had land naval mines and sank ships to block the port, all the Seabees cleared. An Italian school was taken over for the Navy's use. The port was captured in the Tunisia Campaign. Carthage an old city in ruins is three miles from Tunis. The Free French Army consolidated its troops at Tunis. The Free French Army built a large base camp and trained its troops at Tunis. The Free French Army joined the Allied Army in Operation Dragoon, the invasion of Southern France, and on to the Liberation of Paris.

=== Bizerte Naval Base ===
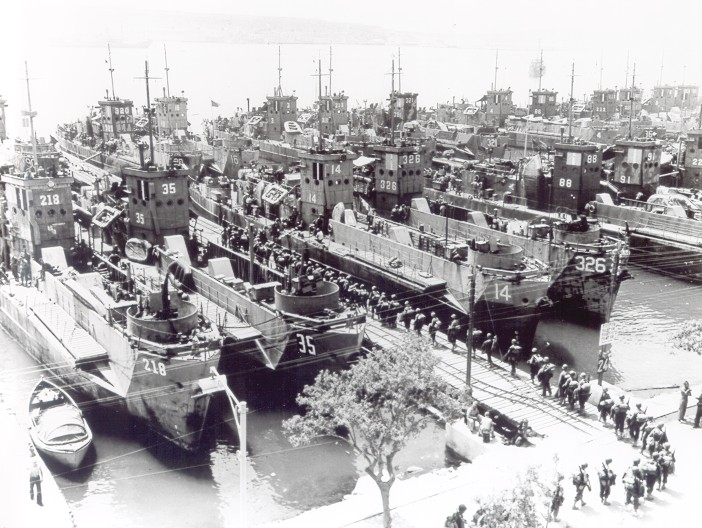
Troops boarding LCIs (Landing Craft Infantry ships) at Naval Base Bizerte, Tunisia, for the invasion of Sicily - Operation Husky July 1943.

At Bizerte, Tunisia (north of Tunis) the US Navy operated at a naval base, PT Boat base, tank farm, hospital, supply depot, and Advanced Amphibious Training Base. The base was built after the German and Italian armies were defeated on May 7, 1943, in the Tunisian campaign. Seabee had to clear the harbor of mines and debris. Seabee with the 1006, 54, and 1040 construction battalions were stationed at Bizerte. At Bizerte was a French military base with a submarine base, Seabee has repair work at both bases and add tent and hut camps. The French had made the port by digging a 5-mile channel to an inland lake. The channel continued inland to the town of Ferryville. Along the channel at La Pêcherie was the submarine base and ammo depot. At the base a rifle range, outdoor theater and ice cream shop. The camp was given the nickname the Navy's Country Club, due to the good food and facilities. A ship repair depot was built for the LSTs and LCIs. The Navy and Army also used the local railroad line to move supplies. Near the lake was Naval Air Base Karouba. Seabee On March 9, 1944, the US cargo ship SS Clark Mills hit a mine off Bizerte, the ship was able to beach at Bizerte with no casualties, but the ship was a loss. On December 3, 1944, the US Ship USS LST-141 was damaged when she ran aground at Bizerte, she was repaired at return to service. Bizerte was used as a base for the invasion of Sicily and invasion of Italy. Seabee CBD 1005 moved from Arzeu to Bizerte in June 1943. In May 1945, the Bizerte base, port, depot, and Amphibious Training Base were closed and all supplies were removed and the fuel depot with a 10,000-barrel tank was given to France. The port supported the Bizerte Airfield.

=== Ferryville Naval Base ===
At Ferryville, now Menzel Bourguiba, Tunisia, a port 40 miles northwest of Tunis. The town had a population of about 10,000. A Medical Supply Depot was built at the Naval Base to support the Sicily invasion.

== French West Africa ==
=== Dakar Naval Air and Sea Base ===
Dakar Naval Air Base and sea port were in Dakar, French West Africa, now Senegal, on the Atlantic Ocean. The Dakar Air Base is now Léopold Sédar Senghor International Airport. American troops landed at Dakar on December 26, 1942. Dakar Airport was within range of planes from Natal, Brazil, thus became an important link across the Atlantic. The route was used by the United States Army Air Forces Air Transport Command. The port at Dakar had a large supply depot that was used to support action Mediterranean Area. From Dakar planes flew to Dakhla Airport, near Villa Cisneros in the Spanish Sahara, also to Atar Airport. Flights from Pretoria, South Africa also used Dakar refueling at Robertsfield, Liberia, the Belgian Congo and Northern Rhodesia.

== Bases ==
=== Naval Bases ===
- Algiers, Algeria, Africa FPO# 922 (Fleet Post Office #922) and FPO# 728, Box 25, General HQ
- Oran, Algeria, Africa FPO# 147, City Port
- Mers El Kebir, Algeria, Africa FPO# 233, Oran Naval Base See Attack on Mers-el-Kébir
- Arzeu, Algeria, Africa FPO# 232, Naval Station and Naval Air Facility
- Nemours, Ghazaouet, Algeria, Africa, FPO# 235, Advanced Amphibious Training Base
- Beni Saf, Algeria, Africa FPO# 236, Advanced Amphibious Training Base
- Mostaganem, Algeria, Africa FPO# 238, Advanced Amphibious Training Base
- Ténès, Algeria, Africa FPO# 239, Advanced Amphibious Training Base
- Cherchel, Algeria, Africa FPO# 240, city port
- Tipaza, Algeria, Africa FPO# 241, city port and HQ.
- Dakar, French West Africa FPO# 241 see Battle of Dakar
- Nouasseur Base, became Nouasseur Air Base

=== Airfields ===
- Tafaraoui Airfield Oran
- Oran Tafraoui Airport
- Nouvion Airfield
- La Sénia airfield Oran
- Lambiridi Airfield Batna, Algeria
- Blida Airfield Blida, Algeria
- Mostaganem Airport
- Angads Airport
- Naval Air Station Port Lyautey
- Berguent Airfield
- Bone Airfield
- Casablanca–Anfa Airport
- Guercif Airfield
- Louis Gentil Field
- Médiouna Airfield
- Ras el Ma Airfield
- Naval Air Base Karouha (former French at Bizerte Naval Base)
- Bizerte Airfield
- Oudna Airfield
- Tunis–Carthage Airfield
- Kairouan Airfield
- Bizerte-Sidi Ahmed Air Base
- La Senia Airfield Oran

== Post war ==
After Victory in Europe Day the bases in Algeria were not needed. The naval slowly returned the ports and bases over to France. The depots were turned over on June 26, 1945, and Naval Base on July 29, 1945. The US Naval ammo magazine depot was closed on September 7, 1945. On September 30, 1945, the Naval Hospital 9, the medical storehouse and remain supply depots were closed. On December 1, 1945, the reverse Lend-Lease of the base and land ended.

- Algeria became Independent on July 5, 1962. Morocco became independent on April 7, 1956. Tunisia became independent on March 20, 1956.
- Naval Air Station Port Lyautey was the last Naval Base in North Africa to close in 1977, as it became a training base after the war. The other North Africa were closed in 1945.
- Memorial Meeting 22 October 1942, is a Memorial at Messelmoun, Algeria.

Operation Flagpole: In preparation for Operation Torch, British General Clark landed in Algeria for talks with French General Mast and Robert Murphy, an American diplomat. Murphy had been negotiating with the French leaders about the invasion. French Generals Mast and Bethouart, Chiefs of Staff at Algiers and Casablanca have given their support. But the French Navy is still upset with the British for the bombings of French ships at Mers-el-Kebir and Dakar. General Mast gives cooperation with the allied effort and helps French General Giraud as the French leader to accept.

== British Empire bases ==
Also see:Italian Libya in World War II, North African campaign and Western Desert campaign
In the early days of the war US ships supplied British Empire North Africa bases with M3 Lee tanks, known as M3 Grant tanks and later M4 Sherman tanks, also Jeeps, under the lend-lease act.

- Port of Alexandria was a base of warships and supply ships in Egypt. In the 1941 raid on Alexandria Italian Navy divers attacked two Royal Navy battleships with manned torpedoes.
- Port Said Egypt was the training site of the New Zealand Expeditionary Force starting in 1940.
- British Empire used ports on the Suez Canal, like Adabiya, El Arish and Said.
- The port at Safaga in the Red Sea was used as they were out of reach of Axis planes.
- Tobruk in Libya was a port and base held by mostly the Australian soldiers, known as the Rats of Tobruk. Tobruk had a deep, natural, and protected harbor, thus a key port to support armies in North Africa. Italian Libya was held by the Italians. Tobruk was captured by British, Australian and British Indian forces on 22 January 1941. In the Battle of Gazala Tobruk was lost to Afrika Korps in June 1942. British retook Tobruk on November 11, 1942, in the Second Battle of El Alamein.
- Tripoli, Libya and its port fell to the British Eighth Army on January 23, 1943, in the Battle of Tripoli.
- Benghazi, Libya lost and was captured several times in the war. Italians took the city and port in Operation Compass the city was captured on February 6, 1941. General Rommel took the port on April 4, 1941. British took the port on December 24, 1941, in Operation Crusader. Rommel took it again on January 29, 1942. In Second Battle of El Alamein, Egypt–British troops led by General Bernard Montgomery took Benghaziagain on November 20.
- Derna, Libya was taken Australian Troops on 30 January 30, 1941. Rommel took the city on April 6, 1941, and the British took the city on November 15, 1942.
- El Alamein, Egypt was a major port and base for the support of the Egypt–British troops led by General Bernard Montgomery. The port supported the westward push in the First Battle of El Alamein in July 1942, Battle of Alam el Halfa in September 1942 and the Second Battle of El Alamein in November 1942.
- Port Tewfik, Egypt at the Suez Canal was a key support port for the Egypt–British troops.
- Sallum, Egypt British supply port and site of a battle January 10, 1942, supporting the battle at nearby Halfaya Pass.
- Mersa Matruh, Egypt was a supply port and an important rail station terminus. Mersa Matruh was also the site of the Baggush Box camp and the Battle of Mersa Matruh.
- Bougie Harbour, Algeria was taken by the British November 11, 1942.
- British Mandatory Palestine has ports that supplies the British Empire. A fuel depot was used at Haifa.
- Island of Malta, port, Grand Harbour submarine base, airfield, and seaport. Supplied by Operation Vigorous.

== Photo gallery ==
1006th Seabees in the Salerno Invasion,Operation Avalanche, unloading an LST ship over a Pontoon Causeway at Safta Beach in September 1943. The ship had trained and loaded with the Pontoon Causeway at an US Naval Bases North Africa Amphibious Training Bases

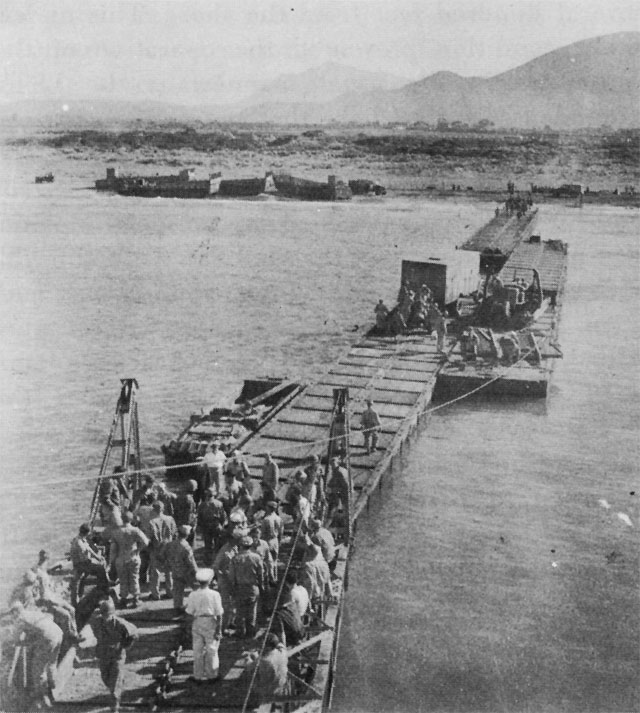
1006th Seabees using a Three-Section Pontoon Causeway at Safta Beach in September 1943.

Cherchell Navy Base in Algeria, US Navy base in Algeria from May 1943 to 1945

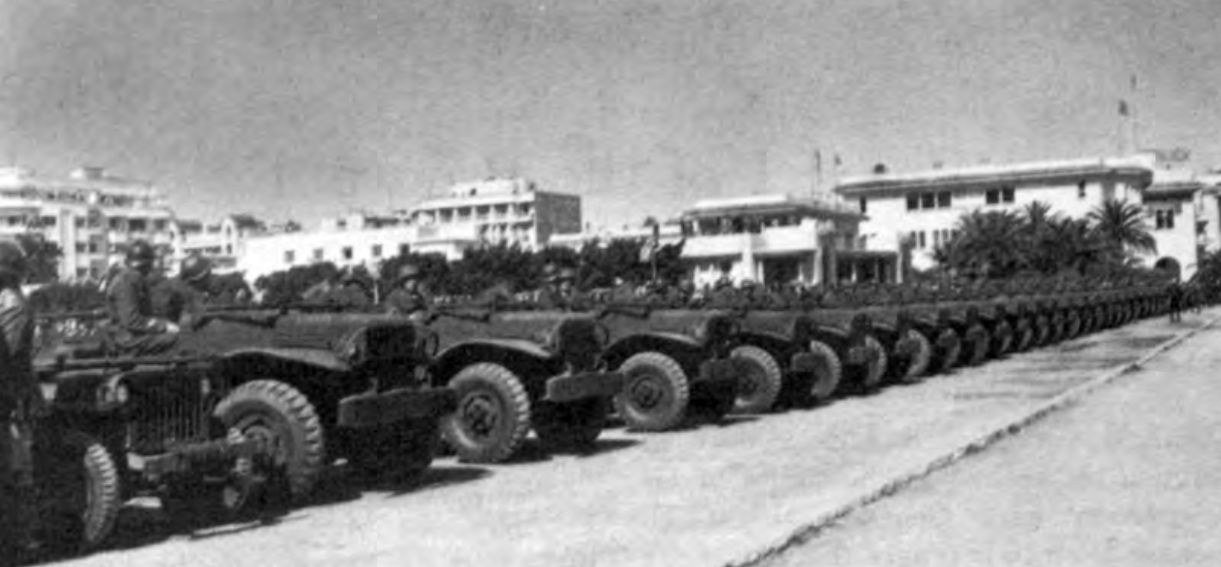
Casablanca Naval Base, vehicles unloaded at port in 1943 ready for the US Army's drive east to fight Nazi Afrika Korps.

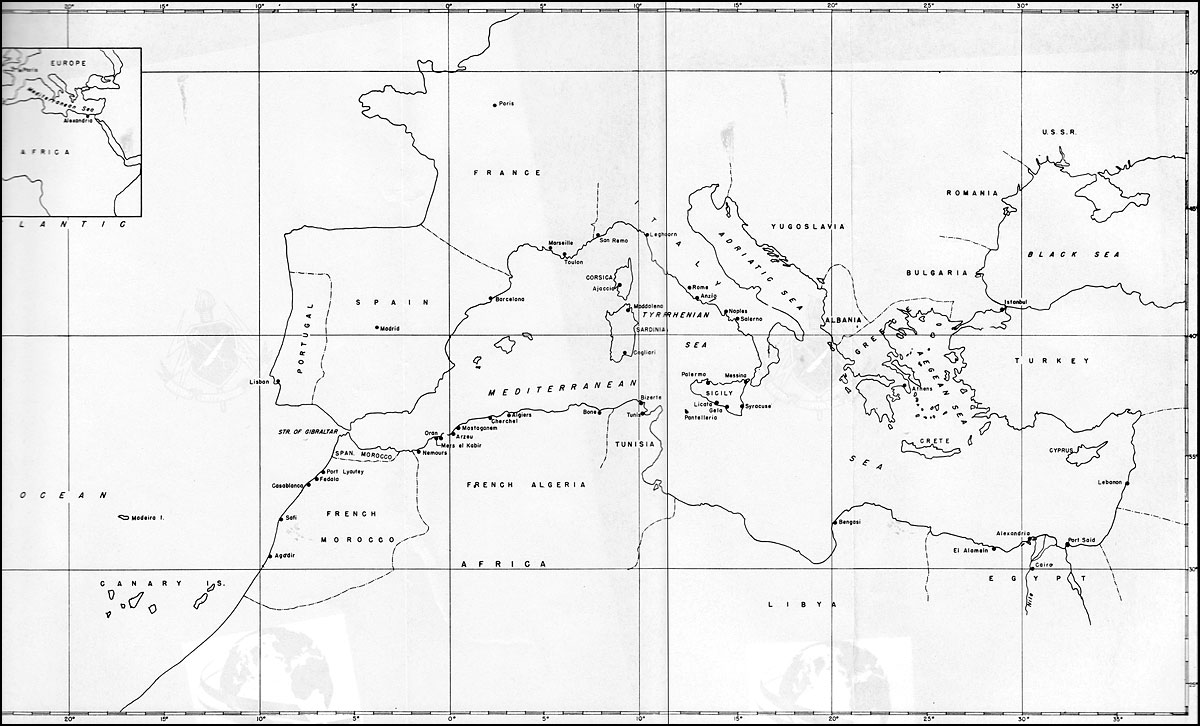
Mediterranean Area US Navy map from 1944.

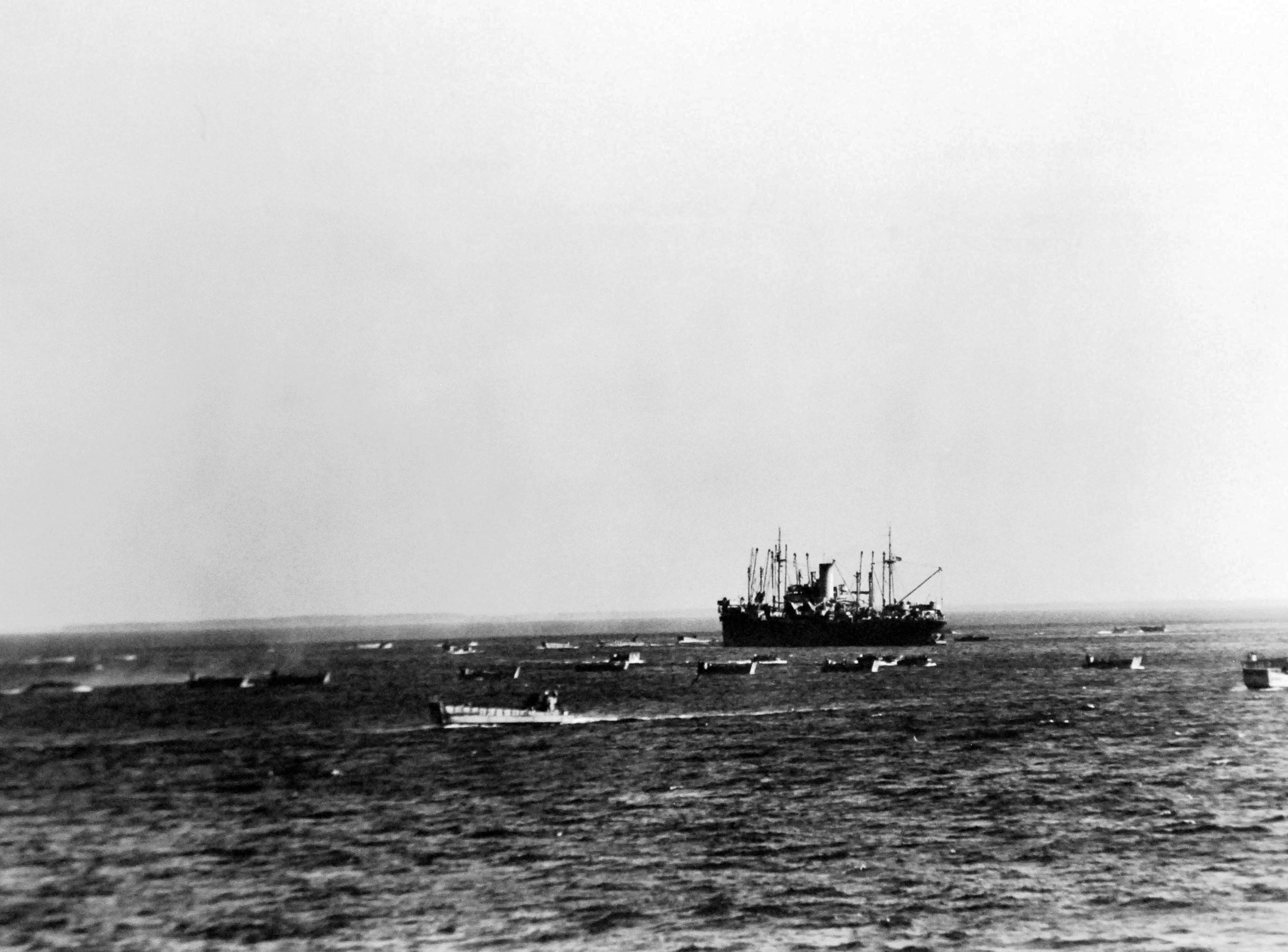
American ships preparing to land off Safi, Morocco, during Operation Blackstone

Ténès Port in 1943, Ténès, Algeria was developed into an Advanced Amphibious Training Base by the US Navy from May 1942 to 1945.

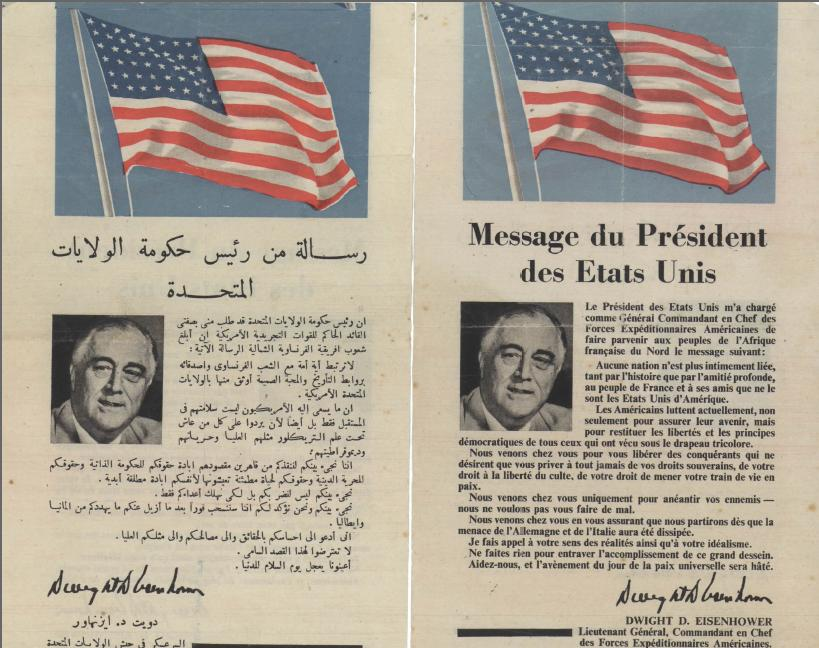
A flyer in French and Arabic that was distributed by Allied forces in the streets of Casablanca, calling on citizens to cooperate with the Allied forces.

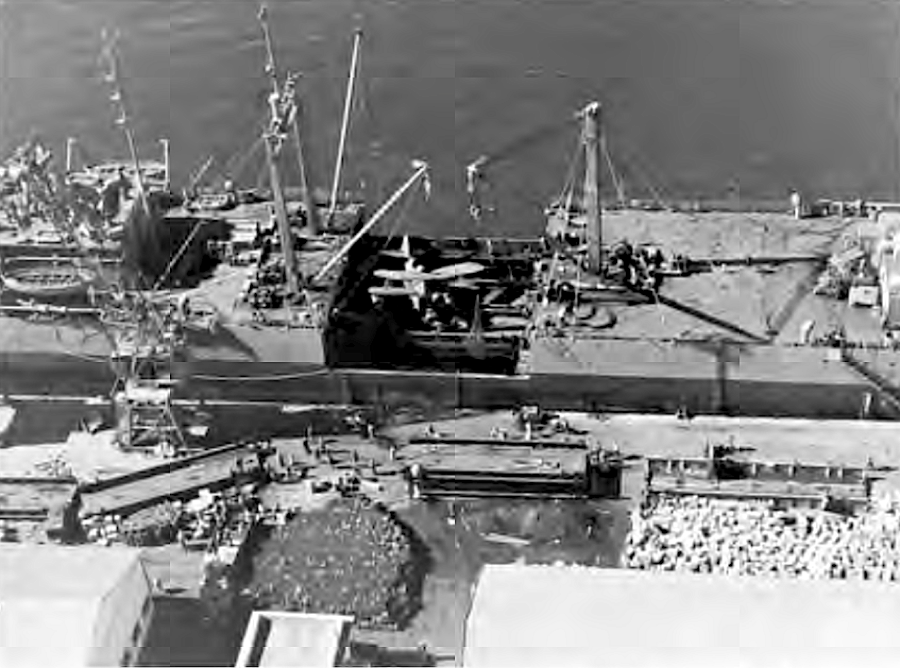
USS Lakehurst (formerly Seatrain New Jersey), after discharging medium tanks at Safi, Morocco. Load is damage plane to be repaired.

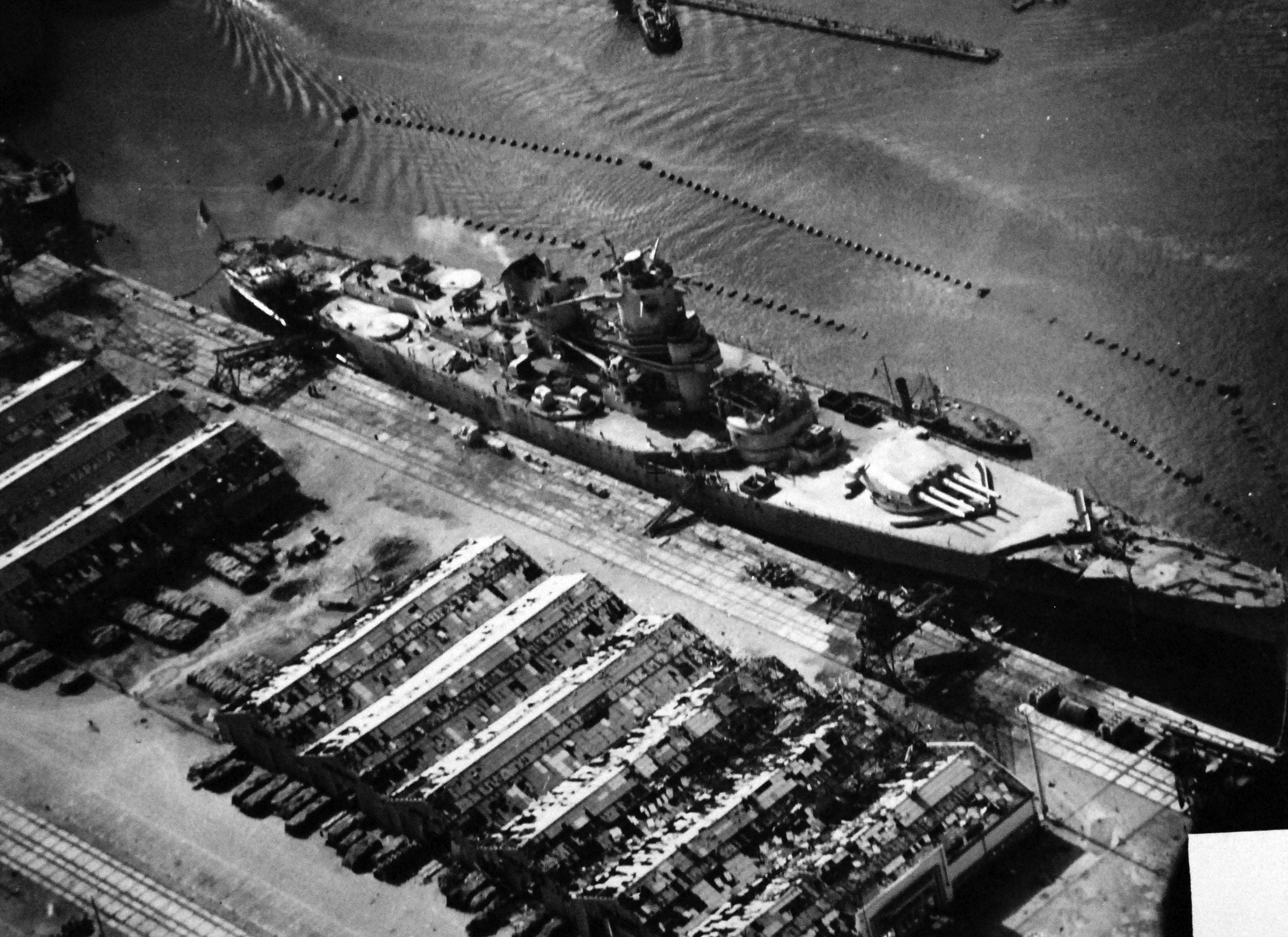
Jean Bart attacked by planes of USS Ranger at Casablanca port.

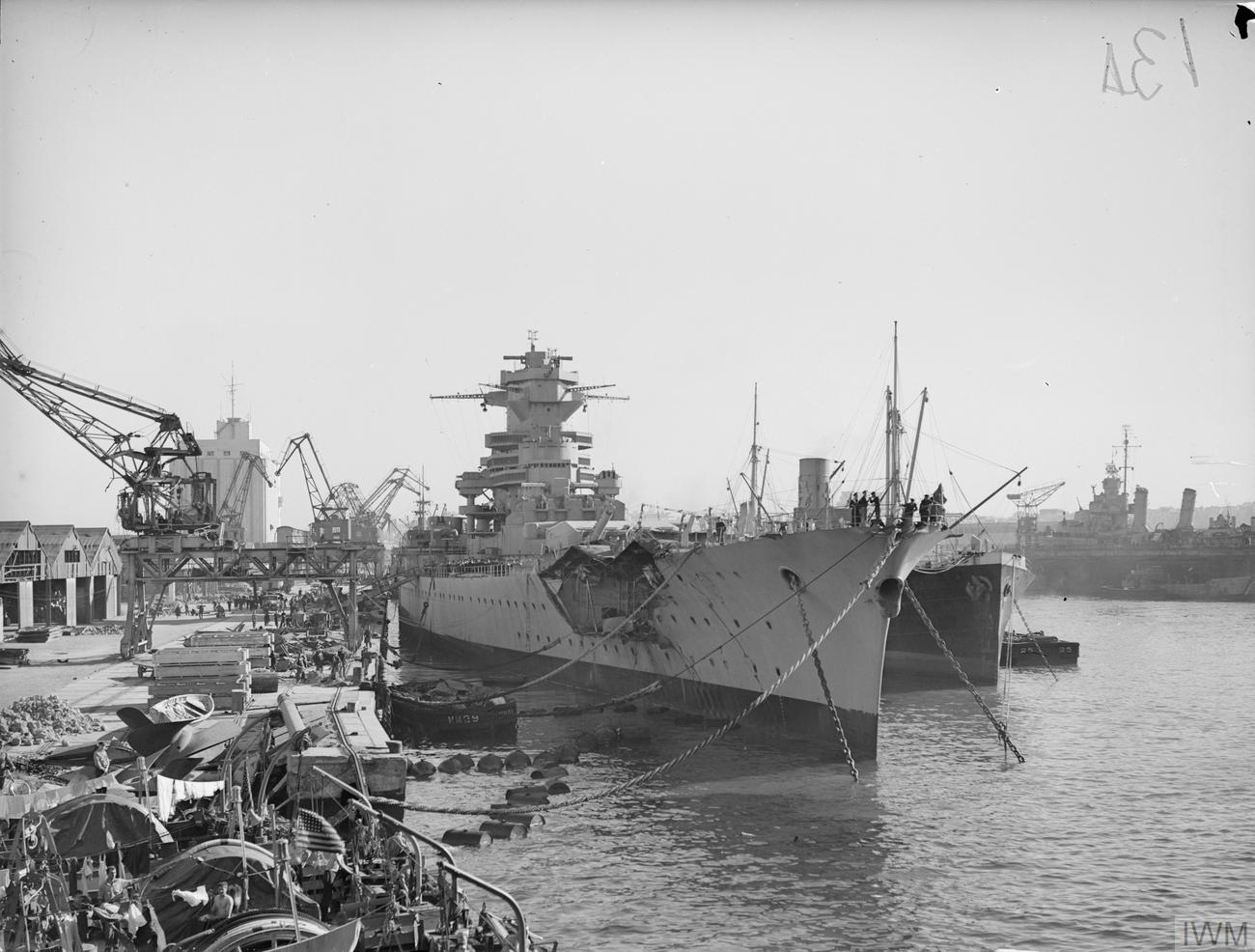
Jean Bart being repair at Casablanca port

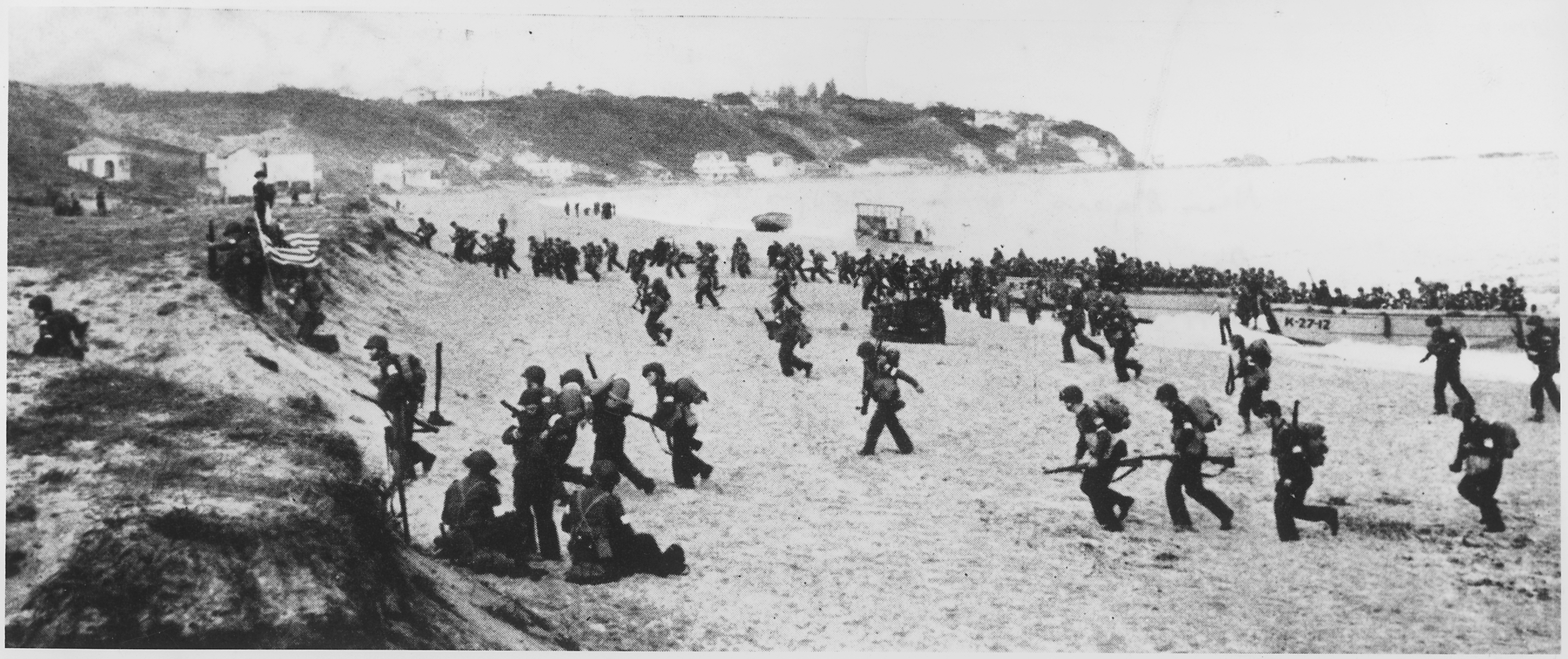
American troops land on an Algerian beach during Operation Torch

Map of Tunisia in 1942 and 1943

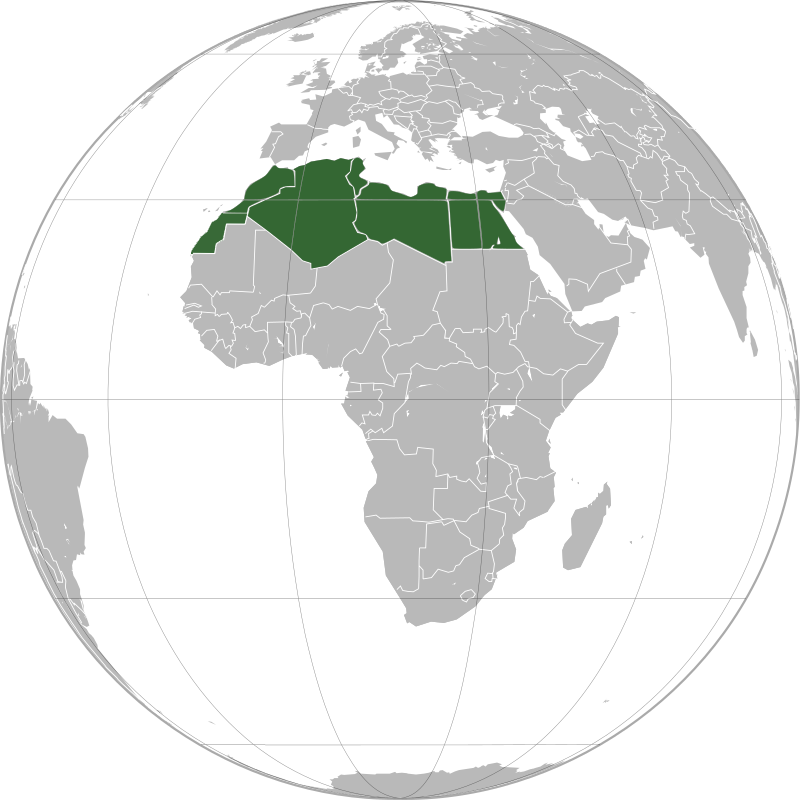
Map North Africa

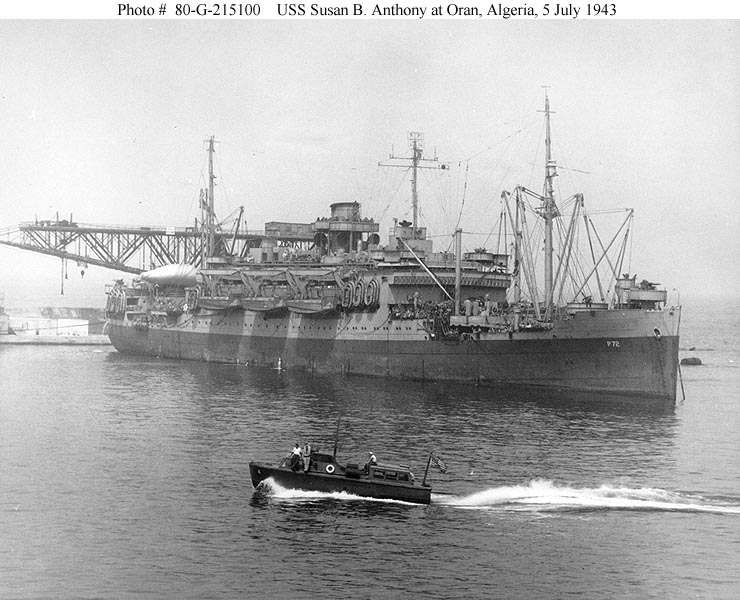
SS Susan B. Anthony at Oran July 5, 1943, just before departing for the invasion of Sicily

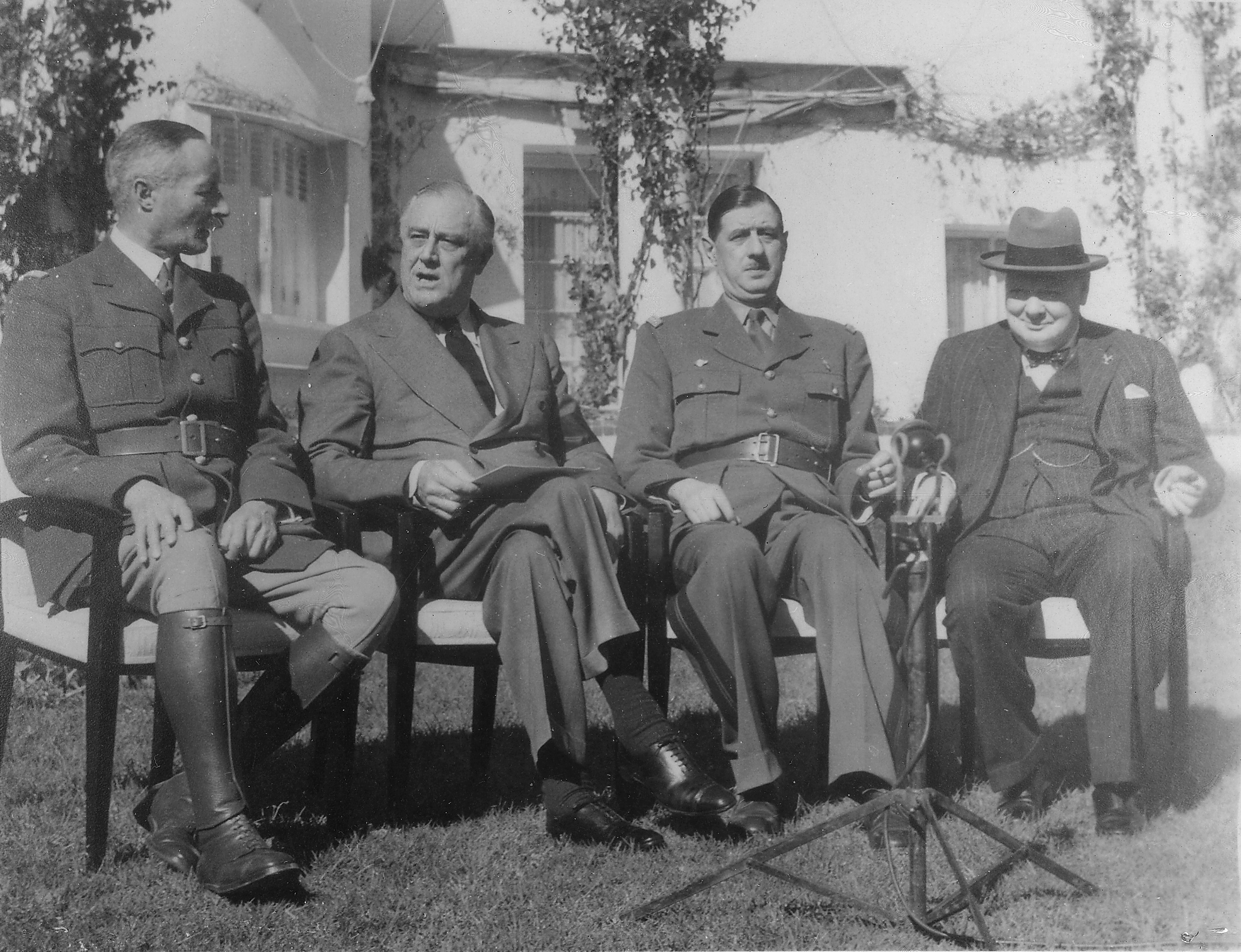
Casablanca Conference, Casablanca, Morocco, 1943

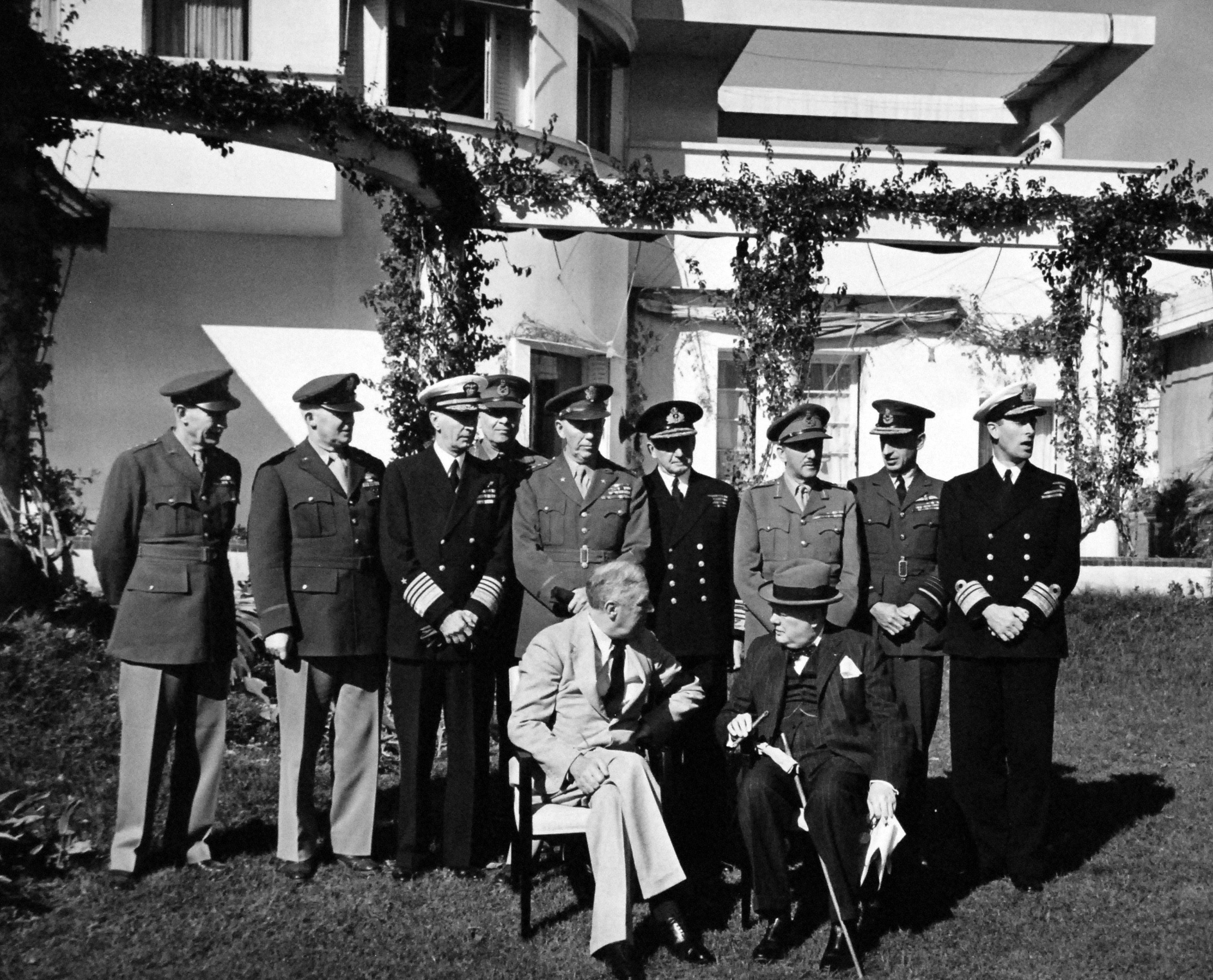
United States President Franklin D. Roosevelt, British prime minister Winston Churchill, and their advisors in Casablanca, 1943

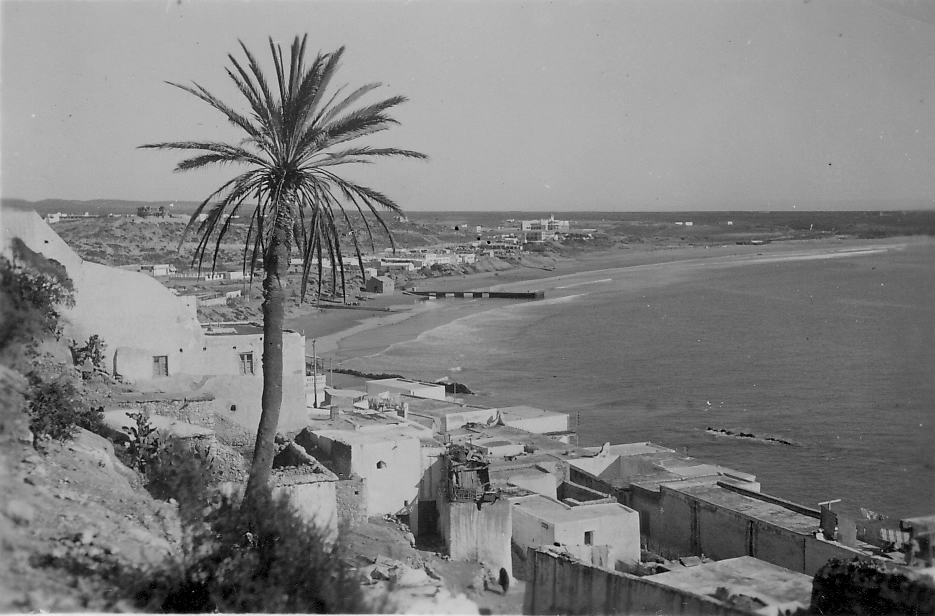
Agadir port in Morocco

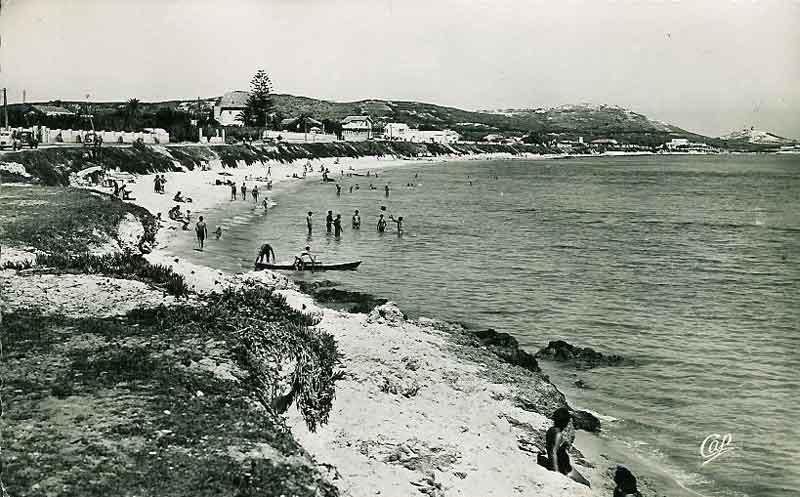
Port of Bizerte Morocco, before Naval base

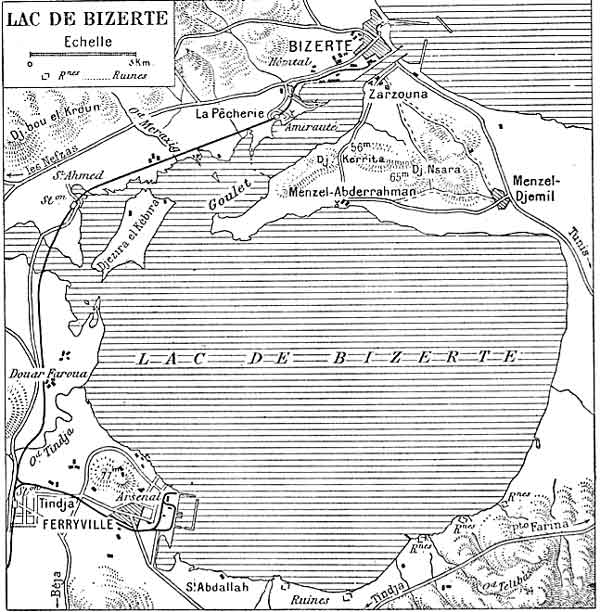
Map of Port of Bizerte Morocco

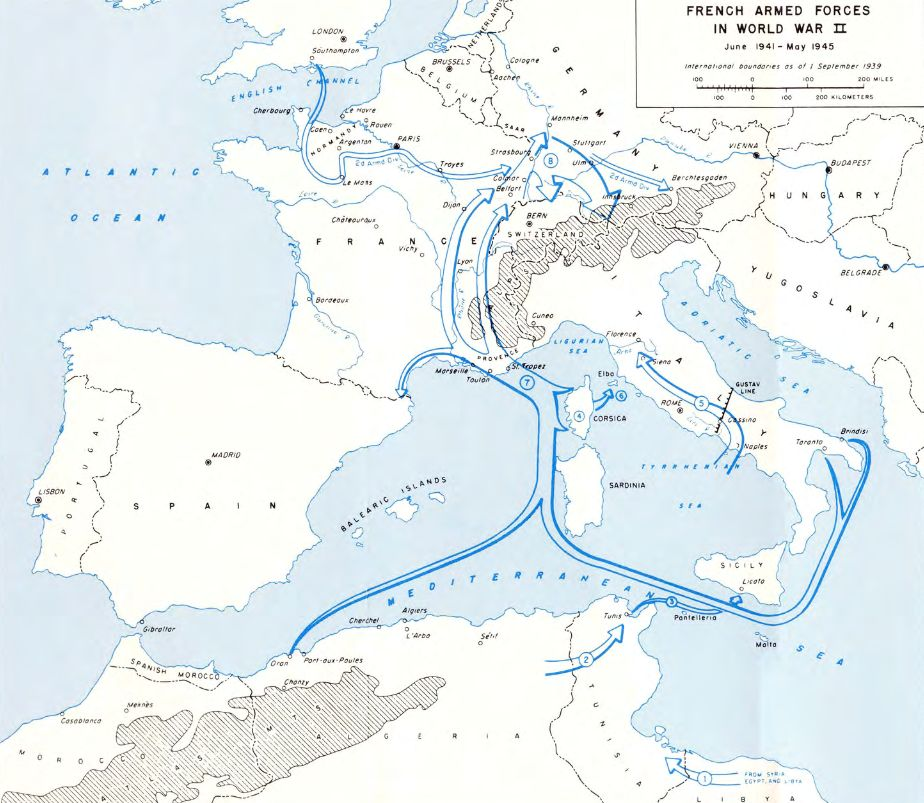
Free French Army movement map from June 1941 to 1945 from the US Army

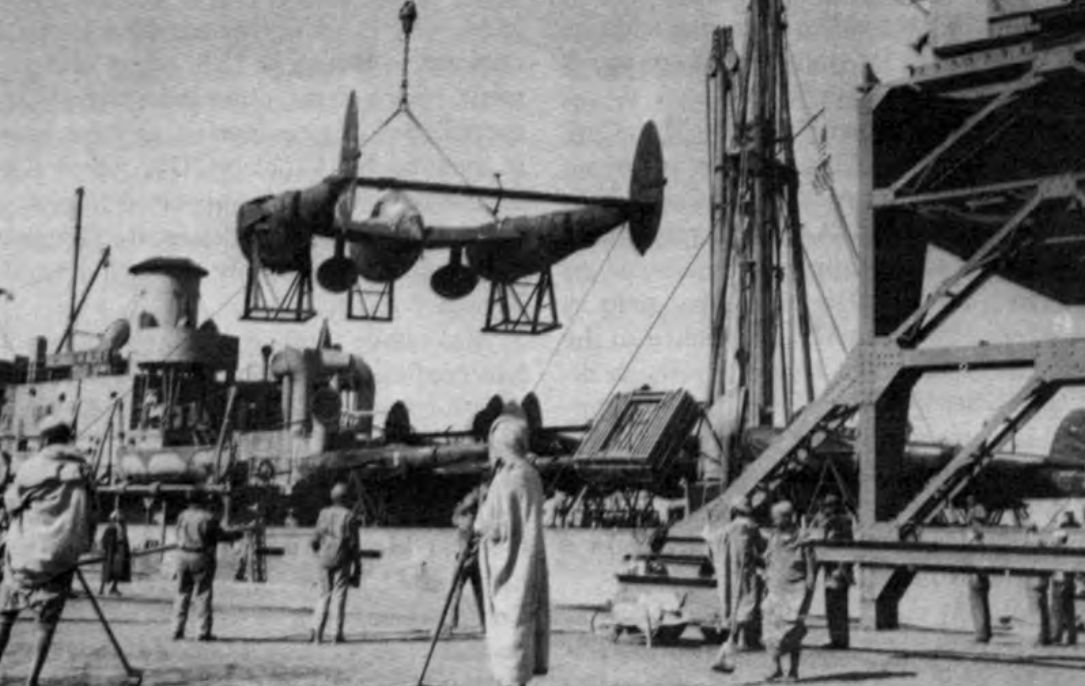
Unloading P-38` Fighter Planes For The Free French Army at Casablanca, on April 13, 1943.

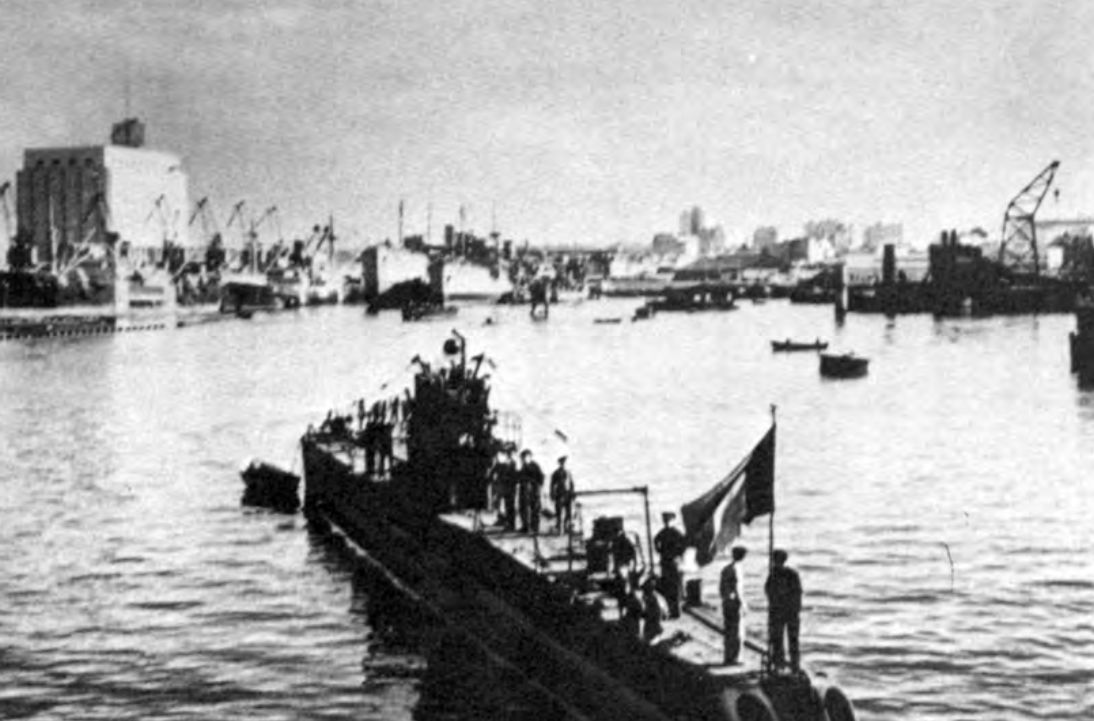
French Submarine, Casablanca Harbor, Joins Allied Forces In North Africa, November 12, 1942

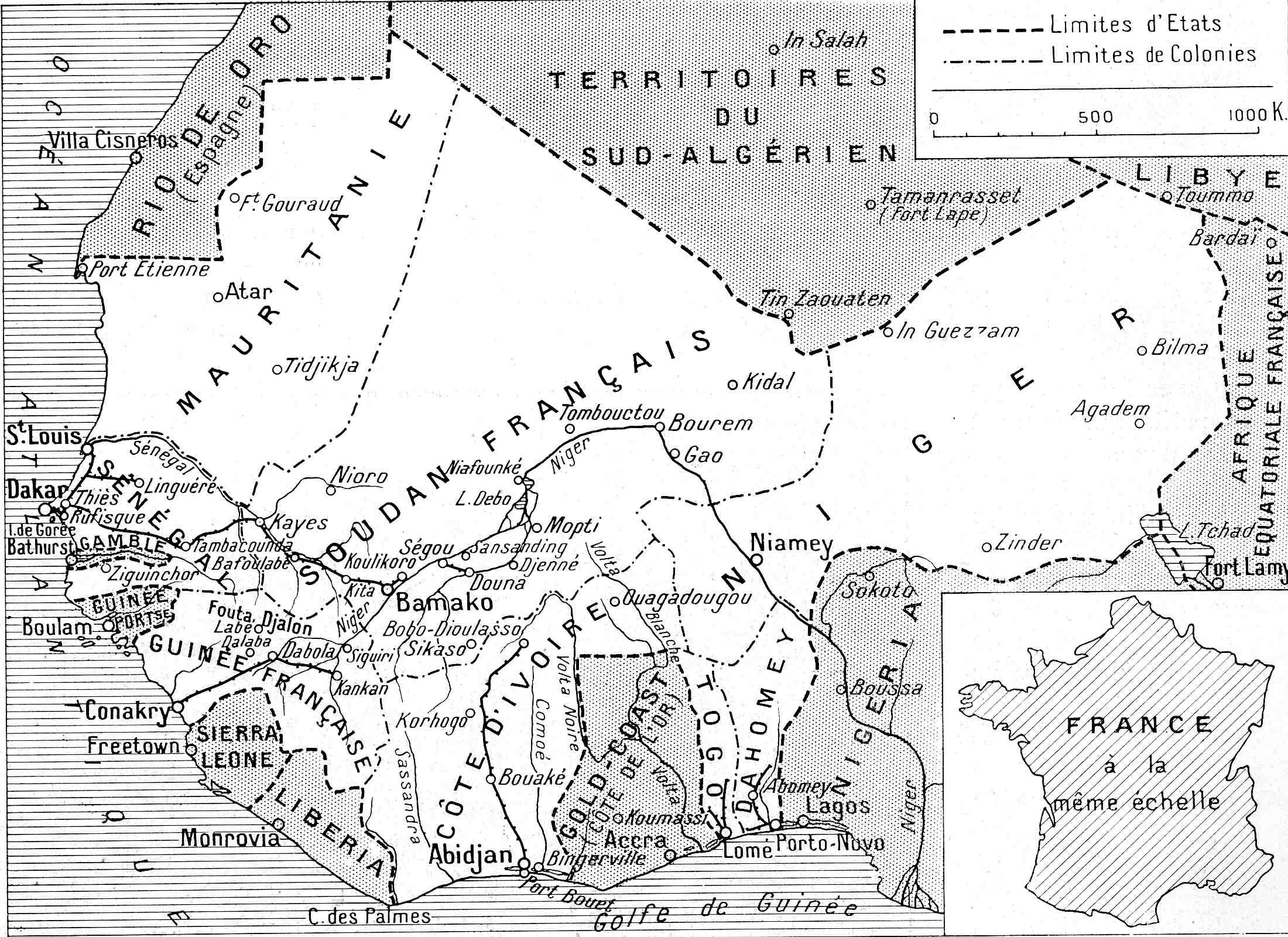
Map of Site of French West Africa and Dakar Naval Base

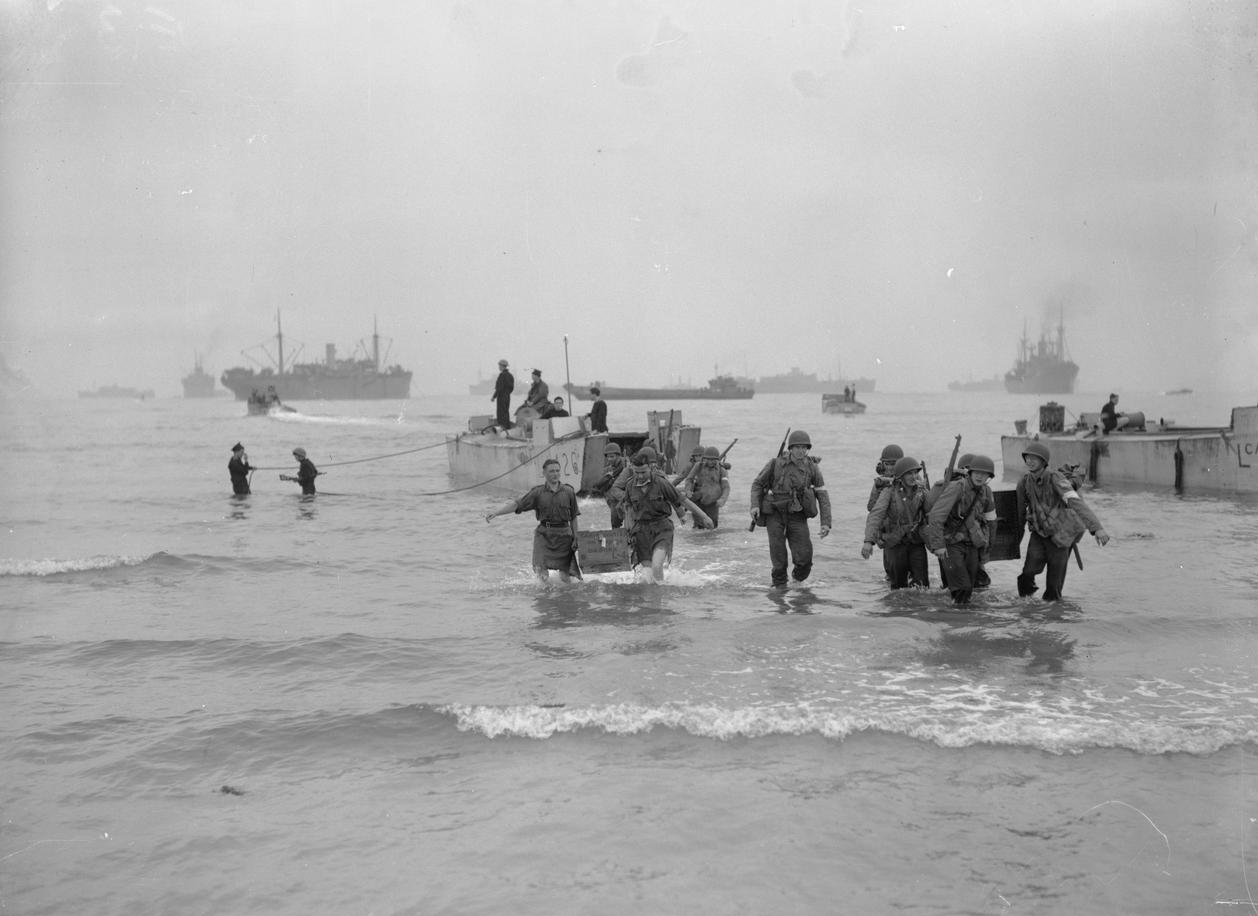
American troops unload stores from LCA 26 at Beach Z, near Arzeu

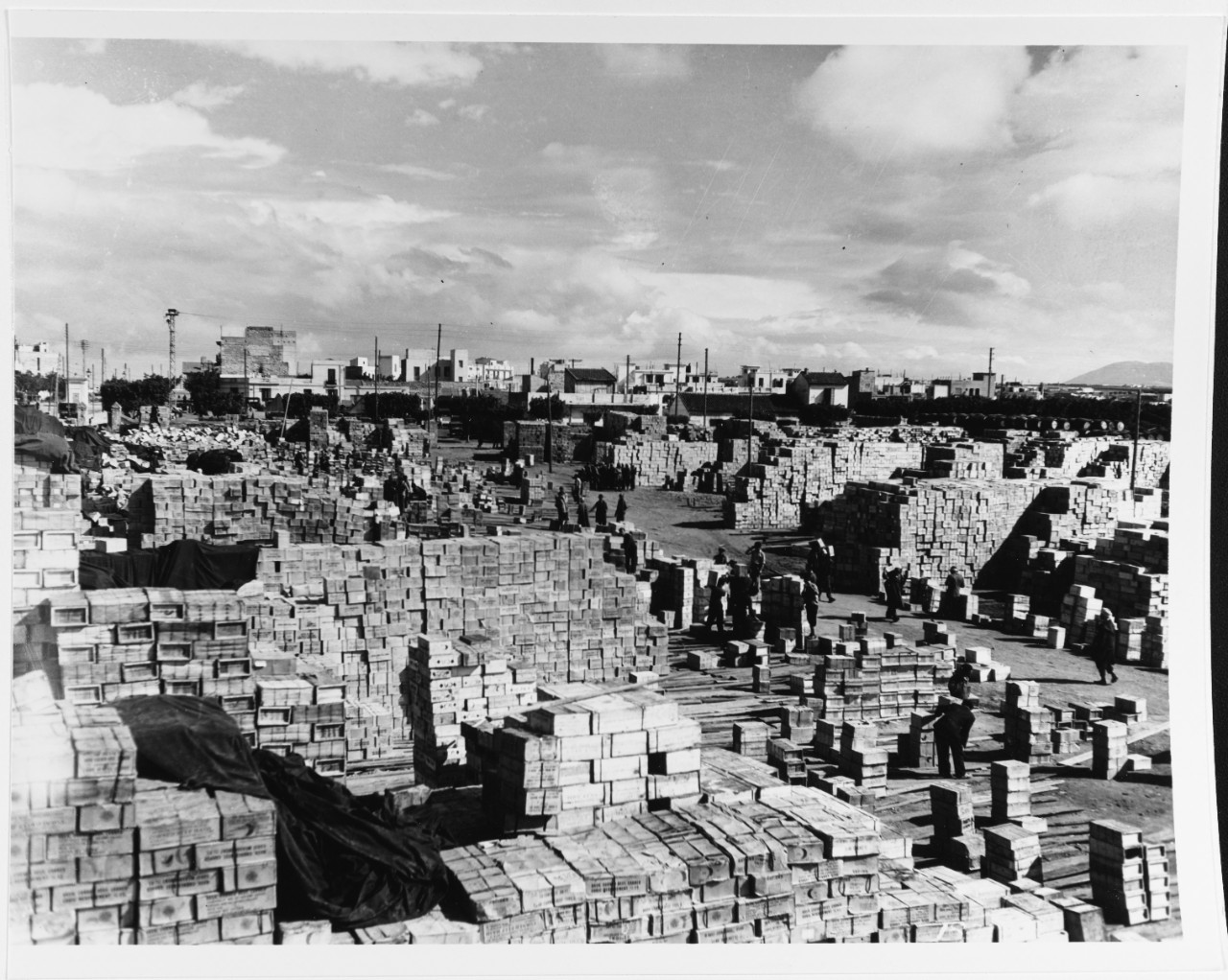
Oran, Algeria. Supplies stacked at the 160-Q-"F" Army Quartermaster Corps Depot, 17 March 1943.

Western Desert Battle Area 1941

== See also ==
- Battle of the Mediterranean
- US Naval Advance Bases
- North African campaign timeline
- Operation Flagpole (World War II)
- Operation Husky
- Allied Invasion of North Africa in 1942
- 6th Port Headquarters
- Operation Tidal Wave
