= 121st Brigade =

121st Brigade may refer to:

== China ==
- 121st Brigade, Republic of China; see January 28 incident order of battle

== India ==
- 121 (Independent) Infantry Brigade, part of 8th Infantry Division (India)

== Soviet Union ==
- 121st Guards Artillery Brigade
- 121st High-Power Howitzer Artillery Brigade, part of 5th Shock Army
- 121st Separate Tank Brigade, part of 65th Army (Soviet Union)

== Ukraine ==
- 121st Territorial Defense Brigade

== United Kingdom ==
- 121st Brigade (United Kingdom)
- 121st Brigade, Royal Field Artillery

== See also ==
- 121st Division (disambiguation)
- 121st Regiment (disambiguation)
- 121st Battalion (disambiguation)
