= 121st Signal Battalion =

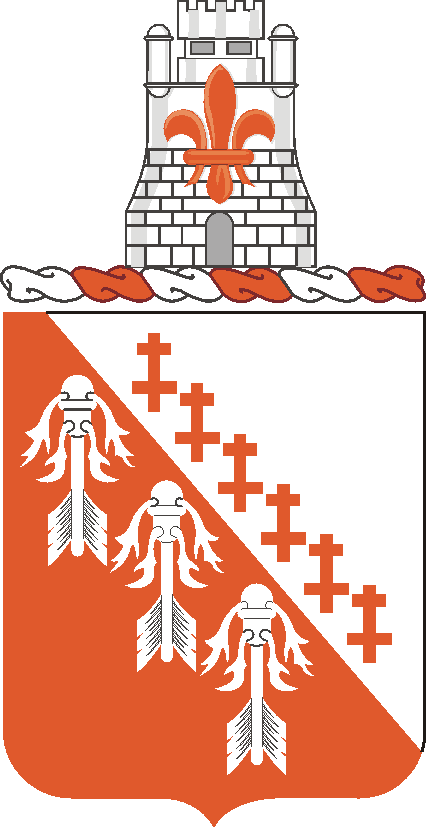
- 121st Signal Battalion coat of arms
- Active: 1916-07-01 – 1995-12-15; 1996-02-06 – 2006-04-10
- Country: United States
- Allegiance: Regular Army
- Branch: U.S. Army
- Role: Communications
- Size: Battalion
- Part of: 1st Infantry Division
- Motto: TO PARON EY POIEIN (Do well the duty that lies before you)
- Corps Colors: Orange and White
- Engagements: Spanish–American War; World War I World War II; Vietnam; Southwest Asia

Insignia
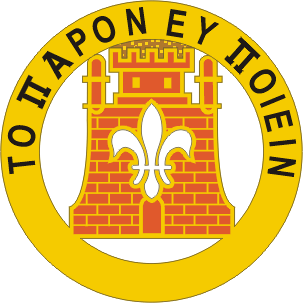
- Distinctive Unit Insignia

The 121st Signal Battalion was a signal unit of the United States Army, inactivated as of July 2006. Prior to deactivation, it provided signal support to the 1st Infantry Division.

== Lineage ==
- Constituted 1916-07-01 in the Regular Army as a Signal Corps battalion.
- Organized 1916-09-16 at Fort Sam Houston, Texas, as the 2nd Field Battalion, Signal Corps, to consist of the following pre-existing companies:
1. Company A organized 1898-07-27 as Company A, Signal Corps;
  Redesignated 1910-04-05 as Field Company A, Signal Corps;
  Re-designated 1915-10-19 as Radio Company A, Signal Corps;
  Re-designated 1916-11-11 as Company A, 2nd Field Battalion, Signal Corps.
2. Company B organized 1898-07-27 as Company D, Signal Corps;
  Re-designated 1910-04-05 as Field Company D, Signal Corps;
  Re-designated 1916-11-11 as Company B, 2nd Field Battalion, Signal Corps
- Company C, 2nd Field Battalion, Signal Corps, organized 1917-05-11.
- Battalion assigned 1917-05-24 to the 1st Expeditionary Division.
- Reorganized and re-designated 1917-08-03 as the 2nd Field Signal Battalion
- Reorganized and re-designated 1921-02-09 as the 1st Signal Company.
- Reorganized and re-designated 1957-02-15 as Headquarters and Headquarters Company, 121st Signal Battalion (organic elements constituted 1957-02-08 and activated 1957-02-15 at Fort Riley, Kansas)
- Inactivated 1995-12-15 at Fort Riley, Kansas
- Company B inactivated 2005-11-09 at Larson Barracks in Kitzingen.
- Company A inactivated 2006-03-31 at Conn Barracks in Schweinfurt.
- Company C and HHC inactivated 2006-04-10 at Larson Barracks.

== Honors ==
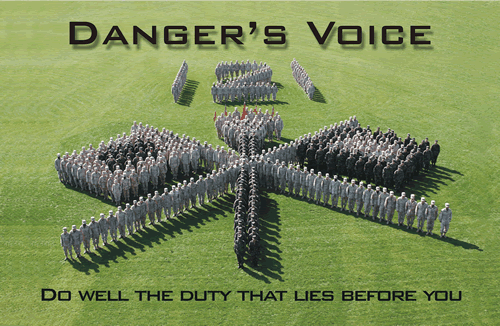

=== Campaign participation credit ===
- War with Spain:
1. Puerto Rico.
- World War I:
1. Montdidier-Noyon;
2. Aisne-Marne;
3. St. Mihiel;
4. Meuse-Argonne;
5. Lorraine 1918;
6. Picardy 1918
- World War II:
1. Algeria-French Morocco (with arrowhead);
2. Tunisia;
3. Sicily (with arrowhead);
4. Normandy (with arrowhead);
5. Northern France;
6. Rhineland;
7. Ardennes-Alsace;
8. Central Europe
- Vietnam:
1. Defense;
2. Counteroffensive;
3. Counteroffensive, Phase II;
4. Counteroffensive, Phase III;
5. Tet Counteroffensive;
6. Counteroffensive, Phase IV;
7. Counteroffensive, Phase V;
8. Counteroffensive, Phase VI;
9. Tet 69/Counteroffensive;
10. Summer-Fall 1969;
11. Winter-Spring 1970
- Southwest Asia:
1. Defense of Saudi Arabia;
2. Liberation and Defense of Kuwait;
3. Cease-Fire

=== Decorations ===
- Presidential Unit Citation (Army) for EUROPE 1944–1945
- Meritorious Unit Commendation (Army) for
1. EUROPEAN THEATER
2. VIETNAM 1966–1967
3. VIETNAM 1967–1968
4. VIETNAM 1968–1969
- Army Superior Unit Award for
1. 1996–1997
2. 1997

French Croix de guerre with Palm, World War I for:

1. LORRAINE-PICARDY
2. AISNE-MARNE and MEUSE-ARGONNE
- French Croix de Guerre with Palm, World War II for:
1. TUNISIA
2. NORMANDY
- French Croix de Guerre with Gilt Star, World War I for:
1. FRANCE
- Fourragère in the colors of the French Médaille militaire
- Belgian fourragère 1940
1. Cited in the Order of the Day of the Belgian Army for action at Mons.
2. Cited in the Order of the Day of the Belgian Army for action at Eupen-Malmedy
- Republic of Vietnam Cross of Gallantry with Palm for VIETNAM 1965–1968
- Republic of Vietnam Civil Action Honor Medal, First Class for VIETNAM 1965–1970

== Heraldic items ==
=== Coat of arms ===
==== Blazon ====
- Shield: Per bend enhanced Argent and Tenné on the first palewise in bend six Lorraine Crosses and on the second palewise in bend three fire arrows all counterchanged.
- Crest: On a wreath of the colors Argent and Tenné, a Spanish castle Argent charged with a fleur-de-lis Tenné.
- Motto: TO PARON EY POIEIN (Do Well The Duty That Lies Before You).

==== Symbolism ====
- Shield:
1. The colors orange and white are for the Signal Corps.
2. The six Lorraine crosses represent six World War I Battle Honors and are arranged to suggest a telegraph line.
3. The three fire arrows symbolize three assault landings in World War II and also suggest the Signal functions which such weapons once served.
- Crest:
1. The Spanish castle taken from the Spanish Campaign Medal symbolizes the organization's service in Puerto Rico during the Spanish–American War and the fleur-de-lis its service in World War I.
2. The colors white (silver) and orange are the colors of the Signal Corps.
- Background: The coat of arms was approved on 1958-01-08.

=== Distinctive unit insignia ===
- Description: A white fleur-de-lis superimposed on an orange Spanish castle by a gold band with the motto "TO PARON EY POIEIN."
- Symbolism:
1. The Spanish castle taken from the Spanish Campaign Medal symbolizes the organization's service in Puerto Rico during the Spanish–American War and the fleur-de-lis its service in World War I.
2. The colors white and orange are the colors of the Signal Corps.
3. The motto is translated "Do Well The Duty That Lies Before You."
- Background:
1. The distinctive unit insignia was originally approved for the 1st Signal Company on 1930-03-18.
2. It was amended to correct the spelling of the motto on 1930-10-15 and again on 1934-10-10.
3. The insignia was redesignated for the 121st Signal Battalion on 1958-01-08.

== History ==
The 121st Signal Battalion was formed in 1898 as part of the United States Army Signal Corps, serving in Puerto Rico during the Spanish–American War. In 1921, the two companies were reorganized as the 1st Signal Company, which was later honored with its own distinctive crest.

=== World Wars I and II ===
The unit received six battle honors in World War I, symbolized by the six Lorraine crosses appearing on their coat of arms. During World War II, the unit supported the 1st Infantry Division as they conducted combat operations in Normandy, France, Belgium and Czechoslovakia. During this war, the unit was awarded the Presidential Unit Citation, Meritorious Unit Commendation and the French fourragère.

=== Post-war ===
In 1957, the 1st Signal Company officially re-designated to the 121st Signal Battalion. In 1962 part of the 121st was deployed to Florida during the Cuban Missile Crisis of 1962. B Company was stationed at McCoy AFB (now part of Orlando International Airport) and SGT Norman Hansen and SP4 William Hawkins Jr established communications for the infantry. Hawkins was later promoted to SGT. This was before the public was aware of a problem. The government did not recognize that they were deployed to Florida. Since then, the battalion has served with the 1st Infantry Division in Vietnam, Saudi Arabia, Bosnia and Herzegovina and Kosovo.

The battalion was deployed to Iraq with the 1st Infantry Division in 2004, returning to Germany in early 2005. Company C, the last company of the unit, was inactivated 10 April 2006, at Larson Barracks, Kitzingen, Germany.

=== Inactivation ===
Prior to its inactivation the unit was stationed in Kitzingen, Germany, and supported the 1st Infantry Division with MSE communications. The battalion was last deployed in operation OIF II at Tikrit, Iraq “FOB DANGER” in 2004. The unit consisted of HHC “Dangers Voice”, A (Archangels, Wired-Up!), B (Blackhawks), C (Charlie Rock), and D company. D company was stationed at Fort Riley as a rear detachment of sorts for the battalion along with the rear detachment for the 1st Infantry division. The battalion was inactivated as part of the decrease in over-seas forces that the US military is currently undergoing, the return of the 1st Infantry Division stateside and the fielding of many signal units in the signal regiment with JNN communications equipment. Alpha company was moved to Schweinfurt, Germany prior to inactivation to be stationed with the 2nd BCT, 1ID (Dagger) and was reflagged as the 57th Signal Company.

The last commander prior to inactivation was Lieutenant Colonel Dana Tankins. The last CSM was CSM Mitchell.

== See also ==
- 57th Signal Company
- U.S. 1st Infantry Division

== Bibliography ==
- American Battle Monuments Commission. 1st Division, Summary of Operations in the World War. Washington, D.C.: Government Printing Office, 1944.
- Bergen, John D. Military Communications: A Test for Technology. United States Army in Vietnam. Washington, D.C.: United States Army Center of Military History, United States Army, 1986.CMH Pub 91-12.
- Blumenson, Martin:

Breakout and Pursuit. United States Army in World War II. Washington, D.C.: Office of the Chief of Military History, Department of the Army, 1961. 1st Infantry Division cited. CMH Pub 7-5.
Salerno to Cassino. United States Army in World War II. Washington, D.C.: Office of the Chief of Military History, United States Army, 1969. 1st Infantry Division cited. CMH Pub 6-3.

- Bowman, Patrick A. "C3 That Is Really C3." Army Communicator 7 (Spring 1982): 4–11
- Cole, Hugh M. The Ardennes: Battle of the Bulge . United States Army in World War II. Washington, D.C.: Office of the Chief of Military History, Department of the Army, 1965. 1st Infantry Division cited.
- Garland, Albert N., and Howard McGaw Smyth. Sicily and the Surrender of Italy. United States Army in World War II. Washington, D.C.: Office of the Chief of Military History, Department of the Army, 1965. 1st Infantry Division cited. CMH Pub 6-2.
- Goda, Bryan, and Douglas Babb. Providing Communications to Task Force Eagle in Bosnia: Doing More with Less. Army Communicator 22 (Fall 1997): 7–12.
- Greenstreet, Medford, ed. 1st Infantry Division, Fort Riley, Kansas, 1956. N.p.: Miller Publishing Company, 1956.
- Harrison, Gordon A. Cross-Channel Attack. United States Army in World War II. Washington, D.C.: Office of the Chief of Military History, United States Army, 1951. 1st Infantry Division cited. CMH Pub 7-4.
- Horn, Tyree R. The First Signal Company in Georgia. Signal Corps Bulletin 108 (April–June 1940): 31–44.
- Howe, George E Northwest Africa: Seizing the Initiative in the West. United States Army in World War II. Washington, D.C.: Office of the Chief of Military History, Department of the Army, 1957. 1st Infantry Division cited. CMH Pub 6-1
- Johnson, Danny M. Military Communications Supporting Peacekeeping Operations in the Balkans: The Signal Corps at Its Best. Mannheim, Germany: Headquarters, 5th Signal Command, 2000.
- Knickerbocker, H. R., et al. Danger Forward: The Story of the First Division in World War II. Atlanta: Albert Love Enterprises, 1947. Reprint, Nashville: Battery Press, 1980.
- MacDonald, Charles B.The Siegfried Line Campaign. United States Army in World War II. Washington, D.C.: Office of the Chief of Military History, Department of the Army, 1963. 1st Infantry Division cited. CMH Pub 7-7-1.
- Myer, Charles R. Division-Level Communications, 1962–1973. Vietnam Studies. Washington, D.C.: Department of the Army, 1982.
- Noble, Thoms E, ed. 1st Infantry Division, 35th Anniversary. Darmstadt, Germany: L. C. Wittich, 1952.
- Raines, Rebecca Robbins:

Getting the Message Through: A Branch History of the U.S. Army Signal Corps . Army Historical Series. Washington, D.C.: Center of Military History, United States Army, 1996. CMH Pub 30-17-1.
A Record of the Activities of the Second Field Signal Battalion, First Division. Cologne: J. P. Bachem, 1919.

- Rienzi, Thomas M. Communications-Electronics, 1962–1970. Vietnam Studies. Washington, D.C.: Department of the Army, 1972.
- Society of the First Division:

History of the First Division During the World War, 1917–1919. Philadelphia: John C. Winston Company, 1922.
Tasks Performed by the 121st Signal Battalion During the Period 1 June 1966 Through 31 May 1967. N.p., 1967.

- Terrett, Dulany. The Signal Corps: The Emergency. United States Army in World War II. Washington, D.C.: Office of the Chief of Military History, Department of the Army, 1956.
- Thompson, George Raynor, and Dixie R. Harris:

The Signal Corps: The Outcome (Mid-1943 through 1945). United States Army in World War II. Washington, D.C.: Office of the Chief of Military History, United States Army, 1966.
Vietnam, April 1967 – April 1968: A Pictorial History of the 121st Signal Battalion, 1st Infantry Division. N.p., 1968.
Vietnam, October 1965 – April 1967: A Pictorial History of the 121st Signal Battalion, 1st Infantry Division. N.p., 1967.

- Wilson, Jimmie, ed:

1st Infantry Division in Vietnam, 1969. Tokyo: Dai Nippon Printing Company, c. 1969.
1st Infantry Division in Vietnam, July 1965 – April 1967. Tokyo: Dai Nippon Printing Company, 1967.
1st Infantry Division in Vietnam, 1 May 1967 – 31 December 1968. Tokyo: Dai Nippon Printing Company, c. 1969.
