= Larson Barracks =

Military garrison in Bavaria, Germany

- Larson Barracks (Germany)

Site information
- Type: Military Garrison
- Condition: Closed

Location
- Coordinates: 49°43′46″N 010°08′35″E

Site history
- Built: 1936-1938
- In use: 1936–2007

Garrison information
- Occupants: Wehrmacht (1936-1945); U.S. Army (1945-2007)

Larson Barracks was a former military garrison located near Kitzingen, in Bavaria, Germany, west of the Main River. It was active as a military base, first for Nazi Germany from 1936-1945 and then for the United States from 1945-2006 before being returned to the German government in 2007.

== History ==
The kaserne (English: barracks) was constructed between 1936 and 1938, on the southwestern edge of the town of Kitzingen. It served as home to the I. Abteilung des Flak-Regiments 19 (English: 1st Squadron, 19th Anti-Aircraft Artillery Regiment) as well as the FlaK-Ersatz Abteilung (English: Anti-Aircraft Artillery Replacement Detachment) and other units. Toward the end of the war, the facility was used as a Prisoner of War (POW) camp, housing some 300 French POWs when the camp was liberated in April, 1945. After World War II, the facility was occupied by the US Army. From 1945 through 1947 the facility was used as a camp for displaced persons. Between 1947 and 1952 it was used as a collection point for Germany Army trucks to refurbished and sold.

== Naming after Captain Stanley Larson ==
FlaK Kaserne was renamed Larson Barracks on 19 May, 1962 (HQ USAREUR General Order #11, April, 1962), in honor of CPT Stanley E. Larson of the U.S. Army Corps of Engineers who served with the 10th Engineer Battalion, 3rd Infantry Division, and was killed in action on 23 May 1944, near Anzio in Italy.

Stanley Emil Larson was born 9 January, 1920, in Idaho, to Alex A. and Irene Larson. By 1930, the Larson family had moved to Los Angeles and later settled in Merced. Larson participated in Operation Torch in North Africa, leading 3rd Platoon, Company C, 10th Engineer Battalion reinforcing Company L, 3rd Battalion Landing Team during the assault on Port Blondin and the bridges at Wadi Nefifikh during Operation Brushwood. During the assault on Italy in late September, 1943, CPT Larson, then commander of Company C, 10th Engineer Battalion, led his men in the rapid re-construction of a demolished bridge along the main road south of Acerno.

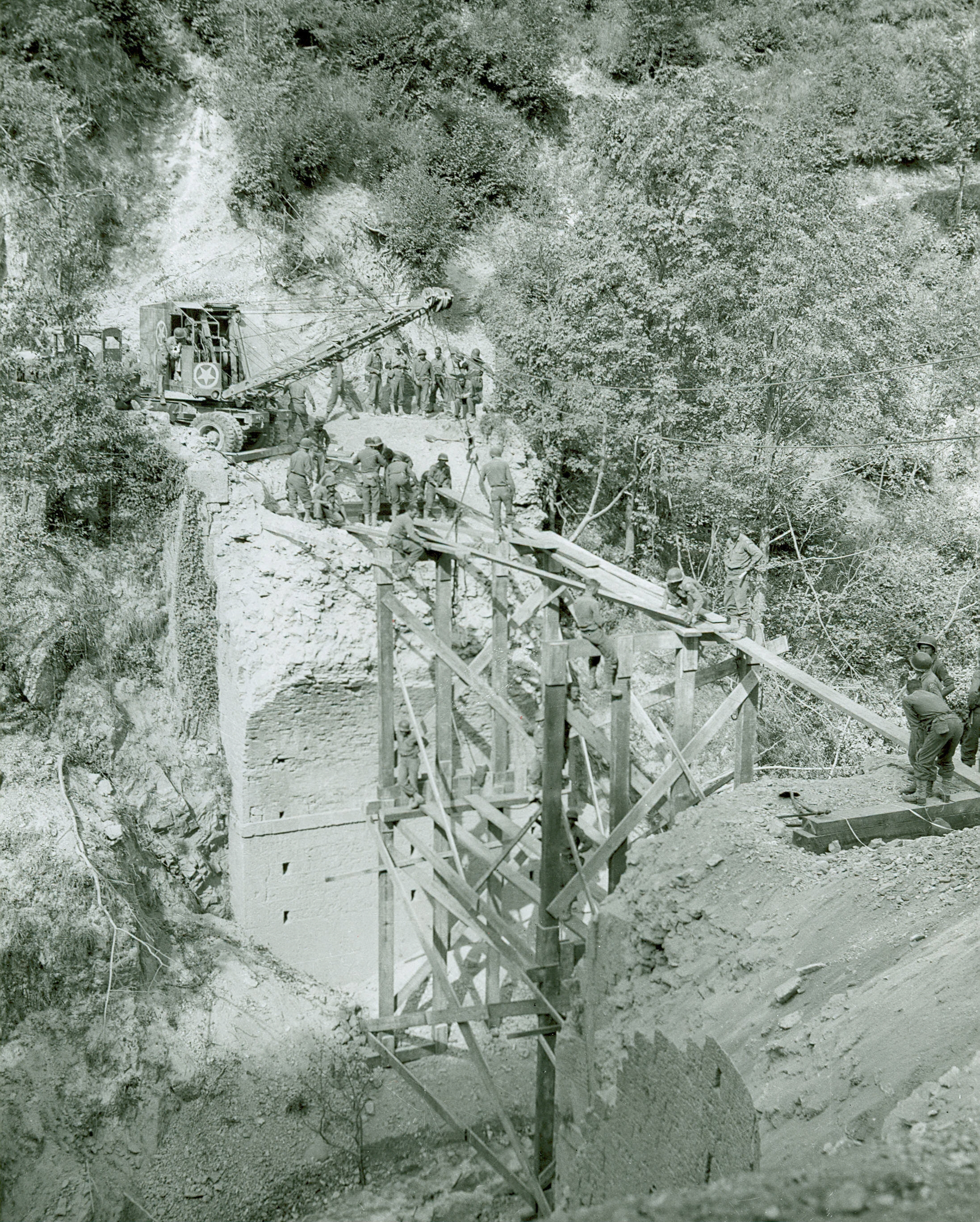
10th Engineer Battalion rebuilding bridge near Acerno

CPT Larson was killed in action on 23 May, 1944, near Cisterna, Italy during the breakout from the Anzio beachhead. Captain Larson was awarded the Distinguished Service Cross for his actions on that date (HQ, Seventh U.S. Army, General Orders No. 109, 1944), as well as being awarded the Bronze Star Medal (posthumously) for actions on that same date. The Distinguished Service Cross citation reads:

The President of the United States takes pride in presenting the Distinguished Service Cross (Posthumously) to Stanley Emil Larson (0-447252), Captain (Corps of Engineers), U.S. Army, for extraordinary heroism in connection with military operations against an armed enemy while serving with the 10th Engineers, in action against enemy forces on 23 May 1944. Captain Larson's intrepid actions, personal bravery and zealous devotion to duty at the cost of his life, exemplify the highest traditions of the military forces of the United States and reflect great credit upon himself, his unit, and the United States Army. Headquarters, Seventh U.S. Army, General Orders No. 109 (1944)

Larson was initially interred at Nettuno (Anzio), Italy. He was re-interred at the Golden Gate National Cemetery in San Bruno, California. He is buried in Section B, Site 521. His awards were presented to his wife, Virginia, in a ceremony held at the Presidio of San Francisco in July, 1945.

== Closure ==
Larson Barracks was closed on 28 March, 2007, and transferred under the control of the German government. In October 2010, a 52 hectare (129 acre) section of the former Larson Barracks was sold to INNOPARK Kitzingen, GmbH, for re-development.
