= Operation Brushwood =

1942 Allied landings in Africa in WWII

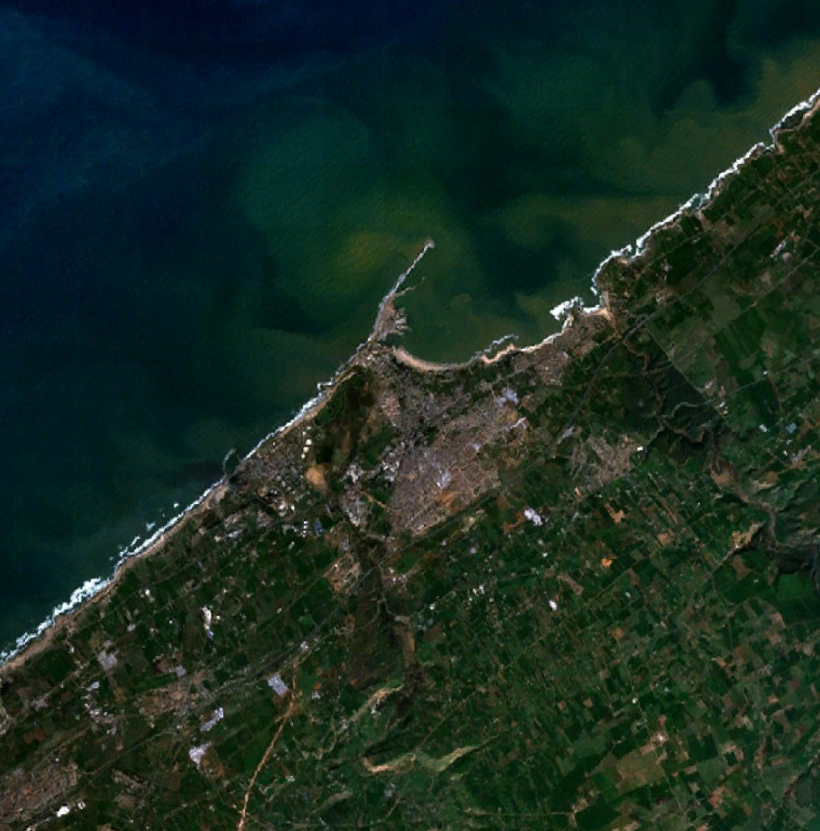
Mohammedia view from satellite NASA.

Operation Brushwood was a part of Operation Torch, Allied landings in Africa during World War II.

Taking place on 8 November 1942, the landings were intended to capture Fedhala as part of a larger operation to capture Casablanca in Morocco, 12 miles south of Fedhala.

Operation Brushwood forces landed in Fedhala, Morocco, then marched to nearby Casablanca.

A total of 19,364 officers and men were involved in the attack. Three regimental landing groups (RLGs) from the 7th, 15th, and 30th Infantry Regiments of the 3rd Infantry Division.

== Objectives ==
The main goal was to capture the town and port of Fedhala. Other objectives were to silence the coastal batteries, capture the roads and rail lines around Fedhala, and move south in order to surround Casablanca.

== Landings ==
The landings took place on a stretch of coastline between the Nefifikh and Mellah rivers. Singular battalion landing teams landed on four separate beaches within this four-mile-long zone.

Five coastal and antiaircraft batteries fired shells ranging from 75-mm to 138.6-mm in caliber. 2,500 garrison troops were stationed in Fedhala, along with 4,325 at Casablanca. Surrounding airfields could potentially supply up to fifty fighters and thirty bombers.

== See also ==
- US Naval Bases North Africa
- 7th Infantry Regiment
- 15th Infantry Regiment
- 30th Infantry Regiment
- 3rd Infantry Division
- 67th Armored Regiment (1st Battalion)
- 82nd Armored Reconnaissance Battalion
- 2nd Armored Division
- 756th Tank Battalion
