= 121st Street =

121st Street may refer to:

- 121st Street (Manhattan), a street in Manhattan, New York, United States
- 121st Street station (BMT Jamaica Line), a station in Queens, New York, United States
- 121st Street station (IRT Second Avenue Line), a closed station in Manhattan, New York, United States
