= 121 Squadron =

121 Squadron may refer to:

- No. 121 Squadron RAF, United Kingdom
- 121 Squadron, Republic of Singapore Air Force
- 121 Squadron SAAF, South Africa
- 121st Fighter Squadron, United States Air Force
- 121st Observation Squadron, United States Army Air Forces
- VAW-121, United States Navy
- VF-121, United States Navy
- VMFA-121, United States Marine Corps

== See also ==
- 121st Weather Flight
- 121st Air Refueling Wing
