= 121st Regiment =

121st Regiment or 121st Infantry Regiment may refer to:

- 121st Regiment of Foot (disambiguation), several units
- 121st Regiment (Xinjiang Production and Construction Corps), People's Republic of China
- 121st Infantry Regiment (France)
- 121st Anti-aircraft Artillery Regiment "Ravenna", Italy
- 121st Infantry Regiment "Macerata", Italy
- 121st Infantry Regiment (United States)
- 121st Field Artillery Regiment (United States)

== Union (Northern) Army in the American Civil War ==
- 121st New York Infantry Regiment
- 121st Ohio Infantry Regiment
- 121st Pennsylvania Infantry Regiment

== See also ==
- 121st Battalion (disambiguation)
- 121st Brigade (disambiguation)
- 121st Division (disambiguation)
