= 121 Squadron SAAF =

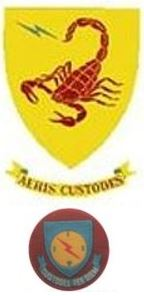
- 121 Squadron, part of 250 ADAG
- Active: 1970–1980s
- Country: South Africa
- Branch: South African Air Force
- Role: Missile based air defence

121 Squadron SAAF was a South African Air Force squadron formed in 1974 to operate the British Tigercat surface-to-air missile systems in an air defence role. The unit was disbanded when the Tigercat system was retired from service in the early 1990s.

== History and deployment ==
Press reports from 1974 state that South Africa acquired Tigercat missile systems from Jordan. The amount totalled 54 batteries. Under South African control, they were renamed Hilda.

The Hilda system was issued to the 250 Air Defence Artillery Group of the South African Air Force, which equipped its 121 and 123 Squadrons with them. The Squadron was based initially at AFB Waterkloof and then Pienaarsrivier.

On external deployments, the Hilda system was issued to 123 Squadron at AFB Grootfontein for Operation Savannah and 129 Squadron at AFB Ondangwa in South West Africa.

Live fire training was held at the St Lucia range in northern Natal.

250 ADAG was disbanded in 1993 and with it 121 Squadron and the Hilda System.

== The Hilda Missile System ==
Each Hilda system consisted of a trailer mounted Director and Launcher towed by diesel Land Rovers. The Launcher loaded three missiles at a go. A five-man complement, a generator and spare missiles were issued to each complement. The launcher and director was deployed by setting up the jacks and were connected to each other via cable link. The operator would launch a missile and guide it along a line of site to an approaching enemy aircraft by a joystick, issuing a radio command. The Hilda missile was small and subsonic, powered by a two-stage rocket motor and steered by four swept wings and stabilised by four tail fins.

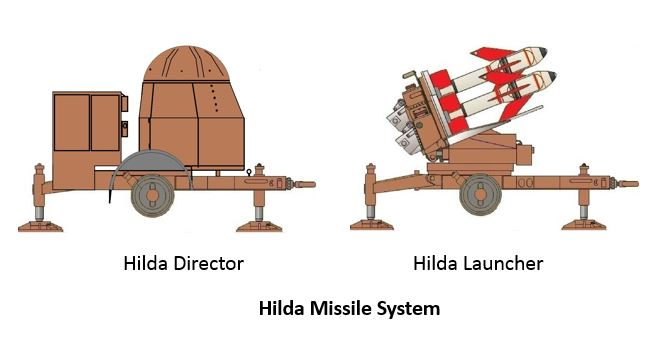

A Hilda missile, similar to that operated by 121 Squadron.
