= Parris (surname) =

Parris is a surname, and may refer to:

- Albion Parris (1788–1857), American judge and politician
- Alexander Parris (1780–1852), American architect
- Amanda Parris, Canadian broadcaster and writer
- Betty Parris (1682–1760), Accuser in the Salem witch trials, daughter of Samuel Parris
- Brandon Valentine-Parris (born 1995), Vincentian sprinter
- Christine Parris (born 1967), Canadian softball player
- Clyde Parris (1922–2016), Panamanian baseball player
- Dave Parris (born 1945), British boxer and referee
- Debbie Parris-Thymes (born 1973), Jamaican hurdler
- Eddie Parris (1911–1971), Welsh footballer
- Edmund Thomas Parris (1793–1873), English painter
- Emanuel Parris (born 1982), Canadian sprinter
- Francis Parris (1707–1760), British biblical scholar
- Frederick Parris (1867–1941), English cricketer and umpire
- Gary Parris (born 1950), American football player
- George Parris (born 1964), English footballer
- George van Parris (died 1551), Dutch Arian executed for heresy
- Georgios Parris (born 1950), Greek hurdler
- Gil Parris (born 1977), American guitarist
- Hume Parris (born 1940), Jamaican cricketer
- James Parris (1905–1997), Barbadian cricketer
- Janette Parris (born 1962), English artist
- Jason Parris (born 1982), Barbadian cricketer
- Joan-Patricia Parris, Canadian make-up artist
- John Parris (born 1952), British snooker cuemaker
- John Parris (footballer) (born 1974), Barbadian footballer
- Kaheem Parris (born 2000), Jamaican footballer
- Keith Parris (born 1905), Australian rules footballer
- Kenneth E. Parris III (born 1975), American painter
- Kirsten Parris (born 1969), Australian ecologist
- Leon Parris (born 1981), British writer, composer and actor
- Leonel Parris (born 1982), Panamanian footballer
- London Parris (1931–1992), American singer
- Mason Parris (born 1999), American wrestler
- Matthew Parris (born 1949), British journalist and politician
- Nikita Parris (born 1994), English footballer
- Pat Parris (politician), Barbadian politician
- Patricia Parris, American actress
- Rachel Parris (born 1984), English comedian
- R. Rex Parris, American attorney and politician
- Rebecca Parris (1951–2018), American singer
- Reiss Elliott-Parris (born 2007), Guyanese footballer
- Rhianna Parris-Smith (born 2002), British track cyclist
- Richard Parris (born 1845), Barbadian Barbadian cricketer
- Robbie Parris, Canadian basketball player and coach
- Robert Parris (1924–1999), America composer and academic
- Robert Parris (judge) (1816–1904), New Zealand politician, public servant and judge
- Rudy Parris (born 1965), American musician
- Samuel Parris (1653–1720), American minister in Salem
- Samuel B. Parris (1806–1827), American physician and poet
- Shane Parris (born 1990), Dutch footballer
- Shaqkere Parris (born 2003), West Indian cricketer
- Stanford Parris (1929–2010), American lawyer and politician from Virginia
- Stanton Parris (1930–2009), Barbadian cricket umpire
- S. J. Parris, pseudonym of Stephanie Merritt (born 1974), English literary critic and writer
- Steve Parris (born 1967), American baseball player
- Teyonah Parris (born 1987), American actress
- Timon Parris (born 1995), American football player
- Virgil D. Parris (1807–1874), American politician from Maine
- Weston Parris (died 1992), Nevisian public servant

== See also ==
- Paris (surname)
- Parrish (surname)
- Parish (surname)
- Parys (surname)
