= Parris =

Parris is both a given name and surname. Notable people with the name include:

== Given name ==
- Parris Afton Bonds, American novelist
- Parris Campbell (born 1997), American football player
- Parris Duffus (born 1970), retired American ice hockey goaltender
- Parris Glendening (born 1942), American politician
- Parris Goebel (born 1991), New Zealand-born choreographer, director, singer, dancer, actress of Samoan descent
- Parris Mosteller (born 2001), American child actor

== Surname ==
- Parris (surname)

== See also ==
- Paris (surname)
- Paris (given name)
