= Parrish (surname) =

Parrish as an English surname. Notable people with the surname include:

- Alan K. Parrish, American academic and biographer
- Allison Parrish, American creative code and poet
- Andrew Parrish (born 1976), American soccer player
- Andy Parrish (born 1988), English footballer
- Anne Parrish (1888–1957), American writer
- Anne Parrish (philanthropist) (1760–1800), American philanthropist
- Augustus Parrish (born 1987), American football player
- Avery Parrish (1917–1959), American jazz pianist, composer and arranger
- Bernard Parrish (1919–1999), American politician
- Bernie Parrish (1936–2019), American football player
- Butch Parrish (born 1941), American politician from Georgia
- Caitlin Parrish, American dramatist
- Carolyn Parrish (born 1946), Canadian politician
- Celestia Susannah Parrish (1853–1918), American educator and psychologist
- Charles H. Parrish (1859–1931), American civil rights activist, theologian and president of Simmons University
- Cherish Parrish (born 1989), American Pottawatomi and Odawa black ash basket maker
- Chris Parrish (born 1979), American water skier
- Clara Weaver Parrish (1861–1925), American painter
- Dan Parrish (born 1983), American football player
- David Parrish (1939–2021), American artist
- Dean Parrish (1942–2021), American singer
- Deanie Parrish (1922–2022), American aviator
- Debra Parrish, American academic administrator
- Dillwyn Parrish (1894–1941), American writer and painter
- Dominique Parrish (born 1996), American freestyle wrestler
- Don Parrish (1955–2021), American football player
- Don Parrish (adventurer) (born 1944), American adventurer
- Doug Parrish (born 1992), Canadian football player
- Drew Parrish (born 1997), American baseball player
- Dwight Parrish (born 1972), American ice hockey player
- Edward Parrish (1822–1872), American pharmacist and college president
- Elizabeth Parrish (1925–2022), American actress and singer
- Essie Pinola Parrish (1902–1979), American Kashaya Pomo leaader, basketweaver and medicine woman
- Ethel Post-Parrish (died 1960), American Spiritualist medium
- E. C. Parrish, American politician from California
- Gary Parrish, American sports journalist
- George Parrish (racing driver) (1928–2016), American racecar driver from North Carolina
- George F. Parrish (1897–1971), American athlete
- Geraldine Parrish (1936–2004), American murderer
- Gigi Parrish (1912–2006), American actress
- Graydon Parrish (born 1970), American painter
- Harry J. Parrish (1922–2006), American politician
- Helen Parrish (1923–1959), American actress
- Henry Parrish Jr. (born 2001), American football player
- Howard Parrish (1891–1965), United States Army officer, recipient of the Legion of Merit
- Hunter Parrish (born 1987), American actor and singer
- Isaac Parrish (1804–1860), American politician from Ohio
- Jacob Parrish (born 2004), American football player
- James Parrish (1968–2004), American gridiron football player
- Janel Parrish (born 1988), American actress and musician
- Janneke Parrish (born 1990/1), American workers' rights activist
- Jason B. Parrish (1878–1906), American football player and coach
- Jasper Parrish (1767–1836), American interpreter and diplomat
- Jerry Wayne Parrish (1944–1998), American defector to North Korea
- Jesse J. Parrish (1877–1948), American citrus grower and politician in Florida
- Jill Parrish (born 1961), American judge
- Jim Parrish (born 1946), American politician from Kansas
- Joanna Parrish (1969–1990), English student and murder victim
- Joe Parrish (born 1995), English guitarist
- Joel Parrish (born 1955), American football player
- John Parrish (baseball) (born 1977), American baseball player
- John W. Parrish (born 1939), American journalist and university administrator
- Josiah Lamberson Parrish (1806–1895), American missionary in Oregon
- Judith Totman Parrish, British–American geologist and paleoclimatologist
- Julia Parrish, American ecologist and conservation biologist
- Julie Parrish (1940–2003), American actress
- Julie Parrish (politician) (born 1974), American politician from Oregon
- Justin Parrish (born 1984), American football player
- Katy Parrish (born 1991), Australian paralympic athlete
- Kehlani Parrish known as Kehlani (born 1995), American singer and songwriter
- Ken Parrish (born 1984), American football player
- Lance Parrish (born 1956), American baseball player and manager
- Larry Parrish (born 1953), American baseball player and manager
- Laverne Parrish (1918–1945), United States Army Medal of Honor recipient
- Lemar Parrish (born 1947), American football player and coach
- Leslie Parrish (born 1935), American actress
- Lucian W. Parrish (1878–1922), American politician from Texas
- Man Parrish (born 1958), American musician and producer
- Mark Parrish (born 1977), American ice hockey player
- Mary Jones Parrish (1892–1972), African-American journalist
- Mary Virginia Cook Parrish (1862–1945), African American activist
- Maud Parrish (born 1878), American travel writer
- Maxfield Parrish (1870–1966), American painter and illustrator
- Mi-Ai Parrish, American journalist
- Micah Parrish (born 2001), American basketball player
- Michael Parrish, British political candidate
- Nancy Parrish (born 1948), American politician and judge from Kansas
- Noel F. Parrish (1909–1987), United States Air Force general
- P. J. Parrish, American novelist duo's pseudonym
- Patrick Parrish, United States Army officer on the Guantanamo Military Commission
- Paul Parrish, American singer, songwriter and pianist
- Peyton Parrish (born 1996), American musician
- Randall Parrish (1858–1923), American novelist
- Randall R. Parrish, American isotope geologist
- Rebecca Parrish (1869–1952), American medical missionary and physician
- Roan Parrish, American author
- Robert Parrish (1916–1995), American film editor
- Roscoe Parrish (born 1982), American football player
- Roy Earl Parrish (1888–1918), American lawyer and politician
- Samuel B. Parrish (1838–1897), American Indian Agent
- Sean Parrish (born 1972), Welsh footballer and coach
- Shaandiin Parrish (born c.1994)), American member of the Navajo Nation Council
- Spencer Parrish (born 1997), American composer and pianist
- Stacy Parrish (born 1968), American singwriter and musician
- Stan Parrish (1946–2022), American football player and coach
- Stephen Parrish (1846–1938), American painter
- Steve Parrish (born 1953), British motorcycle racer
- Steven C. Parrish (born 1950), American lawyer, executive and consultant
- Sydney Parrish (born 2001), American basketball player
- Theo Parrish (born 1972), American DJ and record producer
- Tony Parrish (born 1975), American football player
- Warren Parrish (1803–1877), American LDS leader
- William Parrish (1860–1949), Canadian politician from Manitoba
- Zack Parrish (born 1983), American video game composer

== See also ==
- Parrish Sisters, duo of American photographers
- Murder of Joanna Parrish in 1990
- Parish (surname)
