= Jean Schoen Smith =

American female traveler and author (born c. 1897)

Jean Schoen Smith (born Jeanette Schoen; c. 1897 – after 1983) was an American traveler, author, and poet who, in the 1920s, undertook solo and crewed voyages across West Africa and the Pacific Ocean at a time when such travel by women was uncommon. In 1926, she and Viola Irene Cooper sailed as working midshipmen aboard the barque Bougainville (formerly the Star of Peru) from Vancouver to New Caledonia, a voyage described in Cooper's 1929 book Windjamming to Fiji. Schoen completed a fifteen month, 30,000 mile circumnavigation of the globe and returned to New York in November 1927. She later published a memoir, Sins of Commission, Thank God: Down the Years and Across the World (1983), through the National Maritime Historical Society.

== Early life and education ==
Schoen was born in St. Louis, Missouri, the daughter of Isaac A. Schoen and Florence Hellman Schoen. The family resided at 5741 McPherson Avenue in St. Louis. Her father operated a fur brokerage business in the city.

She graduated from Soldan High School in St. Louis and attended the University of Missouri for two years before transferring to the University of Illinois, where she received a degree in landscape gardening in 1919. After graduation, she accepted a position as a landscape gardener in Minneapolis, Minnesota.

== Career ==
=== West Africa expedition ===
In the early 1920s, Schoen left her landscape gardening career to pursue travel. She enrolled in business school, purchased a portable typewriter, and secured a position with a shipping company in New York City, where she studied ships and navigation in preparation for overseas travel.

Schoen sailed from Marseille aboard the French cargo and passenger ship Kowioussa. The vessel carried sixteen white passengers, three of them women, along with 750 Senegalese soldiers returning to their home posts. Her first port of call in Africa was Dakar, Senegal.

Over the following months, Schoen traveled along the West African coast, visiting Bathurst (the Gambia), Konakry (French Guinea), Free Town (Sierra Leone), Lome (Togoland), and Lagos (Nigeria). In Lagos, she obtained employment with the United States Shipping Board. According to the Post-Dispatch, Shipping Board officials told Schoen that no white woman had previously been employed in that capacity on the West African coast.

Schoen subsequently traveled aboard the American freighter West Irmo up the Congo River to Matadi in the Belgian Congo. The West Irmo was a steel cargo steamship built for the United States Shipping Board during World War I. During the river voyage, Schoen witnessed a mutiny among members of the ship's crew. The ship's captain fired on two men who had rushed the bridge; one was struck and fell to the deck. Schoen, who had stenographic training, took down testimony from witnesses and prepared the reports.

Her father, Isaac Schoen, died on August 24, 1924, at New Rochelle, New York. News of his death reached Schoen at Matadi by cable from her mother, and she returned to the United States. The entire West African journey lasted approximately eight months.

=== Voyage aboard the Bougainville ===
In 1926, Schoen and her friend Viola Irene Cooper, a writer and journalist who had published on Indian politics in The Open Court journal, learned that the Star of Peru, an iron hulled barque built in 1863 in Sunderland, England, would make a final sailing voyage before being converted to a storage barge. The vessel had been purchased by the French Compagnie Navale de l'Océanie and renamed the Bougainville.

Schoen and Cooper sought to join the Bougainville as working crew, but shipping agents and captains in San Francisco repeatedly refused them. As the dust jacket of Cooper's later book recounted, the two women faced "many rebuffs in San Francisco shipping circles" before persuading French Captain Leon Chateauvieux to hire them as midshipmen, a position traditionally restricted to men in training for officer rank. The Bougainville departed Vancouver on September 17, 1926, bound for New Caledonia by way of Fiji. With the exception of her final passage from Europe, Schoen's entire journey around the world was made on sailing vessels and freighters on which she was entered as a midshipman. Cooper served as the official keeper of the ship's log and journal during the roughly two month Pacific crossing. During the voyage, Schoen composed a poem titled "The Last Passage," written from the perspective of the ship, recounting its history from clipper to salmon fleet vessel to its final fate as a storage barge in Noumea.

After arriving in the South Pacific, Schoen and Cooper parted ways. Schoen continued sailing among the islands aboard the inter-island schooner Loyaute. According to the New York Times, Schoen and Cooper also "cruised among the New Hebrides in a 600 ton steamer," after which Schoen traveled to New Zealand while Cooper went to Sydney, Australia.

=== Circumnavigation ===
Schoen continued traveling alone, completing a circumnavigation of the globe. She traveled by sailing vessels and freighters for most of the journey, serving as a midshipman until February 1927 and paying her own passage from port to port thereafter. The entire trip covered approximately 30,000 miles over fifteen months.

On November 14, 1927, Schoen arrived in New York from London aboard the American Farmer of the American Merchant Lines. Cooper, who had returned to New York the previous June, met Schoen at the pier. Both women told reporters that they expected to set out in search of further travel the following spring.

== Personal life ==
Schoen later married a man named William T. Smith and thereafter used the name Jean Schoen Smith or Jean S. Smith. The date and circumstances of the marriage have not been established in published sources.

In her memoir, Smith wrote of her acquaintance with Maud Parrish, another American woman traveler of the same era who claimed to have circled the globe sixteen times and later published her own account of her journeys, Nine Pounds of Luggage (1939).

Her death date is not recorded in available sources; she was alive as late as 1983, when her memoir was published.

== Works ==
=== Windjamming to Fiji (1929) ===
Schoen's voyage aboard the Bougainville was the principal subject of Cooper's book Windjamming to Fiji, published in 1929 by Rae D. Henkle Co. in New York, with an introduction by Captain Chateauvieux. The dust jacket of the first edition described Schoen and Cooper as "two adventuring American maids" and carried the epigraph: "If she will do't, she will; and there's an end on't." The book contained 22 photographic plates and endpaper maps tracing the ship's course from Vancouver to New Caledonia. It was reprinted by A.L. Burt Company the same year and has been reissued several times, including by Kessinger Publishing (2007) and Literary Licensing (2013). Cooper's papers, including materials related to the voyage, are held in the Hartzell Spence Papers at the University of Iowa Special Collections.

=== Sins of Commission, Thank God (1983) ===
In 1983, Smith published her memoir, Sins of Commission, Thank God: Down the Years and Across the World, through the National Maritime Historical Society in Peekskill, New York. The book runs to 405 pages and its subtitle indicates coverage of a lifetime of global travel.

=== "The Last Passage" (1983) ===
Also in 1983, Sea History magazine published "The Last Passage," a poem Schoen had composed aboard the Bougainville during the 1926 voyage. The poem was written from the perspective of the ship and traced its career from clipper service through its years in the Alaska Packers Association salmon fleet to its final voyage to Noumea, where it was converted to a storage barge. The editors of Sea History noted it was the first poem the magazine had published. The issue included a photograph of Schoen boarding the inter-island schooner Loyaute in the South Pacific and a photograph of the Bougainville (identified by its earlier name Himalaya) at its final mooring in Noumea.

== See also ==
- Maud Parrish
- Star of Peru
- List of women explorers and travelers
