= Parys (name) =

Parys is a given name and surname. Notable people with the name include:

== Given name ==
- Parys Filippi (1836–1874), Polish sculptor
- Parys Haralson (born 1984), American football linebacker

== Surname ==
- Parys (surname)

== See also ==
- Van Parys, surname
- Paris (given name)
- Paris (surname)
