= Parys (surname) =

Parys is a surname, and may refer to:

- Jan Parys (born 1950), Polish politician
- Lorin Parys (born 1976), Belgian lawyer and politician
- Magdalena Parys (born 1971), Polish writer and translator
- Robert Parys (died 1408), English Member of Parliament
- Ronald G. Parys (1938–2007), American politician from Wisconsin

== See also ==
- Van Parys
- Paris (surname)
- Parris (surname)
