= Light in the Darkness (band) =

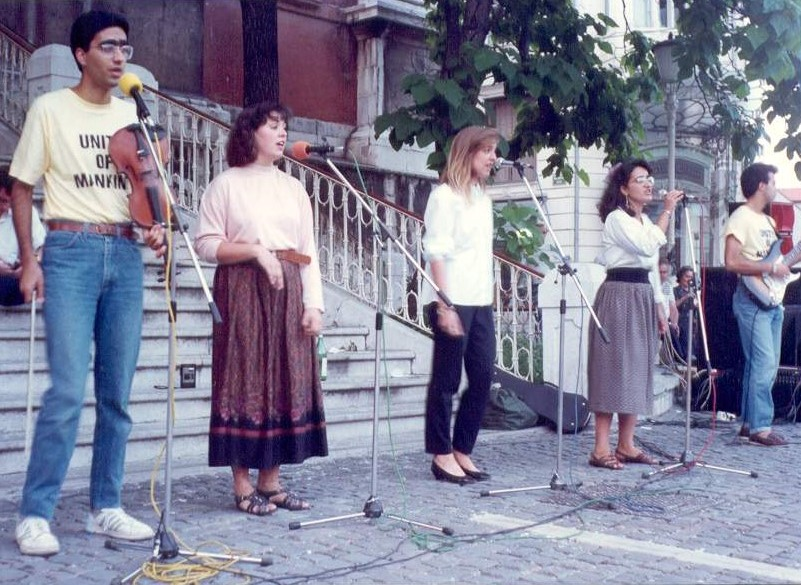
- Light in the Darkness, Ljubljana, Slovenia, 1990

Background information
- Genres: Pop rock
- Years active: 1988–1994

Light in the Darkness was an Italian pop rock band formed in Italy in 1988. The band recorded two albums in the 90s and toured extensively in their own country as well as in Europe, with performances also in Asia and North America. They composed various songs, including "Tablet of Carmel" (1989) and Shape Europe" (1994),

The band's classic line-up consisted of founding members Olinga Mazlum and Fabio Bolsi (piano and vocals), Vargha Mazlum (violin and vocals), Victor Sobhani and Alessandro Giua (guitar and vocals), Corrado Todrani (guitar, drums, and vocals), and vocalists Emilia Mazlum, Gloria Mazlum, Giulia Kheyrkhah, Roberta Kheyrkhah, Jalan Youssefian, Sharim Youssefian, Nadia Sobhani, Omid Varjavandi and Nima Sanai.

== History ==
=== Formation and early years (1988–1990) ===
The Mazlum brothers, Olinga, Emilia, Gloria and Vargha had created and been involved in the 80s with the theatrical group 'Il Risveglio' and had performed extensively around Italy. In late 1988, the Mazlum brothers along with other youth, including Fabio Bolsi, Victor & Nadia Sobhani, Alessandro Giua, Corrado Todrani, Giulia & Roberta Kheyrkhah, Jalan & Sharim Youssefian and Omid Varjavandi, met with the intention of forming the band, which took the name 'Light in the Darkness'. The name of the band comes from a song written by Mark Spiro and performed by Leslie & Kelly few years earlier. The band first met in Perugia in the winter of 1988 to compose their first songs and had their first performance in Rimini.

The band had the peculiarity of having interchangeable background singers who would, from time to time, join the band on the various tours.

In the spring of 1989, they held concerts in Perugia, Verona, Perugia, Catania, Bologna. During their summer tour of 1989, Light in the Darkness had their first introduction to an international audience at the European Youth Conference in San Marino. After the conference, they went on tour with performances in Portici and Paola. They returned to Portici again in September for a further concert, and the year ended with another concert in Fiesole. Portici is one of the most densely populated city in Europe and has been facing significant problems of social degradation, crime, and poor quality of life. In early 1990, they held concerts in Gela, Portici, Ischia, Velletri and Verona. During their stay in Bari to prepare for the tournee, the group was the victim of an attack by some drunk men, resulting in injury to their keyboard player, Olinga Mazlum. Nevertheless, the tour went on according to schedule, starting with Campobasso, followed by Ljubljana (Slovenia), Zagreb (Croatia), Portici, Ercolano, Catania, Cagliari, Sassari and ending in Bastia, in the island of Corsica, France for a Mediterranean conference attended by Hand of the Cause Rúhíyyih Khánum.

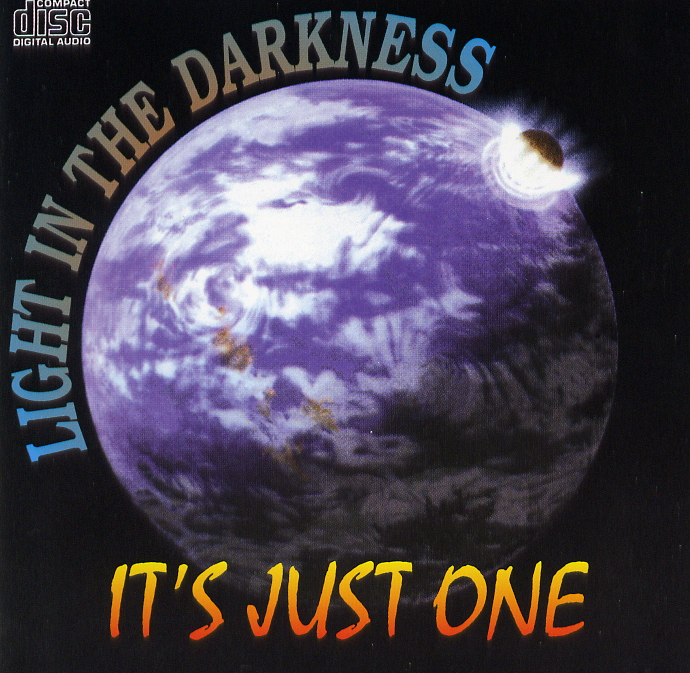
Light in the Darkness, 'It's Just One', 1994

In the fall, they had concerts in Monza, Velletri, Firenze, L'Aquila, Monza and Prato and then returned for the end of the year to Ljubljana and Zagreb.

In Ljubljana and Zagreb there was a very strong response from the public. Particularly high was the interest from the mass media; various radio stations interviewed the band, some TV stations broadcast live concerts and many newspapers reported about their concerts. This brought them to become more international focused, particularly on the Eastern European countries at a difficult time of regime change and where the population was particularly eager for a message of change and personal transformation.

In the spring of 1991, a few more concerts followed in Italy, in Pescara and Firenze. Their third tournee brought them to Poland with concerts in the cities of Gdańsk, Wroclaw and Kraków, and then to Romania, where they participated in the First Bahá'í Youth Conference of the ex-eastern block in Neptun. Then they returned to Italy with concerts in Portici and Acuto and then back to Romania to hold concerts in Timișoara and Drobeta-Turnu Severin. In the fall of 1991, they took a break from touring to record their first album, 'Just as a flame'.

=== Career peak (1990–1993) ===
1992 started with concerts in Monza, Ancona and Portici, followed by their fourth tour which brought them to some new Eastern European countries like Slovakia (with concerts in Bratislava, Trnava and Martin), Czech Rep. (with concerts in Znojmo, Kyjov and Brno), Hungary (with concerts in Abaliget by the lake Balaton, Pécs, Békéscsaba and Szeged), and Albania (with concerts in Tirana, Shkodër and Durrës). Albania had just opened to the west that year and faced a severe economic crisis. At the end of the year, the group was invited to perform at a prestigious worldwide event, the second Baháʼí World Congress, in New York. The band ended the year with some more concerts in Zagreb.

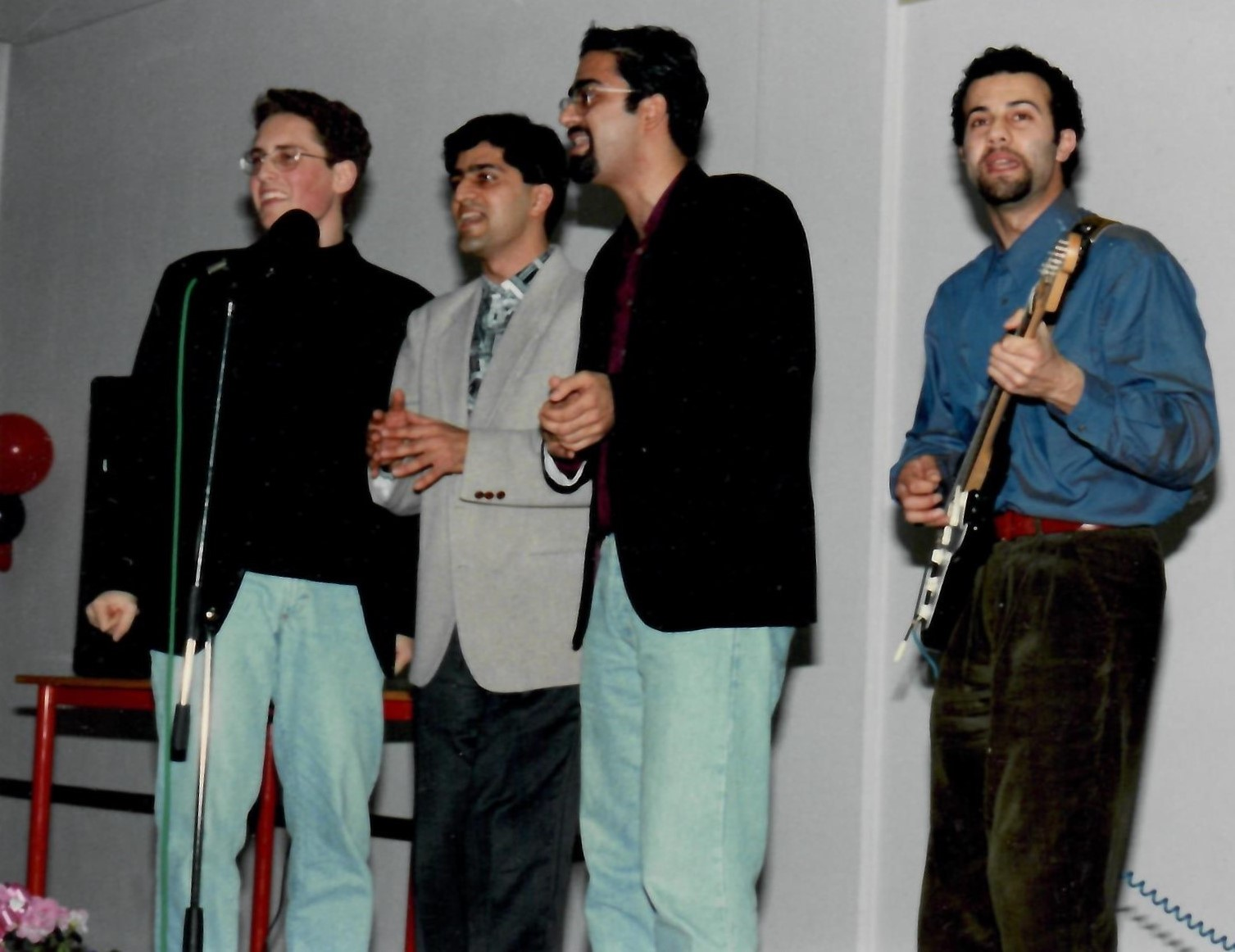
Light in the Darkness, concert in Grosseto, Italy 1994

1993 started with concerts in Italy, in the cities of Rieti and Verona. Their fifth tournee brought them back to Albania with concerts in the cities of Patos, Berat, Fier, passing through Edirne (Turkey), and then they headed to Bulgaria (Burgas, Ruse and Varna) and Romania (Costinești) passing through Edirne in Turkey. Mantua was their last Italian concert of 1993.

In early 1994, they returned for a few concerts in Croatia (Pazin, Poreč and Pula) that were followed by a series of concerts in Italy, in the cities of Scandicci, Grosseto, Mantua, Florence, Lucca, Livorno and Campobasso. In spring, they were invited to participate to the election of the first Slovenia-Croatian Bahá'í Regional Assembly. Their sixth tournee saw them performing in Germany (Berlin, Zerbst, Leipzig and Dresden), from where they headed to the Baltic states, performing in Lithuania (Ukmergė and Visiginas), Latvia (Jelgava) and Estonia (Pärnu). One of their most famous songs, 'Shape Europe' was released on the occasion of this tour, an anthem for Europe's youth to embrace and work for a better world.

=== Breakup (1994) ===
The summer tour of 1994 was a watershed for the band. When the tour ended, many members quit the band, and new members were invited to join. Although this second experience was short-lived, it still brought the band to a few more concerts that year in Parma, Italy, and helped them record their second album, 'It's Just One'.

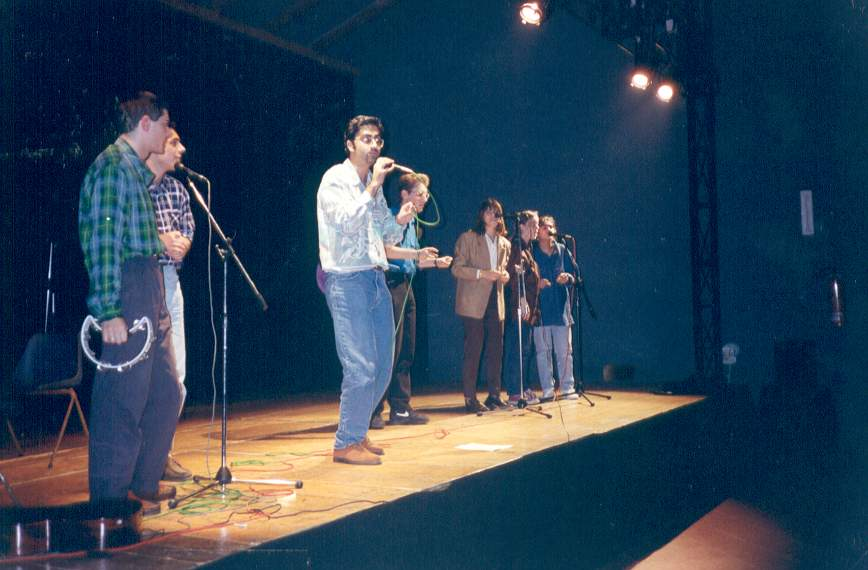
Light in the Darkness, Parma, Italy 1994

In 1995, the 'new' band had a few concerts in Italy in Voghera, Portoferraio, Bologna and Povoletto and embarked on its last tour, which took them to Slovenia (Skofja Loka, Ljubljana, and Kranj), Lithuania (Kaunas, Vilnius and Klaipėda) and Hungary (Zánka-Köveskál). In spring, they had their last concert in Genoa and after In the month of December, the group unanimously decided to split up.

=== Re-formation (1996) ===
In 1996, though, there was a final revival, as they were requested to represent the International Bahá'í community at the United Nations Habitat II conference in Istanbul, Turkey. Light in the Darkness performed two more concerts, one in Bursa and one at the UN conference itself. For their collaboration at the UN conference, they received a certificate of appreciation from the organizing committee. The band members are now scattered throughout the world and are still involved in performing arts: Olinga Mazlum is a music teacher; Alessandro Giua is a solo singer, producer, and voice actor; Vargha Mazlum is a producer and a filmmaker; Jalan Youssefian is a photographer and fashion designer; Gloria Mazlum is a singer; Omid Varjavandi is a dancer; Emilia Mazlum is a videomaker; and so forth.

== Members ==
=== Members ===
- Olinga Mazlum – keyboards, and backing vocals
- Vargha Mazlum – violin, lead & backing vocals
- Victor Sobhani – electric & acoustic guitar, backing vocals
- Alessandro Giua – guitar, lead & backing vocals
- Fabio Bolsi – keyboards, lead & backing vocals
- Corrado Todrani – drums, acoustic guitar, lead & backing vocals
- Jalan Youssefian – backing vocals
- Sharim Youssefian – backing vocals
- Emilia Mazlum – backing vocals
- Omid Varjavandi – backing vocals
- Gloria Mazlum – backing vocals
- Giulia Kheyrkhah – lead & backing vocals
- Roberta Kheryrkhah – backing vocals
- Nima Sanai – lead & backing vocals

=== Touring with other artists ===
- Paul Parrish – San Marino (1989)
- Omid Djalili – Slovakia (1992)
- Bijan Khadem-Missagh – Czech Republic (1992)
- El Viento Canta and Merz – United States of America (1992)
- Wildfire – United States of America (1992)
- Kevin Locke – Turkey (1994)

== Discography ==
Studio albums

- Just as a Flame (1990)
- It's Just One (1994)

Just as a Flame track listing
No.	Title	Writers	Arrangement	Lyrics
1.	"Questo é fede"	Fabio Bolsi	Victor Sobhani, Vargha Mazlum	Amatu'l-Bahà Ruhiyyih Khànum
2.	"The prisoner"	Lenz, Cameron, and Sheper	Fabio Bolsi, Victor Sobhani, Olinga Mazlum, Vargha Mazlum	Lenz, Cameron, and Sheper
3.	"Song of Badì"	Stephen Miller	Vargha Mazlum, Olinga Mazlum	Stephen Miller
4.	"L'antico dei giorni"	Neysan Parsa	Victor Sobhani	Bahaullah
5.	"Se non ti fermerai"	Ahmad Parsa, Adolfo Crea	Olinga Mazlum, Victor Sobhani, Simone Cozzi, Vargha Mazlum	Ahmad Parsa, Adolfo Crea
6.	"Tablet of Carmel"	Fabio Bolsi	Corrado Todrani, Vargha Mazlum	Bahà'u'llàh
7.	"What we call love (a Nura)"	Corrado Todrani	Alessandro Giua, Corrado Todrani	Alessandro Giua
8.	"Flight"	Fabio Bolsi	Fabio Bolsi, Vargha Mazlum	Vargha Mazlum
9.	"Parola celata"	Olinga Mazlum, Victor Sobhani	Olinga Mazlum, Victor Sobhani	Bahà'u'llàh

It's Just One track listing
No.	Title	Writers	Arrangement	Lyrics
1.	"Intro"	Christian Bresciani		Abdu'l-Bahà
2.	"Shape Europe"	Victor Sobhani	Vargha Mazlum, Olinga Mazlum	Vargha Mazlum, Nima Sanai, Nadia Sobhani
3.	"Hope"	Christian Bresciani	Vargha Mazlum, Christian Bresciani	Farhud Tebiani
4.	"Listen!"	Vargha Mazlum, Nima Sanai	Vargha Mazlum, Nima Sanai	Nima Sanai
5.	"Echoes from the Past"	Christian Petzold	Giorgio Moroder	
6.	"Cry in"	Christian Bresciani	Christian Bresciani	Christian Bresciani, Anis Parsa, Farhud Tebiani
7.	"The Tablet of Carmel"	Fabio Bolsi	Corrado Todrani, Vargha Mazlum	Bahà'u'llàh
8.	"Rainy"	Victor Sobhani, Olinga Mazlum	Vargha Mazlum, Olinga Mazlum, Nima Sanai	Vargha Mazlum, Nima Sanai
9.	"Me and You"	Enzo Perriello	Vargha Mazlum & Fabio Bolsi	Vargha Mazlum
10.	"Lightechno"	Simone Cozzi, Victor Sobhani, Nima Sanai	Vargha Mazlum, Olinga Mazlum, Corrado Todrani	Nima Sanai
11.	"The Fire Tablet"	Alban Tuna	Alban Tuna, Vargha Mazlum	Bahà'u'llàh
