= Viola Irene Cooper =

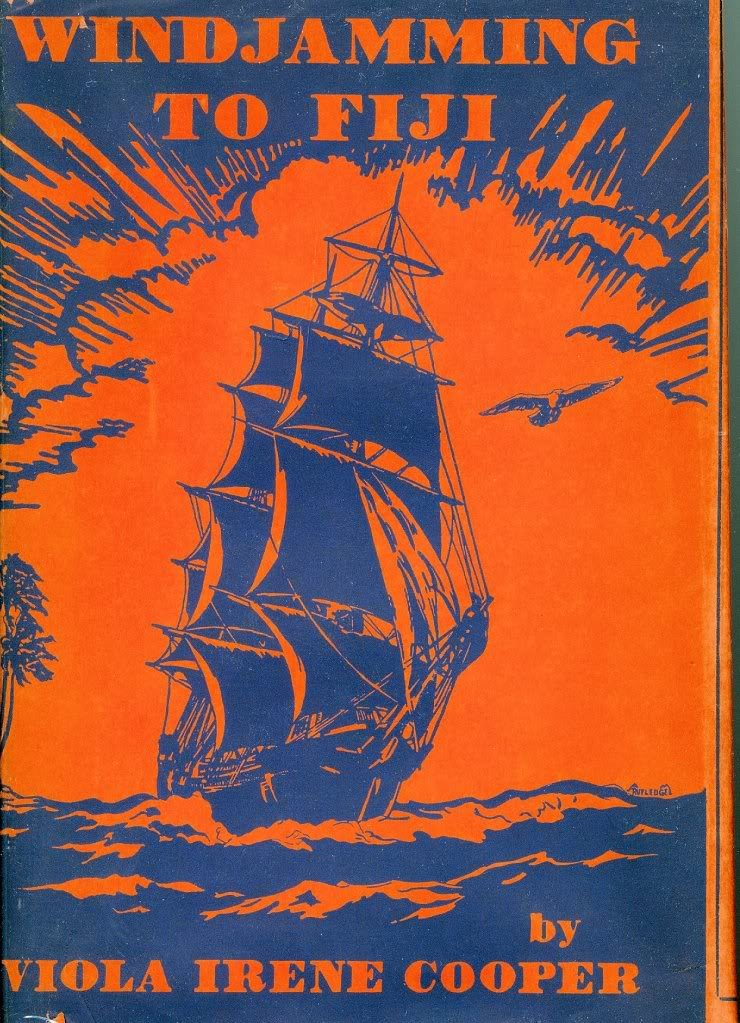
Cooper's 1929 book, Windjamming to Fiji

Viola Irene Cooper (née Buckley; March 19, 1894 – March 22, 1951) was an American writer and traveler. She is known for her 1929 book Windjamming to Fiji, an account of her 1926 voyage as one of two female midshipmen aboard the French barque Bougainville on its final Pacific crossing.

== Early career ==
Viola Irene Buckley was born on March 19, 1894, in San Jose, California, to Hester (Cobb) and Alfred Buckley.

Her earliest known publication was an article titled "Gandhi and the Untouchables", which appeared in The Open Court, a philosophical and religious journal published in Chicago, in June 1926. No institutional affiliation was listed for Cooper in the article.

== Voyage of the Bougainville ==
In 1926, Cooper was living in New York City when she learned that the barque Star of Peru, a 63 year old iron hulled sailing vessel originally built in 1863 in Sunderland, England, would make a final voyage to the Pacific before being retired as a storage barge. Cooper and her companion Jean Schoen sought passage on the ship. According to the dust jacket of Windjamming to Fiji, the two women faced "many rebuffs in San Francisco shipping circles" before persuading the ship's commander, Captain Leon Chateauvieux, to take them aboard as midshipmen.

The ship, rechristened the Bougainville under French ownership by the Compagnie Navale de l'Océanie, departed Vancouver, British Columbia, on September 17, 1926. Cooper served as the official keeper of the ship's log and journal during the approximately two month trans Pacific passage. The vessel sailed to Suva, Fiji, and then continued to Nouméa, New Caledonia, where it was permanently retired from sailing and converted into a storage barge for nickel ore.

After reaching New Caledonia, Cooper and Schoen continued traveling separately. The two women cruised the New Hebrides (present day Vanuatu) together aboard a 600-ton steamer, after which Schoen went to New Zealand and Cooper traveled to Sydney, Australia. Cooper returned to New York by June 1927.

== Windjamming to Fiji ==
Cooper's account of the voyage was published in 1929 as Windjamming to Fiji by Rae D. Henkle Co. Inc. of New York. The book ran to 295 pages and included a frontispiece photograph of the Bougainville, 21 full page photographic plates, and map endpapers tracing the ship's route. Captain Chateauvieux wrote the introduction. The book was reprinted the same year by A.L. Burt Company.

As of August of that year, Cooper's account remained in manuscript. publishers had expressed interest in the manuscript that became Windjamming to Fiji "which other publishers have feared to print because of the public's temporarily awakened skepticism in regard to the authenticity of stories about the high seas written by young women who have worn oilskins". At least one publisher indicated they would print the work if she obtained a letter from Lincoln Colcord confirming the story's authenticity.

The book was reprinted several times in the 21st century, including editions by Kessinger Publishing (2006, 2007, 2010), Literary Licensing LLC (2013), and Gyan Books (2018).

== Later life ==
Cooper died on March 22, 1951, at Goldwater Memorial Hospital on Roosevelt Island in New York City.

== Archival materials ==
Four items connected to Cooper are preserved in Box 10 of the Hartzell Spence Papers at the University of Iowa Special Collections. Spence (1908–2001) was an American journalist and author who served as founding editor of Yank, the Army Weekly. The nature of the Cooper materials in the collection has not been described in the publicly available finding aid.

== Works ==
- Windjamming to Fiji (New York: Rae D. Henkle Co. Inc., 1929)
- "Gandhi and the Untouchables," The Open Court, vol. 1926, no. 6 (June 1, 1926)
