= Paris (given name) =

Paris is a unisex given name. It is of Greek origin and is common among Anglophone countries.

== Notable people with the name ==
=== Women ===
- Paris Bennett (born 1988), singer on American Idol
- Paris Berelc (born 1998), American actress and model
- Paris Campbell Grace (born 1992), American TikToker, singer, and comedian
- Paris Grey (born 1965), American singer
- Paris Hilton (born 1981), socialite and heiress of the Hilton Worldwide multinational hospitality company
- Paris Jackson (born 1998), American actress, activist, and model
- Paris Jones (female singer) (born 1990), American singer and musician known as "PJ"
- Paris Lees (born 1987/1988), British journalist and activist
- Paris Paloma (born 1999), English singer-songwriter and guitarist
- Paris Smith (born 2000), American actress and singer
- Paris Stephens (born 1998), Australian pair skater
- Paris Wells, Australian singer-songwriter

=== Men ===
- Hotman Paris Hutapea (born 1959), Indonesian lawyer
- Jacques Pâris de Bollardière (1907–1986), French Army general and activist
- Paris (actor under Domitian), 1st century actor in Rome
- Paris, alias of Nicolas Hubert (died 1569) French servant of Mary, Queen of Scots
- Paris Barclay (born 1956), American television director
- Paris Bordone (1500–1571), Italian painter
- Paris Cotton (born 1989), American football player
- Paris Davis (born 1939), United States Army officer
- Paris C. Dunning (1806–1884), American politician
- Paris Elia (born 1972), Cypriot footballer
- Paris Ford (born 1998), American football player
- Paris Gee (born 1994), Canadian soccer player
- Paris Gibson (1830–1920), American entrepreneur and politician
- Paris Intarakomalyasut (born 1998), Thai actor and singer
- Paris Jackson (Canadian football) (born 1980), Canadian football player
- Paris Johnson Jr. (born 2001), American football player
- Paris Jones (male singer) (born 1990), American singer
- Paris Kanellakis (1953–1995), Greek computer scientist
- Paris Latsis (born 1979), Greek shipping heir
- Paris Lee (born 1995), American basketball player
- Paris Lenon (born 1977), American football player
- Paris Nakajima-Farran (born 1989), Canadian soccer player
- Paris Sadonis (born 1972), American musician
- Paris Shand (born 2001), American football player
- Paris Simmons (born 1990), English football player
- Paris Singer (1867–1932), French-born American businessman
- Paris Themmen (born 1959), American actor
- Saint Paris (died 346), Bishop of Teano
- Peiras "Paris" Fotis-Zoubris, of the music duo Paris & Simo

== Fictional characters ==
- Count Paris, in William Shakespeare's play Romeo and Juliet
- The Great Paris, stage name of a character on the television series Mission: Impossible
- Paris (Marvel Comics), a member of the Pantheon in Marvel Comics
- Paris, a Parasaurolophus in Dinosaur King
- Paris Carver, a character in the James Bond film Tomorrow Never Dies
- Paris Geller, a character played on the television series Gilmore Girls
- Paris Bennett, original real name of the Marvel Comics character Exodus
- Paris Burnett, a character played on the television soap opera Home and Away

== See also ==
- Paris (mythology), a Trojan character in Greek mythology, most notably The Iliad
- Paris (surname)
- Parys (name), given name and surname
