= Hyleeta Liburd =

Deputy Governor-General for Nevis

Her Honour Hyleeta Liburd OBE MH

Deputy Governor-General for Nevis
- Incumbent
- Assumed office 1 September 2018
- Monarchs: Elizabeth II; Charles III
- Governors-General: Tapley Seaton; Marcella Liburd
- Premier: Mark Brantley
- Preceded by: Marjorie Morton

Hyleeta Liburd OBE MH (also spelt Hyleta Liburd) is a Nevisian public servant who is the current Deputy Governor-General for Nevis, having served in the role since September 2018.

== Career in education ==
Prior to becoming Deputy Governor-General, Liburd had worked in education for thirty nine years in various different roles, including as a classroom teacher, principal education officer, education officer, and a headteacher. In 2014, she was awarded a Nevis Island Administration Independence Award for her contributions to education.

== Deputy Governor-General for Nevis ==
In August 2018, Liburd was announced as the new Deputy Governor-General for Nevis, being sworn in on 31 August 2018 and taking office on 1 September 2018, succeeding acting Deputy Governor-General Marjorie Morton. Liburd is the second woman to hold the position, with her predecessor, Morton being the first woman to ever assume the duties of Deputy Governor-General (in an acting capacity). In the 2020 New Year Honours, Liburd was awarded an OBE for public service.

== Awards ==
- Saint Kitts and Nevis Medal of Honour, 2005
- Nevis Island Administration Independence Award, 2014
- Officer of the Most Excellent Order of the British Empire (OBE), 2020
