= Marjorie Morton =

Deputy Governor-General for Nevis

Marjorie Morton MBE CSM

Deputy Governor-General for Nevis
- Acting; 1 September 2017 – 31 August 2018
- Monarch: Elizabeth II
- Governor-General: Tapley Seaton
- Premier: Vance Amory; Mark Brantley
- Preceded by: Eustace John
- Succeeded by: Hyleeta Liburd

President of the Nevis Island Assembly
- In office 1996–2011
- Preceded by: Spencer Byron
- Succeeded by: Christine Springette

Marjorie Morton MBE CSM is a Nevisian public servant who formerly served as the acting Deputy Governor-General for Nevis from 2017 to 2018, and was the President of the Nevis Island Assembly from 1996 to 2011.

== Early life and career ==
Morton was born and grew up in Nevis, and attended schools in Charlestown. She then went on to have a career in education and the civil service, with 28 years served in both sectors by the time of her retirement in 1994.

== Political career ==
In 1996, Morton was elected as President of the Nevis Island Assembly, serving until 2011. On 1 September 2017, Morton was sworn in as acting Deputy Governor-General for Nevis, becoming the first woman to ever hold the position. She left office on 31 August 2018, being succeeded by Hyleeta Liburd.

== Personal life ==
In 1997, Morton's husband died. She has three children.

Morton is an Anglican and holds a diploma in theology.

== Awards ==
- Award of Companion of the Star of Merit (CSM), 2015
- Member of the Most Excellent Order of the British Empire (MBE), 2022
