= John Daggett (1805–1885) =

American lawyer, historian, and legislator (1805–1885)

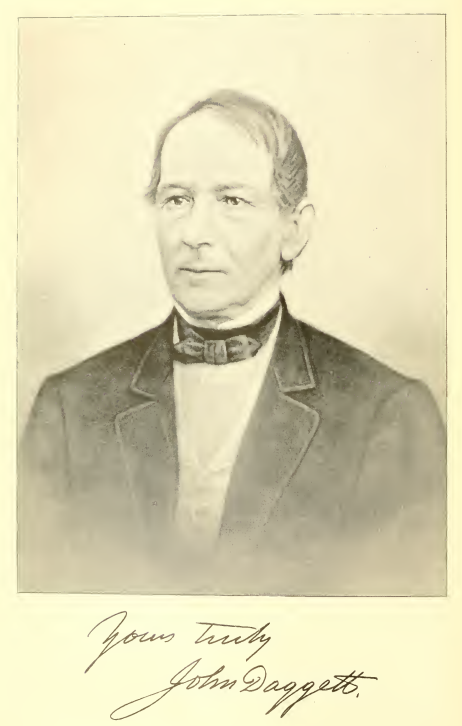
- Daggett ca. 1855
- Born: February 10, 1805; Attleboro, Massachusetts, U.S.
- Died: December 13, 1885; Attleboro, Massachusetts, U.S.
- Education: Brown University (A.B., 1826)
- Occupations: Lawyer, historian, legislator
- Known for: A Sketch of the History of Attleborough (1834); President of the Old Colony Historical Society
- Spouse: Nancy McClellan Boomer (m. 1840)
- Children: 7

John Daggett (February 10, 1805 – December 13, 1885) was an American lawyer, historian, legislator, editor, and civic leader from Attleboro, Massachusetts. He authored A Sketch of the History of Attleborough (1834), the town’s first formal history, and served in both houses of the Massachusetts General Court. He also held the office of Register of Probate and Insolvency for Bristol County, Massachusetts and served fifteen years on the Attleborough school committee.

== Early life ==
Daggett was born in Attleborough, Massachusetts, the son of Ebenezer Daggett and Sally Maxcy Daggett. One of nine children, Daggett grew up on the family homestead on East Bay Road, a property purchased by his great‑grandfather in 1711. As a child he was quiet, reserved, and studious, with an unusually strong memory. At age three or four he memorized an entire tract on the immorality of profanity after hearing it read repeatedly. At a spelling match in Attleborough's New Boston Schoolhouse, he spelled seven hundred words without error.

At fourteen he suffered a severe illness that resulted in the amputation of one leg. The operation was performed without anesthesia, as ether and chloroform were not yet in use. The loss of his leg was said to be "a blessing in disguise, since it settled that he should attend college and devote his life to intellectual pursuits for which he was naturally fitted."

== Education ==
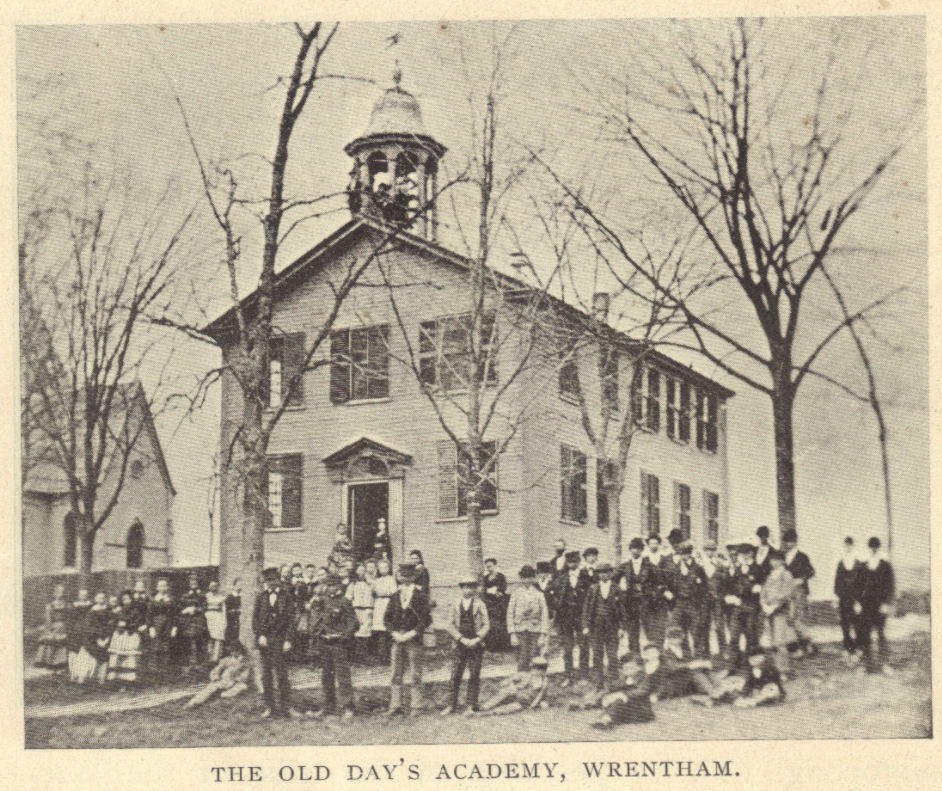
Day's Academy, Wrentham

Daggett attended the New Boston district school and later a classical school in South Attleborough. He prepared for college at Day’s Academy in Wrentham, Massachusetts, and studied under Rev. Alvan Cobb of Taunton, Massachusetts.

He entered Brown University in September 1822 and graduated with high honors in 1826. He attended every Brown commencement from 1826 until his death in 1885—sixty‑four in total.

== Career ==
=== Legal ===
Daggett studied law with Joseph L. Tillinghast of Providence, Rhode Island, a member of Congress; with Josiah Jones Fiske of Wrentham; and attended lectures by Judge Theron Metcalf of Dedham. He was admitted to the bar in Dedham in December 1829 and opened a law office in East Attleborough in January 1830.

He practiced law in Attleborough for his entire life, except for 1833–34, when he served as editor of the Dedham Patriot, a weekly newspaper. As an attorney, he was known for careful research, especially in land titles and probate matters.

=== Political ===
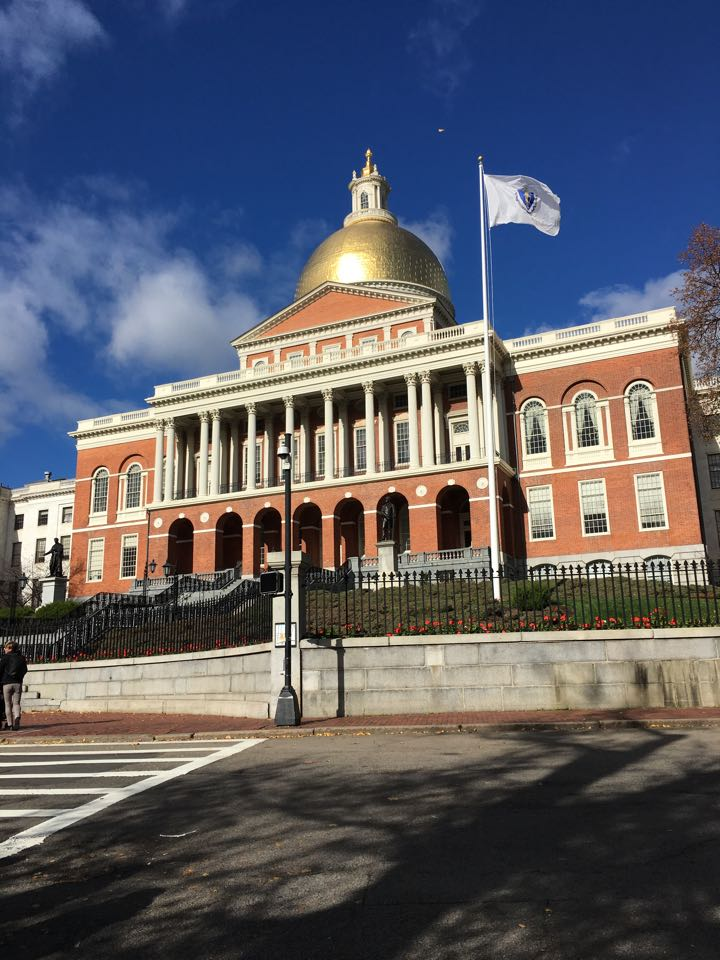
General Court in Boston, seat of the legislature since 1798

Daggett was elected to the Massachusetts House of Representatives from 1836 to 1840 and again in 1866. His first term began when he was only thirty-one years old. He served on the judiciary committee in 1837 and chaired the committee on railways in 1839.

He strongly opposed routing the Boston and Providence Railroad through the center of East Attleborough, arguing that it would disturb graves and endanger residents. His proposed alternative route was rejected, but later acknowledged by the railroad company to have been the better choice.

Daggett served in the Massachusetts Senate in 1850, representing the Bristol District, and was appointed a member of the state Valuation Board for property taxes.

In 1853 Governor John H. Clifford appointed him Register of Probate and Insolvency for Bristol County. He held the office for eleven years, commuting daily to Taunton, Massachusetts and earning a reputation for punctuality and accuracy.

=== Educational ===
Daggett served on the Attleborough school committee for fifteen years, most of that time as chairman. He worked to improve common‑school education during the period when Horace Mann was transforming Massachusetts public schools.

=== Historical and literary ===
Daggett published a volume in 1828 titled Remains of Samuel Bartlett Parris, M.D., which contained a memoir and selections from Parris's writings.

In 1830 he delivered a lecture before the Attleborough Lyceum—a public educational and cultural organization—on the early history of the town. Four years later he published A Sketch of the History of Attleborough in 1834, the town’s first formal history. After his death, his daughter Amelia Maxcy (Daggett) Sheffield edited and issued an expanded edition of Sketch of the History of Attleborough using his notes, correspondence, and additional research.

He served as president of the Old Colony Historical Society for nearly thirty years and was a member of the New England Historic Genealogical Society for more than twenty-five years.

== Personal life ==
Daggett married Nancy McClellan Boomer of Sutton, Massachusetts on June 18, 1840. John Daggett died in Attleborough on December 13, 1885, and was buried in the Old Kirk Yard.

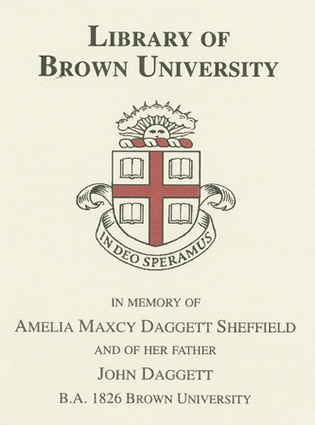
Bookplate for books purchased through the fund.

They had seven children, all born in Attleborough, but only two of them survived to adulthood. Their son John Mayhew Daggett graduated from Brown in 1868, moved to Marianna, Arkansas, around 1872, and worked there as a lawyer, postmaster, real‑estate and loan agent, and deputy county clerk. Their daughter Amelia Maxcy Daggett married George St. John Sheffield in New York City. She was a published genealogist and historian, editor, and philanthropist who established the Amelia Maxcy Daggett Sheffield Fund at Brown University in memory of her father.

== Legacy ==
Daggett’s A Sketch of the History of Attleborough remains a standard reference for historians and genealogists. His nearly thirty‑year presidency of the Old Colony Historical Society shaped the development of one of the oldest historical organizations in the United States.

== See also ==
- History of Attleboro, Massachusetts
- Old Colony Historical Society
- Brown University
- Massachusetts General Court
- Bristol County, Massachusetts

== Sources ==
- Daggett Sheffield, Mary (1894). A Sketch of the History of Attleborough, from Its Settlement to the Division (PDF). Boston: Press of Samuel Usher.
- Memorial Biographies of the New England Historic Genealogical Society. Vol. 8. Boston: New England Historic Genealogical Society. 1907.
- Lineage Book of the National Society of the Daughters of Founders and Patriots of America. National Society of the Daughters of Founders and Patriots of America. 1924. pp. 124–125.
- Doggett, Samuel Bradlee (1894). A History of the Doggett–Daggett Family. Boston: Press of Rockwell and Churchill.
- Finley, E. C. (1932). "Daggett and Allied Families". Americana (American Historical Magazine). Vol. XXVI. New York: American Historical Society, Inc. pp. 85–100.
- A Catalogue of the Portraits and Other Objects of Historic Value Belonging to the Old Colony Historical Society (PDF). Taunton, Mass.: Old Colony Historical Society. 1907.
- "Amelia Maxcy Daggett Sheffield Fund". Brown University Library. Brown University.
- Sheffield, Amelia Maxcy Daggett; Finley, E. C.; American Historical Society (1932). Sheffield, Daggett and allied families: a genealogical study with biographical notes. Genealogy & local history; G2431. New York: American Historical Co. OCLC 16742232.
- Parris, Samuel Bartlett (1829). Daggett, John (ed.). Remains of Samuel Bartlett Parris, M.D.: comprising miscellaneous poems and essays, selected from his manuscripts; with a biographical sketch of the author (PDF). Plymouth, Massachusetts: Ezra Collier.
