= Parish (surname) =

Parish as a surname may refer to:

- Amy Parish (fl. 1980s–2020s), American primatologist and anthropologist
- Billy Parish (born 1981), American clean energy activist and entrepreneur
- Derek Parish (born 1999), American football player
- Diane Parish (born 1969), British actress
- Don Parish (American football) (1948–2018), an American football linebacker
- Don Parish (rugby league) (born 1937), Australian rugby league footballer and coach
- Herman Parish (born 1950s), American author
- John Parish (born 1959), British musician
- John K. Parish (1848–1932), American politician and jurist
- Matthew Parish (born 1975), English lawyer
- Mitchell Parish (1900–1993), American lyricist
- Neil Parish (born 1956), British politician and farmer
- Peggy Parish (1927–1988), American writer
- Robert Parish (born 1953), American basketball player
- Sam Parish (born 1937), the eighth Chief Master Sergeant of the Air Force
- Samuel Bonsall Parish (1838–1928), American botanist
- Sarah Parish (born 1968), English actress

== See also ==
- Parish Crooks (use as a given name)
- Parrish (surname)
- Parris (surname)
