= Eustace John =

Former Deputy Governor-General for Nevis

His Honour Eustace John CMG

Deputy Governor-General for Nevis
- In office 1994–2017
- Monarch: Elizabeth II
- Preceded by: Weston Parris
- Succeeded by: Marjorie Morton

Eustace Llewellyn John CMG (1939 – 27 July 2017) was a Nevisian public servant who was the Deputy Governor-General for Nevis from 1994 to 2017. John had a varied career working as a teacher, customs officer, welfare officer, post officer officer and as a commercial manager in broadcasting. He was appointed accountant general of the nation in 1981 and served until he became deputy governor.

== Career ==
Eustace John was born in Saint George Gingerland Parish on Nevis in 1939. He attended the Gingerland Boys School and the Charlestown Secondary School and went on to achieve a bachelor of science degreee in business studies from the University of the West Indies.

John was a teacher at his former secondary school and a customs officer from 1957 to 1960. In the 1960s, he worked in a number of positions in Saint Kitts-Nevis-Anguilla, first (between 1960 and 1962) as a Social Welfare Officer for Saint Kitts and Nevis, then Chief Revenue Officer of Anguilla (from 1962 to 1963), then returning to Saint Kitts to work in the Customs and Excise Department as an examination officer until 1966. He served with the General Post Office from 1966 to 1969, becoming officer in charge of the parcel post. From 1969 to 1971 he served in the national Premier's Ministry as an administrative assistant.

From 1971 to 1972, he was the Commercial and Accounts Manager at ZIZ Broadcasting Corporation (ZBC) in St. Kitts and the General Manager from 1972 to 1981. From 1981 to 1994, he was the Accountant General of Saint Kitts and Nevis.

=== Deputy Governor-General for Nevis ===
In 1994, he became the second Deputy Governor-General for Nevis, succeeding Weston Parris, who served from 1983 until his death in 1992. In 1996, John received the Order of St Michael and St George (CMG). In 2004 he delivered the speech from the throne as Governor General Sir Cuthbert Montraville Sebastian was ill.

In late April 2017, John stepped down as deputy governor-general. Marjorie Morton succeeded John as the deputy governor-general in September 2017.

== Personal life ==
John was married and had children, and was an Anglican lay reader. He was also secretary of the Nevis Cricket Team from 1961 to 1962 and their manager in 1962; he managed the Santos Football Team from 1971 to 1972. John was a supporter of The Scout Association of Saint Kitts and Nevis and sat on several of their disciplinary committees.

On 27 July 2017, John died at the JN France Hospital, aged 78. The production studio at the ZIZ Broadcasting Corporation is named in his honour.

Preceded by Weston Parris	Deputy Governor-General for Nevis; 1994–2017	Succeeded by Marjorie Morton
