= Deputy Governor-General for Nevis =

- Seal of the Nevis Island Administration
- Incumbent; Hyleeta Liburd since 1 September 2018
- Style: Her Honour
- Residence: Government House, Charlestown
- Appointer: Governor-General of Saint Kitts and Nevis on the advice of the Premier of Nevis
- Term length: At His Majesty's pleasure
- Constituting instrument: Constitution of Saint Kitts and Nevis
- Formation: 19 September 1983; 42 years ago
- First holder: Weston Parris
- Website: nia.gov.kn/ministries/deputy-governor-general/

The deputy governor-general for Nevis is the representative of the monarch of Saint Kitts and Nevis, currently King Charles III, on the island of Nevis. The role is appointed by the governor-general of Saint Kitts and Nevis to act on their behalf in Nevis. The current deputy governor-general for Nevis is Hyleeta Liburd.

The office and residence of the deputy governor-general for Nevis is Government House in Charlestown, Nevis.

The role is not to be confused with the "governor-general's deputy", which is a temporary position that assumes the duties of the governor-general when they are away from the federation or incapacitated.

== Establishment ==
In the early 1980s, the People's Action Movement and Nevis Reformation Party (NRP) government started the process of gaining independence from the United Kingdom and drafting a constitution for Saint Kitts and Nevis that would come into effect upon becoming independent. During this process, the NRP successfully negotiated for significant powers for Nevis to be enshrined in the constitution, including an autonomous island government and assembly for Nevis that would assume office following independence, as well as an additional federal parliamentary seat for Nevis in the National Assembly of Saint Kitts and Nevis. The new constitution for Saint Kitts and Nevis also granted Nevis its own Deputy Governor-General.

On 19 September 1983, the day of independence for Saint Kitts and Nevis, the first deputy governor-general for Nevis, Weston Parris, was sworn in.

== Constitutional basis ==
The position is officially appointed by the governor-general of Saint Kitts and Nevis, but on the advice of the premier of Nevis. The position's duties are set out in Chapter III, Section 23 of the Constitution, which specifies from subsection 2 that:

2. Without prejudice to subsection (1), the Governor-General shall appoint a person in the island of Nevis as Deputy Governor-General to be his deputy in that island and in that capacity to signify on his behalf that he assents or withholds his assent to any bill passed by the Nevis Island Assembly and to perform on his behalf such other functions of the office of Governor-General relating to that island as he may specify.
3. The power and authority of the Governor-General shall not be abridged, altered or in any way affected by the appointment of a deputy under this section and, subject to the provisions of this Constitution and any other law, a deputy shall conform to and observe all instructions that the Governor-General, acting in his own deliberate judgment, may from time to time address to him:
Provided that the question whether or not a deputy has conformed to and observed any such instructions shall not be enquired into by any court of law.
4. Subject to subsection (5), a person appointed under subsection (1) or, as the case may be, subsection(2) shall hold his appointment for such period as may be specified by the Governor-General at the time of his appointment.
5. Any appointment made under subsection (1) or, as the case may be, subsection (2) may be revoked at any time by the Governor-General.
6. The Governor-General shall act-

a) in relation to the making of an appointment under subsection (1) or the revocation of such an appointment, in accordance with the advice of the Prime Minister; and
b) in relation to the making of an appointment under subsection (2) or the revocation of such an appointment, in accordance with the advice of the Premier.

== List of deputy governors-general ==
Following is a list of people who have served as deputy governor-general for Nevis since independence in 1983.

Denotes acting deputy governors-general

No.	Name	Term of office	
No.	Name	Took office	Left office
1	Weston Parris	19 September 1983	5 June 1992
Vacant (5 June 1992 – 15 January 1994)
2	Eustace John	15 January 1994	30 April 2017
Vacant (1 May – 31 August 2017)
–	Marjorie Morton; Acting Deputy Governor-General	1 September 2017	31 August 2018
3	Hyleeta Liburd	1 September 2018	Incumbent
