= Keweenaw Bay Ojibwa Community College =

College

- Type: Public tribal community college
- Established: 1975
- Affiliations: American Indian Higher Education Consortium
- President: Melissa Kiesewetter
- Dean: Megan Haataja
- Location: L’Anse, Michigan, United States; 46.7808°N 88.508°W
- Campus: L'Anse Indian Reservation
- Website: www.kbocc.edu

Keweenaw Bay Ojibwa Community College (KBOCC) is a public tribal community college in L’Anse, Michigan. Chartered by the Keweenaw Bay Indian Community, the college provides postsecondary education to students from the Keweenaw Bay Indian Community and the surrounding region. KBOCC is accredited by the Higher Learning Commission and is designated as a 1994 land-grant institution.

== History ==
Keweenaw Bay Ojibwa Community College was chartered on July 12, 1975 by the Keweenaw Bay Indian Community on July 12, 1975 through Ordinance No. 75-1 as a nonprofit educational corporation. The college was established to provide postsecondary educational opportunities responsive to the needs and interests of American Indian students and the surrounding community.

The college received candidacy status for accreditation from the Higher Learning Commission in October 2009. In December 2010, the U.S. Department of Education approved KBOCC to participate in Title IV federal student financial aid programs. The Bureau of Indian Education also approved the college for funding under the Tribally Controlled Colleges and Universities Assistance Act.

KBOCC received full accreditation from the Higher Learning Commission on June 27, 2013.

In 2014, the college became a signatory to the Michigan Transfer Agreement. The Agricultural Act of 2014 designated KBOCC as a 1994 land-grant institution, allowing the college to participate in federal land-grant programs supporting education, extension, and research.

In November 2017, KBOCC acquired the former Pelkie Elementary School for use as an educational and community facility.

On January 26, 2018, Debra Parrish retired after serving nearly 30 years as president. She was succeeded by Lori Ann Sherman. In 2025, the KBOCC Board of Regents selected Melissa Kiesewetter as the college's next president following a national search. Kiesewetter assumed office on December 8, 2025.

== Academics ==
The college is accredited by the Higher Learning Commission.

The Bureau of Indian Education, Bureau of Indian Affairs, conducted a site visit in April 2010 and recommended the college for approval as a Tribally Controlled Community College/University under the Act. The U.S. Department of Education approved the KBOCC application for Title IV federal student aid programs.

KBOCC is a member of the American Indian Higher Education Consortium (AIHEC), which is a community of tribally and federally chartered institutions. KBOCC was created in response to the higher education needs of American Indians. KBOCC generally serves geographically isolated populations that have no other means accessing education beyond the high school level. The college is also a member of the Michigan Community College Association (MCCA), which represents Michigan's public community colleges.

KBOCC offers associate degree and certificate programs as well as courses for professional development, personal enrichment, and lifelong learning. Its academic offerings include programs in areas such as business, health sciences, environmental science, early childhood education, psychology, Anishinaabe studies, and career and technical education.

The college also maintains transfer relationships with other higher education institutions and participates in the Michigan Transfer Agreement.

== Anishinaabe culture ==
KBOCC was established by the Keweenaw Bay Indian Community with a mission that incorporates Anishinaabe culture, language, values, and lifeways into higher education.

Ojibwa language, history, culture, and traditional knowledge are incorporated into the college's academic and community programming. KBOCC also provides cultural activities and opportunities for students and community members to participate in traditional events and ceremonies.
