= Samuel B. Parris =

American physician and poet (1806–1827)

Samuel Bartlett Parris
- Born: January 30, 1806; Kingston, Massachusetts, U.S.
- Died: September 21, 1827 (aged 21); Attleborough, Massachusetts, U.S.
- Resting place: Evergreen Cemetery, Kingston, Massachusetts; 41.99448°N 70.73174°W
- Education: Brown University (A.B., A.M.); Harvard University (M.D.)
- Occupations: Physician, poet

Samuel Bartlett Parris (January 30, 1806 – September 21, 1827) was an American physician, poet, and diarist from Kingston, Massachusetts. Noted for extraordinary intellectual precocity, he was examined and admitted to Brown University at nine but did not enroll until age eleven, graduating with the Bachelor of Arts in 1821. He earned his Doctor of Medicine at Harvard University in 1825 and practiced briefly in Attleborough, Massachusetts before dying of typhus fever at twenty‑one. His poems, essays, and childhood diary were published posthumously and later cited by historians and anthologists.

== Early life ==
=== Family ===
Parris was the third and youngest son of Rev. Martin Parris, a schoolteacher and Congregational minister, and Julia (Drew) Parris. Martin Parris was hired by the town of Kingston as a schoolmaster in 1794 and later taught in Plymouth. He was ordained in 1817 as minister of the First Congregational Church of Marshfield, Massachusetts, a position he held for about twenty years before retiring to Kingston.

The couple had three sons. The eldest, Martin Luther Parris, born in 1795, became a sea captain and died at sea in 1824. The second, Benjamin Parris, born in 1798, died in childhood in 1805. Samuel Bartlett Parris was born in Kingston on January 30, 1806.

=== Self‑education and diary ===
Parris displayed an unusual aptitude for learning from an early age. He learned the English alphabet by asking family members to name individual letters and committing them to memory, and he acquired penmanship by copying characters from picture books. Before he was eighteen months old he had learned the Hebrew alphabet from his father’s old Hebrew Bible. He soon learned to read with little assistance from his parents.

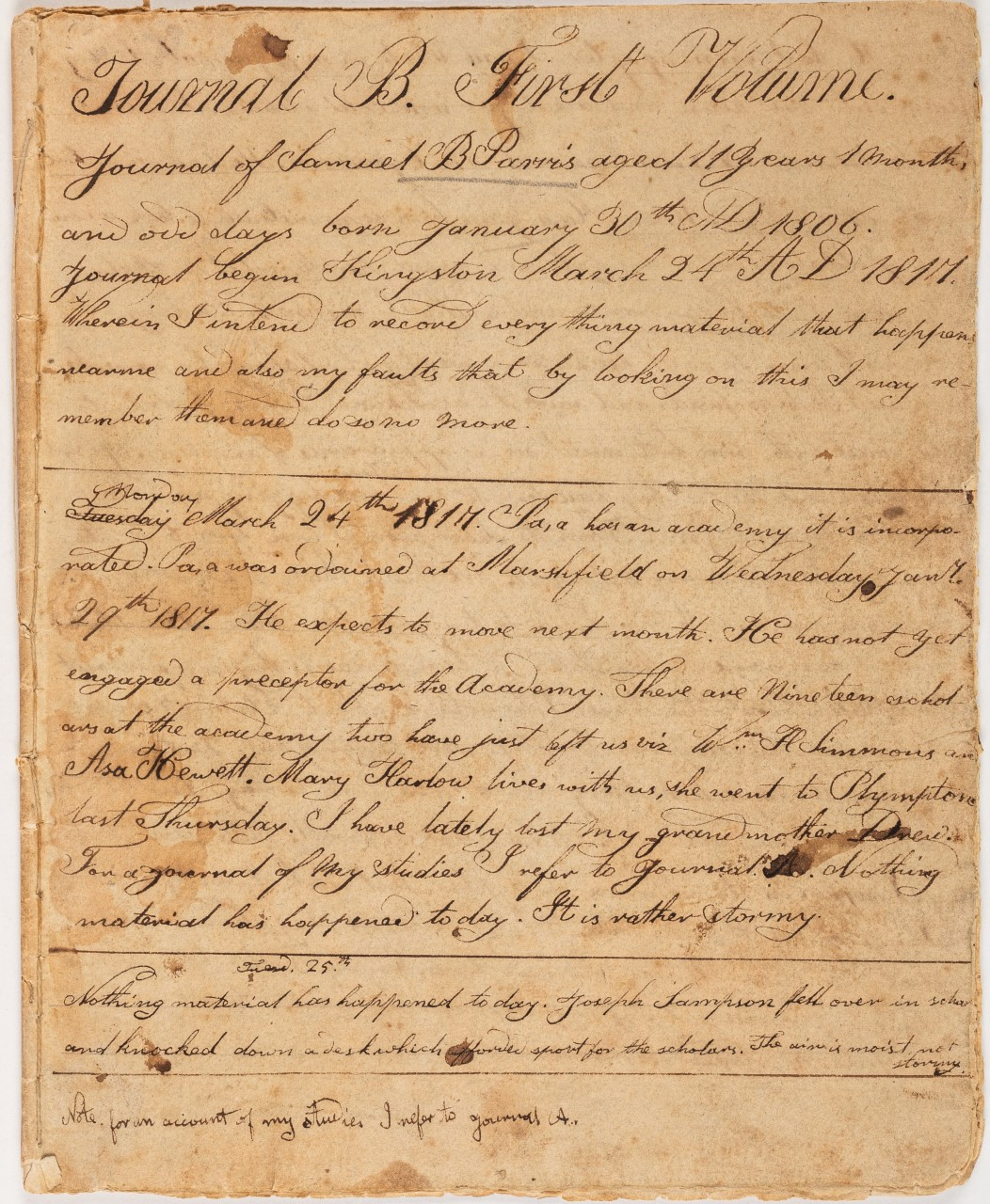
The first page of Parris’s 1817 diary (Volume I)

At about six years of age, Parris began keeping a diary in which he recorded his daily activities, thoughts, and perceived faults, sometimes expressing the latter in Latin. One surviving volume, written in 1817 when he was eleven, records his intention to document events around him. The diary provides an unusually detailed account of his childhood. It describes family life in Kingston, a boarder named Mary Harlow, the family's anticipated move to Marshfield, his home studies, games with friends, and his early interest in the sea. It also records local events, including an "electerizing machine" constructed by Kingston resident Ezekiel Holmes and fires in the neighborhood around harvest time, some of which inspired verses by Parris.

=== Pre-college education ===
Parris received most of his early education at home under the direction of his father, beginning formal study of classical languages at about six years of age. When he was seven, a certificate from the Kingston Grammar School recorded that he correctly spelled 700 words, suggesting that he may have attended the school at some point. By 1817, when Parris was eleven, his father was operating a small academy in the family home with nineteen pupils.

== College education ==
=== Brown University ===
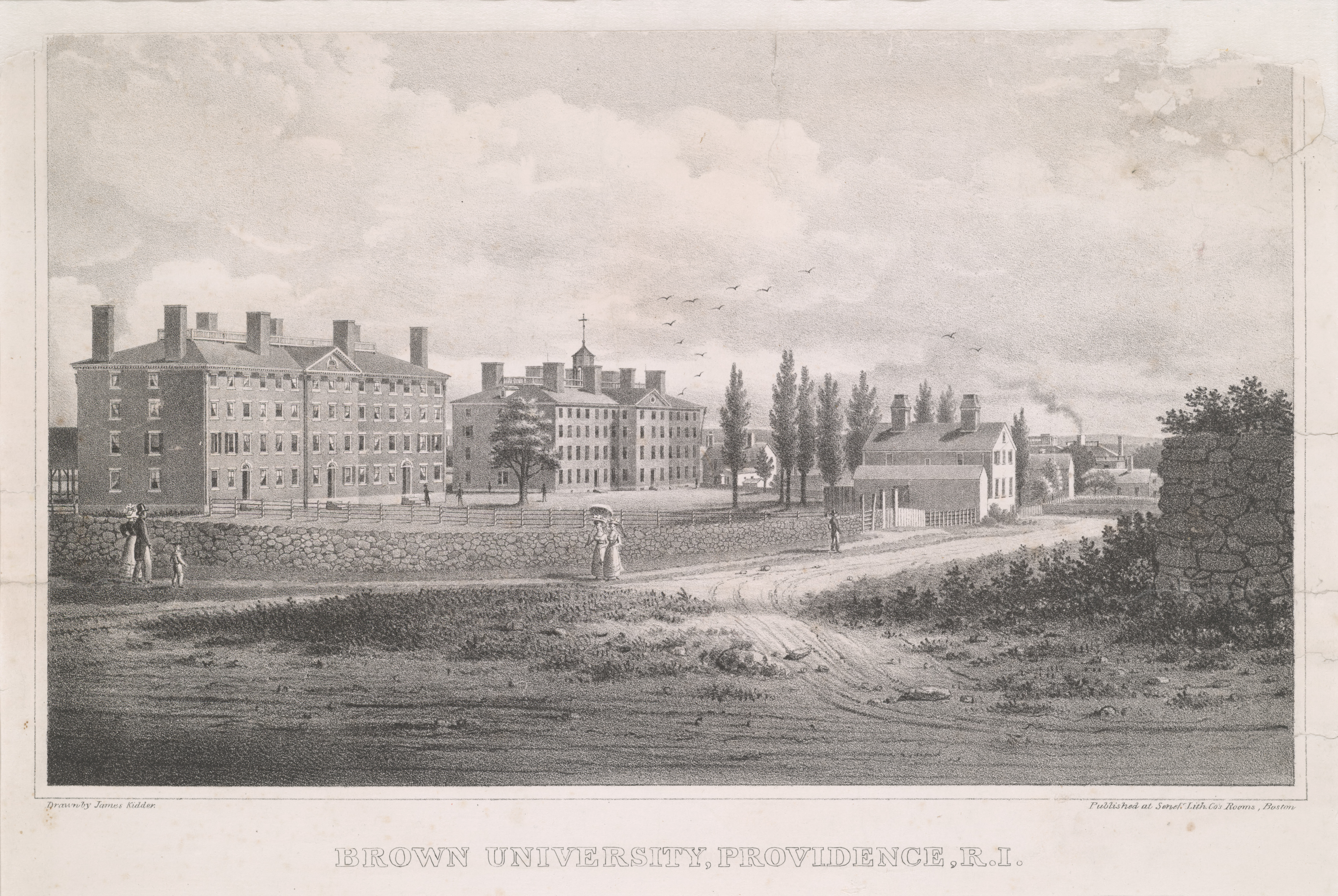
Brown University, ca. 1828

At nine, Parris was examined for admission to Brown University. He passed examinations in Virgil, Cicero, the Greek New Testament, and higher mathematics and was admitted to the university. Because of his age, however, his father kept him at home for another two years before allowing him to enroll.

Parris entered Brown at eleven and graduated with a Bachelor of Arts degree in 1821, at the age of fifteen. He graduated with honors and was selected to deliver the Greek Oration, a prominent part of the commencement ceremony. He subsequently received a Master of Arts degree "in course" (Note: Following the prevailing custom in other universities, Brown conferred the degree of A.M. degree "in course" (without coursework or an examination) three years after the A.B. degree upon the payment of certain fees. This custom was abolished with the class of 1889.) in 1825, the same year he earned his medical degree at Harvard.

=== Massachusetts Medical College, Harvard University ===
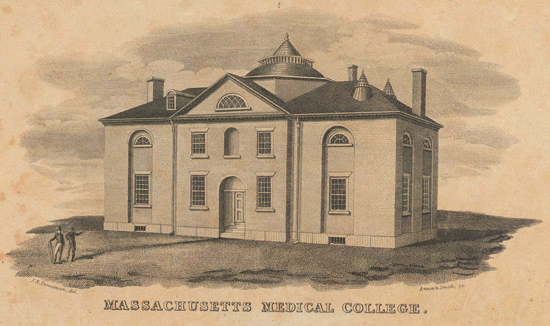
Massachusetts Medical College, ca. 1824

After leaving Brown, Parris remained at home for about a year before beginning medical studies at Harvard University. He attended lectures at the university’s Massachusetts Medical College in Boston from 1822 to 1825. As part of his practical training, he studied under Dr. Paul L. Nichols in Kingston during his first year and under Dr. Samuel Bugbee in Wrentham during his final two years.

Even though Parris was the youngest student at the medical school, in his first year he won the Boylston Medical Prize for an original thesis on the subject of animal heat. The prize was a case of surgical instruments valued at $16 ($455.30 in 2025).

He received his M.D. in 1825 at the age of nineteen. His thesis was on the topic of symptoms.

== Medical career ==
Parris began practicing medicine on October 14, 1825, in Attleborough, Massachusetts, in the village known as Falls. He established his practice at the residence of the late Dr. Thomas Stanley. He remained in practice there until his death less than two years later.

== Death ==
Parris became ill around the beginning of September 1827. His illness was diagnosed as malignant typhus fever. He died in the early morning of September 21, 1827, in Attleborough, at the age of 21.

Shortly before his death, Parris expressed sorrow that his death would leave his parents without children. He was initially buried near his residence in Attleborough and was later reinterred at Evergreen Cemetery in Kingston, Massachusetts.

== Literary work ==
Title page of Remains of Samuel Bartlett Parris, M.D (1829)

Parris wrote poetry and essays throughout his short life, leaving behind a body of manuscripts that was preserved after his death. His surviving writings include poems concerned with nature, science, personal reflection, and events in his community.

In 1829, a 312-page memorial volume of Parris's writings titled Remains of Samuel Bartlett Parris, M.D. was published. The volume contains 110 pages of poetry, 144 pages of prose and verse, and a 46-page biographical memoir by his friend John Daggett of Attleborough.

Also in 1829, Samuel Kettell included Parris’s poem, "On a Sprig of Juniper," in the third volume of Specimens of American Poetry, with Critical and Biographical Notices, a major anthology of American verse. The volume featured leading poets of the early national period, including William Cullen Bryant, Henry Wadsworth Longfellow, Fitz‑Greene Halleck, and John Greenleaf Whittier, placing Parris’s work among the foremost American writers of his generation. Kettell accompanied the poem with a short biographical notice of Parris.

== Legacy ==
Parris was remembered in Kingston long after his death. During the town’s sesquicentennial celebration in 1876, Rev. William A. Drew of Augusta, Maine, described him as "one of Kingston’s most gifted scholars” and quoted from his poem "Anticipations and Recollections.” A 1928 county history likewise listed him among the town’s notable residents and praised him as "one of the most brilliant scholars Kingston ever produced.”

Parris was featured in The Anthony Memorial (1886), John Calvin Stockbridge’s catalogue of the Harris Collection of American Poetry. The entry records his posthumous volume Remains, bequeathed to Brown University by U.S. Senator Henry B. Anthony, and includes a brief biographical sketch.

Parris has also been noted as part of the long tradition of physician‑poets. In 1945, Mary Lou McCarthy McDonough’s anthology Poet Physicians described Parris as an extraordinary prodigy, remarking that “seldom in history has one man packed into a period of less than a quarter of a century the literary and medical attainments which Samuel Bartlett Parris achieved.” In his study Effects of Poetry on Mood States: A Test of the "Isoprinciple” (1975), Keith J. Krueger placed him alongside notable physician-poets such as John Keats, Oliver Wendell Holmes, John McCrae, and William Carlos Williams, underscoring the cultural significance of his dual career.

Parris’s childhood diary has also drawn the attention of modern historians. Jacqueline S. Reinier cited entries from his 1817 and 1818 journals in From Virtue to Character: American Childhood, 1775–1850 (1996), using his writings to illustrate early‑nineteenth‑century ideas about childhood and child‑rearing.

== Sources ==
- Remains of Samuel Bartlett Parris, M.D., Comprising Miscellaneous Poems and Essays, Selected from His Manuscripts; with a Biographical Sketch of the Author (PDF). Biographical sketch by John Daggett. Plymouth, Massachusetts: Ezra Collier. 1829.
- Report of the Proceedings and Exercises at the One Hundred and Fiftieth Anniversary of the Incorporation of the Town of Kingston, Mass., June 27, 1876 (PDF). Boston: E. B. Stillings & Co. 1876. p. 92.
- Stockbridge, John C. (1886). The Anthony Memorial: A Catalogue of the Harris Collection of American Poetry, with Biographical and Bibliographical Notes (PDF). Providence, Rhode Island: Brown University. p. 191.
- "Medical Preceptors To 1899 (search results)". Richard Parker Morgan Databases.
- "Medical Students (search results)". Richard Parker Morgan Databases.
- Parris, Samuel Bartlett (1817). Journal (Manuscript). Worcester, Massachusetts: American Antiquarian Society Library.
- Kettell, Samuel (1829). Specimens of American Poetry, with Critical and Biographical Notices (PDF). Vol. III. Boston: S. G. Goodrich and Co. pp. 365–366.
- Catalogus Senatus Academici Collegii Harvardiani, et Eorum Qui Muneribus et Officiis Praefuerunt, Quique Honoribus Academicis Donati Sunt, in Universitate Quae Est Cantabrigiae in Civitate Massachusettensium (PDF). Cambridge, Massachusetts: Typis Welch, Bigelow, et Sociorum. 1869. pp. 38, 113.
- Catalogue of the Boylston Medical Society of Harvard University, December 1906. Boston: The Merrymount Press. 1907. p. 41.
- Tilson, Mercer V. (1911). The Tilson Genealogy from Edmond Tilson at Plymouth, N.E., 1638 to 1911, with Brief Sketches of the Family in England Back to 1066; Also Brief Account of Waterman, Murdock, Bartlett, Turner, Winslow, Sturtevant, Keith and Parris Families, Allied with the Parents of the Author. Plymouth, Massachusetts: The Memorial Press. pp. 538–539.
- Reinier, Jacqueline S. (1996). From Virtue to Character: American Childhood, 1775–1850. New York: Twayne Publishers. p. 212. ISBN 080574102X.
- Thompson, Elroy Sherman (1928). History of Plymouth, Norfolk and Barnstable Counties, Massachusetts. Vol. 1. New York: Lewis Historical Publishing Company. pp. 588–589.
- Aprill, Susan (2009-11-03). "Martin Parris & the Small-Pox". Pique of the Week, Kingston (Massachusetts) Public Library Local History Collections.
- Annual Circular of the Massachusetts Medical College, with a History of the Medical Department of Harvard University, a Catalogue of Graduates, &c (PDF). Boston: David Clapp. 1846. p. 18.
- Catalogue of the Officers and Students of Brown University, 1884-5. Providence, Rhode Island: Providence Press Company. 1884. p. 81.
- "Samuel Bartlett Parris diary, 1817". American Antiquarian Society.
- "Vertical Files OC2" (PDF). Kingston Public Library. Kingston Public Library Archives.
- Krueger, Keith J. (1975). The Effects of Poetry on Mood States: A Test of the "Isoprinciple" (Thesis). University of Montana.
- McDonough, Mary Lou McCarthy (1945). Poet Physicians: An Anthology of Medical Poetry Written by Physicians. Springfield, Illinois: Thomas. p. 67.
- The Graduate School: Announcement of Courses. Providence, Rhode Island: Brown University. 1928. p. 6.
