= E. C. Parrish =

American politician from California

E. C. Parrish was an American politician. He served as a member of the 1865–1867 California State Assembly, representing the 2nd District.
