= Weston Parris =

Nevisian public servant (died 1992)

Weston Parris MBE

Deputy Governor-General for Nevis
- In office 19 September 1983 – 5 June 1992
- Monarch: Elizabeth II
- Governor-General: Sir Clement Arrindell
- Premier: Simeon Daniel; Vance Amory
- Succeeded by: Eustace John (assumed office in 1994)

Weston Owen Parris MBE (died June 1992, aged 64) was a Nevisian public servant who served as the first Deputy Governor-General for Nevis from his appointment in 1983 until his death.

== Deputy Governor-General for Nevis ==
At the independence ceremony for Saint Kitts and Nevis becoming independent from the United Kingdom on 19 September 1983, Parris was officially appointed as the first Deputy Governor-General for Nevis. He subsequently gave the inaugural throne speech for the new Nevis Island Assembly in October 1983. Parris was formerly a schoolmaster.

== Death ==
On 5 June 1992, Parris was found dead by fishermen in the waters of Gallows Bay, Nevis. He was aged 64.

== Awards ==
- Member of the Most Excellent Order of the British Empire (MBE)

Preceded by N/A - office established	Deputy Governor-General for Nevis; 1983-1992	Succeeded by Eustace John
