= Debra Parrish =

American academic administrator

President of Keweenaw Bay Ojibwa Community College
- Succeeded by: Lori Ann Sherman

Personal details
- Children: 2
- Education: Northern Michigan University (B.A.)
- Occupation: Academic administrator

Debra J. Parrish is an American academic administrator. She was a president of Keweenaw Bay Ojibwa Community College for almost 30 years.

== Education ==
Parrish completed a B.A. from Northern Michigan University.

== Career ==
Parrish began working for the Keweenaw Bay Indian Community (KBIC) in 1972 as a legal secretary for Gar Hood, a tribal attorney. She also assisted Georgianna Emery to create the first National Congress of American Indians meeting at the tribal center. Parrish worked as a secretary and administrative assistant for the Young Adult Community Corp (YAAC) program and the chairman's office. She was an administrative assistant for Don LaPointe. She worked on the Elderly Nutrition Programs with James Schutte and helped set up the Ojibwa Seniors Gift Shop. Parrish was a program coordinator for job training programs and in the business development office. She assisted in the creation of the Ojibwa Lanes and Lounge project with Mike Chosa and Tim Shanahan and in the creation of the Ojibwa Industrial Park. Parrish helped develop the Economic Development Corporation and volunteered during the establishment of KBIC's Big Bucks Bingo in Zeba Bingo Hall. She was an early manager of the Even Start Program where she established the indoor play center that is now part of the Pre-Primary Program. Parrish served on the Keweenaw Bay Tribal Council in 1987 and as the secretary. She participated in committees including hiring, powwow, economic development, education, constitutional task force, health board, and the Ojibwa senior board.

=== Keweenaw Bay Ojibwa Community College ===
Parrish worked at Keweenaw Bay Indian Community (KBIC) for 46 years including nearly 20 years as president of Keweenaw Bay Ojibwa Community College. She reestablished KBOCC as an institution of higher learning. In 1998, Tribal Council granted Parrish permission to reopen KBOCC which was charted in 1975 but closed down in 1980. It first started in a section of the Ojibwa Senior Citizen's center before expanding to its own buildings in Baraga in 2000. After purchasing the former Baraga County Memorial Hospital for $1.00, extensive renovation was done to become the Wabanung Campus, the college's main campus in L'Anse, Michigan. Parrish played a key role in the development of the four year old Little Eagles Center, KBOCC Child Care Center, and the Pelkie Arts and Agricultural Center. Under Parrish's leadership, KBOCC joined the American Indian Higher Education Consortium. At KBOCC, she oversaw the college achieve accreditation. Initiatives she worked with included Indian tuition waivers, and advocating for the continuance of the Title III Higher Education Act. In 2013, KBOCC became fully accredited by the Higher Learning Commission and was granted became a Land-grant university in 2014.

On January 26, 2018, she announced her resignation and retirement from KBOCC. Parrish stated she would still work as a consultant but wanted to take time to "relax and enjoy family." Parrish was succeeded by interim president Cherie Dakota. In August 2018, Lori Ann Sherman became president of KBOCC.

==== Research ====
Parrish received funding from the Economic Research Service to conduct health assessments and a nutrition screening of the Keweenaw Bay Indian Community. This study consisted of nutrition surveys for families with children ages 1 to 4. A major obstacle facing the project included the distribution of surveys because the tribal operations did not have a central mailing list. Her study aimed to document the prevalence of nutrition related diseases in tribal youth, reduce the incidence of chronic diseases, and to create programs to teach Ojibwe culture with the goal of encouraging healthy lifestyles.

== Personal life ==
Parrish has two children, Sharon Geroux of New Mexico and deceased son, Rick Geroux. After his death, a memorial scholarship was established at KBOCC. Parrish has seven grandchildren and cared for twelve foster children.

== See also ==
- List of women presidents or chancellors of co-ed colleges and universities
