= Rudy Parris =

American musician (born 1965)

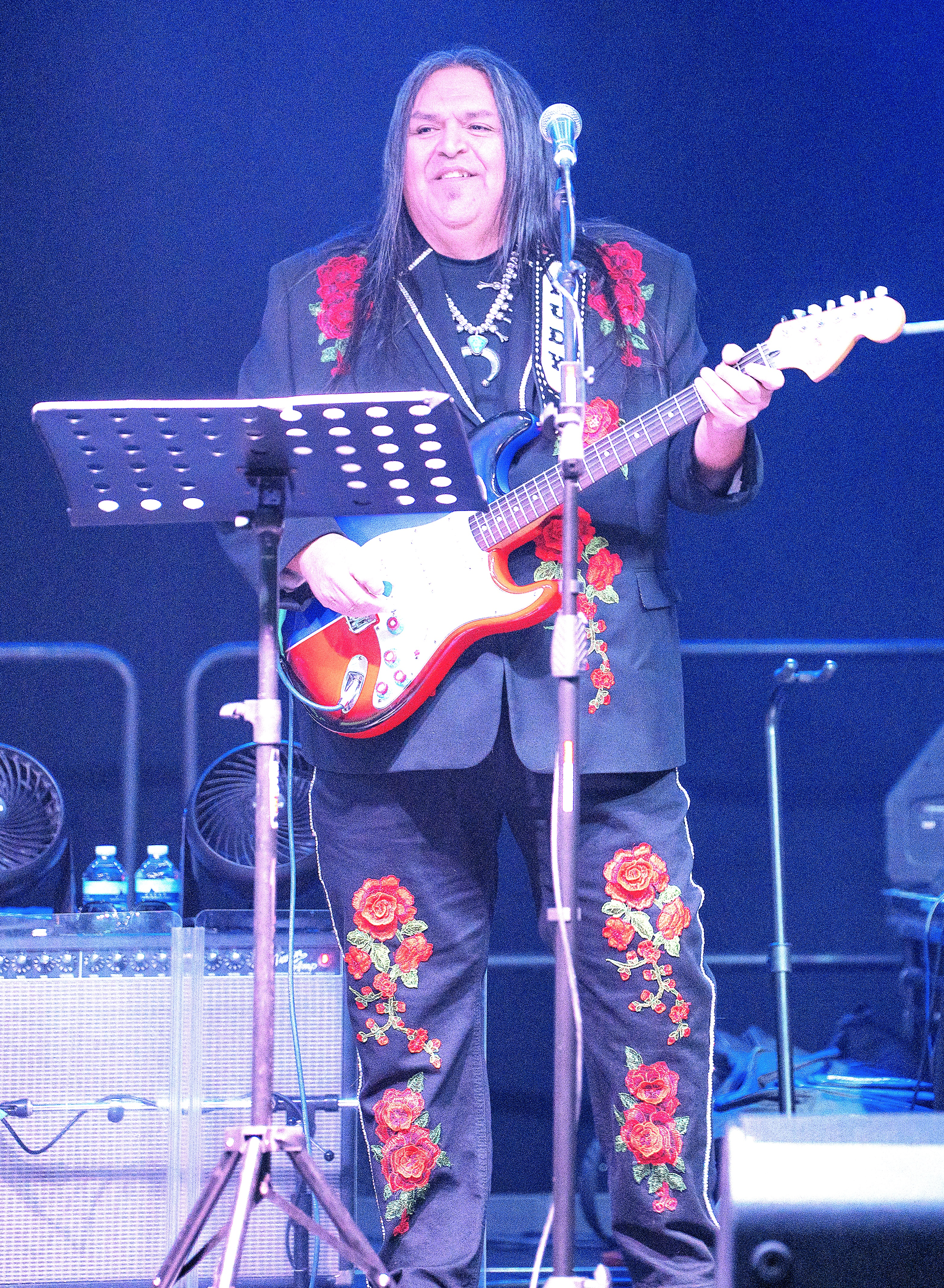
Rudy performing in Nevada

Rudy Parris (born December 16, 1965) is an American singer, songwriter, guitarist, producer, and multi-instrumentalist from California's San Joaquin Valley. He gained national recognition as a contestant on NBC’s The Voice (Season 3) and is known for his work in Country, Blues, Rock, and American roots music, particularly within the Bakersfield sound tradition.

== Early life ==
Parris was born and raised in Visalia California. He began studying violin in elementary school before transitioning to guitar during his middle school years. At 17 years old, he was performing regularly at venues throughout Tulare County and the greater Central San Joaquin Valley.

== Career ==
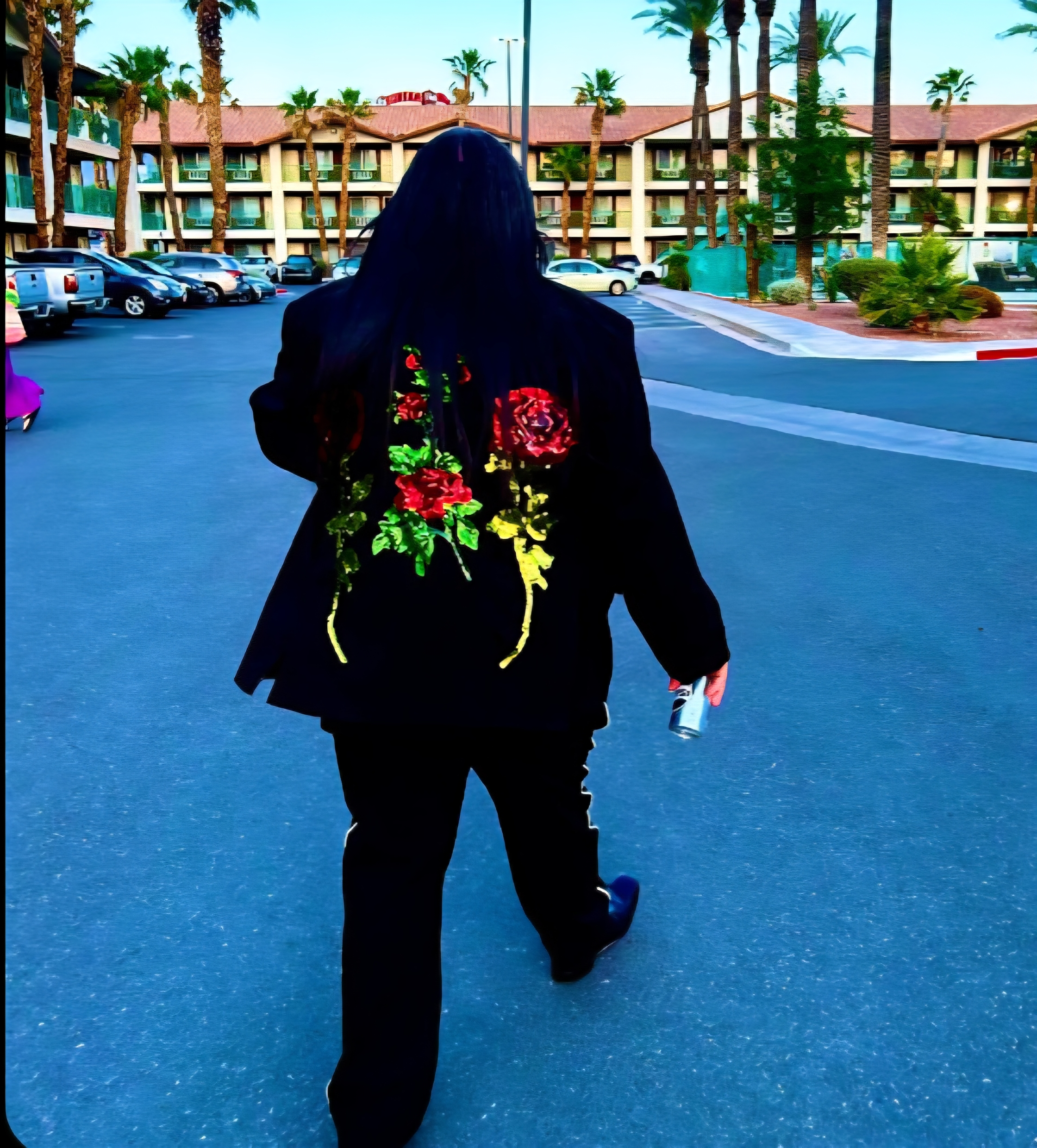
Rudy walking to the stage

=== Early career ===
Parris toured as lead guitarist for Hank Williams III in 2003. He later became a regular performer at Buck Owens’ Crystal Palace in Bakersfield soon after it opened, appearing in multiple shows alongside Owens and participating in several annual Buck Owens Birthday and New Years concerts.

=== The Voice ===
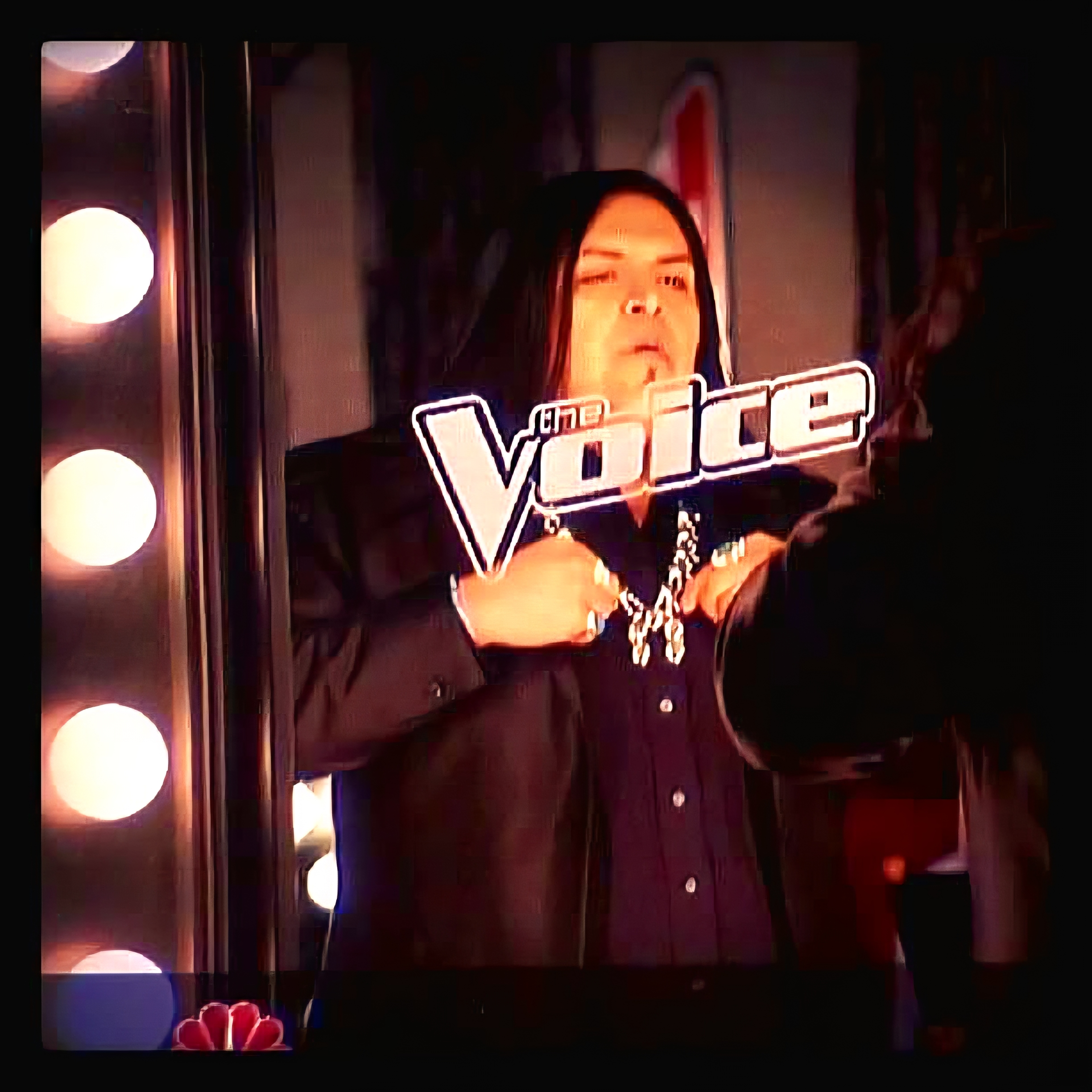
Getting ready for the blind auditions

Parris was a member of Team Blake Shelton on Season 3. Recordings of his performances, including “Bad Day (The Voice Performance)” and “Every Breath You Take (The Voice Performance),” were digitally released in 2012 by Universal Records.

=== Recording and collaborations ===
He later recorded the album Makin’ My Way at Capitol Records’ Studio B in Hollywood where Merle Haggard and Buck Owens recorded. The album featured collaborations with musicians including Pete Anderson, Pat Vegas, Little Joe, Hank Williams III, Chad Smith, Michael Lee Firkins and actor Michael Madsen.

Parris was involved in the blues music scene both with Ron Thompson and as solo artist. Parris performed on the Legendary Rhythm & Blues Cruise, sharing stages with artists such as Bobby “Blue” Bland, Taj Mahal, Pinetop Perkins, Hubert Sumlin, Willie “Big Eyes” Smith, Buckwheat Zydeco, and others. He also opened for or performed alongside blues artists including Tommy Castro, Magic Dick, Deanna Bogart, Ronnie Baker Brooks, Tab Benoit, Guitar Shorty, Candye Kane, Little Charlie & the Nightcats, Chris Cain, Coco Montoya, Buddy Miles, Joe Louis Walker, and Bo Diddley.

=== Later work ===
In 2019, Parris was asked to serve as lead singer for The Buckaroos, the band founded by Buck Owens, with performances scheduled at the Crystal Palace. Engagements planned for 2020 were canceled due to the COVID-19 pandemic.Parris is currently performing a Tribute to Merle Haggard with Merle’s bandleader and steel guitarist, Norm Hamlet. Playing alongside Parris is Skip Edwards, former CMA Pianist of the Year

== Discography ==
List of studio albums, with selected detailsList of studio albums, with selected details
Title	Album details
Makin' My Way	Released: 2016; Label: Warrior Records; Formats: CD, digital download
Title	Album details
Modern Day Cowboy	Released: 1994; Guests: JayDee Maness, Side Page, Pat Coil. Producer Michael Ferenci; Formats: CD

List of singles, with year released and album name
Title	Year	Album
"Every Breath You Take" (The Voice Performance)	2012	Universal Records
"Bad Day" (The Voice Performance)	2012	Universal Records
"Mama Don't Go" (feat. Jennifer Keel)	2024	Bakersfield Believes

== Guest appearances ==
List of guest appearances, with other performing artists, showing year released and album name
Title	Year	Other artist(s)	Album
"NeverEndingTrain"	2008	Co-wrote title track. Sang backup vocals	Big House
"Kern River Blues"	2022	Gregory Porter, Monty Byrom, Amy Adams, Norm Hamlet	Kern River Blues
"Mento Buru"	2001	Guitar and Mixed Album	Mento Buru
"Jennifer Keel"	2025	Norm Hamlet, Susan Raye, Johnny Owens, Monty Byrom	Bakersfield Believes
