= Star of Peru =

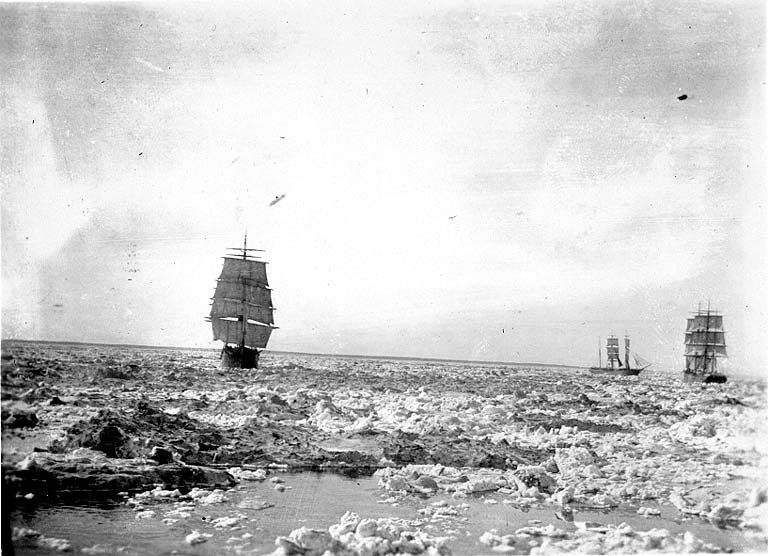
Star of Peru stuck in sea ice in the Bering Sea

The Star of Peru, originally the Himalaya and eventually the Bouganville, was an iron sided sailing vessel. When she was purchased by the Alaska Packing Co., the name changed to Star of Peru and she was overhauled for use in Alaska. She was later sold to French owners and became the Bouganville. The ship is now a wreck site.

== History ==
The Himalaya was built in 1863 by Pile, Hay & Co. in Sunderland, England. She measured 201'2"×33'0"×20'4" and had a tonnage 1008 GRT. She was sold to Shaw, Savill & Co. around 1865 and "employed in the New Zealand emmigrant [sic] trade" according to Wreck Site. From 1865 until 1867 G.D. Tyser of London was the registered owner.

The Himalaya was reduced to a barque in 1880. By 1891 she was sold to Alaska Packers Co. and renamed the Star of Peru. In 1912 the Alaska Packers Association fleet log book listed the Alitak, Bohemia, Centennial, Chilrak, Indiana, Jennie, Kvichak, Kadiak, L. J. Morse, Mertha Nelson, Nushagak, Premier, Prosfer, Santa Clara, Star of Alaska, Star of Chile, Star of England, Star of Finland, Star of France, Star of Greenland, Star of Holland, Star of Iceland, Star of India, Star of Italy, Star of Peru, Star of Russia, Star of Scotland, Star of Zealand, Tacoma, and Unimak. The entry includes the names of the ships' captains in the upper left-hand corner and handwritten entries for vessel location by date, plus notes on cargo, crew, arrivals and departures.

She was sold to French owners Burns Philp & Co., a company established to service French interests between Noumea and Indochina, and renamed Bouganville. She sailed in 1926 and to the New Hebrides, where she became a copra storing hulk and "rode out World War II" according to Wreck Site. She was afloat at least until 1948.
