= Maud Parrish =

American travel writer (born 1878)

Maud Parrish (1878–1976?) was an American traveller who claimed to have travelled around the world 16 times. She recorded her experiences in Nine Pounds of Luggage, first published in 1939.

== Early life ==
Parrish was born in San Francisco in 1878, the only child of parents who brought her up to be a lady who would have a respectable marriage. However, she wanted more than that, having from a young age the urge to explore the world, perhaps inherited from her father who had trekked across America by caravan to California's first gold rush. She married a man from a family that had business interests in South America, hoping that he would take her there but he refused to do so. After having been refused a dissolution of the marriage in a court case that turned to violence, she left San Francisco without telling her parents or her husband, buying a passage to Nome, Alaska before making her way to the gold rush area of the Yukon, travelling on horseback, and by river boat and dog team. She took just one suitcase and her banjo, and her ability to play this, the piano and three other instruments enabled her to support herself in Dawson City, together with fees paid by miners to dance with her in dance halls. After she had earned enough money, she bought a ticket to go down the Yukon River, and so began her itinerant life style. She did, however, manage to return home on several occasions to see her parents.

== Travels ==
After leaving Dawson City, she met four miners who had decided to prospect for gold in Patagonia in the southern end of South America, and invited her to go with them. She travelled with them via San Francisco, to see her parents. Her subsequent travels included most of the world apart from central and southern Africa and Afghanistan. Some of the places she visited were the Falkland Islands, Inner Mongolia, Hong Kong, along the Burma Road, Iran, Iceland, Montenegro, the Solomon Islands, the Gilbert Islands (now Kiribati), Tahiti, the Galapagos Islands, Bali, French Guiana and Senegal. In Shanghai she met many people at the Astor House Hotel who proved useful in assisting her onward travels. In 1936, she attended the Berlin Olympics.

In the mid-1930s she was persuaded to write her story, which she did with the assistance of letters she had written to friends. Her journey home from Borneo, where she was when the book was printed, was paid for by her publisher so that she could publicise the book.

== Publications ==
- Nine Pounds of Luggage (journeys across the globe). J. B. Lippincott Co. January 1939. 400 pages available for checkout on Internet Archive
- Excerpts in The Virago Book of Women Travellers. 1994 edition available for checkout on Internet Archive, page 173

== Death ==
Parrish is believed to have died at the age of 98, although no records of this have been identified.
