= Paul Parrish =

American singer, songwriter and pianist

- Genres: Folk, pop, psychedelic pop
- Occupations: Singer, songwriter, pianist
- Instruments: Piano, organ
- Years active: 1967–present

Paul Parrish is an American singer, songwriter and pianist. His songs have been recorded by Helen Reddy, Kenny Rogers, The Dillards, Robin Dransfield, and others. Jon Pruett of Allmusic called his first album, The Forest of My Mind, "a bright, excellently produced LP filled with remarkable sunshine-dipped folk-pop songs."

Parrish wrote the song A Poem I Wrote for Your Hair for the 1970 film "Fools" starring Jason Robards and Katharine Ross.

With Lorenzo Toppano, Parrish was half of the duo Parrish & Toppano. They recorded two albums together and got quite famous in Europe, mostly Germany.

Parrish’s classic song “That’s The Way of Friends” from his 1979 album Song for a Young Girl gained popularity in the Philippine airwaves.

== Discography ==
- The Forest of My Mind (Music Factory, 1968 • Reissued on CD by Now Sounds, 2014)
- Songs (1971, Warner Bros., WS 1930)
- Song for a Young Girl – Produced By Louie Shelton (1979, ABC AA-1031)
- The Royal Falcon (White Records, 1987 with Lorenzo Toppano)
- The Shores of This Great Ocean (White Records, 1988 with Lorenzo Toppano)
