= Van Parys =

Van Parys is a surname. Notable people with the surname include:

- Annelies Van Parys (born 1975), Belgian composer
- Georges Van Parys (1902–1971), French composer
- Germaine Van Parys (1893–1983), Belgian photojournalist
- Tony Van Parys (born 1951), Belgian politician
