= Paris (surname) =

Paris is a surname. Notable people with the surname include:

- Aimé Paris (1798–1866), French music educator and stenographer
- Ashley Paris (born 1987), Women's National Basketball Association player
- Barry Paris (born 1948), American author
- Blanca París de Oddone (1925–2008), Uruguayan historian
- Bubba Paris (born 1960), American football player
- Cécile Paris, French and Australian computer scientist
- Courtney Paris (born 1987), Women's National Basketball Association player
- Delbert Paris, Dominican politician
- Dominik Paris (born 1989), Italian ski racer
- Drew Paris (born 1988), Canadian ice hockey player
- Elizabeth Crewson Paris (born 1958), United States Tax Court judge
- Enrique Paris (born 1948), Chilean physician and politician
- François-Edmond Pâris (1806–1893), French admiral
- Gaston Paris (1839–1903), French writer and linguist
- Gaston Paris (photographer) (1903–1964), French photographer
- Giuseppe Paris (1895–1968), Italian gymnast
- Helga Paris (1938–2024) German photographer
- Hotman Paris Hutapea (born 1959), Indonesian lawyer
- Ian Castaldi Paris, Maltese politician
- Jackie Paris (1926–2004), American jazz singer and guitarist
- Jasmin Paris (born 1983), British ultramarathon runner, daughter of the mathematician Jeff Paris
- Jeff Paris (mathematician) (born 1944), British mathematician, father of Jasmin Paris
- Jeff Paris (musician), American vocalist, keyboardist and guitarist
- Jerry Paris (1925–1986), American actor and Director
- Joel Paris (born 1993), Australian cricket
- John Paris, Jr. (b. 1946), Canadian hockey coach
- John Ayrton Paris (1785–1856), physician
- Kelly Paris (1957–2019), American basketball player
- Kyren Paris (born 2001), American baseball player
- Lucius Domitius Paris (died 67 AD), actor in Rome under the emperor Nero
- Maria Antonia Paris (1813–1885), Catholic nun
- Marie-Louise Paris (1889–1969), French engineer, founder of l'Institut électro-mécanique féminin.
- Matthew Paris (1200–1259), English monk and historian
- Nilsa Paris (born 1958), Puerto Rican sprinter
- Percy Paris, Canadian politician
- Pierre-Adrien Pâris (1745–1819), French architect
- Richard Bruce Paris (1946–2022), British mathematician
- Ronald Paris (1933–2021), German painter and graphic artist
- Ryan Paris (born 1953), Italian singer
- Samuel Parris (1653–1720), minister at Salem, Massachusetts during the Salem witch trials
- Sarina Paris (born 1973), Canadian pop vocalist
- Taylor Paris (born 1992), Canadian rugby player
- Twila Paris (born 1958), female Christian singer
- Wilbur de Paris (1900–1973), American jazz trombonist
- William de Paris (fl. 1303–1327), English Member of Parliament

== Fictional characters ==
- Owen Paris, on the television series Star Trek: Voyager, father of Tom Paris
- Tom Paris, on the television series Star Trek: Voyager

== See also ==
- Parys (name), given name and surname
