= Charles J. Girard =

United States Army general

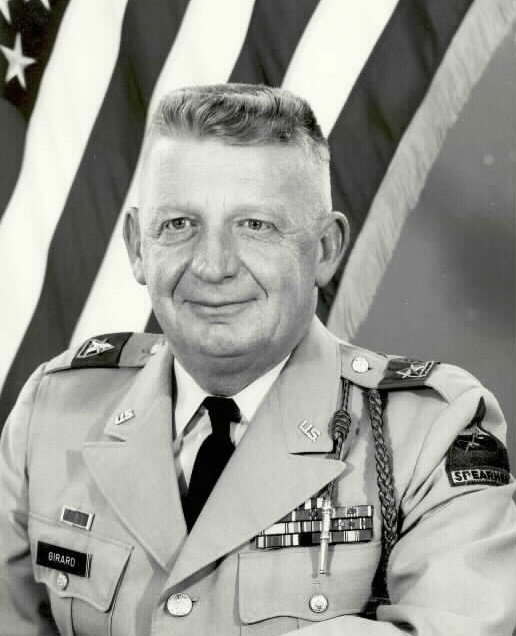
- Charles J. Girard as Assistant Division Commander of the 3rd Armored Division in 1966.
- Born: July 23, 1917; Sumter, South Carolina, US
- Died: January 17, 1970 (aged 52) Gia Định Province, South Vietnam
- Buried: Arlington National Cemetery
- Allegiance: United States
- Branch: United States Army
- Service years: 1938-1970
- Rank: Brigadier General
- Commands: 82nd Armored Reconnaissance Battalion; 2nd Battalion, 67th Armored Regiment; 83rd Reconnaissance Battalion; Combat Command A, 1st Armored Division; Combat Developments Command Experimentation Center; Capital Military Assistance Command, Saigon
- Conflicts: World War II; Vietnam War
- Awards: Distinguished Service Medal; Silver Star; Legion of Merit (3); Distinguished Flying Cross; Bronze Star Medal

Charles J. Girard (July 23, 1917 – January 17, 1970) was a brigadier general in the United States Army. Assigned to head the Capital Military Assistance Command in Saigon in November 1969, he suffered a cerebral hemorrhage two months later, becoming one of the highest-ranking American officers to die in South Vietnam during the Vietnam War.

A native of Sumter, South Carolina and a graduate of The Citadel, Girard taught school and served in the Army Reserve prior to World War II. During the war he took part in combat throughout Africa and Europe, and attained the rank of lieutenant colonel as commander of the 82nd Armored Reconnaissance Battalion. He remained in the Army after the war, and continued to serve in combat and training assignments, primarily in the Armor branch.

During the Vietnam War, Girard was Deputy Commander of the Capital Military Assistance Command (CMAC) in Saigon (March–November 1969). In November, he was appointed as CMAC's commander. In January 1970, Girard died from a cerebral hemorrhage while still serving in South Vietnam; he was buried at Arlington National Cemetery.

== Early life ==
Charles Jack Girard was born in Sumter, South Carolina on July 23, 1917, and he graduated from Sumter High School. In 1938 he graduated from The Citadel with a Bachelor of Science degree in business administration. Girard was commissioned through the Reserve Officers' Training Corps as a second lieutenant in the Army Reserve and taught high school from 1938 to 1940.

== World War II ==
In anticipation of U.S. entry into World War II, Girard was among thousands of reservists and National Guard members called to active duty in 1940. He completed the Infantry Officer Basic and Advanced Courses, and served initially as a platoon leader in the 82nd Armored Reconnaissance Battalion at Fort Benning, Georgia. His battalion was part of the 2nd Armored Division, and Girard rose to captain and commander of a company as his battalion served in the Mediterranean and European Theaters of Operations. He took part in the Tunisia, Sicily, Normandy, Northern France, Rhineland, Ardennes, and Central Europe campaigns, and he was battalion commander with the rank of major at the end of the war.

== Post-World War II ==
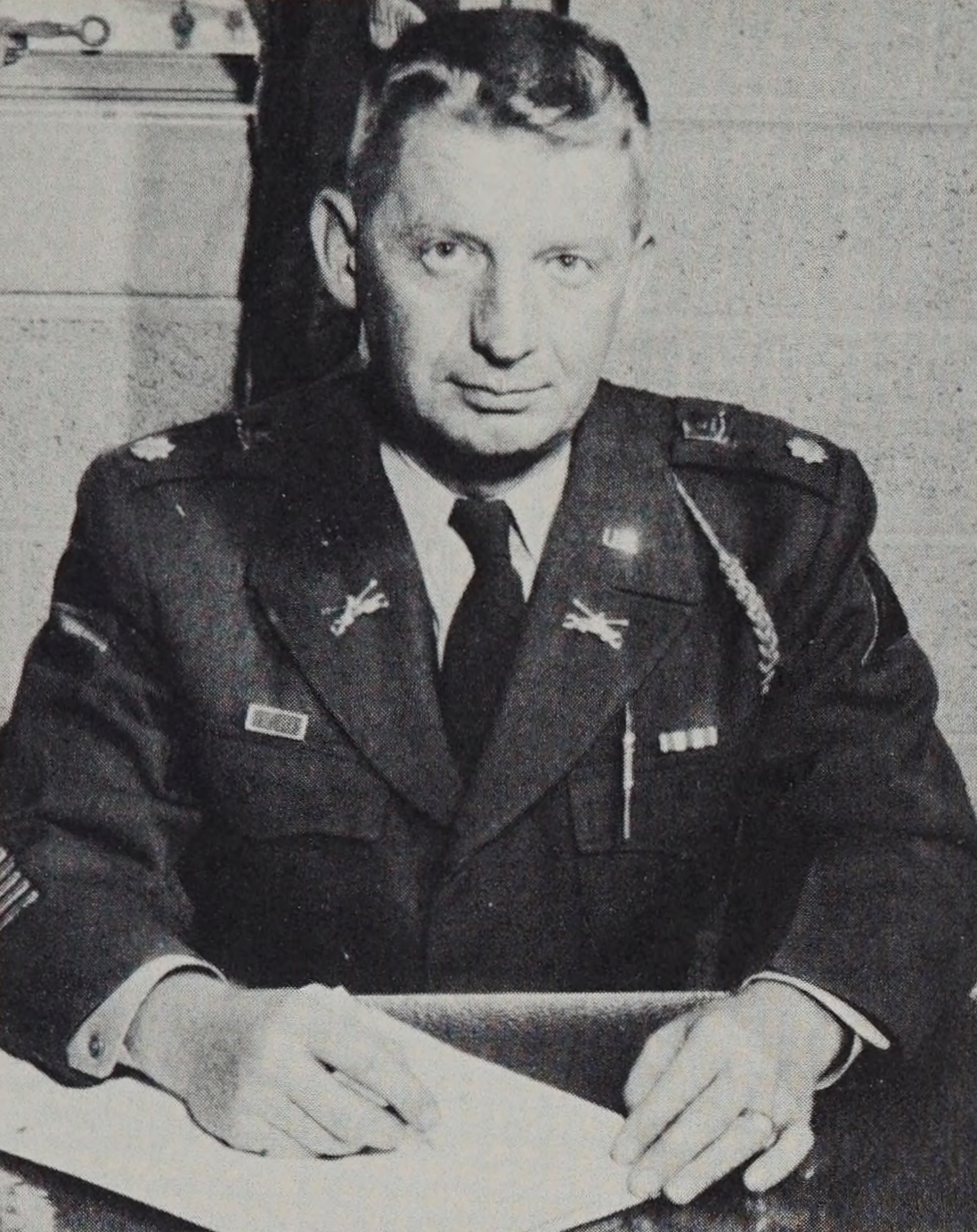
Girard as commanding officer of the 83rd Reconnaissance Battalion c. 1956

After the war Girard received his commission as a regular Army officer and transferred to the Cavalry. He remained in Europe as commander of 2nd Battalion, 67th Armored Regiment, 2nd Armored Division. In May 1946, he was assigned to the headquarters staff for United States Forces in Austria.

In 1947 Girard was assigned to the staff of the Georgia Military District Headquarters, and from 1949 to 1950 he was a student at the United States Army Command and General Staff College. He spent five years on the staff of the United States Army Armor School at Fort Knox. From 1955 to 1957 he commanded 83rd Reconnaissance Battalion, 3rd Armored Division, first at Fort Knox, and later in Europe.

Girard served in the Plans, Operations and Training (G-3) section at Headquarters, United States Army Europe from 1957 to 1959, first as chief of the NATO Training Section, and then chief of the Training Branch. From 1959 to 1960 he was a student at the United States Army War College, after which he served as deputy commander and then commander of Combat Command A, 1st Armored Division at Fort Hood.

== Later career ==
In 1961 Girard was assigned to the Doctrine and Concepts Division, Combat Developments Directorate in the office of the Army's Deputy Chief of Staff for Plans, Operations and Training (G-3), and he later served as chief of the Doctrine and Concepts Division. During this posting Girard carried out a temporary assignment as deputy chief of the Long Range Plans Group for the Howze Board. In 1963 he was appointed assistant director for Materiel Requirements in the office of the Army's Assistant Chief of Staff for Force Development.

In August 1963 Girard was assigned to command Combat Developments Command Experimentation Center at Fort Ord and promoted to brigadier general. In May, 1965 he was assigned as Assistant Chief of Staff for Data Systems at Headquarters, Seventh United States Army in Europe.

Girard was assigned to Frankfurt, West Germany as the 3rd Armored Division's Assistant Division Commander for Maneuver in July, 1966, and he served until January 1968. He was Assistant Deputy Chief of Staff for Military Operations & Reserve Forces at Headquarters, Continental Army Command until March, 1969.

== Vietnam War ==
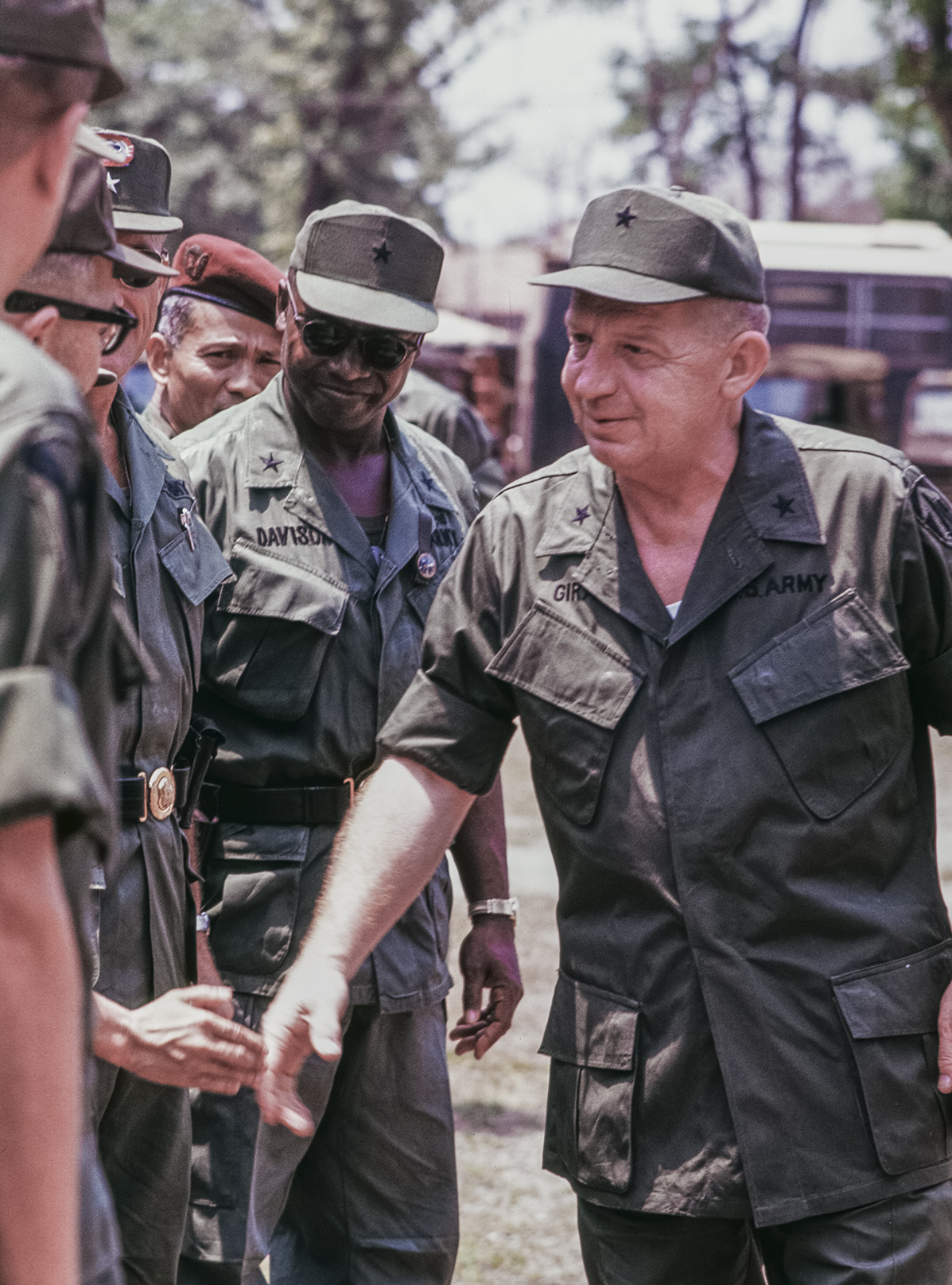
Saigon, March 1969. Girard arrives to become Deputy Commanding General, Capital Military Assistance Command. Behind him is BG Frederic Davison.

From March to November 1969 Girard was Deputy Commander of the Capital Military Assistance Command (CMAC) in Saigon, the unit that aided the South Vietnamese military in defending the city and its suburbs. In November, 1969 he was appointed commander, and he served until his death.

== Death and burial ==
On January 17, 1970, Girard was found dead in his quarters at the CMAC headquarters in Gia Định Province outside Saigon. His death was attributed to a cerebral hemorrhage, and he was one of the highest ranking American officers to die in South Vietnam during the Vietnam War. He was buried at Arlington National Cemetery, Section 1, Site 32–2.

== Awards and decorations ==
- Army Distinguished Service Medal
- Silver Star
- Legion of Merit with 2 Bronze Oak leaf clusters
- Distinguished Flying Cross
- Bronze Star Medal
- Army Commendation Medal with 1 Bronze Oak leaf cluster
- American Defense Service Medal
- American Campaign Medal
- European-African-Middle Eastern Campaign Medal with 1 Silver service star, 2 Bronze service stars and 1 Arrowhead device
- Medal for Humane Action with Germany Clasp
- World War II Victory Medal with 2 Bronze oak leaf clusters
- Army of Occupation Medal
- National Defense Service Medal
- Vietnam Service Medal
- Belgian Fourragère
- Vietnam Campaign Medal

== Family ==
Girard was married to Joan E. B. Minford, who served in the Women's Army Corps during World War II and attained the rank of captain before receiving her discharge in 1946. They were the parents of six children: Thomas A. Girard, PhD; Renee Julia Girard; Charles Jack Girard Jr.; Stephanie Joan Girard (deceased); Yvonne (Bonnie) Dawes Girard; and Marguerite Florence Girard.

== See also ==
U.S. Army general officers who died in the Vietnam War:

- Alfred Judson Force Moody
- Keith L. Ware
- William R. Bond
- John A. B. Dillard
- Carroll E. Adams Jr.
- George W. Casey Sr.
- Richard J. Tallman

Military offices
Preceded by Walter B. Richardson	Commander of Capital Military Assistance Command, Saigon; 1969–1970	Succeeded by Herbert E. Wolf
