= George W. Casey Sr. =

United States Army general

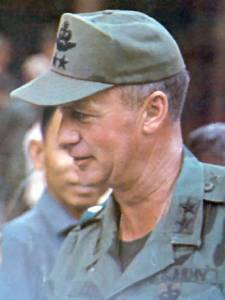
- Born: George William Casey; March 9, 1922; Boston, Massachusetts, US
- Died: July 7, 1970 (aged 48) near Da Lat, Lam Dong Province, South Vietnam
- Burial place: Arlington National Cemetery
- Education: West Point; Georgetown University; George Washington University; Harvard University
- Children: 5, including George Jr.
- Military career
- Allegiance: United States
- Branch: United States Army
- Service years: 1945–1970
- Rank: Major General
- Unit: 1st Cavalry Division (Airmobile)
- Commands: 3rd Brigade, 8th Infantry Division; 2nd Brigade, 1st Cavalry Division; 1st Cavalry Division
- Conflicts: Korean War; Vietnam War †
- Awards: Distinguished Service Medal; Silver Star (3); Legion of Merit (3); Distinguished Flying Cross; Bronze Star with "V" Device; Purple Heart (2); Air Medal (8)

George William Casey Sr. (March 9, 1922 – July 7, 1970) was a United States Army major general who was killed in a helicopter crash in July 1970, in South Vietnam. General Casey, who had served in the Korean War, was in command of the US 1st Cavalry Division at the time of his death. His son George W. Casey Jr. served as the 36th Chief of Staff of the United States Army from April 2007 to April 2011.

== Early life and education ==
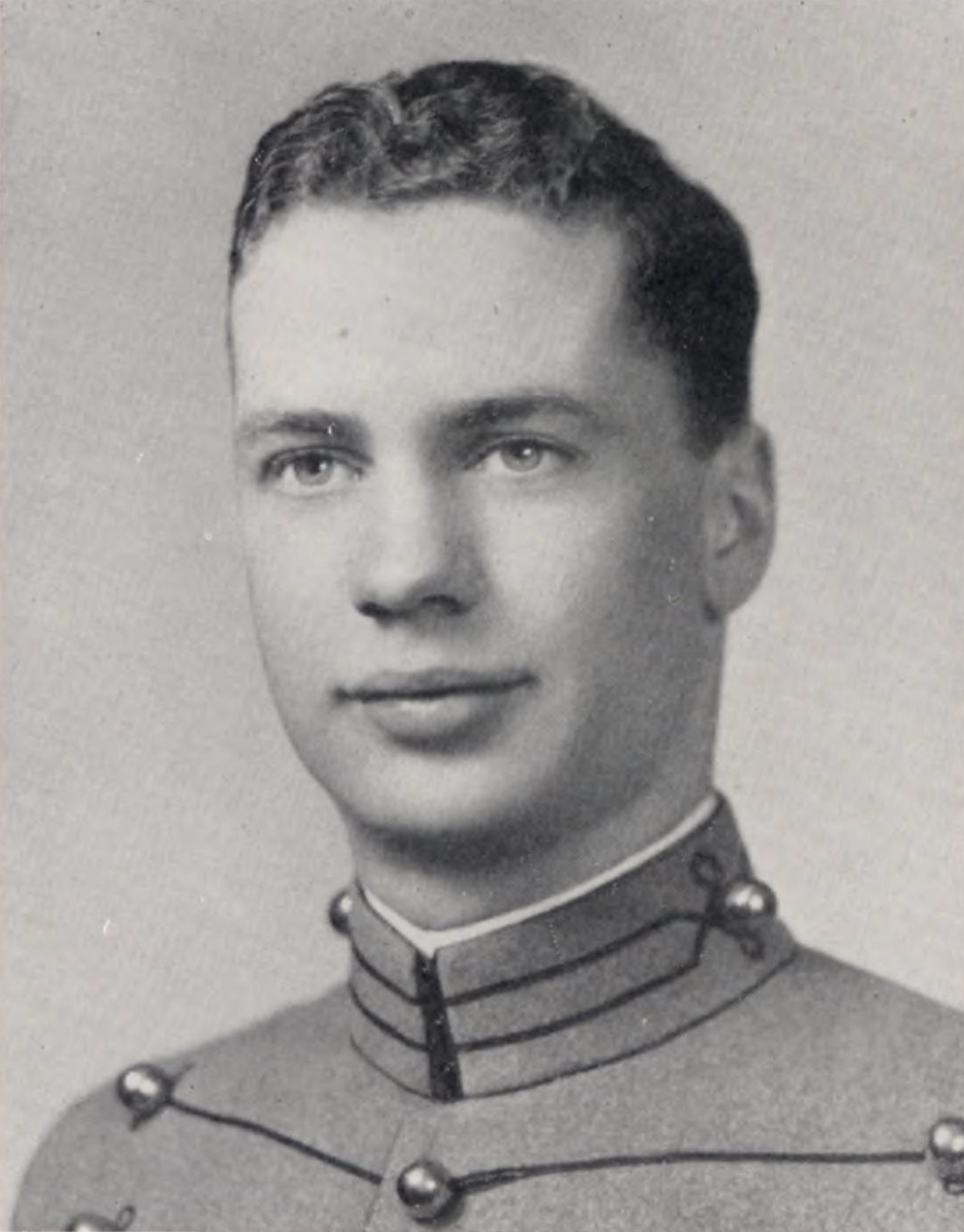
At West Point in 1945

Casey was born into an Irish-American family in Boston, Massachusetts on March 9, 1922. He attended Harvard College for a year before transferring to the United States Military Academy at West Point, graduating with a Bachelor of Science degree in 1945, a year early because of World War II. He earned a Master of Arts degree in international relations from Georgetown University in 1958 and a Master of Business Administration degree from George Washington University in 1965. He went on to conduct postgraduate study at the Center for International Affairs at Harvard University.

== Military career ==
Casey completed the Infantry School Basic Course in November 1945, and was sent to Japan in December. He served with the 188th Parachute Infantry Regiment with the Far East Command from January 1946 to November 1948, and then served with the 17th Airborne Division at Camp Pickett, Virginia, from December 1948 to May 1949. Casey then transferred to the 187th Airborne Infantry Regiment, and then the 11th Airborne Division at Camp Campbell, Kentucky, where he served from June 1949 to November 1951. His post-war assignments included aide-de-camp to General Lyman L. Lemnitzer.

=== Korean War ===
Casey served in combat during the Korean War, commanding a 7th Infantry Division company in engagements including the Battle of Heartbreak Ridge, for which he received the Silver Star. He returned to the United States in July 1952.

=== Post war ===
In 1957 he graduated from the United States Army Command and General Staff College. In 1963 he graduated from the National War College. He commanded 3rd Brigade, 8th Infantry Division in West Germany from 1963 to 1965.

=== Vietnam War ===
In the late 1960s he served with the 1st Cavalry Division, first as chief of staff, then as commander of 2nd Brigade, and later as assistant division commander. He served as the Chief of Staff of the division, and later commander of 2nd Brigade, 1st Air Cavalry Division, in South Vietnam, from September 1966 to October 1967.

Casey served with U.S. Army Combat Developments Command at Fort Belvoir, Virginia, from October 1967 to August 1968, and then as Commanding General of the U.S. Army Combat Developments Command Combat Arms Group at Fort Leavenworth, Kansas, from September 1968 to July 1969. While home on leave from serving in Vietnam, he was promoted to major general during a ceremony on April 30, 1970, at the Pentagon. In May 1970, he assumed command of the 1st Cavalry Division in Vietnam.

=== Death ===
On July 7, 1970, he was killed in a helicopter crash in South Vietnam when the UH-1H Huey helicopter he was co-piloting hit a mountain due to poor weather near Bao Luc as he was en route to Cam Ranh to visit wounded troops, before they were transported to Japan for medical treatment. Seven men died in the crash. The wreckage of the helicopter was found within days.

Casey was buried in Arlington National Cemetery.

== Awards and decorations ==
His awards and decorations include:

Badges

Combat Infantryman Badge (2nd Award)
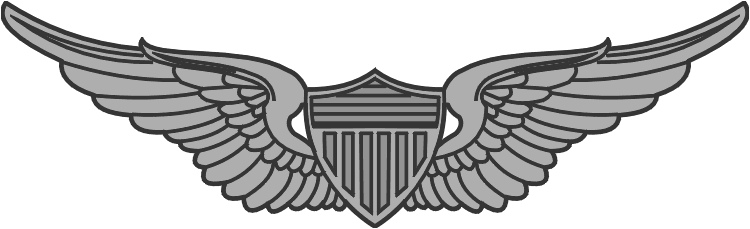
Basic Army Aviator Badge
Master Parachutist Badge

Decorations

Army Distinguished Service Medal
Silver Star with two bronze oak leaf clusters
Legion of Merit with two bronze oak leaf clusters
Distinguished Flying Cross
Bronze Star with "V" Device
Purple Heart with bronze oak leaf cluster
Air Medal with award numeral 8
Army Commendation Medal

Service Medals

American Campaign Medal
Asiatic-Pacific Campaign Medal
World War II Victory Medal
Army of Occupation Medal with 'Japan' clasp
National Defense Service Medal with service star
Korean Service Medal with two bronze campaign stars
Vietnam Service Medal with silver campaign star

Foreign Awards

Vietnam Gallantry Cross with two palms and silver star
Vietnam Armed Forces Honor Medal
Republic of Korea Presidential Unit Citation
Republic of Vietnam Gallantry Cross Unit Citation
United Nations Korea Medal
Vietnam Campaign Medal
Republic of Korea War Service Medal

== Personal life ==
Casey and his wife had three daughters and two sons. One of those sons, George W. Casey Jr. (born July 22, 1948) is a retired four-star general who served as the 36th Chief of Staff of the United States Army from April 10, 2007, to April 10, 2011.

== See also ==
U.S. Army general officers who died in the Vietnam War:

- Alfred Judson Force Moody
- Keith L. Ware
- Charles J. Girard
- William R. Bond
- John A. B. Dillard
- Carroll E. Adams Jr.
- Richard J. Tallman
