= Richard J. Tallman =

United States Army general (1923–1970)

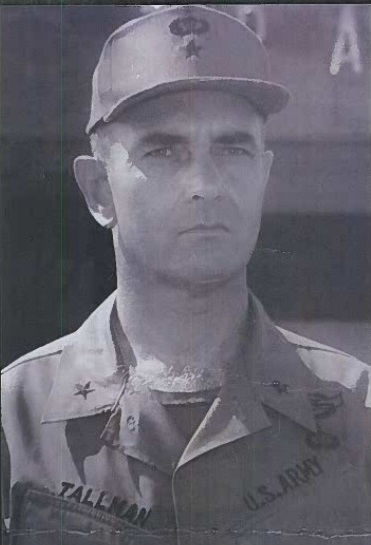
- Born: March 28, 1925; Wayne County, Pennsylvania, U.S.
- Died: July 9, 1972 (aged 47); An Lộc, South Vietnam
- Burial place: West Point Cemetery
- Military career
- Allegiance: United States of America
- Branch: United States Army
- Service years: 1943–1972
- Rank: Brigadier General
- Commands: 2nd Battalion, 501st Infantry Regiment; 3rd Brigade, 101st Airborne
- Conflicts: World War II: Battle of the Bulge; Korean War; Vietnam War: Battle of An Loc (DOW)
- Awards: Silver Star; Legion of Merit (4); Purple Heart; Combat Infantryman Badge (3)

Richard Joseph Tallman (March 28, 1925 – July 9, 1972) was a United States Army brigadier general who was killed by North Vietnamese artillery fire in 1972 during the Battle of An Lộc. He was the last U.S. Army general to die in the Vietnam War. He was on his third tour in South Vietnam.

== Early life and education ==
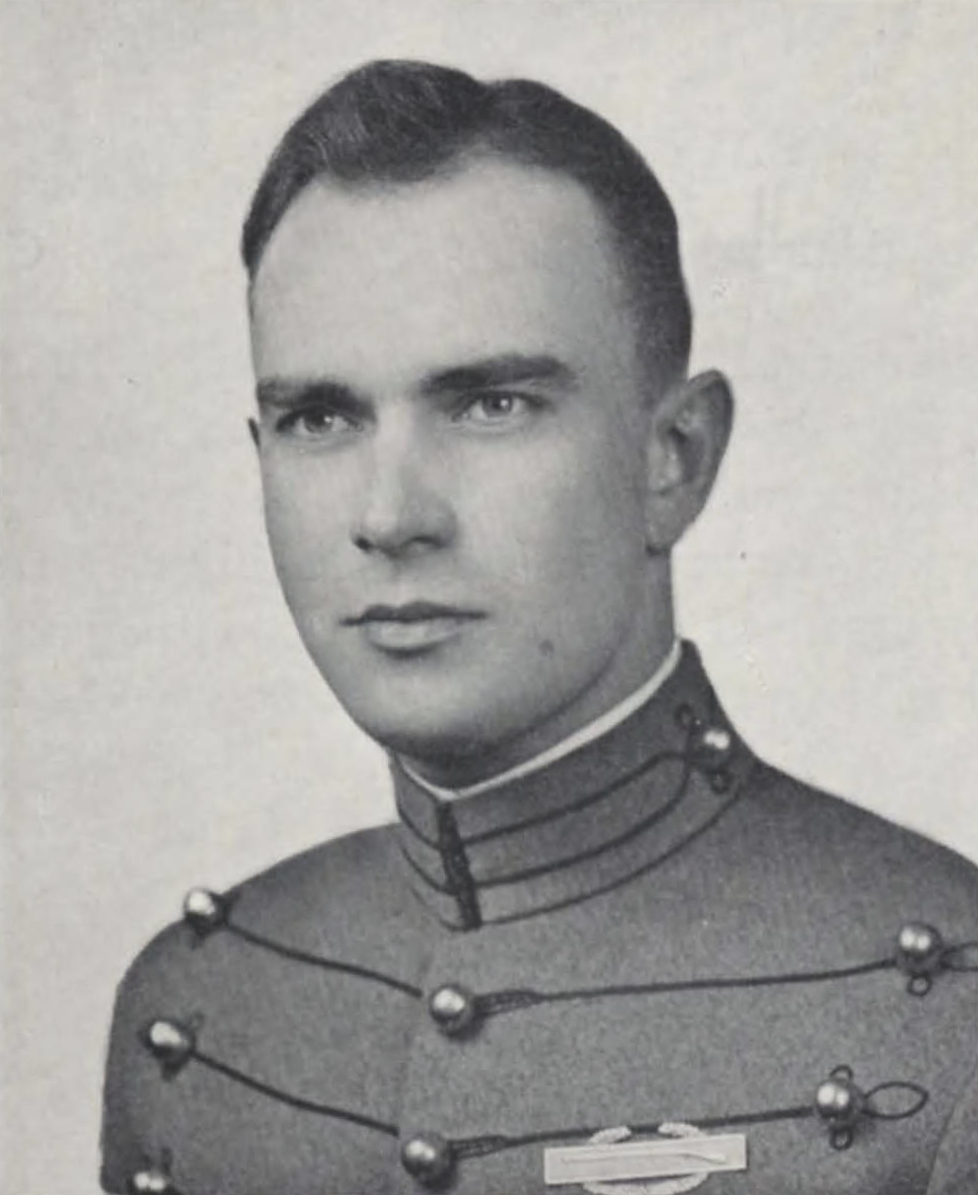
Tallman as a West Point cadet in 1949

He was born in Honesdale, Wayne County, Pennsylvania. Tallman married Evelyn Phillips in 1949. They had seven children. He graduated from Honesdale High School in 1943. After serving as an enlisted soldier in World War II he was admitted to West Point where he graduated in 1949 and was commissioned a second lieutenant in the regular Army.

== U.S. Army career ==
Shortly after high school graduation he was drafted into the Army and sent to the European theatre as an infantryman. He fought in the Battle of the Bulge as a machine gunner within the 42nd Infantry Division. During World War II he earned a battlefield (reserve) commission from private first class to 2nd lieutenant.

1st Lt Tallman saw action during the Korean War in 1951-2 with the 3rd Infantry Division.

He served as a tactical officer and military history teacher and as assistant commandant of cadets at West Point.

=== Vietnam War ===
Tallman served as senior advisor to the ARVN 22nd Infantry Division in 1964.

Then-Lieutenant Colonel Tallman commanded the 2nd Battalion, 501st Infantry Regiment in 1967.

On 18 June 1971, then-Colonel Tallman became commander of the 3rd Brigade of the 101st Airborne Division.

In January 1972 he was appointed as chief of staff of Third [Military] Regional Assistance Command (TRAC) which was responsible for overseeing all U.S. military advisors throughout the 3rd Military Region. On 27 June he was appointed deputy commander of TRAC and was promoted to brigadier general on 28 June.

==== Death ====
On 9 July 1972, Tallman and his aides had just landed at An Lộc to observe ARVN counter-offensive operations at the conclusion of the Battle of An Lộc when they were hit by North Vietnamese artillery fire, three of the group were killed instantly, while Tallman and two others were wounded. The wounded men were evacuated to the 3rd Field Hospital in Saigon where Tallman died of his wounds. He was the last U.S. Army general to die in South Vietnam.

== Memorials ==
The Brigadier General Richard J. Tallman Memorial Bridge in Honesdale is named in his honor.

== See also (U.S. general officers killed during the Vietnam War) ==
- Alfred Judson Force Moody
- Keith L. Ware
- Charles J. Girard
- William R. Bond
- John A. B. Dillard
- Carroll E. Adams Jr.
- George W. Casey Sr.
