= John A. B. Dillard =

United States Army general (1919–1970)

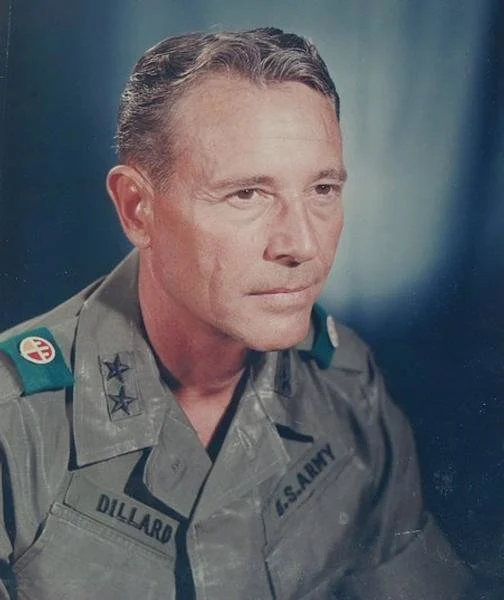
- Born: September 1, 1919; Marin County, California, U.S.
- Died: May 12, 1970 (aged 50); Pleiku Province, South Vietnam
- Burial place: Arlington National Cemetery
- Military career
- Allegiance: United States of America
- Branch: United States Army
- Service years: 1942–1970
- Rank: Major General
- Commands: Engineer Command, Vietnam
- Conflicts: World War II; Korean War; Vietnam War †
- Awards: Legion of Merit (2); Air Medal (2); Purple Heart

John A. B. Dillard (September 1, 1919 – May 12, 1970) was a United States Army major general who was killed in action on May 12, 1970, in South Vietnam. General Dillard was one of five U.S. Army general officers killed in action in the Vietnam War.

== Early life and family ==
General Dillard was married to Betty L. Hawkins and had three children, John A. B. 3rd, Gerry and Revalee.

== Education ==
General Dillard graduated from the Virginia Military Institute, Class of 1942 with a BS degree in civil engineering.

== US Army career ==
Dillard served as a Platoon Leader and Company Commander in Europe during World War II.

During the Korean War from July 1952 until July 1953, he served as a Battalion Operations Officer with the 25th Infantry Division in South Korea.

In November 1969, General Dillard was assigned to South Vietnam as Chief of the Engineer Command.

== Death ==
On 12 May 1970, Major General Dillard and nine other Americans were killed when a UH-1 helicopter they were aboard was hit by enemy fire and crashed in the Central Highlands, 10 miles (16 km) southwest of Pleiku and 220 miles (350 km) northwest of Saigon. Also killed was Colonel Carroll Edward Adams Jr. (posthumously promoted to brigadier general), commander of the 937th Engineer Group. Sergeant Major Robert W. Elkey was the only survivor and was seriously injured.

Dillard was buried at Arlington National Cemetery.

== See also ==
U.S. Army general officers killed in action in the Vietnam War:

- Alfred Judson Force Moody
- Keith L. Ware
- Charles J. Girard
- William R. Bond
- Carroll E. Adams Jr.
- George W. Casey, Sr.
- Richard J. Tallman
