= General Moody =

General Moody may refer to:

- Alfred Judson Force Moody (1918–1967), U.S. Army brigadier general
- Richard Clement Moody (1813–1887), British Army major general
- Young Marshall Moody (1822–1866), Confederate States Army brigadier general

== See also ==
- Attorney General Moody (disambiguation)
