= Richard Tallman =

Richard Tallman may refer to:

- Richard C. Tallman (born 1953), American judge
- Richard J. Tallman (1925–1972), U.S. Army general
