= George W. Casey Jr. =

US Army general (born 1948)

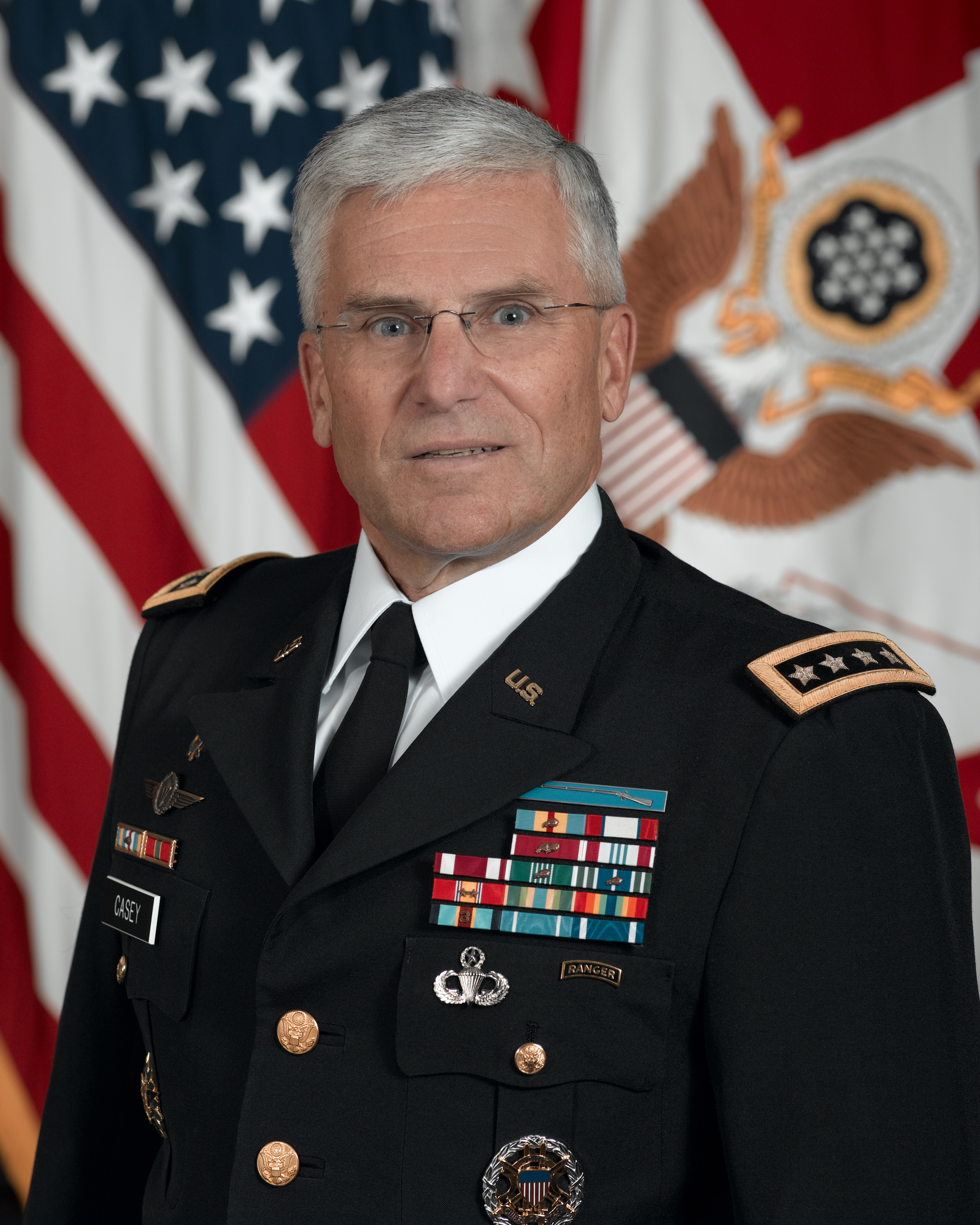
- Official portrait, 2007
- Born: George William Casey Jr. 22 July 1948 (age 78); Sendai, Japan
- Education: Georgetown University (BS); University of Denver (MA)
- Father: George W. Casey Sr.
- Military career
- Allegiance: United States
- Branch: United States Army
- Service years: 1970–2011
- Rank: General
- Commands: Chief of Staff of the United States Army; Multi-National Force – Iraq; Vice Chief of Staff of the United States Army; 1st Armored Division; Joint Warfighting Center; 3rd Brigade, 1st Cavalry Division
- Conflicts: Operation Joint Endeavor; Iraq War
- Awards: Defense Distinguished Service Medal (4); Army Distinguished Service Medal (2); Legion of Merit (3); Defense Meritorious Service Medal; Meritorious Service Medal

George William Casey Jr. (born 22 July 1948) is a retired four-star general who was the 36th Chief of Staff of the United States Army from 10 April 2007 to 10 April 2011. He was Commanding General, Multi-National Force – Iraq from June 2004 to 8 February 2007, and was in the army for his entire adult working life. He now resides in Arlington, Virginia.

== Early life and education ==
Casey was born in Sendai during the Allied occupation of Japan. His father, George W. Casey Sr., was a West Point graduate who rose to the rank of major general and served in the Korean War and the Vietnam War. His father commanded the 1st Cavalry Division in Vietnam. He was killed on 7 July 1970, when his command helicopter crashed in South Vietnam en route to a hospital to visit wounded American soldiers.

Casey, a military brat, grew up on army posts in the United States, Japan, and Germany and graduated from Boston College High School in Boston, Massachusetts. After high school, he applied to West Point, like his father, but was unsuccessful. He earned a Bachelor of Science degree in international relations from Georgetown University in 1970 and later a Master of Arts degree in international relations from the University of Denver in 1980. Additionally, Casey worked for Vince Lombardi during one summer when the latter was coach of the Washington Redskins.

== Career ==
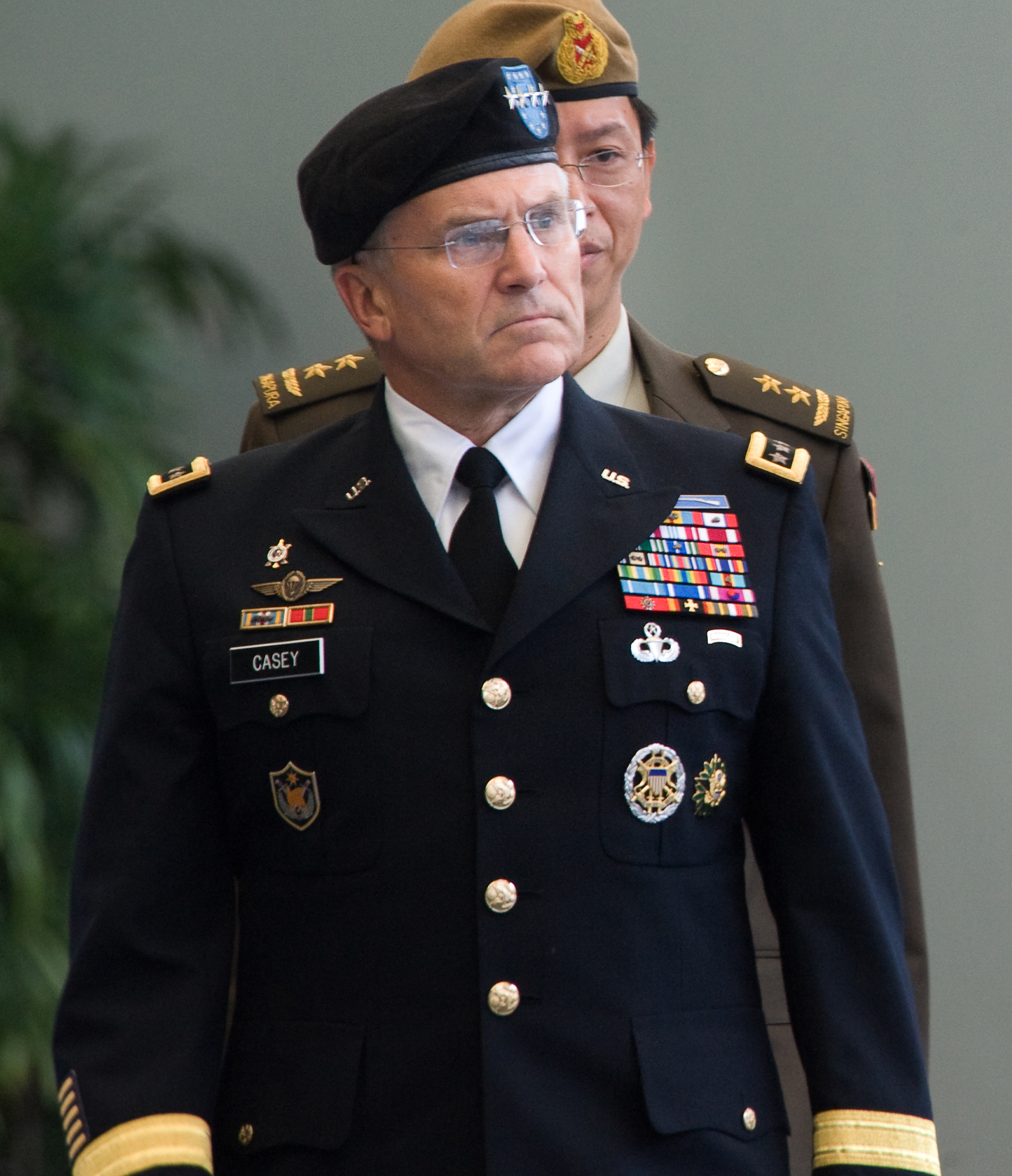
Casey during a Singapore visit in 2009

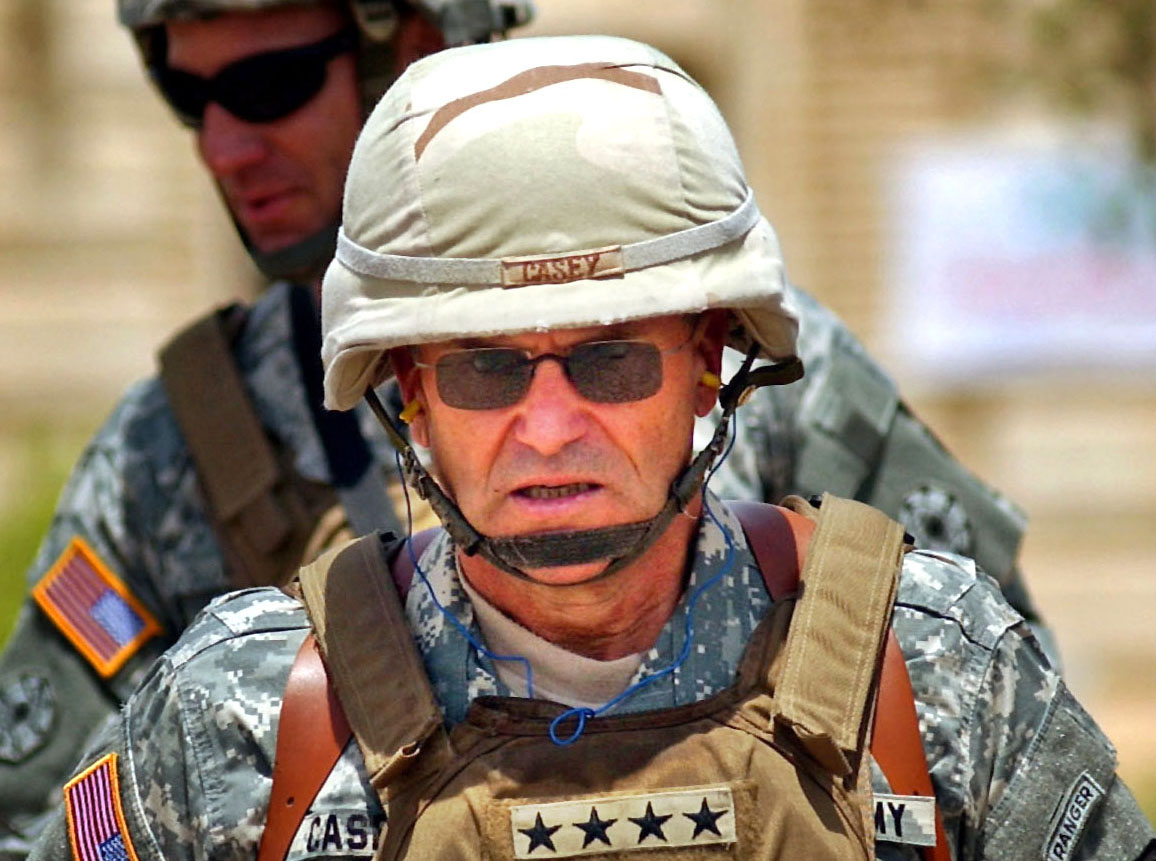
Casey in Tikrit, Iraq, in 2006

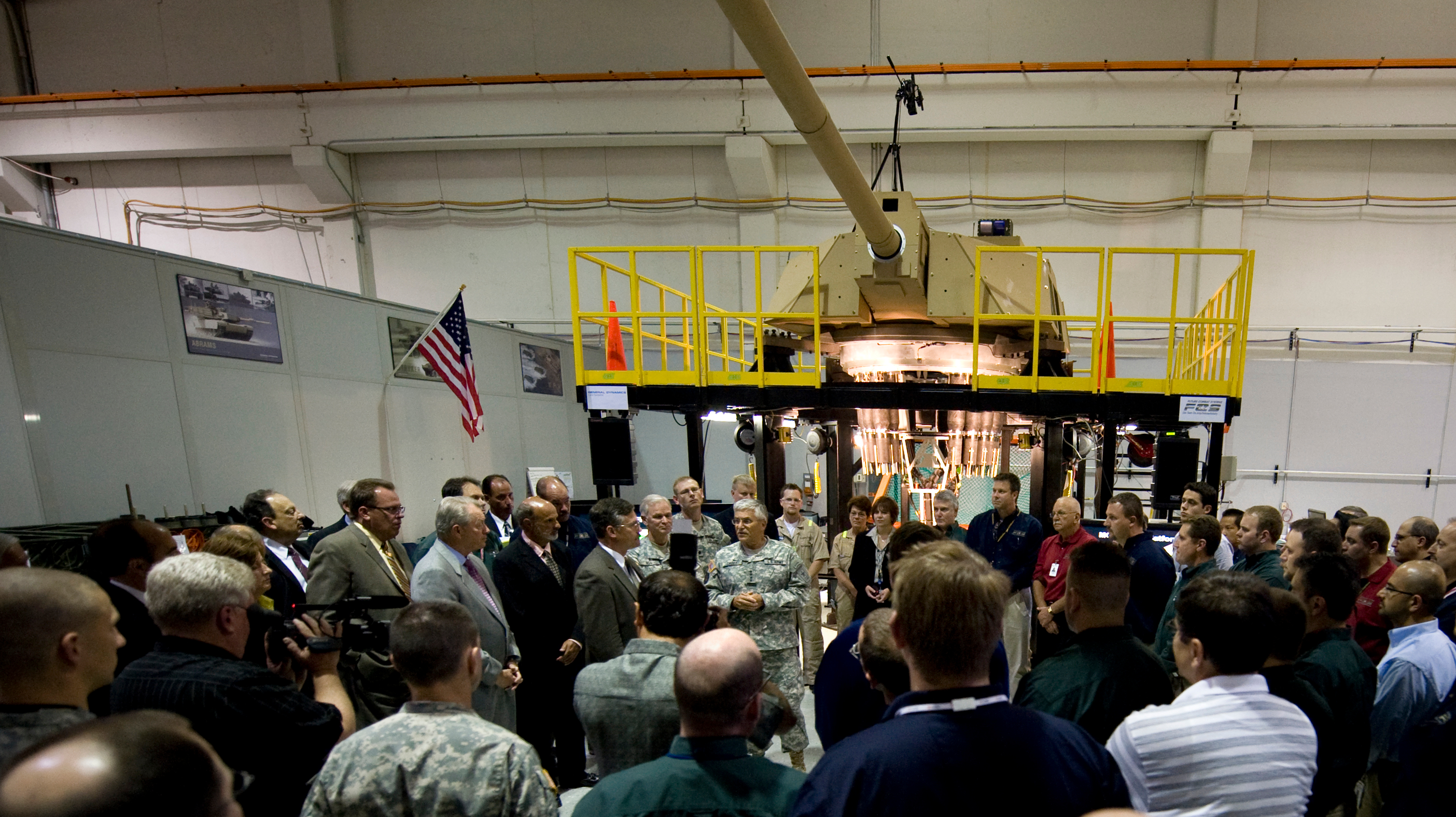
Casey speaks with the press about Future Combat Systems and the Manned Ground Vehicle program in June 2008

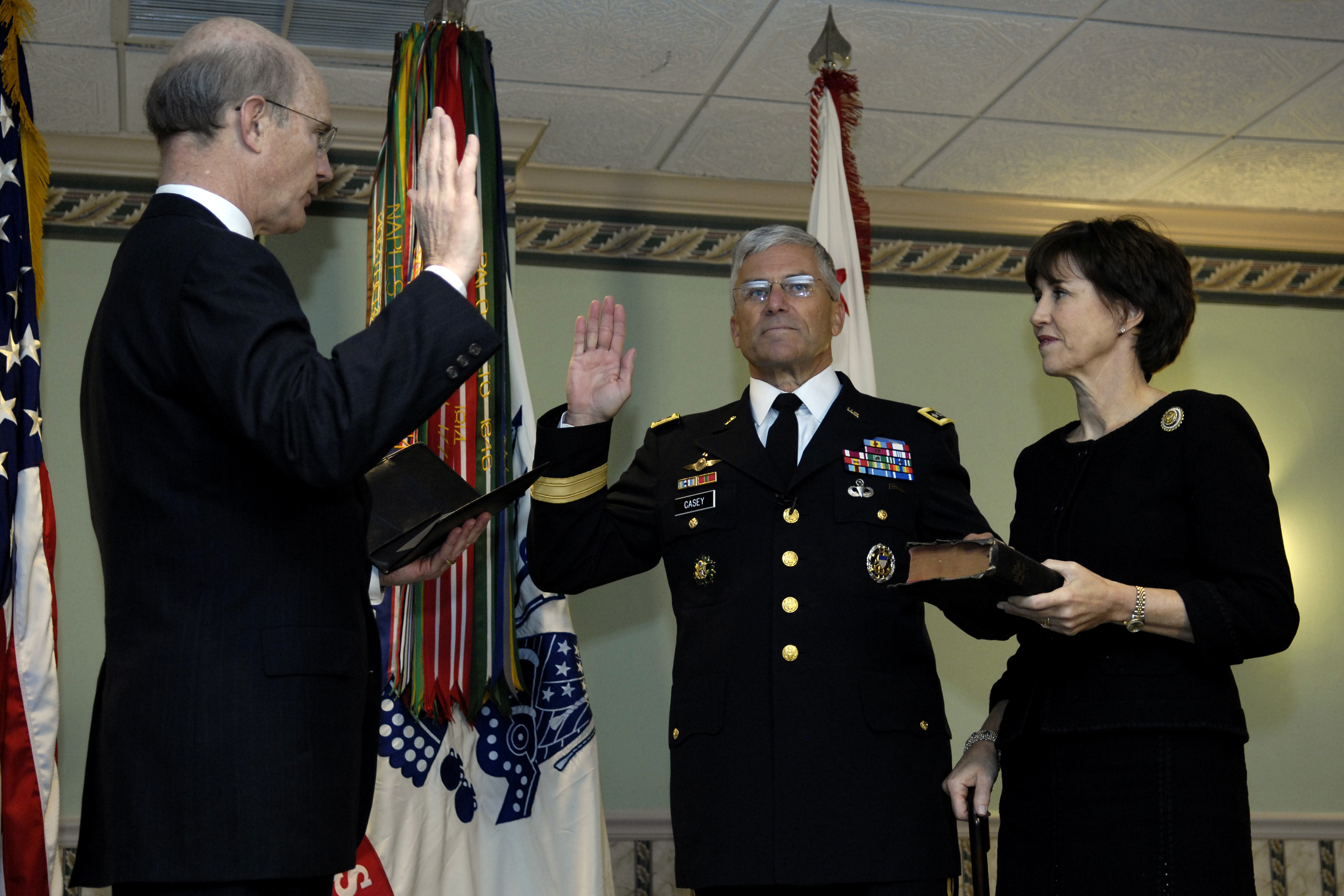
Acting Secretary of the Army Pete Geren swears in Casey as the 36th Army chief of staff at Fort Myer, Virginia, 10 April 2007

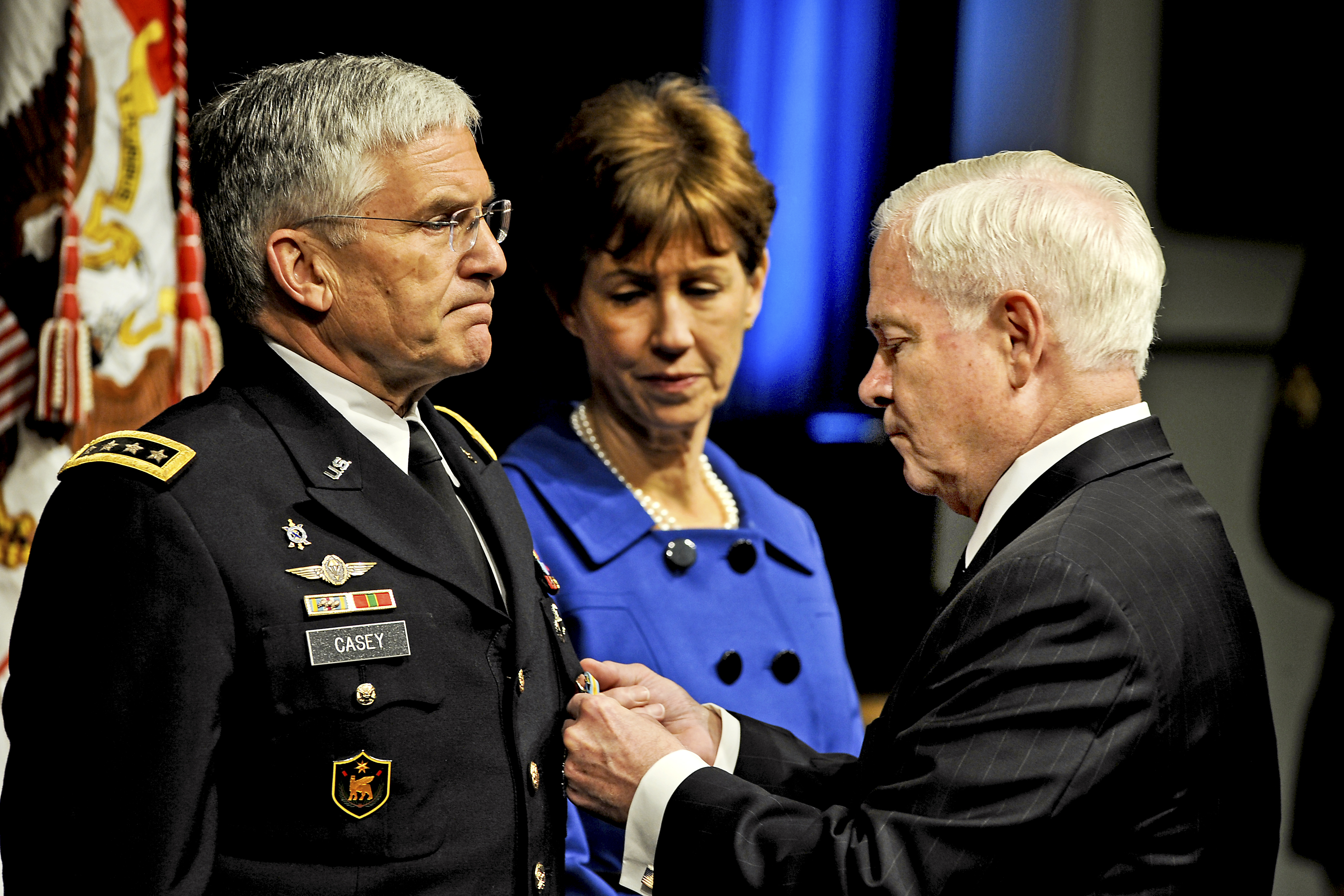
Secretary of Defense Robert M. Gates presents the Defense Distinguished Service Medal to Casey

Casey was commissioned through the Army Reserve Officers' Training Corps in 1970 following graduation from Georgetown University. In 1990–1991, he attended MIT Seminar XXI.

Casey was in the Mechanized Infantry during the command portion of his career. He was the commander of the 3rd Brigade of the 1st Cavalry Division, and the Assistant Division Commander – Maneuver (later Assistant Division Commander – Support) of the 1st Armored Division in Germany. He deployed as part of Operation Joint Endeavor to Bosnia-Herzegovina from July 1996 to August 1997. He and the Rear Command Post staff were based in Slavonski Brod, Croatia. Casey took command of the 1st Armored Division in July 1999.

After relinquishing command of the division in July 2001, Casey served in a senior staff position in the Pentagon as the Director of Strategic Plans and Policy (J-5), the Joint Staff from October 2001 to January 2003. His next position was Director of the Joint Staff in Washington, D.C. from January 2003 to October 2003. Following these assignments, Casey was nominated and confirmed as the 30th Vice Chief of Staff of the Army, serving in that post until June 2004.

=== Multi-National Force – Iraq ===
Casey was the senior coalition commander in Iraq from June 2004 to February 2007. He replaced Lieutenant General Ricardo S. Sanchez. Casey's goal was to encourage the Iraqis to take ownership of their problems and responsibility for their own security.

In 2005, Casey was hopeful the December 2005 Iraqi elections could lead to a more unified and moderate Iraq which—in conjunction with the training of Iraqi security forces—could pave the way for U.S. troop reductions in early 2006. In August 2005, Casey used specific troop numbers in his public discussion of a possible drawdown. He said the troop level of 138,000 could be reduced by 30,000 in the early months of 2006 as Iraqi security forces took on a greater role. President George W. Bush publicly called the talk "speculation" and rebuked the general. The bombing of the al-Askari Mosque, a sacred Shia religious site in Samarra, is believed to have stoked sectarian tensions and derailed coalition plans to speedily transfer significant security responsibility to the Iraqi government by the end of 2006.

In January 2007, Casey implied his opposition to a troop surge:

... the longer we in the U.S. forces continue to bear the main burden of Iraq's security, it lengthens the time that the government of Iraq has to take the hard decisions about reconciliation and dealing with the militias. And the other thing is that they can continue to blame us for all of Iraq's difficulties, which are at base of their problems. It's always been my view that a heavy and sustained American military presence was not going to solve the problems in Iraq over the long term.

=== Army Chief of Staff ===
In January 2007, President George W. Bush nominated Casey for elevation to Chief of Staff of the Army. Opposition to the nomination came from Senators John McCain and Lindsey Graham who questioned Casey's leadership in Iraq, with McCain's criticisms focused on Casey's "optimistic and rosy scenarios" of progress in the Iraq War. In spite of this, the Senate confirmed his nomination on 8 February 2007, with a bipartisan vote of 83–14.

On 10 February 2007, Casey relinquished command in Iraq to General David Petraeus. Casey officially succeeded General Peter Schoomaker as Chief of Staff of the Army on 10 April 2007.

In the immediate aftermath of the 2009 Fort Hood shooting committed by United States Army psychiatrist Nidal Hasan, Casey expressed concern about jumping to conclusions before the investigation was completed, telling CNN's John King that "this increased speculation could cause a backlash against some of our Muslim soldiers" and "As great a tragedy as this was, it would be a shame if our diversity became a casualty as well." Several months later, in a February 2010 interview, Casey said: "Our diversity not only in our Army, but in our country, is a strength. And as horrific as this tragedy was, if our diversity becomes a casualty, I think that's worse."

== Retirement ==
Casey retired on 11 April 2011. Casey, whose parents were from Massachusetts, moved to Arlington, Virginia upon his retirement. Casey is currently a Distinguished Senior Lecturer of Leadership at Cornell University's Johnson Graduate School of Management as well as a teaching fellow at the University of Virginia's Darden School of Business.

He has also taught civil–military relations at the Josef Korbel School of International Studies at the University of Denver since 2012, where a Leadership Scholars Program has been endowed in his name.

Casey has also served as chairman of the USO Board of Governors and on the boards of Student Veterans of America and ThanksUSA.

Since leaving the military, Casey has authored Strategic Reflections, Operation Iraqi Freedom, July 2004 – 2007 and Supporting Veterans After 50 Years of the All-Volunteer Force (with Joel Kupersmith), and has written on leadership including “Leading in a VUCA World” in Fortune.

== Dates of rank ==
Rank	Date
Second lieutenant	21 October 1970
First lieutenant	21 October 1971
Captain	21 October 1974
Major	6 September 1980
Lieutenant colonel	1 August 1985
Colonel	1 May 1991
Brigadier general	1 July 1996
Major general	1 September 1999
Lieutenant general	31 October 2001
General	1 December 2003

== Awards and decorations ==
Defense Distinguished Service Medal (with three bronze oak leaf clusters)
Army Distinguished Service Medal (with bronze oak leaf cluster)
Legion of Merit (with two bronze oak leaf clusters)
Defense Meritorious Service Medal
Meritorious Service Medal
Army Commendation Medal (with bronze oak leaf cluster)
Army Achievement Medal (with bronze oak leaf cluster)
Joint Meritorious Unit Award (with three bronze oak leaf clusters)
Army Superior Unit Award
National Defense Service Medal (with two bronze service stars)
Iraq Campaign Medal (with two bronze service stars)
Global War on Terrorism Expeditionary Medal
Global War on Terrorism Service Medal
Armed Forces Service Medal
Army Service Ribbon
Army Overseas Service Ribbon (with award numeral "4")
United Nations Medal
NATO Medal for Yugoslavia
Polish Army Medal in Gold (worn without golden ribbon bar device) – awarded by Polish Minister of National Defence Radosław Sikorski on November 8, 2005
Legion of Honor, Commander French
Pingat Jasa Gemilang (Tentera) – awarded by Singapore Minister of Defense Teo Chee Hean on August 26, 2009
Grand Cordon of the Order of the Rising Sun – Casey was awarded the first class of the Grand Cordon of the Order of the Rising Sun by Japanese Defense Minister Toshimi Kitazawa December 21, 2010
Order of National Security Merit (South-Korea) Tong-il Medal
Bundeswehr Gold Cross of Honor
Condecoración Cruz de la Victoria (Chile)
Georgia Commendation Medal – State of Georgia, USA; Presented to BG Casey by LTC Frank Williams, 3ID ROC, Georgia Army National Guard – while in Slavonski Brod, Croatia, 1996

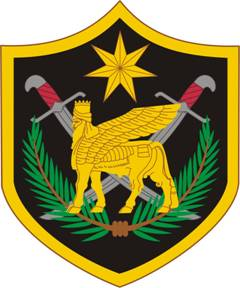
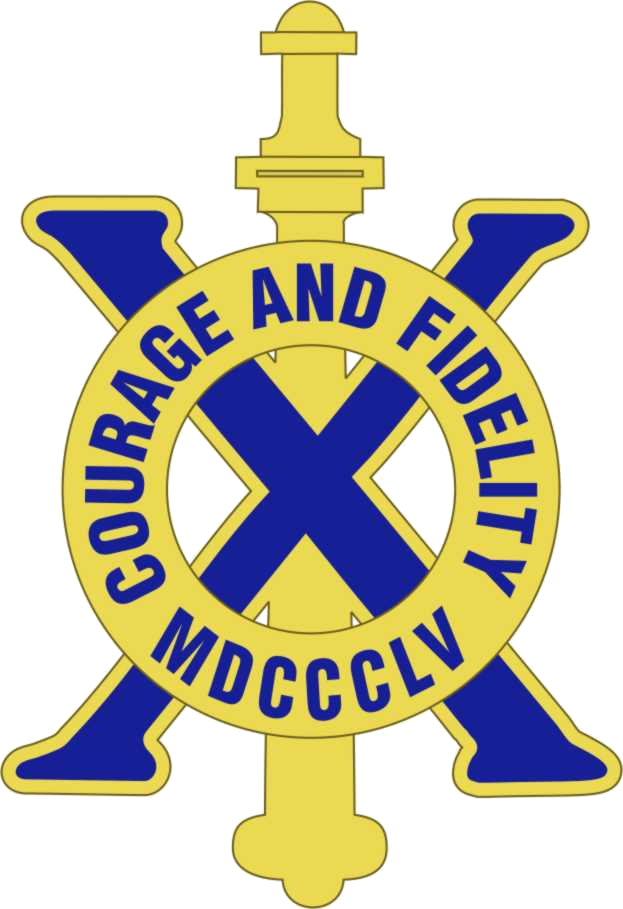
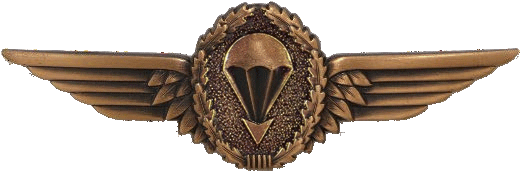
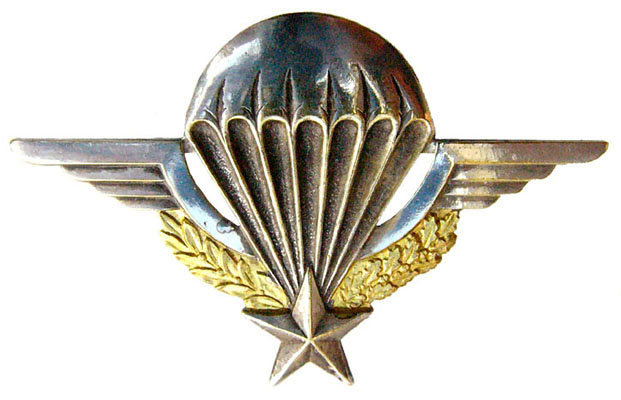
Expert Infantryman Badge
Master Parachutist Badge
Ranger Tab
Office of the Joint Chiefs of Staff Identification Badge
Army Staff Identification Badge
MNF-I Combat Service Identification Badge
10th Infantry Regiment Distinctive Unit Insignia
5 Overseas Service Bars
German Parachutist Badge in bronze
Basic French Parachutist Badge (French: Brevet de Parachutisme militaire)

== Notes ==
Military offices
Preceded by Jack Keane	Vice Chief of Staff of the United States Army; 2003–2004	Succeeded by Gen. Richard A. Cody
Preceded by Ricardo S. Sanchez	Commander Multinational Force Iraq; 2004–2007	Succeeded by David H. Petraeus
Preceded by Peter J. Schoomaker	Chief of Staff of the United States Army; 2007–2011	Succeeded by Martin E. Dempsey
Order of precedence
Preceded by James Cartwright	United States order of precedence as of 2010	Succeeded by Gary Roughead
