= Attorney General Moody (disambiguation) =

William Henry Moody (1853–1917) was an Attorney General of the United States. Attorney General Moody may also refer to:

- Ashley Moody (born 1975), Attorney General of Florida
- Dan Moody (1893–1966), Attorney General of Texas

== See also ==
- General Moody (disambiguation)
