= 82nd Armored Reconnaissance Battalion =

United States Army unit

- Active: July 15, 1940–November 22, 1946; January 17, 1949–?
- Country: United States
- Branch: United States Army
- Role: Armored reconnaissance
- Part of: 2nd Armored Division
- Motto(s): "Audacity"
- Engagements: World War II: Operation Torch; Operation Husky; Operation Overlord; Advance to the Rhine; Invasion of Germany
- Decorations: Presidential Unit Citation; Belgian fourragère

Commanders
- Notable commanders: Charles J. Girard

The 82nd Armored Reconnaissance Battalion was a part of the 2nd Armored Division, and was activated July 15, 1940, at Fort Benning, Georgia, for World War II. The organization was made up of trained men, from cavalry and reconnaissance units. The reconnaissance battalion was known as the "eyes and ears", of the 2nd Armored Division.

== History ==
The battalion mainly used the M-8 Light Armored Car, as it was fast, up to 56 mph (90 km/h), and gave some protection from small arms fire. M8 was equipped with a 37 mm gun and 6X6 wheel drive. The M8 was the main reconnaissance vehicle used by the US military in World War II. Also used was M20 scout car, which was a M-8 without the 37 mm gun and turret. In its place was an anti-aircraft ring mount for a .50-caliber machine gun. A bazooka was provided for the crew to compensate for its lack of anti-armor weaponry. With these vehicles, the 82nd could scout ahead of the slower M4 Sherman tank with a top speed of 25 mph to 30 mph. Also used for reconnaissance and to run messages Harley-Davidson WLA motorcycles were used by the 82nd as well. Almost all units used Jeeps as they were fast four-wheel drive utility vehicles.

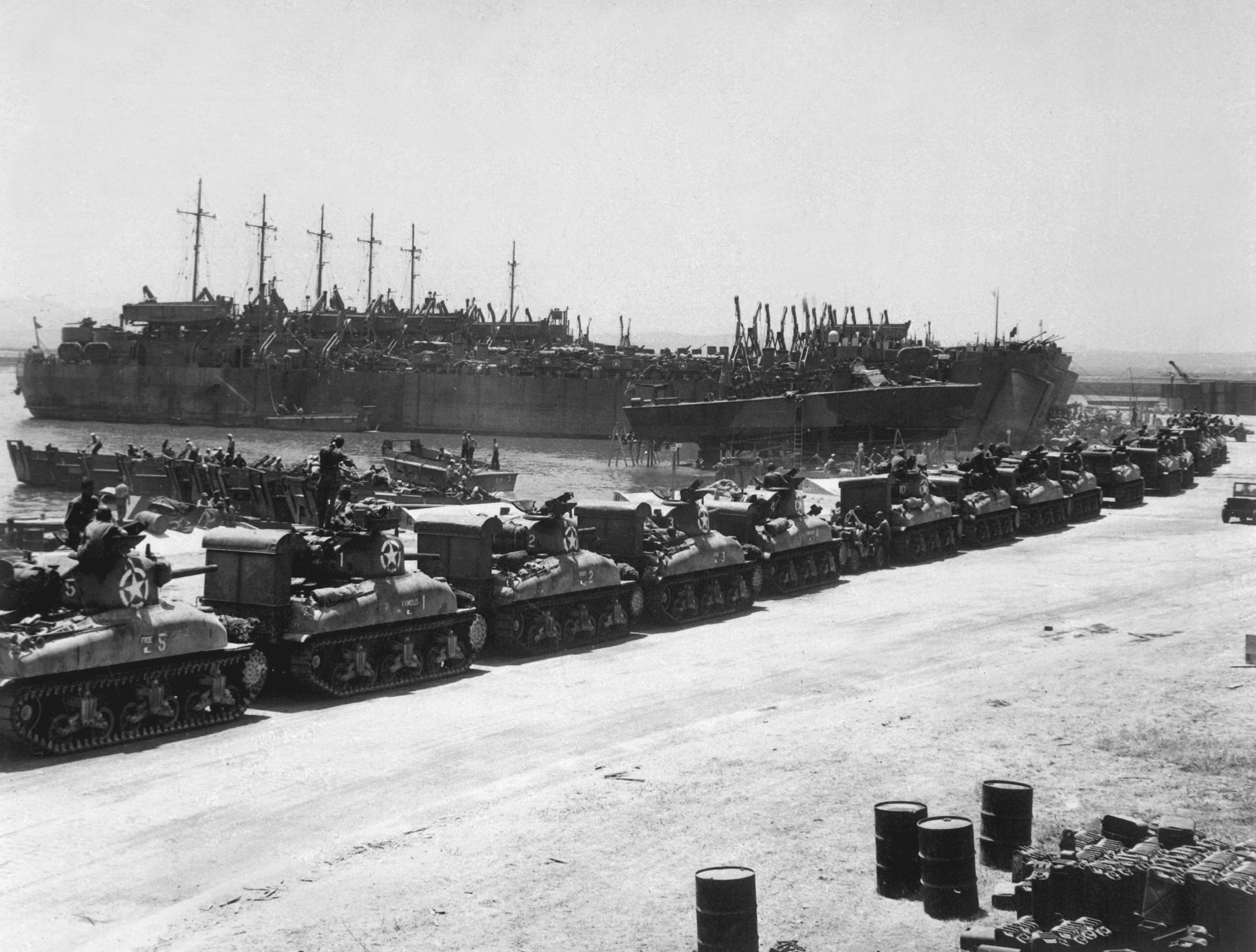
Waiting to load tanks and 82nd M8s in La Pècherie French base in French Tunisia.

=== North Africa ===
As part of the North African Campaign, three platoons of the 82nd were a part of the first landing in force in French North Africa's Tunisia which forced the surrendering. As part of Operation Torch and Operation Blackstone on November 8, 1942, one platoon of the 82nd landed at Safi, Morocco, and with Combat Command B another platoon landed at Fedala, near Casablanca, with the 9th Infantry Division and a third 82nd platoon landed at Mahdia Plage, near Port Lyautey, with the 3rd Infantry Division.

=== Sicily ===
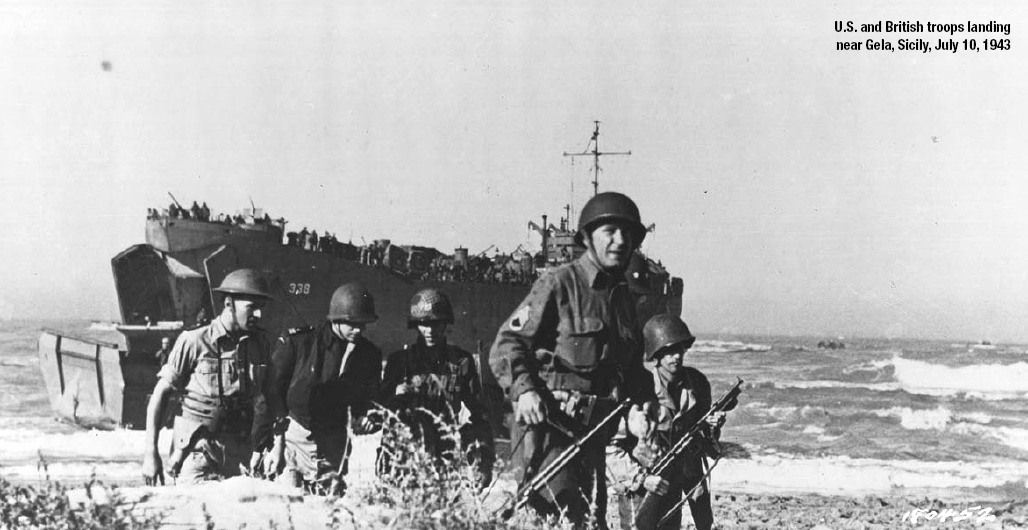
American and British troops landing near Gela, Sicily, July 10, 1943. The 82nd landed the next day.

As part of Operation Husky in the Sicily Campaign, the 82nd Armored Reconnaissance battalion played a big role in the capture of Butera when the battalion landed in Gela, Sicily in south-central Sicily, on July 11, 1943. While, the tank company also participated in the Battle of Mazzarino, then moving on to Palermo. After the liberation of Palermo it was a part of the Palermo Military District administering prisoners of war.

=== Omaha Beach to Berlin ===
On June 9, 1944, along with other battalions, the 82nd Battalion landed on Omaha Beach in Normandy as a part of Combat Command "A" as part of the Normandy landings and Operation Overlord. From Omaha Beach the battalion pushed through the Cherbourg peninsula and secured bridge across the Seine River. On August 16, 1944, near Mortain, France with Company "A", 2nd Platoon, the 82nd Reconnaissance helped link the Ninth U.S. Army with the 11th Armored Division, from the 3rd Army in the Ardennes.

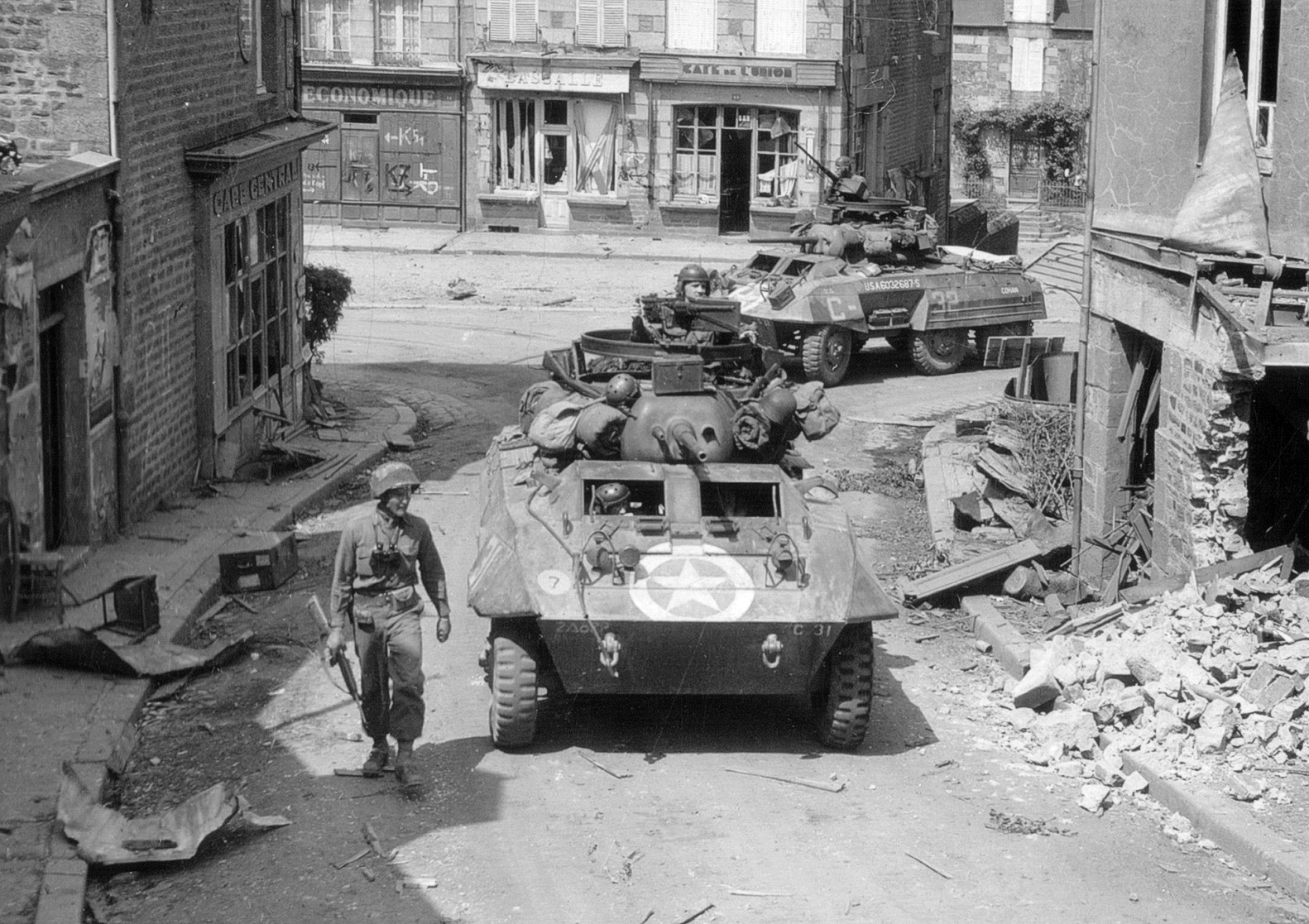
82nd Armored Reconnaissance Battalion in an M8.

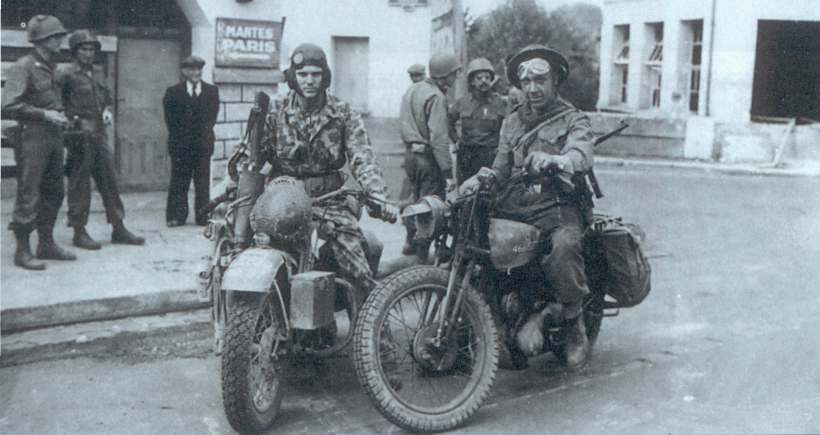
At Pacy-sur-Eure, France, American and British troops meet on August 27, 1944. In camouflage Cpl. Gordon C. Powell on a Harley-Davidson WLA, with the 82nd Armored Reconnaissance Battalion, poses next to British dispatch rider Baltins Dogoughs.

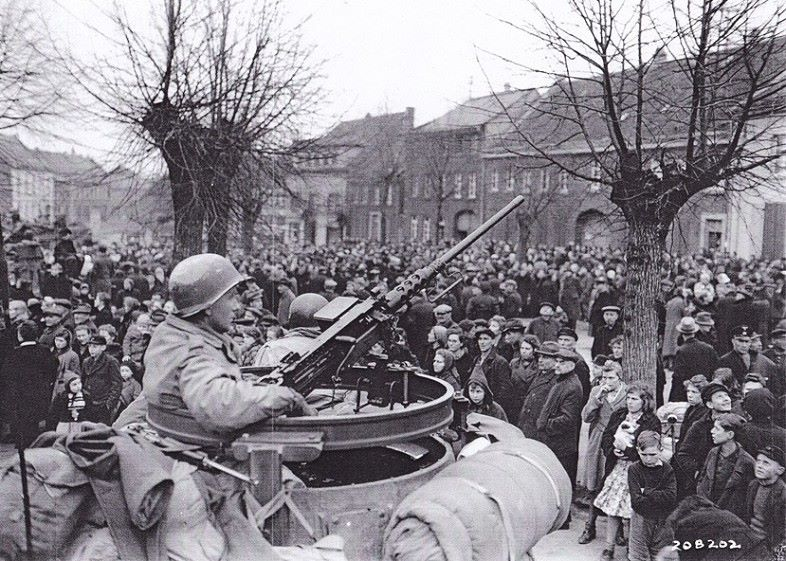
People of Jüchen assemble in the market place on 28 February 1945. A soldier of 82nd Armored Reconnaissance battalion watches from the turret of his M8 armored car.

Early September 1944 near Maastricht, Netherlands, the battalion crossed over the Maas (Meuse), near Sittard. On September 2, 1944, parts of the 82nd moved into neighbouring Belgium near Tournai. The battalion helped in the liberation of Born, Netherlands on Sept. 19, 1944. In Operation Queen and the Battle of the Bulge, the battalion helped near Gereonsweiler and near Houffalize. In September 1944 some of the 82nd recon patrols entered Belgium 12 hours before other American troops. From there the 82nd helped the Division move from the Rur (a tributary of the Meuse) to the Rhine. For bravery in the drive from April 3-17, 1945, from the Rhine through the Westphalia plains to the Elbe at Schönebeck, the 82nd Reconnaissance Battalion received the Presidential Unit Citation.

From May 7, 1945, to January 1, 1946, the 82nd Reconnaissance Battalion moved into occupation roles, including serving among the first U.S. forces to occupy Berlin.

=== Back to the U.S ===
On January 21, 1946, the battalion was shipped from Calais, France to Fort Hood, Texas, arriving February 12, 1946. The battalion was inactivated on November 22, 1946.

On January 17, 1949, the 82nd Reconnaissance Battalion was reactivated with new personal for tactical training in December 1949. On July 4, 1951, the battalion sailed out of New Orleans, Louisiana, arriving July 17, 1951, at Bremerhaven, Germany, for its second tour of duty in Germany, during the Cold War.

== Decorations and honors ==
- Presidential Unit Citation (U.S. Army version). Streamer embroidered Westphalia plains, 1945.
- Belgian fourragère (82d Armored Reconnaissance Battalion cited; 1950)
- Cited in the order of the day of the Belgian Army for action in Belgium.
- Cited in the order of the day of the Belgian Army for action in the Ardennes.
- In La Roche-en-Ardenne, Belgium is a memorial to the 82d Armored Reconnaissance Battalion. Four soldiers of the battalion are honored by name: John T. Graham, Everett. W. Christensen, Isaac Suhon and John McMahon.
- The 82nd Armored Reconnaissance Battalion was part of the 2nd Armored Division during World War II, contributing to the Division's overall recognition distinguished service and bravery. Soldiers of the overall 2nd Armored Division received 9,369 awards, including two medals of honor, twenty-three distinguished service crosses, 2,302 Silver Stars, about 6,000 Purple Hearts. In its 238 battle days, the 2nd Armored Division suffered 7,348 casualties, including 1,160 killed in action.

== Members ==
- Brigadier General Charles J. Girard was a platoon leader in the 82d early in World War II, and rose to the rank of major and overall battalion commander of the 82d by the end of that war.

== See also ==
- 17th Armored Engineer Battalion
