= William R. Bond =

United States Army general (1918–1970)

- Born: William Ross Bond; December 4, 1918; Portland, Maine, United States
- Died: April 1, 1970 (aged 51); Bình Thủy District, South Vietnam
- Burial place: Sedgwick Pie, Massachusetts, United States
- Military career
- Allegiance: United States
- Branch: United States Army
- Service years: 1940–1970
- Rank: Brigadier General
- Nickname: Billy
- Unit: Infantry Branch
- Commands: 199th Infantry Brigade
- Conflicts: World War II; Allied invasion of Sicily; Allied invasion of Italy; Battle of Salerno; Battle of Anzio; Battle of Cisterna; Korean War; Vietnam War †
- Awards: Distinguished Service Medal (2); Silver Star (2); Legion of Merit (2); Distinguished Flying Cross; Purple Heart; Air Medal (9); Prisoner of War Medal; Order of the Crown of Thailand (Knight Commander)

William Ross Bond (December 4, 1918 – April 1, 1970) was a brigadier general in the United States Army who commanded the 199th Infantry Brigade during the Vietnam War. He was killed in action by an enemy sniper in April 1970.

== Early life and education ==
William Ross Bond was raised in Maryland and Virginia. He graduated from the University of Maryland with a bachelor's degree in political science and history. He was also a graduate of the Army War College and other senior service schools.

== Military career ==
Bond enlisted in the Army in 1940. He served with A.co 1st Ranger BN and participated in the Allied invasion of Sicily and later led his company in the Salerno landings in September 1943. On January 22, 1944, Bond's unit landed at Anzio. In a night attack at Cisterna, Bond was awarded the Silver Star, but was captured by the Germans and was held in a prisoner of war camp in Poland.

Bond began his first tour in South Vietnam in 1959 as a part of the U.S. Military Assistance Advisory Group.

In 1966, he became Chief of Staff. In 1969 he was awarded the Distinguished Service Medal.

== Personal life ==
Bond married Theodora Sedgwick in 1960, a distant descendant of Union General John Sedgwick who was killed by a Confederate sharpshooter at the Battle of Spotsylvania Court House in 1864.

== Death ==
On April 1, 1970, during Operation Toan Thang IV, Bond was killed by a sniper's bullet shortly after landing in his command helicopter to oversee an operation in Bình Thủy District, 37 miles (60 km) north-northwest of Hàm Tân District.

His funeral was held at Arlington National Cemetery, after which he was buried in the Sedgwick Pie at the Stockbridge Cemetery in Stockbridge, Massachusetts.

== See also ==
U.S. Army general officers killed in action in the Vietnam War:

- George W. Casey Sr.
- John A. B. Dillard
- Richard J. Tallman
- Keith L. Ware
