= Honesdale High School =

Coordinates: 41.560°N 75.259°W

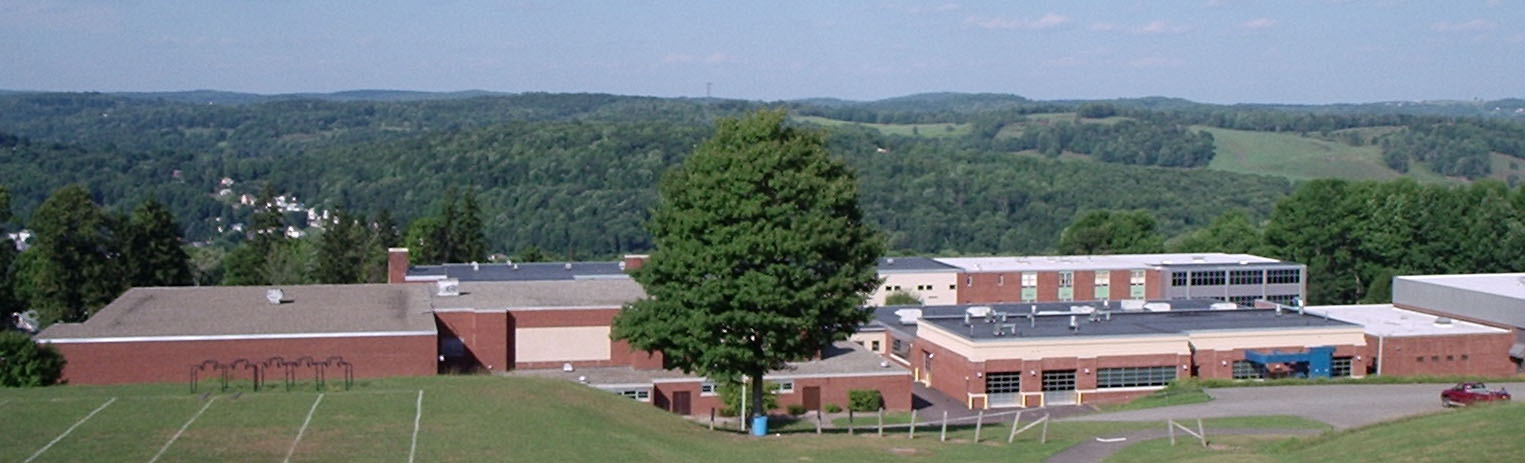

Location
- 459 Terrace St. Honesdale, PA 18431-1599; United States

Information
- Type: Public
- Established: April 6, 1959
- School district: Wayne Highlands
- Principal: Peter Jordan
- Teaching staff: 60.45 (on FTE basis)
- Grades: 9–12
- Enrollment: 692 (2023–2024)
- Student to teacher ratio: 11.45
- Campus: Rural
- Colors: Red and Black
- Nickname: Hornets
- Publication: Hornet Highlights
- Website: Official website

Honesdale High School is a public, four-year, regional high school serving grades 9–12 in Honesdale, Wayne County, Pennsylvania, United States, as a part of the Wayne Highlands School District. In the 2017–2018 school year, the School reported an enrollment of 838 pupils in grades 9th through 12th.

In 1831 the Honesdale Academy, which was a private preparatory school and the forerunner of the Honesdale High School, was founded. In 1875, the first class was graduated from a public high school in Honesdale. Honesdale’s first modern building constructed for school purposes was opened in 1909. In 1924, the consolidation of six political subdivisions formed the first union school district in Pennsylvania. On April 6, 1959 the present high school building was constructed. In 1970, under the School District Reorganization Act, the district was again expanded. The new name became the Wayne Highlands School District.

Honesdale High School is an accredited member of the Middle States Association of Colleges and Schools since 1940. The school is also accredited by the Pennsylvania Department of Education.

== Extracurriculars ==
Wayne Highlands School District offers a variety of clubs, activities and an extensive sports program.

=== Sports ===
The District funds:

Boys

- Baseball - AAA
- Basketball- AAA
- Cross Country - AA
- Football - AAA
- Golf - AAA
- Soccer - AA
- Tennis - AA
- Track and Field - AAA
- Wrestling - AAA

Girls

- Basketball - AAA
- Cross Country - AA
- Field Hockey - AAA
- Soccer (Fall) - AA
- Softball - AAA
- Girls' Tennis - AA
- Track and Field - AAA

Honesdale High School has a long history of athletic success, most notably in cross-country, wrestling, track and field, golf, and more recently boys and girls soccer. Honesdale High School football has had a notable decline in the past years and is facing their third losing season in a row.

== Notable staff and alumni ==
- Lyman Louis Lemnitzer, class of 1917, was a former Chairman of the Joint Chiefs of Staff.
- Art Wall, Jr., golfer and 1959 Masters Tournament champion was born and lived in Honesdale.
- Richard J. Tallman, class of 1943, was a U.S. Army Brigadier General killed in action in Vietnam in 1972

== See also ==
- Honesdale, Pennsylvania
- List of high schools in Pennsylvania
