= Carroll Edward Adams =

United States Army general

- Born: June 7, 1923; Pawtucket, Rhode Island, U.S.
- Died: May 12, 1970 (aged 46) Pleiku Province, South Vietnam
- Buried: United States Military Academy Post Cemetery
- Branch: Corps of Engineers
- Rank: Brigadier General

Carroll Edward Adams Jr. (June 7, 1923 – May 12, 1970) was an American brigadier general who was one of the highest-ranked American military officers killed during the Vietnam War. He was the commander of 937th Engineer Group. Adams was killed in the same UH-1 helicopter crash as Major General John A. B. Dillard.

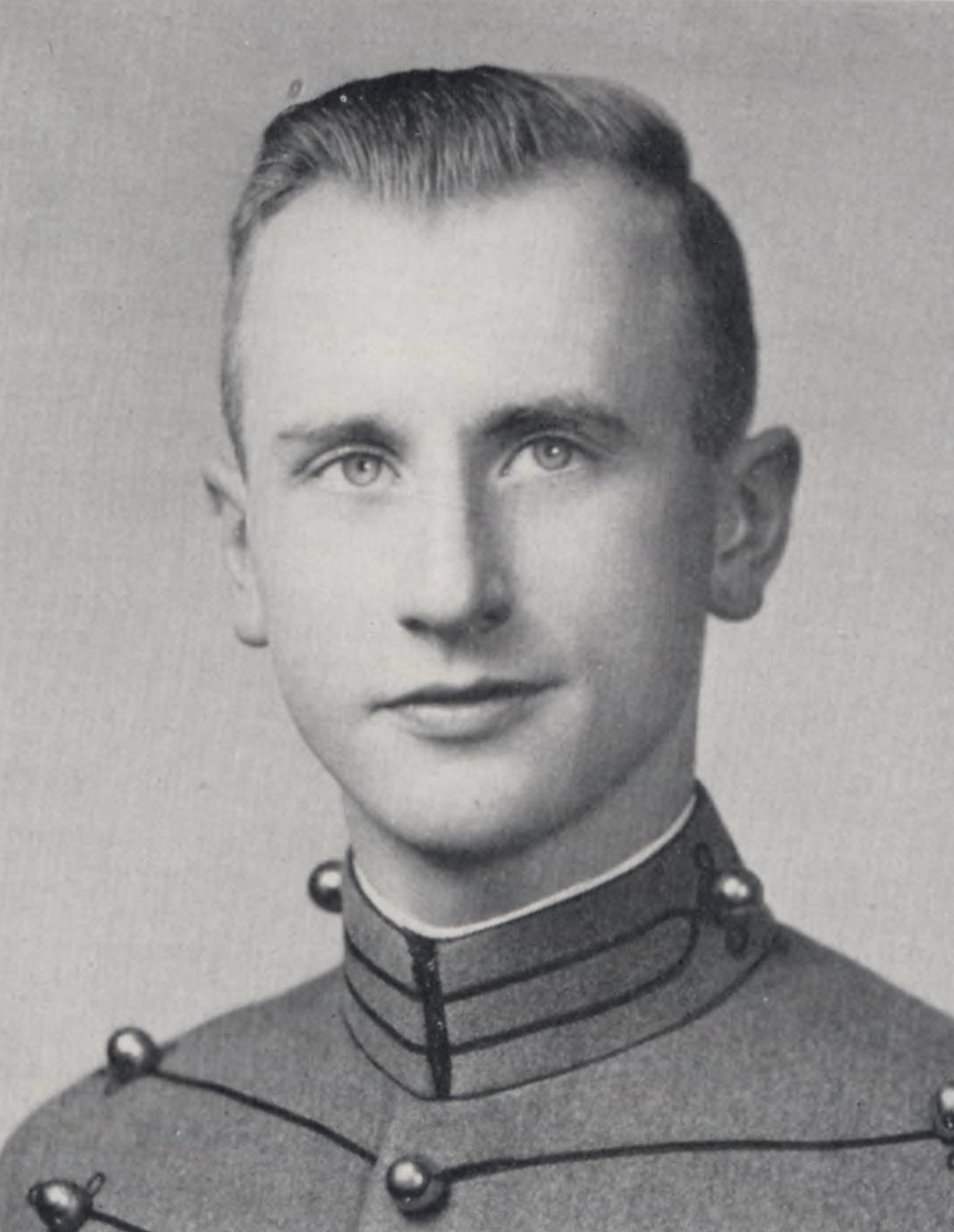
Adams as a United States Military Academy cadet c. 1945
