= Keith L. Ware =

United States Army general

Keith Lincoln Ware
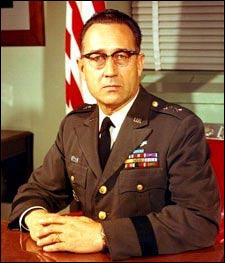
- Major General Keith L. Ware
- Born: 23 November 1915; Denver, Colorado, U.S.
- Died: 13 September 1968 (aged 52); Lộc Ninh, Binh Phuoc Province, South Vietnam
- Burial place: Arlington National Cemetery
- Military career
- Allegiance: United States
- Branch: United States Army
- Service years: 1941–1968
- Rank: Major General
- Commands: 1st Infantry Division; 3rd Infantry Division; 1st Battalion, 15th Infantry Regiment
- Conflicts: World War II; Vietnam War: Battle of Lộc Ninh †
- Awards: Medal of Honor; Distinguished Service Cross; Army Distinguished Service Medal (2); Silver Star; Bronze Star Medal; Purple Heart (3)

Keith Lincoln Ware (23 November 1915 – 13 September 1968) was a United States Army major general, and a Medal of Honor recipient of World War II. Ware was killed in action in 1968 while commanding the 1st Infantry Division during the Vietnam War.

== Early life and education ==
Ware was born in Denver, Colorado on 23 November 1915. He graduated from South High School and worked at a variety of jobs to help support his family.

== Military career ==
=== World War II ===
Ware was drafted into the United States Army in July 1941. He was sent to Officer Candidate School in 1942, emerging a platoon leader stationed at Fort Ord, California. He saw extensive service in the European Theater of Operations during World War II, rose to the rank of lieutenant colonel by December 1944, and was appointed to command the 1st Battalion, 15th Infantry Regiment, 3rd Infantry Division.

On 26 December 1944, Ware's battalion was attacking a heavily fortified German hilltop position. Finding one of his assault companies stalled and digging in under heavy fire, Ware went forward and made a close reconnaissance of the German positions, deliberately drawing their fire in order to determine their location. After two hours, he returned to the company and organized a small force of eleven men including two officers and a tank in order to renew the attack. Leading the advance, he personally assaulted four enemy machine guns, enabling the tank and the rest of his detachment to destroy the German position. Ware was wounded, and five soldiers of his group were killed before the hill was secured. In April 1945, he was awarded the Medal of Honor for his heroism.

=== Interbellum ===
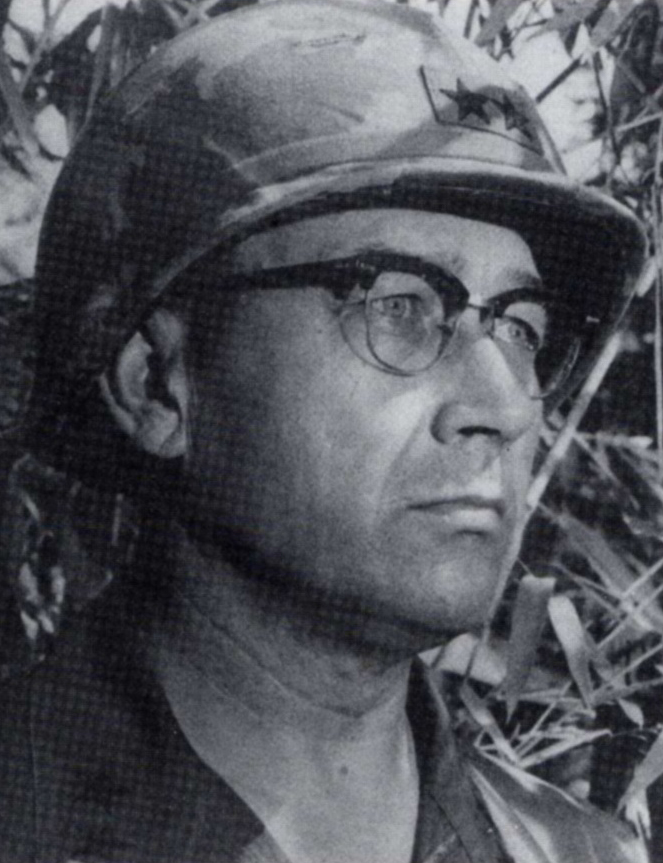
Major General Ware

Unlike most draftees, Ware remained in the army after demobilization, becoming a career soldier and one of the first former draftees to reach general officer rank.

Ware remained in Europe and took part in the post-war occupation of Germany. He then attended the United States Army Command and General Staff College, after which he was assigned to the Military District of Washington. During this assignment he met his future wife, Joyce; they were married in May 1947.

Ware attended the European Staff Officers' Course at Columbia University, and then studied at George Washington University in preparation for a teaching assignment. Ware was then assigned to the United States Military Academy as an instructor in psychology and leadership, after which he attended the Armed Forces Staff College.

After a posting in South Korea from 1955 to 1957, Ware attended the National War College. He then served as an army congressional liaison and completed an assignment in Europe. In 1963 Ware was assigned as assistant division commander of the 2nd Armored Division at Fort Hood, Texas, and was promoted to brigadier general. From 1964 to 1967 Ware was the army's deputy chief of information and then chief of information. In 1966 he was promoted to major general.

=== Vietnam War ===
Ware volunteered for service in Vietnam and arrived in South Vietnam in early 1968, serving as the deputy commander of II Field Force. On the morning of 31 January 1968, at the start of the Tet Offensive, II Field Force commander Lieutenant General Frederick C. Weyand directed Ware to establish a tactical command post at Camp Lê Văn Duyệt, next to the Army of the Republic of Vietnam's Capital Military District headquarters. Once operational this headquarters, known as Hurricane Forward, would assume tactical control over all United States units entering the Saigon–Gia Định Province zone. Following this, Ware was assigned to command the 1st Infantry Division in March 1968.

==== Death ====
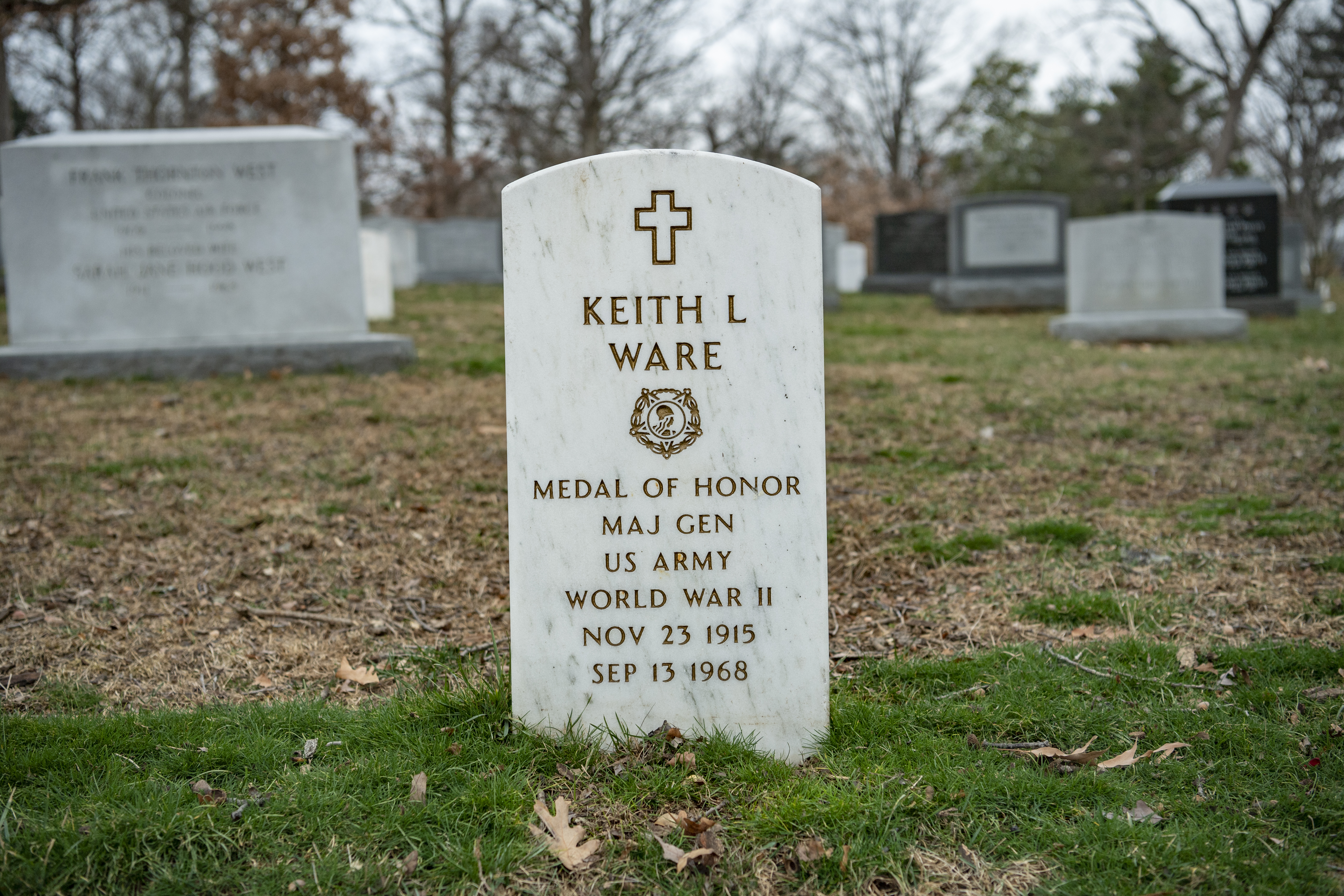
Grave at Arlington National Cemetery

On 13 September 1968, during the Battle of Lộc Ninh, elements of the 1st Infantry Division were preparing to attack Hill 222 (11.888°N 106.629°E), 6 km north of the town. Ware's command group were flying in his command and control helicopter to view the battle when heavy anti-aircraft fire brought the helicopter down 5 km south of Lộc Ninh. Ware, his three command staff, and the four helicopter crew were all killed in the crash. One account states that Communist forces used a captured American radio to lure Ware's helicopter into an ambush. Ware was the second United States Army general officer to die in the Vietnam War, after Brigadier General Alfred Judson Force Moody died of a heart attack in South Vietnam on 19 March 1967. On 25 October 1968, Ware was posthumously awarded the Distinguished Service Cross.

Ware is buried at Arlington National Cemetery.

== Legacy ==
- The U.S. Army's annual Awards for Journalism are named for him.
- Ware Elementary School in Fort Riley, Kansas
- Ware Hall, 1-15 IN battalion command post at Fort Benning
- Ware Hall, the Kelley Hill Education Center (building 9004) at Fort Benning, Georgia.
- Ware Hall, a lodging facility at Fort Cavazos, Texas
- A parade field at Fort Riley, Kansas
- A shooting range at Fort Benning, Georgia
- Maj. Gen. Keith L. Ware Post 100, Colorado, Scottish-American Military Society (SAMS)

Ware's name is inscribed on the Vietnam War Memorial ("The Wall") on panel 44W.

== Military awards ==
Ware's military decorations and awards include:

Combat Infantryman Badge
Medal of Honor	Distinguished Service Cross	Army Distinguished Service Medal w/ Bronze Oak Leaf Cluster
Silver Star	Bronze Star Medal	Purple Heart w/ two Bronze Oak Leaf Clusters
American Defense Service Medal	American Campaign Medal	European-African-Middle Eastern Campaign Medal w/ Arrowhead Device and two 3/16" Bronze Stars
World War II Victory Medal	Army of Occupation Medal w/ "Germany" clasp	National Defense Service Medal w/ 3/16" Bronze Star
Vietnam Service Medal w/ two 3/16" Bronze Stars	French Croix de Guerre w/ Gold Star	Republic of Vietnam Campaign Medal w/ 1960- Device

Army Presidential Unit Citation	Republic of Vietnam Gallantry Cross Unit Citation w/ Palm

=== Medal of Honor citation ===
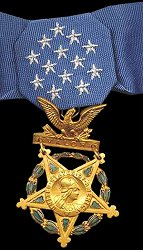
Medal of Honor

The President of the United States in the name of The Congress takes pleasure in presenting the MEDAL OF HONOR to

LIEUTENANT COLONEL KEITH LINCOLN WARE
UNITED STATES ARMY

for service as set forth in the following

CITATION:

Commanding the 1st Battalion, 15th Infantry, attacking a strongly held enemy position on a hill near Sigolsheim, France, on 26 December 1944, found that 1 of his assault companies had been stopped and forced to dig in by a concentration of enemy artillery, mortar, and machinegun fire. The company had suffered casualties in attempting to take the hill. Realizing that his men must be inspired to new courage, Lt. Col. Ware went forward 150 yards beyond the most forward elements of his command, and for 2 hours reconnoitered the enemy positions, deliberately drawing fire upon himself which caused the enemy to disclose his dispositions. Returning to his company, he armed himself with an automatic rifle and boldly advanced upon the enemy, followed by 2 officers, 9 enlisted men, and a tank. Approaching an enemy machinegun, Lt. Col. Ware shot 2 German riflemen and fired tracers into the emplacement, indicating its position to his tank, which promptly knocked the gun out of action. Lt. Col. Ware turned his attention to a second machinegun, killing 2 of its supporting riflemen and forcing the others to surrender. The tank destroyed the gun. Having expended the ammunition for the automatic rifle, Lt. Col. Ware took up an M-1 rifle, killed a German rifleman, and fired upon a third machinegun 50 yards away. His tank silenced the gun. Upon his approach to a fourth machinegun, its supporting riflemen surrendered and his tank disposed of the gun. During this action Lt. Col. Ware's small assault group was fully engaged in attacking enemy positions that were not receiving his direct and personal attention. Five of his party of 11 were casualties and Lt. Col. Ware was wounded but refused medical attention until this important hill position was cleared of the enemy and securely occupied by his command.

== See also ==
- List of Medal of Honor recipients for World War II
