= Alfred Judson Force Moody =

United States Army general

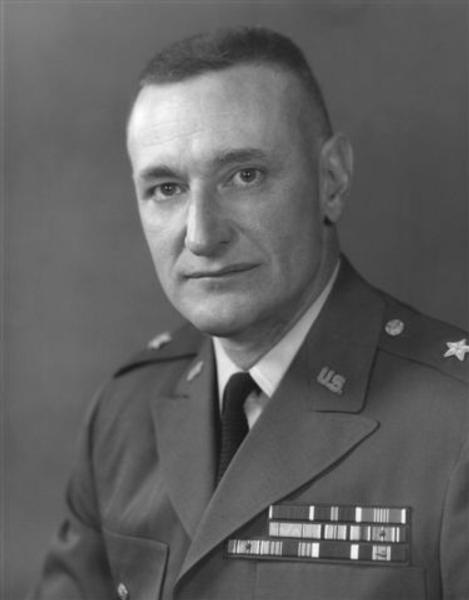
- Born: 4 March 1918; New Haven, Connecticut, U.S.
- Died: 19 March 1967 (aged 49); Camp Radcliff, An Khe, Vietnam
- Burial place: Arlington National Cemetery
- Military career
- Allegiance: United States
- Branch: United States Army
- Service years: 1941–1967
- Rank: Brigadier General
- Conflicts: World War II; Vietnam War
- Awards: Army Distinguished Service Medal; Legion of Merit (3); Bronze Star Medal; Air Medal (7); Army Commendation Medal; Purple Heart

Brigadier General Alfred Judson Force Moody (4 March 1918 – 19 March 1967) was a United States Army officer who served with SHAEF during World War II, and as the Assistant Division Commander of the 1st Cavalry Division during the Vietnam War.

A 1941 graduate of the United States Military Academy at West Point, ranking first in his class, Moody served as a staff officer with the Operations Division (OPD) of the War Department General Staff, in the China-Burma-India Theater, and with Central Pacific Base Command and the 7th Infantry Division on Okinawa.

After duty as the Military Assistant to Robert McNamara, the Secretary of Defense, he learned to fly helicopters, and he was appointed the Assistant Division Commander of the 1st Cavalry Division. Just a week after he arrived in South Vietnam, he died of a heart attack.

== Early life ==
Alfred Judson Force Moody was born in New Haven, Connecticut, on 4 March 1918, the son of Ilna Force and Wilfred Hamilton Moody. He had a sister, Ilna. He joined the Army and was posted to Fort H. G. Wright, and then to the area prep school at Fort Preble, Maine. He was accepted into the United States Military Academy at West Point, which he entered on 1 July 1937. The West Point Yearbook noted that he "came to West Point from the Army with a determination to do his best in whatever he attempted. We can see from his record that his best was exceptional."

Moody was ranked first in his class, which graduated and was commissioned as second lieutenants on 1 July 1941. Traditionally, the highest ranked graduates in the class joined the United States Army Corps of Engineers, but Moody chose to join the cavalry instead. He married Jean Enwright, whom he had known since childhood. They had four daughters, all with names starting with the letter J: Judith, Jean, Joan, and Joy.

== World War II ==
On 1 August 1941, he assumed command of a platoon in Troop F, 14th Cavalry at Fort Riley, Kansas. He attended the United States Army Cavalry School from 3 October to 23 December 1941, shortly after the United States entered World War II, and was a platoon commander in Troop E, 6th Cavalry from 20 January to 15 May 1942. He returned to West Point as an instructor in Chemical and Electrical Engineering, where he was promoted to first lieutenant on 15 June 1942, captain on 15 December 1942, and major on 4 January 1944.

In May 1944, Moody was posted to the European Theater of Operations, where he served on the staff of SHAEF until 14 September 1944. He then returned to the United States, where he saw duty in Washington, D.C., with the Operations Division (OPD) of the War Department General Staff and in the China-Burma-India Theater. After attending the Command and General Staff School at Fort Leavenworth, Kansas, from 8 January to 6 March 1945, he was posted to the Cavalry Replacement Training Center at Fort Riley, and then, on 9 July 1945, to the staff of the Central Pacific Base Command on Okinawa. On 15 August 1945, he became Assistant Chief of Staff (G-3) of the 7th Infantry Division, then also based on Okinawa, but which subsequently participated in the United States occupation of Korea after the war ended. He was promoted to lieutenant colonel on 15 March 1946, and was awarded the Bronze Star Medal for his services.

== Later life ==
Moody's appointment as a lieutenant colonel in the Army of the United States was terminated on 31 May 1946, and he reverted to his substantive rank of first lieutenant in the cavalry. He became an instructor at Fort Knox, Kentucky, on 14 June 1947, and became a captain again on 1 July 1948. He attended Yale University, where he earned a Master of Arts degree in international relations in 1950. He was then posted back to The Pentagon for duty in the Office of the Chief of Staff of the Army. This was followed by a posting to the headquarters of the United States European Command in Paris, and then a tour as a tank battalion commander in Germany. In due course he returned to Fort Carson, Colorado. After graduating from the United States Army War College, he returned to the Office of the Chief of Staff of the Army, and then was posted to Korea, where he commanded a brigade.

The tour of command in Korea was cut short, and Moody returned to the United States for duty as the Military Assistant to Robert McNamara, the Secretary of Defense. He was promoted to brigadier general in July 1966. After learning how to fly helicopters at Fort Rucker, Alabama, he was appointed the Assistant Division Commander of the 1st Cavalry Division, then engaged in combat in Vietnam during the Vietnam War in March 1967.

Moody took up his new posting at the Camp Radcliff, in An Khe, Vietnam, but on 19 March 1967, just a week after he arrived, he said he was not feeling well, and asked for a doctor to be sent to his quarters. He died of a heart attack shortly after the doctor arrived. He was survived by his father, and his wife and four daughters. His body was returned to the United States, and he was buried in Arlington National Cemetery on 24 March 1967 with full military honors. His name was subsequently inscribed on the wall of the Vietnam Veterans Memorial in Washington, DC. His decorations included the Distinguished Service Medal, the Legion of Merit with two oak leaf clusters, the Bronze Star Medal, the Air Medal with six oak leaf clusters, Army Commendation Medal, and the Purple Heart.
