= University of Santo Tomas =

Private university in Metro Manila, Philippines

Pontifical and Royal University of Santo Tomas, The Catholic University of the Philippines
- Unibersidad ng Santo Tomas (Filipino)
- Seal
- Latin: Pontificia et Regalis Sancti Thomae Aquinatis Universitas Manilana Universitas Catholica Philippinarum
- Other name: UST or USTe
- Former name: See list
- Motto: Veritas in Caritate
- Motto in English: Truth in Charity
- Type: Private non-profit research university
- Established: April 28, 1611; 415 years ago
- Founder: Miguel de Benavides
- Religious affiliation: Catholic Church (Dominican)
- Academic affiliations: AIMS; EU-SHARE; AUPF; ASAIHL; ASEACCU; IAU; ICUSTA; IFCU; AUAP; UMAP; Cumulus; ACCA; SEAMEO- INNOTECH
- Chancellor: Gerard Timoner III
- Vice-Chancellor: Filemón de la Cruz Jr.
- Rector: Richard Ang
- Secretary-General: Louie Coronel
- Faculty: 2,164 (2019)
- Students: 45,731 basic education, undergraduate and graduate (first term of A.Y. 2026–2027)
- Location: España Boulevard, Sampaloc, Manila, Philippines; 14°36′35″N 120°59′23″E
- Campus: Urban 21.5 hectares (215,000 m^{2})
- Newspaper: The Varsitarian
- Patron saints: Thomas Aquinas, Catherine of Alexandria
- Colors: Gold, black, and white
- Nickname: Growling Tigers
- Sporting affiliations: UAAP
- Mascot: Bengal Tiger
- Student moniker: Thomasian (English), Tomasino (Filipino)
- Acceptance Rate: ~30%
- Website: www.ust.edu.ph

University of Santo Tomas Hymn
- University of Santo Tomas singers: file; help
- Location in Manila Location in Metro Manila Location in Luzon Location in the Philippines

The University of Santo Tomas (UST; Filipino: Unibersidad ng Santo Tomás), officially the Pontifical and Royal University of Santo Tomas, The Catholic University of the Philippines or colloquially as Ustê (pronounced [usˈtɛʔ]), is a private Catholic research university in Manila, Philippines. Founded on April 28, 1611, by Spanish friar Miguel de Benavides, third Archbishop of Manila, it has the oldest extant university charter in Asia and is one of the world's largest Catholic universities in terms of enrollment found on one campus. It is the main campus of the University of Santo Tomas System that is run by the Order of Preachers.

UST was granted the title Royal by King Charles III of Spain in 1785. Pope Leo XIII made UST a pontifical university in 1902. Pope Pius XII bestowed the title of The Catholic University of the Philippines in 1947. The university houses the first and oldest engineering, law, medical, and pharmacy schools in the country. The main campus is the largest university in the city of Manila and is home to 22 degree-granting colleges, a parish church, and a teaching hospital. The National Museum of the Philippines declared four of the university's structures and the UST Baybayin Documents as National Cultural Treasures.

The university offers programs in over 180 undergraduate and graduate specializations. It has 26 programs recognized by the Commission on Higher Education (CHED) as Centers of Excellence and Centers of Development. It is awarded institutional accreditation by the CHED through the Federation of Accrediting Agencies of the Philippines (FAAP). The university has the highest number of Philippine Association of Colleges and Universities' Commission on Accreditation (PACUCOA)-accredited programs in the country, with 59. UST alumni and faculty include 30 Catholic saints, four presidents of the Philippines, 17 senators, nine chief justices, 22 national artists, a national scientist, and five billionaires. The athletic teams are the Growling Tigers, who are members of the University Athletic Association of the Philippines and have won the overall championships more than any other university.

== History ==
The foundation of the university is attributed to the Spanish friar Miguel de Benavides. He came to the Philippines with the first Dominican mission in 1587. He went on to become bishop of Nueva Segovia and was promoted to become the third archbishop of Manila in 1602. Upon his death on July 26, 1605, Benavides bequeathed his library and personal property worth ₱1,500 to be used as the seed fund for the establishment of an institution of higher learning. Two days before, he made a testament in the presence of Dominican priests Domingo de Nieva and Bernardo de Santa Catalina, who were the executors of his last will. In June 1606, Nueva Segovia bishop Diego de Soria wrote a letter to King Philip III of Spain informing him of the plans of founding a colegio. He also added that the colegio be given authorization to grant academic degrees similar to those of the Colegio de Santo Tomás in Avila, Spain.

In 1609, permission to open the college was requested from King Philip III of Spain, which only reached Manila two years later. The university was founded on April 28, 1611. The act of foundation was signed by frays Baltasar Fort, Bernardo Navarro, and Francisco Minayo. Bernardo de Santa Catalina carried out the wishes of Benavides and was able to secure a building near the Dominican church and convent in the walled city of Intramuros in Manila for the college. The authorities took the example of universities in Spain, such as the University of Salamanca, and in Spanish America, such as the Royal and Pontifical University of Mexico, to become a model for the university. UST was first called the College of Our Lady of the Most Holy Rosary (Colegio de Nuestra Señora del Santísimo Rosario), and in 1619, it was renamed Colegio de Santo Tomas in honor of the Dominican theologian, St. Thomas Aquinas. On November 20, 1645, Pope Innocent X issued the papal bull In Supereminenti, which elevated the Colegio de Santo Tomás to a university and placed it under papal authority.

Following the royal decree of King Philip V of Spain in 1733 and bull Dudum emanarunt of Pope Clement XII in 1734, the Faculty of Canon Law (Facultad de Cánones) and the Faculty of Civil Law (Facultad de Derecho) were established.

The Royal Decree of May 20, 1865, from Queen Isabella II of Spain gave power to UST for the supervision of all secondary schools. Being the only institution of higher learning at that time, UST acted as the Department of Education of the country. After five years, the Minister of Overseas Colonies Segismundo Moret issued a decree that converted Real y Pontificia Universidad de Santo Tomás into Real y Pontificia Universidad de Filipinas. In 1871, the Superior Gobierno de Filipinas issued a decree that established the Faculty of Medicine and Pharmacy (Facultad de Medicina y Farmacia). UST was allowed to grant a licentiate degree in medicine. From 1877 to 1901, 329 students were granted the licentiate degree. José Rizal studied medicine at the university from 1878 to 1882, where he was granted the rare privilege of studying simultaneously the preparatory course of medicine and the first year of medicine. The university began granting the degree of Doctor of Medicine in 1902 during the new American system.

The university was registered on January 13, 1908, as a non-stock, non-profit educational institution under Act 1459 with the corporate name of Real y Pontificia Universidad de Santo Tomás de Manila. With the growing student population, the Dominicans were given a 21.5-hectare plot of land at the Sulucan Hills in Sampaloc, Manila and built its new campus. In 1924, it began accepting female enrollees. All courses and departments moved to the new campus, with the exception of medicine and civil law, both of which remained in Intramuros.

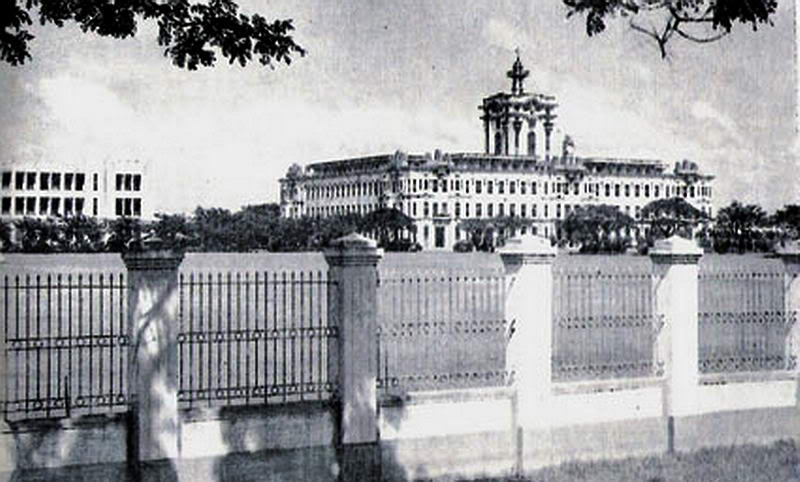
The UST Main Building and the Central Seminary building in the 1940s

During World War II, the Imperial Japanese forces converted UST into an internment camp for enemy aliens, mostly Americans living in the Philippines. Their secret police division, known as Kenpeitai, turned the original Intramuros campus into a garrison and torture chamber, destroying it by fire in 1944. Over 3,700 internees were freed, 2,870 of whom were Americans, and over 600 were either killed or died from sickness or starvation in the internment camp for 37 months from January 1942 until February 11, 1945, when the camp was liberated by General Douglas MacArthur.

UST was given the title "Royal" by King Charles III of Spain in 1785, in recognition of the university's loyalty in defending Manila against the British troops. In 1974, then prince King Juan Carlos I of Spain visited UST and was conferred doctor of laws honoris causa and the title Royal Patron, as a revival of the tradition dating back to 1680 when King Charles II of Spain was named the first patron. Queen Sofía of Spain, who visited with her husband in 1974, came back in 2012.

In 1902, UST was officially declared a pontifical university by the Quae Mari Sinico, an apostolic constitution signed by Pope Leo XIII. As a pontifical university, UST has been visited by the pope four times since 1970, Pope Paul VI in 1970, Pope John Paul II in 1981 and 1995, and by Pope Francis in 2015. During the quadricentennial year in 2011, Pope Benedict XVI sent a special envoy and gave a video message. In 1947, Pope Pius XII bestowed the appellate name The Catholic University of the Philippines.

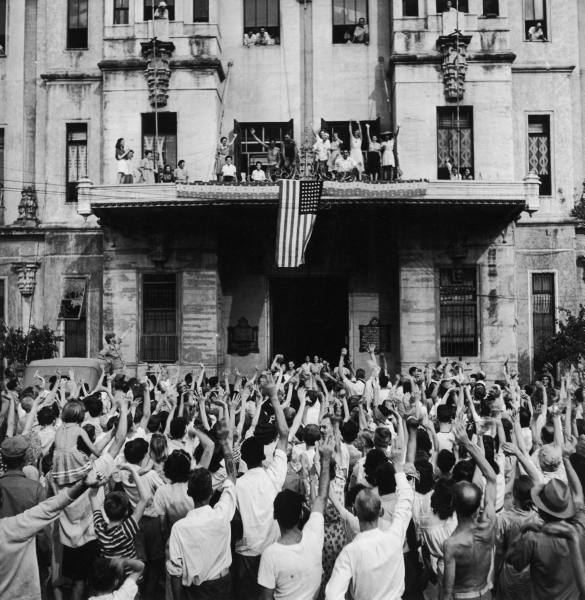
The liberation of internees in front of the UST Main Building by the Americans in February 1945

UST's first Filipino rector was Leonardo Legaspi, who served UST from 1971 to 1977. At the onset of martial law in the Philippines in 1972, he issued guidelines from a Department Order about the Marcos martial law and sought the help of the faculty members for the maintenance of discipline imposed by the government. The Varsitarian continued to operate during martial law, even when several national newspapers were shut down. The UST administration cautioned The Varsitarian against publishing anti-government sentiments, but the publication still urged the students to resist the dictatorship. The student council from the Faculty of Arts and Letters became the first legitimate student government in the country since martial law was declared.

UST's recognition as the oldest extant university in the Philippines was disputed by the University of San Carlos. Since its establishment, the UST's academic life has been interrupted only twice; from 1898 to 1899, during the Philippine Revolution against Spain, and from 1942 to 1945, during the Japanese occupation of the country. On December 1, 2010, the House of Representatives passed Resolution No. 51, "Resolution Congratulating the University of Santo Tomas on the occasion of its Quadricentennial Anniversary in 2011," which read "founded on April 28, 1611, by Archbishop Miguel de Benavides" and "has the oldest extant university charter in the Philippines and Asia."

In the first term of 2026–2027, 45,731 students enrolled in the university. There were 38,463 students in the undergraduate and graduate programs, while 7,268 were enrolled in the basic education units (education high school, education senior high school, UST high school and UST senior high school).

=== Seal ===
The oldest seal used by the university is first seen in an examination book Libros de piques that is found in the UST Archives.

The current seal features a modern French shield quartered by the Dominican Cross. At its center lies the sun of St. Thomas Aquinas, surrounded by four distinct symbols on a field of light blue to honor the Marian color: the papal tiara, signifying the university’s status as a pontifical institution; the lion rampant from the coat of arms of Spain; the sea-lion from the seal of Manila; and the rose vignette symbolizing the patronage of the Blessed Virgin Mary. The surrounding inscription bears the full name of UST, Pontifical and Royal University of Santo Tomas, Manila and its foundation year, 1611. The colors, as officially defined by the university's identity guidelines, define the gold and blue as Pantone 213 C and Pantone 298 C, respectively.

== Campus ==
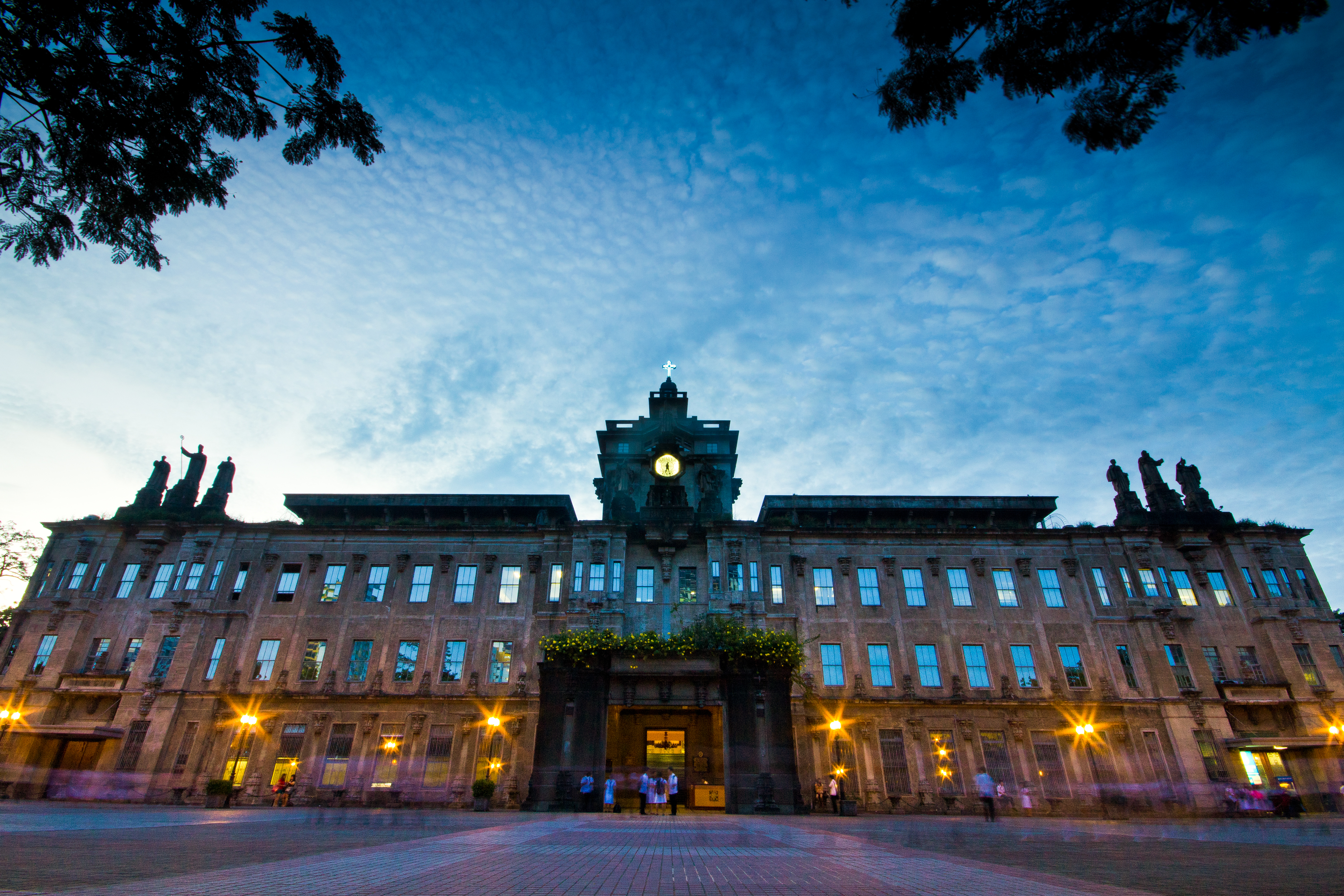
The UST Main Building is the first earthquake-resistant building in Asia.

The UST main campus is the largest university in the city of Manila. Located on España Boulevard in the Sampaloc district, it is spread over an almost perfect square of 21.5 hectares. The university is part of the University Belt. In 1927, the university transferred to its present campus when the Dominicans deemed the Intramuros campus inadequate for the university's growing population.

The architectural style of buildings within the campus is influenced by the construction period, resulting in a significant variation. The designs of early structures are done by university priests and professors who used styles from the Renaissance Revival, Art Deco, Bauhaus, to International Style. The Sampaloc campus saw an extensive redevelopment at the turn of the century as 12 out of the 24 major buildings were constructed from 2002 to 2023. Several buildings, such as the Beato Angelico Building, the Thomas Aquinas Research Complex, and the hospital buildings, have adopted the capital and column of the UST Main Building, one of the university's iconic symbols. Seven buildings are also named after beatified Dominicans and Dominican saints. (Note: The list includes Thomas Aquinas Research Complex, Albertus Magnus Building, San Martin de Porres Building, St. Raymund de Peñafort Building, Beato Angelico Building, Buenaventura Garcia Paredes, O.P. Building, and Saint Pier Giorgio Frassati Building.)

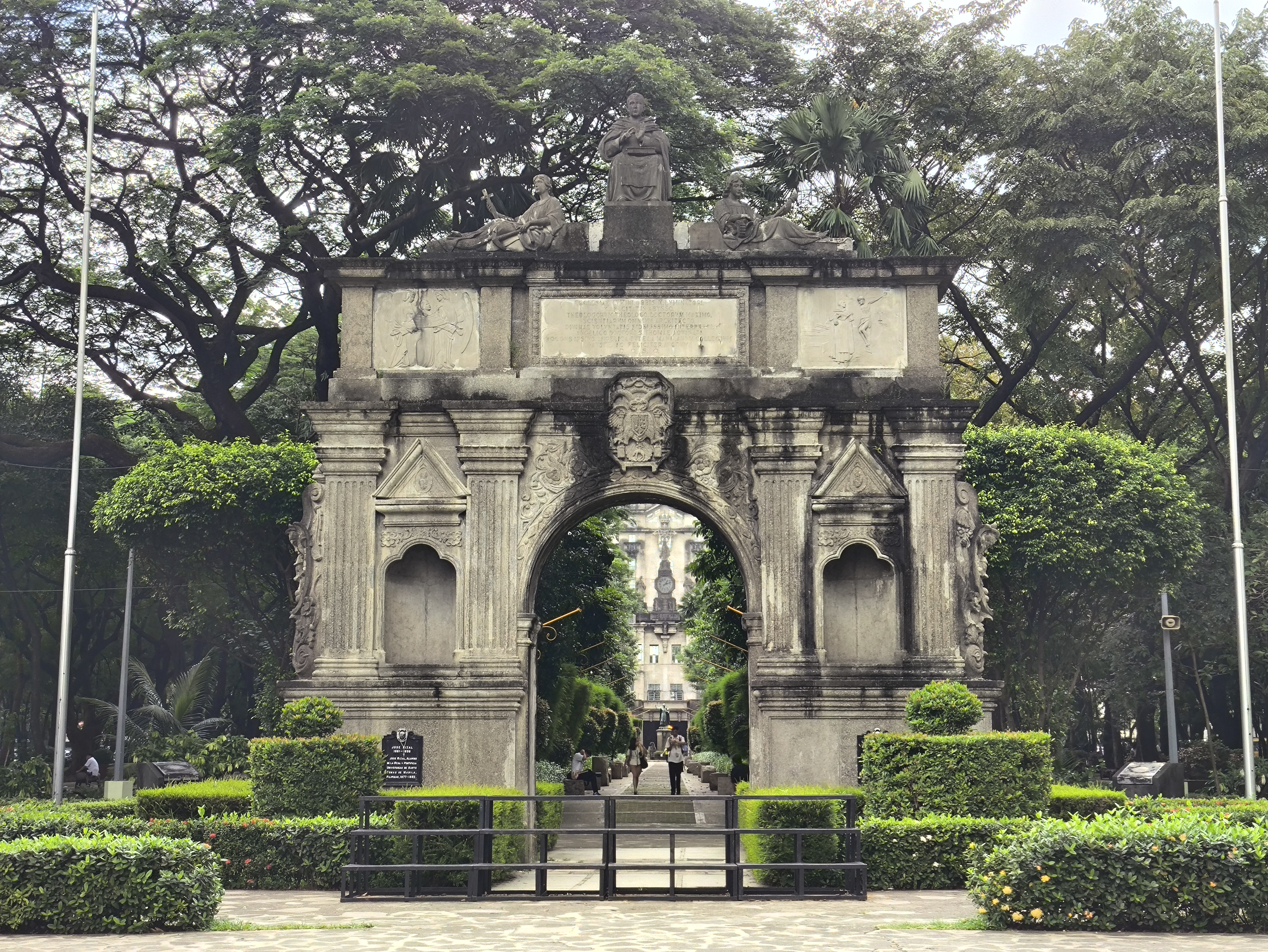
The Arch of the Centuries was declared as a National Cultural Treasure by the National Museum on January 25, 2010.

The central axis of the campus comprises the Arch of the Centuries, the Plaza Benavides, the Benavides Monument, the Main Building, the Quadricentennial Square, the Miguel de Benavides Library, the Tan Yan Kee Student Center, and the upcoming Henry Sy Sr. Hall. Erected around 1680, the Arch of the Centuries served as the main entrance to the first campus in Intramuros. It transferred to its present site in 1954. The Main Building, designed by the priest and engineer Roque Ruaño, was built from 1924 to 1927. It is the first structure on the campus and once served as the Kilometer Zero of Manila. It houses the Faculty of Civil Law, the Faculty of Pharmacy, the College of Science, the Museum of Arts and Sciences, and the administrative offices.

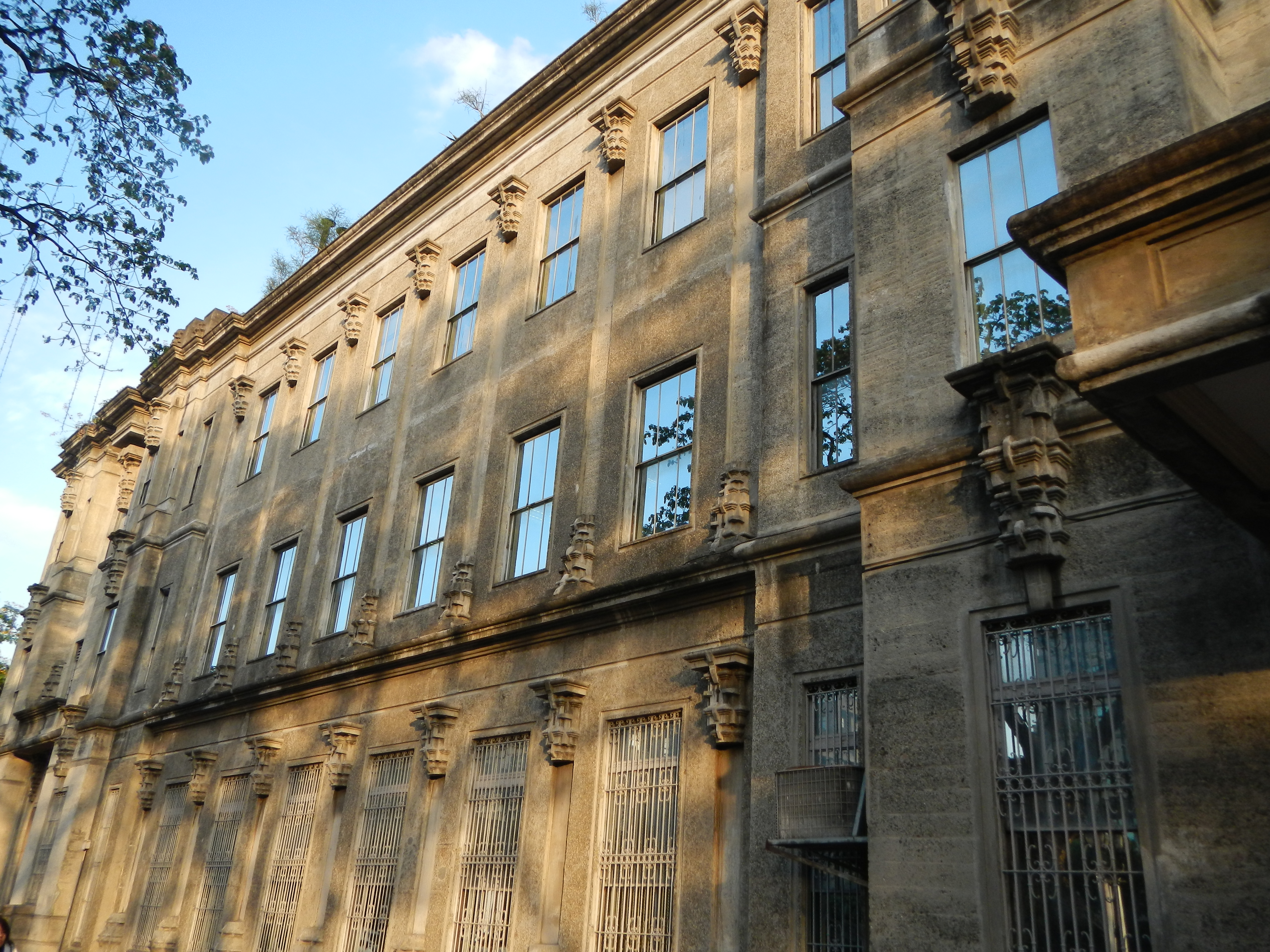
Several buildings adopted the unique capital of the Main Building.

The northeast quadrant of the campus includes the St. Raymund Penafort Building and the health and medical buildings. St. Raymund de Peñafort Building is built in International Style in 1955 and is home to the Faculty of Arts and Letters and the College of Commerce and Business Administration. Built in 1952, the Bauhaus-inspired San Martin de Porres Building houses the Faculty of Medicine and Surgery, the College of Nursing, and the College of Rehabilitation Sciences. The UST Hospital complex comprises the main St. Vincent Building, the Benavides Cancer Institute, the St. John Paul II Building, and the UST Hospital Clinical Division. The St. John Paul II Building was inaugurated in 2019 and serves as the extension of the UST Hospital.

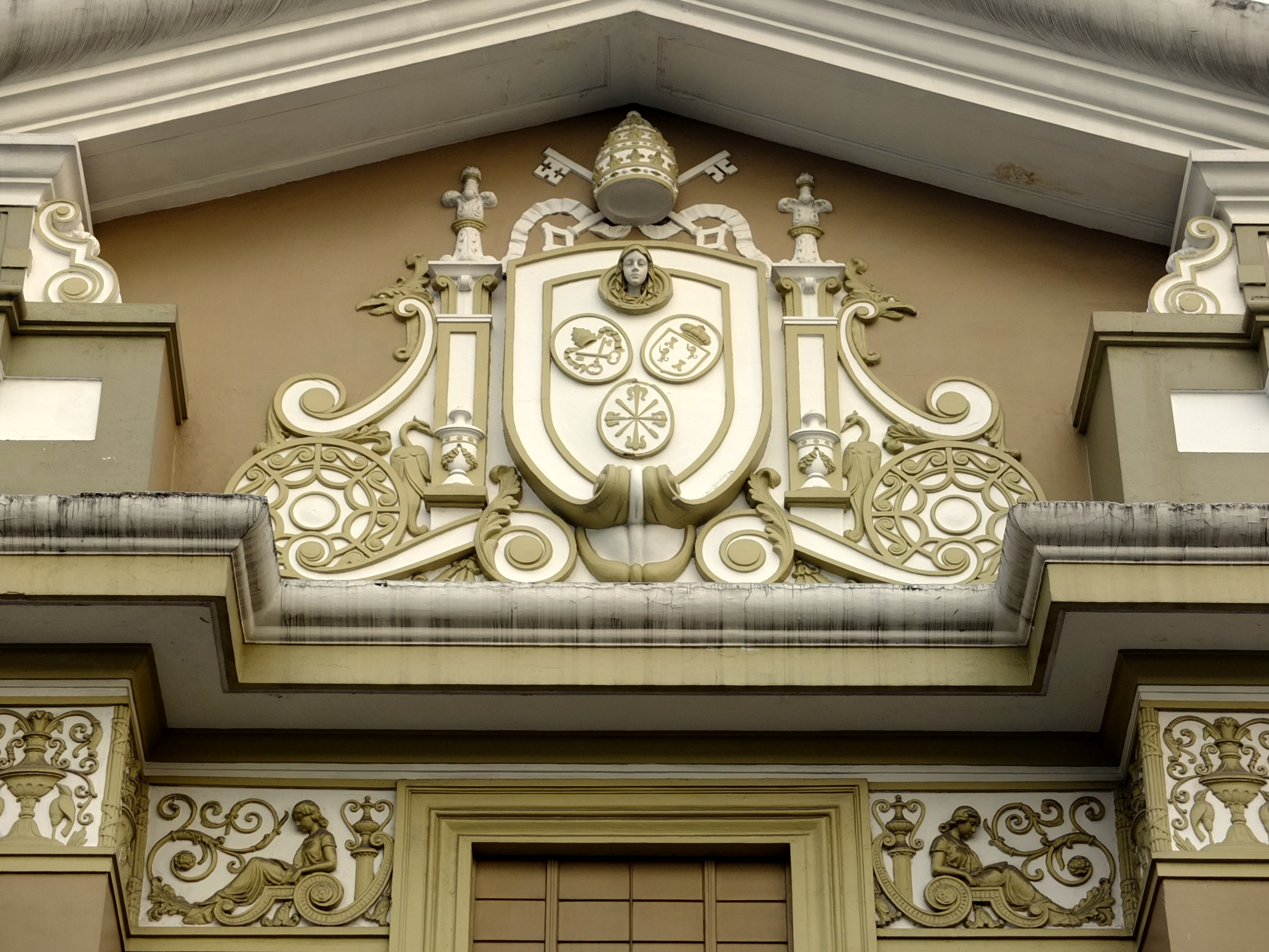
The pediment of the UST Hospital, which depicts the old university seal

The northwest quadrant comprises the Central Seminary, the Botanical Garden, the Benavides Building, the Central Laboratory Building, and the Thomas Aquinas Research Complex (TARC). The Central Seminary, built in 1933, is designed by Fernando Ocampo in Art Deco style. It also houses the Santísimo Rosario Parish and the Ecclesiastical Faculties. The Botanical Garden was established in 1932 and continues to serve students in the research of Philippine flora and medicinal plants. TARC is home to the Graduate School.

The southwest quadrant includes the Buenaventura Garcia Paredes, O.P. Building (BGPOP), the swimming pool, the UST Publishing House, the Beato Angelico Building, and the football field. BGPOP, also known as the Thomasian Alumni Center, sits on the site of the old UST Gymnasium. The Art Deco facade of the old gymnasium is preserved for its historical significance. The Beato Angelico Building occupies the site of the old UST Press, which was constructed in 1953. The College of Architecture and the College of Fine Arts and Design transferred from the Roque Ruano Building to the Beato Angelico Building in 2003.

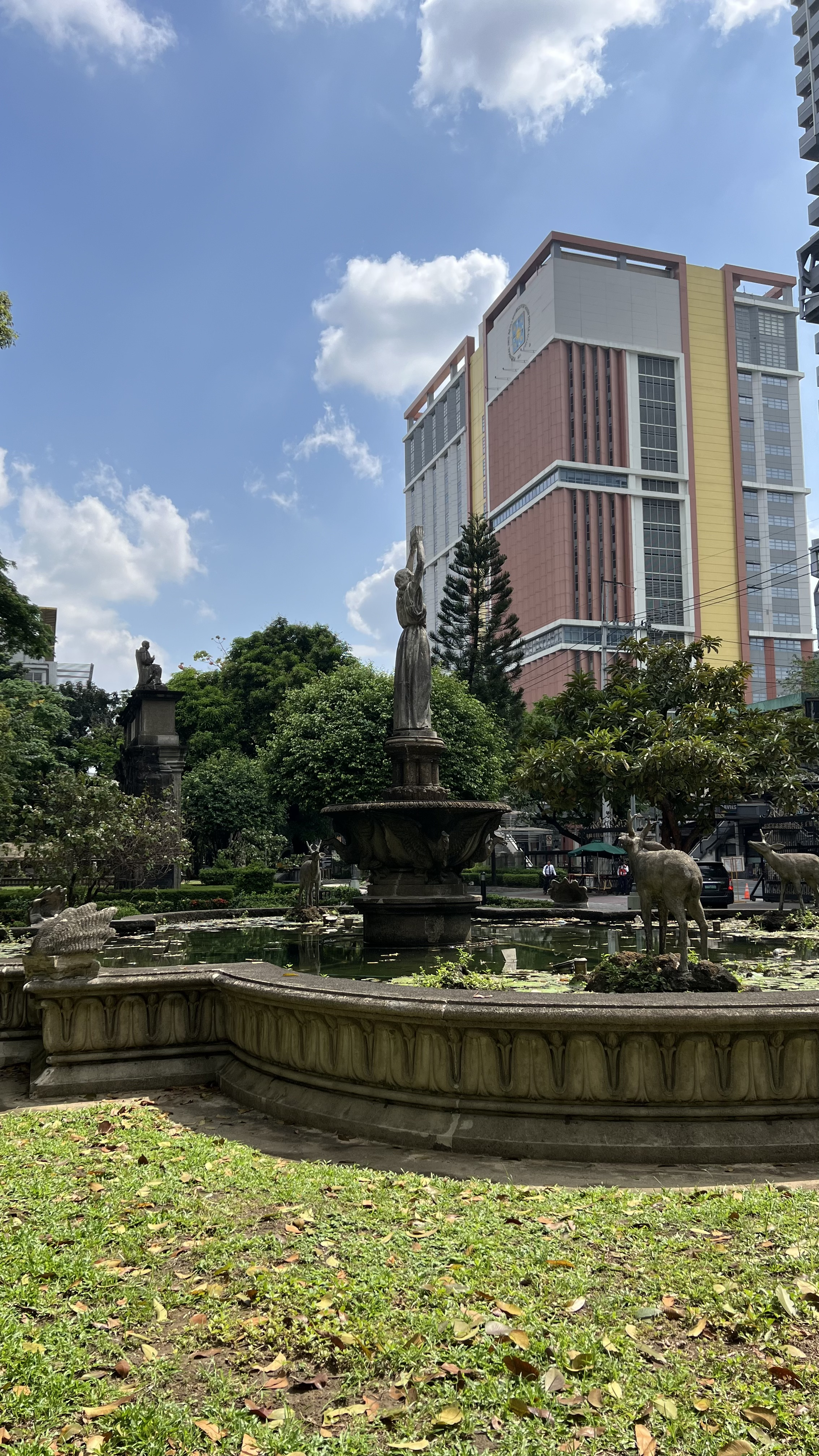
The Saint Pier Giorgio Frassati Building as seen from the Fountain of Knowledge at the Plaza Intramuros

The southeast quadrant comprises the Alfredo M. Velayo College of Accountancy and Multi-Deck Carpark Building, the Albertus Magnus Building, the Roque Ruaño Building, and the Quadricentennial Pavilion complex. The Albertus Magnus Building houses the College of Education and the Conservatory of Music. The Roque Ruaño Building, which houses the Faculty of Engineering, is built in 1952 and designed by Julio Victor Rocha. It initiated the application of the Niemeyer-inspired brise soleil in local buildings. The Quadricentennial Pavilion was the venue of the CNN Philippines vice-presidential debates in 2016, senatorial debates in 2019, and vice-presidential and presidential debates in 2022.

The Saint Pier Giorgio Frassati Building is located across the main campus and is connected by the UST Link Bridge. The Frassati Building houses the Senior High School, the College of Information and Computing Sciences, the DOST-TOMASInno Center, and several administrative offices. At its completion in 2019, it became the tallest educational building in the Philippines with 23 floors.

A stormwater drainage system that would help in mitigating UST's seasonal flood problem was completed in 2021. The underground system covers seven street zones that can hold 11.25 million liters of water.

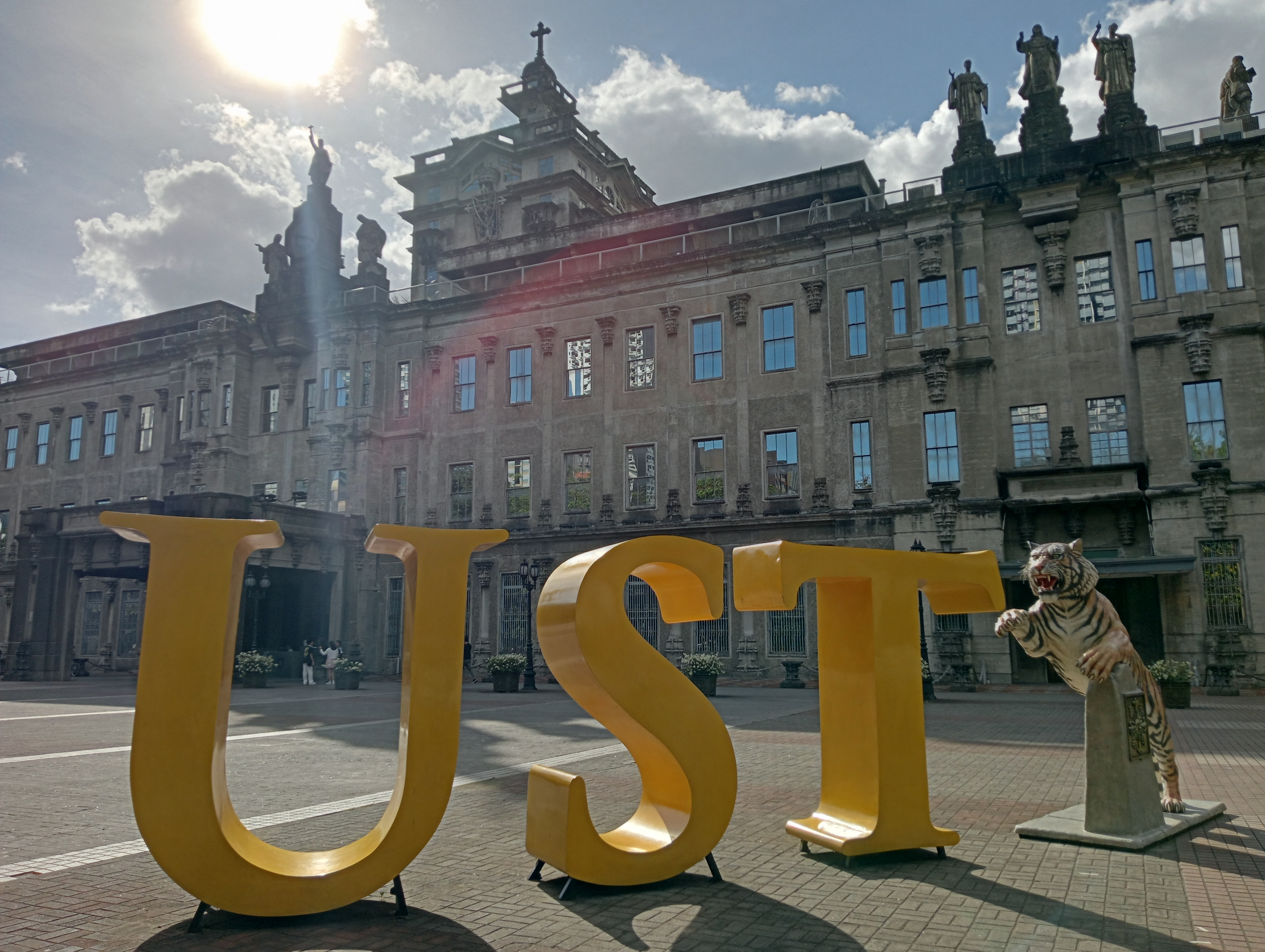
The new UST block letters and Bengal Tiger statue in 2024.

As part of the celebration of the 2022 Thomasian Welcome Walk, the new UST block letters and the Bengal Tiger statue were unveiled at the Plaza Mayor.

The campus was declared a National Historical Landmark by the National Historical Commission of the Philippines in 2011. Four of the university's structures were also declared National Cultural Treasures by the National Museum namely, the Arch of the Centuries, Main Building, the Central Seminary, and the university's open spaces.

=== Satellite campuses ===
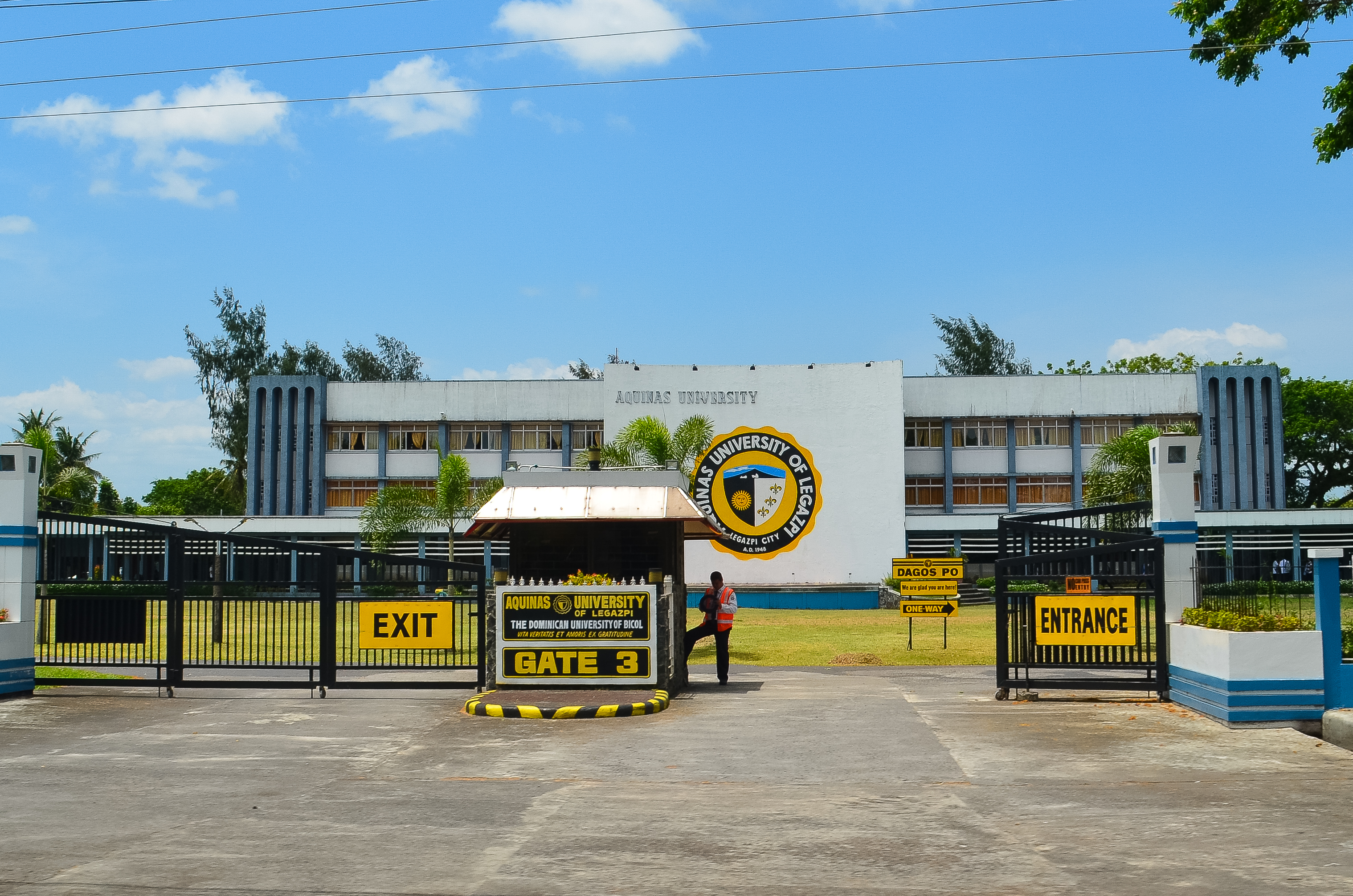
The University of Santo Tomas-Legazpi in Albay

The UST in Manila is the main campus of the University of Santo Tomas System, which comprises three other existing campuses and one upcoming UST campus in Santa Rosa, Laguna. UST Angelicum College in Quezon City and University of Santo Tomas–Legazpi in Legazpi, Albay integrated with the UST System in 2017.

UST Angelicum College is located in the Santo Domingo Church complex in Quezon City. It offers basic education programs, a home study program, and undergraduate programs. The campus was founded as the Angelicum School in 1972 by Rogelio Alarcon. The school changed its name to Angelicum College in 1996 after offering undergraduate courses in 1995. It offers programs in communication, entrepreneurship, human resource management, and information technology.

UST-Legazpi, formerly known as the Aquinas University of Legazpi, is located in Legazpi, Albay. It is the biggest catholic university in the Bicol Region, offering courses in the fields of law, medical, architecture, engineering, accountancy, teacher education, and arts and sciences. The university also has its own hospital.

UST General Santos is an 80-hectare (200-acre) campus in southern Philippines that is composed of 3 academic units in business and accountancy, engineering and technology, and health sciences. It is set to offer programs in agricultural and fishery research. The university acquired the land of the new campus in 1997, but the construction was stalled by land classification problems and local politics. In 2013, the local city council approved the rezoning of the university site to institutional from agricultural. The consultation and public hearing for the first phase of the establishment of the new campus was conducted in 2017. The construction broke ground on April 20, 2018, and was headed by then university rector Herminio Dagohoy. The campus opened on April 11, 2024.

UST Santa Rosa is a 40-hectare (99-acre) campus in Laguna that will offer undergraduate programs in science and engineering. The campus first broke ground on April 19, 2006, which was led by then university rector Tamerlane Lana and attended by tycoon Lucio Tan. The development of the campus was delayed for several years by changes in the administration, the Quadricentennial Celebration from 2009 to 2012, and prioritization of the construction projects in the main campus. On September 10, 2017, a second groundbreaking ceremony was held and led by then university rector Herminio Dagohoy. The construction of the first building in the campus, the UST–Dr. Tony Tan Caktiong Innovation Center, began in December 2020. The center is named after an alumnus and Jollibee Foods Corporation founder Tony Tan Caktiong, and it will be an annex of the Department of Science and Technology (DOST)-TOMASInno Center.

== Administration and organization ==
College	Year founded
Sacred Theology	1611
Philosophy	1611
Canon Law	1733
Civil Law	1734
Medicine & Surgery	1871
Pharmacy	1871
Arts & Letters	1896
Engineering	1907
Education	1926
Science	1926
Architecture	1930
Commerce & Business Administration	1934
Graduate School	1938
Music	1945
Nursing	1946
Rehabilitation Sciences	1974
Fine Arts & Design	2000
Physical Education & Athletics	2000
Accountancy	2005
Tourism & Hospitality Management	2009
Information & Computing Sciences	2014
Graduate School of Law	2017

UST operates under the Code of Canon Law of the Catholic Church, the apostolic constitution Ex corde Ecclesiae, the Catholic Bishops' Conference of the Philippines supplementary ordinances of the Ex corde Ecclesiae, and laws of the Philippine government.

The executive authorities of the university are the chancellor, the vice-chancellor, the rector, and the vice-rector. The ex-officio chancellor is the Master of the Order of Preachers. He appoints the rector of the university upon the approval of the Holy See. Currently, Filipino-Dominican priest Gerard Timoner III holds the position. The ex-officio vice-chancellor of the university is the Prior Provincial of the Dominican Province of the Philippines. The rector serves as the university's chief executive officer. He is assisted by a council of regents, an academic senate and an economic council. A dean heads an academic unit while being assisted by a faculty council and a regent, who is a member of the Order of Preachers.

UST Manila has 19 civil colleges, three ecclesiastical colleges, and three basic education schools. These are academic units that are organically interdependent with one another. A college may be referred to as a faculty, college, school, or institute, depending on when the academic unit was founded. The faculties, such as the Faculty of Civil Law, are formed during the Spanish colonial period, while colleges and schools, such as the College of Education and the Graduate School have been used since the American period. Institutes are adjuncts or naturally separate units of a specific faculty or college. Once an adjunct institute reaches a certain enrollment threshold, it becomes a separate college, independent of its faculty or parent college. The College of Information and Computing Sciences was founded as an institute when it separated from the Faculty of Engineering in 2014. It was elevated to the status of a college in 2021.

The UST Central Seminary and the UST Hospital have separate statutes but are still under the university. As a pontifical university, the Faculty of Sacred Theology, Faculty of Philosophy, and the Faculty of Canon Law or the UST Faculties of Ecclesiastical Studies are also governed by the apostolic constitution Veritatis gaudium that was issued by Pope Francis on December 8, 2017.

UST has three basic education schools, the Junior High School (JHS), the Senior High School (SHS) and the Education High School (EHS), which serves as a laboratory for the College of Education. In 2025, a senior high school program opened esclusively for EHS completers. The UST Elementary School used to offer primary education for children in the K-12 levels, but gradually stopped accepting applications starting from the K-level until the last batch of Grade 6 students graduated in 2011.

== Academic profile ==
Enrollment in UST (First term)
Academic year	Total enrollment
2018–2019	41,385
2019–2020	40,375
2022–2023	43,631
2023–2024	41,554
2024–2025	42,941
2025–2026	44,812
2026–2027	45,731

UST offers over 63 undergraduate programs in over 100 undergraduate specializations, three professional programs, over 50 master programs, and over 20 doctorate programs, enrolling 45,731 students in the first term of the academic year 2026–2027. The Faculty of Art and Letters received the most freshmen with 4,664 students and the Faculty of Engineering followed with 4,406. In 2026, there are at least 200 foreign students, majority are from Asian countries. The UST Hospital, which serves as the training hospital of the Faculty of Medicine and Surgery, offers 21 residency training programs. (Note: The list includes, Anesthesiology, Dermatology, Family and Community Medicine, Internal Medicine, Neurology and Psychiatry, Obstetrics-Gynecology, Ophthalmology, Otorhinolaryngology, Pediatrics, Pathology (Anatomic and Clinical), Radiology, Rehabilitation Medicine, Radiation Oncology, and Surgery (General, Neurosurgery, Orthopedics, Plastics, Thoracic and Cardiovascular, Urology). The UST hospital previously offered Nuclear Medicine.) The university produced 6,912 graduates in 2026.

=== Admissions ===
Applicants in USTET
Academic year	Applicants
2023–2024	42,993
2024–2025	50,067
2025–2026	46,700

The university administers the University of Santo Tomas Entrance Test (USTET) as one of the admission requirements for high school and college in UST Manila, college in UST General Santos, and senior high school in UST Angelicum College. The results are released on April 28, also the foundation day of the university. In 2020 and 2021, the USTET was replaced by the UST Admission Rating (USTAR) because of the COVID-19 situation in the country. The USTAR was a composite score that evaluated parameters obtained primarily from the academic records of the applicant. In 2020, the university received 48,411 applications for the USTAR, admitting 7,772 college freshmen for the school year 2021–2022. The Faculty of Engineering had the most freshmen for three consecutive years, with 1,071 students. The USTET resumed in 2022 for the 2023–2024 school year.

The USTET is also conducted in 35 provincial testing centers and 8 international testing sites, namely Hong Kong, Doha, Dubai, Manama, Muscat, Al-Khobar, Jeddah, and Riyadh.

The Faculty of Medicine and Surgery separately conducts a psychological examination for the first-year Doctor of Medicine program as part of the admission process. However, the scholastic standing and NMAT score are given the biggest weight in accepting applicants. Applicants must have a GWA score of at least 2.00/B+/86% and an NMAT score of at least 85th percentile. About 480 candidates are accepted out of 1,700 to 1,900 applicants annually. No entrance examination was held in 2021. For the B.S. in Basic Human Studies (LEAPMed) program, the faculty shortlists the top 200 USTET college applicants using the UST Predictive Scoring. It comprises the USTET score or USTAR rating, the LEAPMed examination score, and the IQ score. After an interview and a psychological examination, only the top 90 applicants are accepted.

The Faculty of Civil Law also conducts a separate entrance examination for the degree of Juris Doctor.

=== Faculty and curriculum ===
In 2019, UST had 2,164 teaching faculty members, the most among private institutions and second in the country. The faculty comprised 1,160 master's degree holders (largest among private institutions) and 333 doctoral degree holders.

The academic year is divided into two terms. The academic performance is graded through the use of the 5-point numerical grading system: 1.00 as excellent, 3.00 as passed, and 5.00 as failed. All bachelor's degrees in the university include theology courses in their curricula.

In response to the COVID-19 pandemic, classes at the university were delivered through the "enhanced virtual mode" for school years 2020–2021 and 2021–2022.

The Doctor of Medicine (M.D.) program offered by the Faculty of Medicine and Surgery is a four-year post-graduate degree that consists of three years of academic instruction in the medical school and one year of clinical clerkship in the UST Hospital. The faculty implements a blended integrated approach, adopting problem-based learning (PBL) as a teaching model in appropriate teaching-learning scenarios, and recently, outcome-based education (OBE), a curriculum that emphasizes the achievement of expected learning outcomes.

The Faculty of Civil Law offers a four-year course, which leads to Juris Doctor (J.D.) degree. The curriculum mirrors the current model curriculum of the Legal Education Board. Master of Laws (LL.M.) and Doctor of Civil Law (D.C.L.) are offered at the Graduate School of Law.

In 2002, the university embarked on e-learning by offering web-enhanced courses through Blackboard called e-LEAP (e-Learning Access Program). In 2023, the UST System shifted to Canvas as its learning management system.

=== Research ===
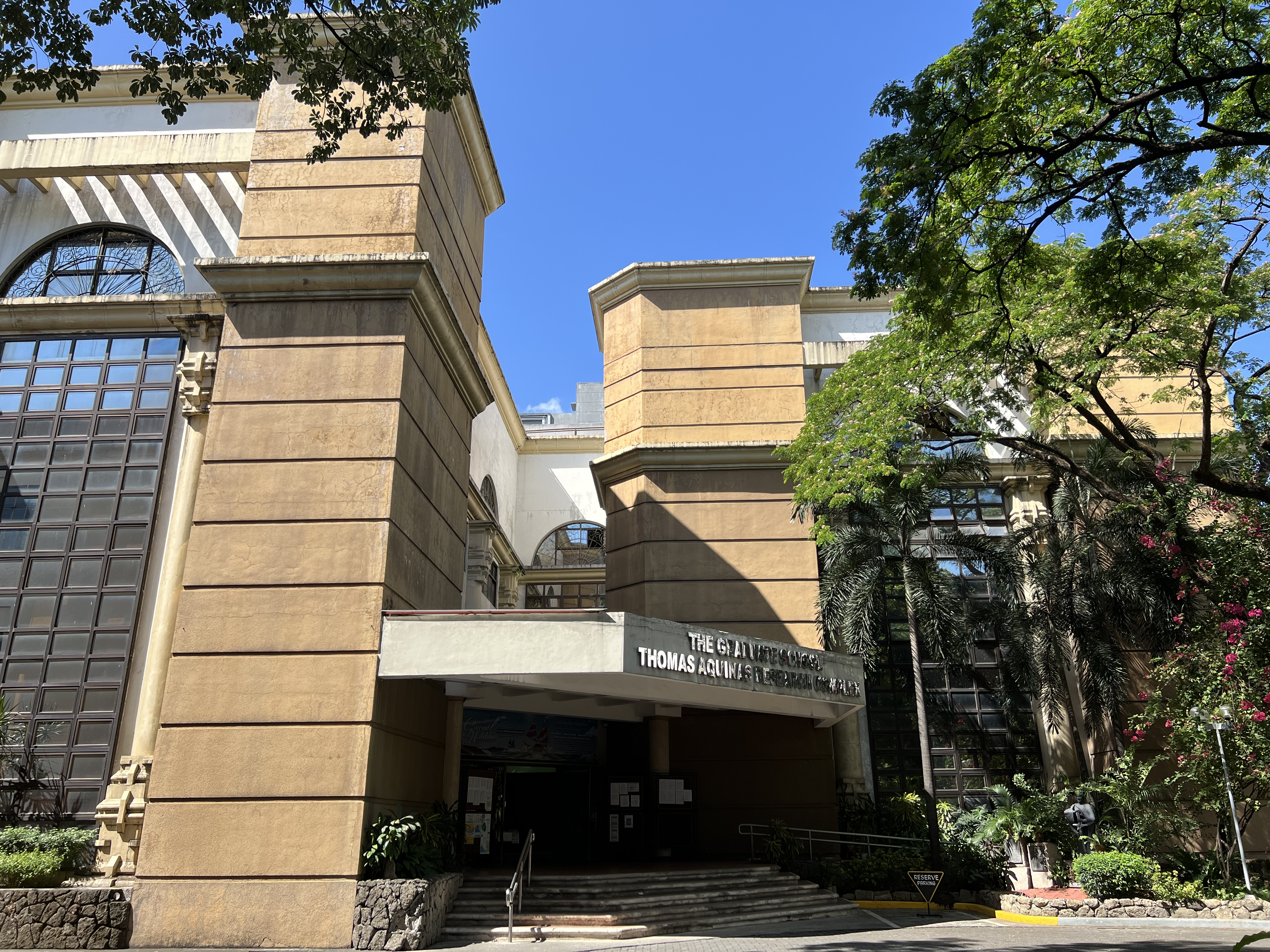
The Thomas Aquinas Research Complex

UST is one of five Philippine universities recognized as a first-tier comprehensive higher education institution by the Second Congressional Commission on Education (EDCOM II) in 2024. It is a member of the Philippine Higher Education Research Network (PHERNET) and Higher Education Regional Research Centers (HERRC). The university spent ₱91 million and ₱116 million in research in 2017 and 2018 respectively.

The university has several research centers, namely the Research Center for Natural and Applied Sciences (RCNAS), Research Center for Culture, Arts, and the Humanities (RCCAH), Research Center for Social Sciences and Education (RCSSEd), Research Center for Health Sciences (RCHS), Center for Religious Studies and Ethics (CTRSE), Center for Health Research and Movement Science (CHRMS), Center for Conservation of Cultural Property and Environment in the Tropics (CCCPET), and the Center for Creative Writing and Literary Studies (CCWLS). In 2026, the Research Center for Engineering and Technological Sciences (RCETS) was established. The main venue for research in Manila campus is the Thomas Aquinas Research Complex.

UST has recently discovered several plant species, namely Vanda ustii, Hedyotis papafranciscoi, Mycetia dagohoyana, Pyrostria arayatensis, and Freycinetia nonatoi. The university established the UST Herbarium in the 1870s, to fulfill a requirement of the Spanish government and enable UST to offer science degrees. The Herbarium holds more than 11,000 identified plant specimens. It is also involved in plant curation, storage, and identification through DNA barcoding that aides in taxonomy and conservation.

The UST Zooplankton Ecology, Systematics, and Limnology Laboratory is home to the first and only organized assemblage of zooplankton samples and specimens (UST Zooplankton Reference Collection) collected within the Philippines. As of 2019, the UST Collection of Microbial Strains, holds 224 collections of indigenous, clinical, and biotechnological microbial strains. The institute is a member of ASEAN Network on Microbial Utilization (AnMicro), World Federation for Culture Collections and the Asian Consortium for the Conservation and Sustainable Use of Microbial Resources.

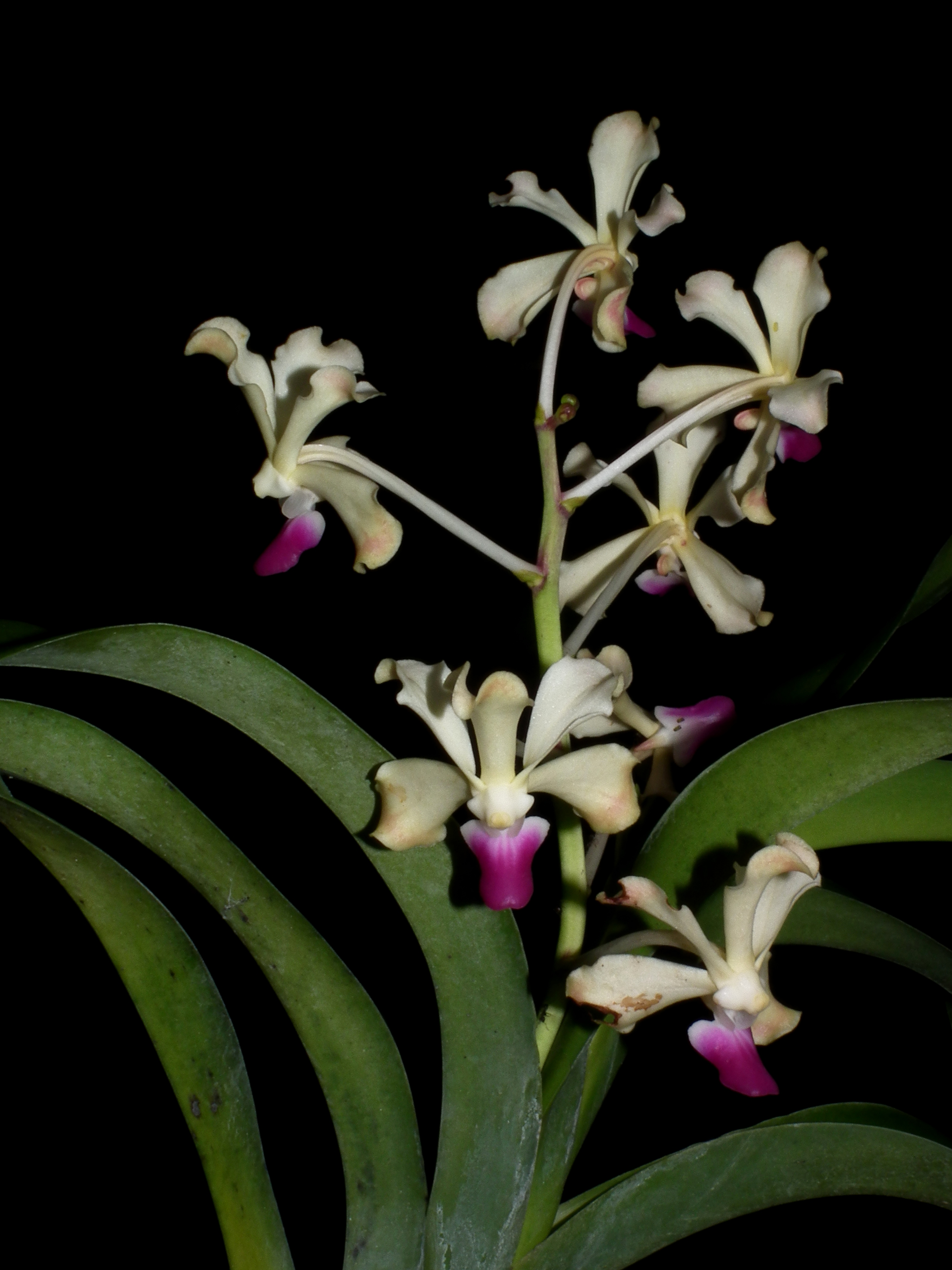
Vanda ustii, an orchid species, is named after the university.

UST Eco Tigers I, a team composed of mechanical and electrical engineering students and faculty members from the Faculty of Engineering, ranked first in the prototype diesel category of the Shell Eco-Marathon Asia (SEMA) 2019 held in May 2019 in Selangor, Malaysia. The team also ranked 8th in Asia from 26 participating teams under the prototype category with energy source internal combustion engine (ICE).

UST, primarily through the College of Science, is setting up a research and training facility building for the UST Laboratories for Vaccine Science, Molecular Biology, and Biotechnology, or the UST VaxLab. The center has been developing inexpensive oral yeast vaccines against COVID-19 and African Swine Fever (ASF) since 2021.

The university and the Philippine Department of Science and Technology (DOST) launched the DOST–TOMASInno Center, a technology business incubator (TBI), in 2019. The center was made possible through a research grant from the DOST.

The Center for Conservation of Cultural Property and Environment in the Tropics (CCCPET) provides research, training, and cultural mapping of various national cultural heritages. It assisted in the development of San Pablo City Heritage District conservation guidelines, the rehabilitation of Immaculate Conception Parish Church in Guiuan, Eastern Samar, and churches in Bohol and Leyte, the cultural mapping of cities and municipalities in Baguio, Pampanga, Iloilo City, Samar, and Leyte. The center was a recipient of US Embassy grants for the capacity building of cultural heritage workers in 2017 to 2019.

Several publications made by the university include Acta Manilana, the Antoninus Journal, The Asian Journal of English Language Studies, Boletin Ecclesiastico, Journal of Medicine, Tomas, UST Law Review, Philippine Journal of Allied Health Sciences, and Unitas. Established in 1922, Unitas is the oldest extant university-based academic journal in the country. Acta Manilana, founded in 1965, is a multidisciplinary journal that features research papers from the Research Center for the Natural and Applied Sciences. The university journals have been available on a web portal since 2018.

UST is sixth in the country in the 2026 Alper-Doger Scientific Index, an institutional ranking system based on the performance and productivity of affiliated scientists. Four hundred fifty-five Thomasian scientists placed in the ranking system.

=== Sustainability ===
The university consistently ranked in the Times Higher Education's Impact Rankings which delivered the 17-part United Nations' Sustainable Development Goals (SDGs). UST ranked first among Philippine universities in 2020 and third in 2026. The university place fourth in the country with a ranking of 834 worldwide in Quacquarelli Symonds (QS) World University Sustainability Rankings. UST's engagement to help local communities predated the UN SDGs.

The UST Simbahayan Community Development Office, established in 2010 as the centerpiece project of the quadricentennial celebration, leads programs and projects in community development, research, and instruction, that involves students, alumni, staff, and national partner communities in becoming agents of social transformation. The term Simbahayan is a combination of the words simbahan, bayan, and tahanan, which means church, nation, and home respectively. In 2018, UST partnered with a Lumad school to provide accessible education for indigenous people of Mindanao.

In 2021, the Center for Advanced Materials for Clean Energy Technologies based on Indigenous Materials (CAMCET) was established under the partnership of the UST Research Center for Natural and Applied Sciences, Mapua University, Adamson University, and the Department of Science and Technology. The center will research the use of indigenous materials for fuel cell and energy storage applications.

In 2023, the university entered a six-year cooperation agreement with the government's Climate Change Commission. The linkage will involve joint research and policy development initiatives, academic lectures, seminars, training workshops, and short courses for climate innovation, sustainability, and possibly, cultural heritage preservation.

UST's Energy Management System (EnMS) include the Go! Renewable Time or GRT-76 project. It refers to the solar power harvest from 7:00 to 18:00. As of 2024, solar panel installation has begun on top of the Albertus Magnus Building.

=== Libraries and archives ===
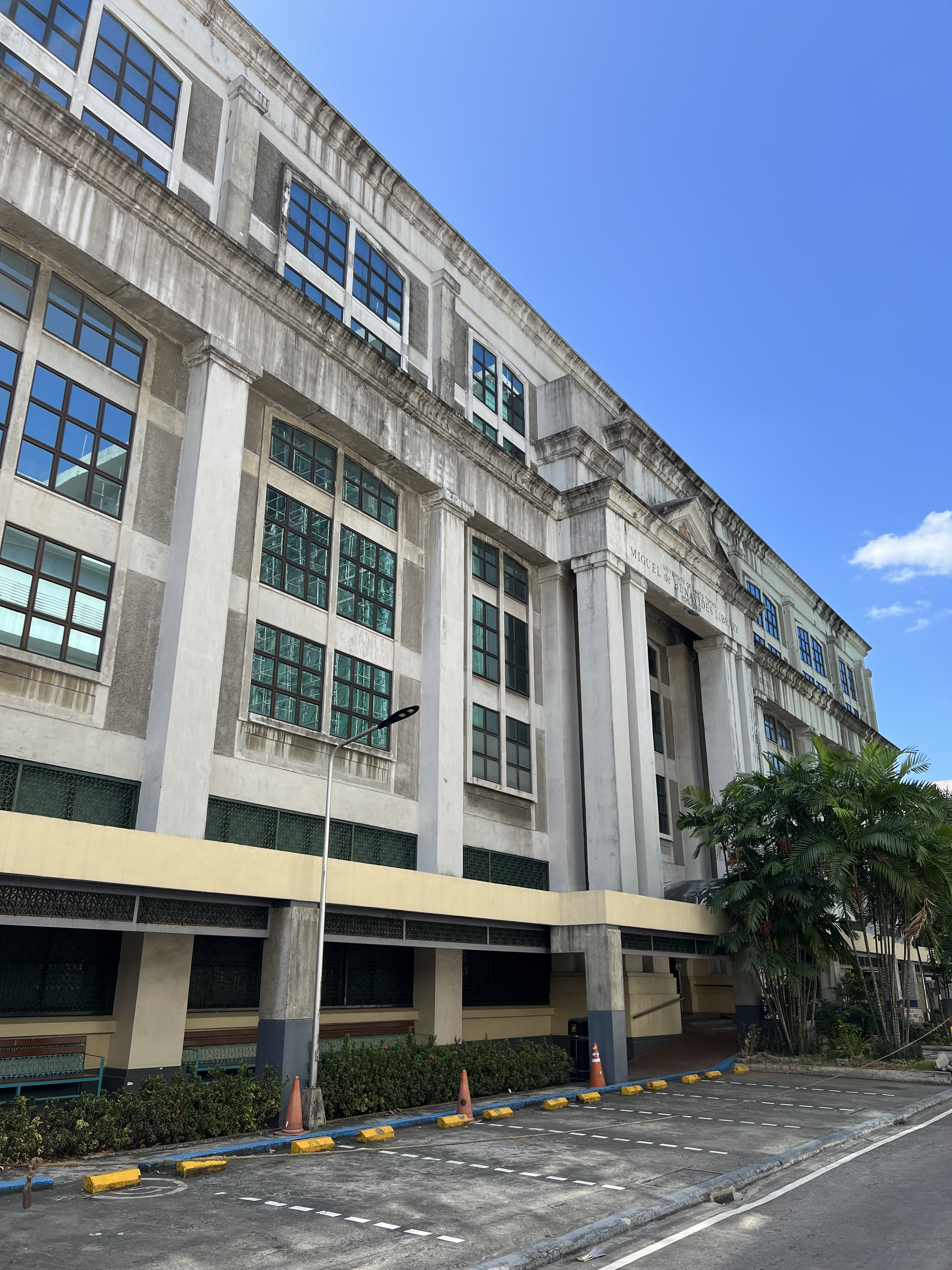
The Miguel de Benavides Library

As of 2017–2018, the Miguel de Benavides Library holds over 360,000 books and logged 10,948,882 accesses to electronic resources remotely. In 2018–2019, it received over 1,100,000 visitors. The main library is located in a six-story building along Alberto Drive. It has sixteen sections and seven branch libraries, namely the Architecture Commons, Ecclesiastical, Health Sciences, Education High School, Junior High School, Senior High School, and the BiblioTechAI. BiblioTechAI is the satellite library for the College of Information and Computing Sciences in the Saint Pier Giorgio Frassati, O.P. Building.

As of 2017, the Health Sciences Library had 20,904 titles and 25,311 volumes. It was assessed to have sound and good-quality collections based on Doody's Core Titles (DCT) among five select medical libraries in the Philippines.

The collections of the Antonio Vivencio del Rosario UST Heritage Library include 30,000 volumes published between 1492 and 1900. Among the collections are La Guerra Judaica (1492) by Josephus Flavius, De revolutionibus orbium coelestium (First edition, 1543) of Nicolaus Copernicus, and the first book ever written and published in the Philippines, Doctrina Christiana (1593).

In partnership with the Union Bank of the Philippines, the library launched the Lumina Pandit (spreading the light) rare books exhibit in 2011. The partnership included a three-phase program: the conservation, digitization, and publication of the university's archives and historical collections. In 2015, Unionbank gave another ₱30 million to fund the digitization of historical collections from 1492 to 1900 as part of the Lumina Pandit II. In 2017, the conservation efforts continued with Semper Lumina (always the light). The project launched a 6-volume catalogue of rare books and periodicals and the UST Digital Library. As of the launching, 1.5 million pages have been scanned by the library for restoration and online publication, including the first-edition of José Rizal's Noli Me Tángere.

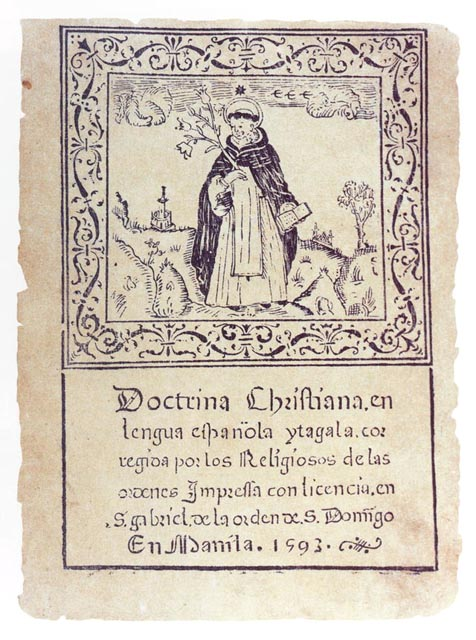
The Doctrina Christiana, the first book printed in the Philippines

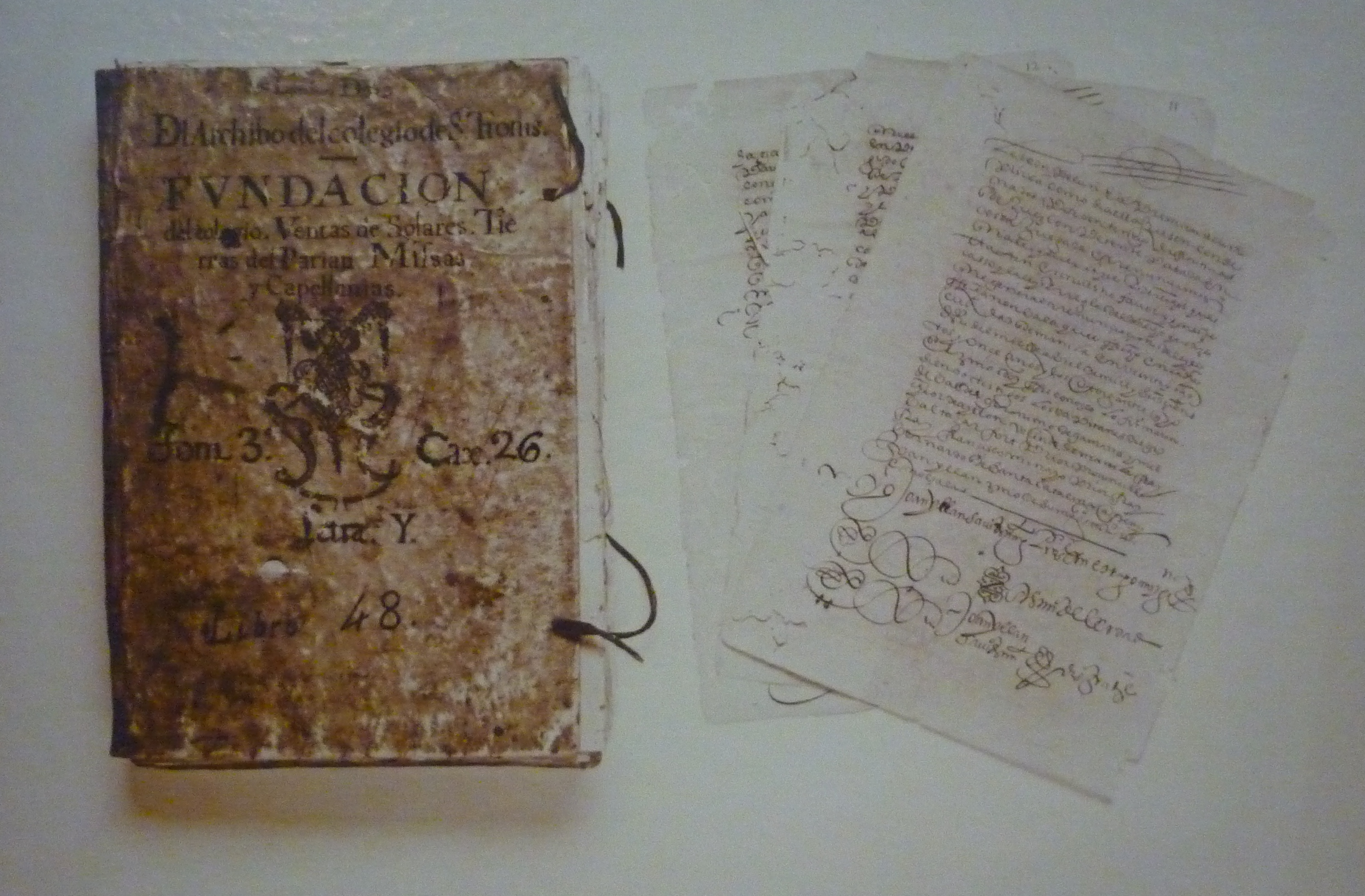
The Escritura de la Fundación del Colegio de Santo Tomás (Foundation Act) of 1611, stored in the UST Archives

The university received the annual prize in the category of education and science in Casa Asia Awards 2021 in Spain. The library was also recognized for its efforts in preserving its heritage and digitizing its collections.

The Archivo de la Universidad de Santo Tomas (AUST) houses old books, various incunabula, papal bulls, university records, and original documents relevant to the university foundation. AUST holds the biggest collection of extant ancient baybayin scripts in the world. Two 17th-century deeds of sale documents in baybayin, the oldest of their kind, were declared National Cultural Treasures by the National Archives of the Philippines in 2014.

The scholastic records of José Rizal in Ateneo Municipal de Manila and UST are also preserved in the archives. The early Spanish-Hokkien manuscripts, such as Dictionario Hispanico Sinicum (1626–1642) and Vocabulario de la Lengua Chiõ Chiu (1620) (A Lexicon of the Chiangchiu-descended dialect of Hokkien in Early Spanish Manila), early 17th century Spanish-Chinese dictionaries and vocabularies were discovered by Spanish and Taiwanese scholars in the archives in 2017. The Dictionario Hispanico Sinicum (1626–1642) is considered to be the world's oldest extant and largest Spanish-Chinese dictionary.

=== Museums and collections ===
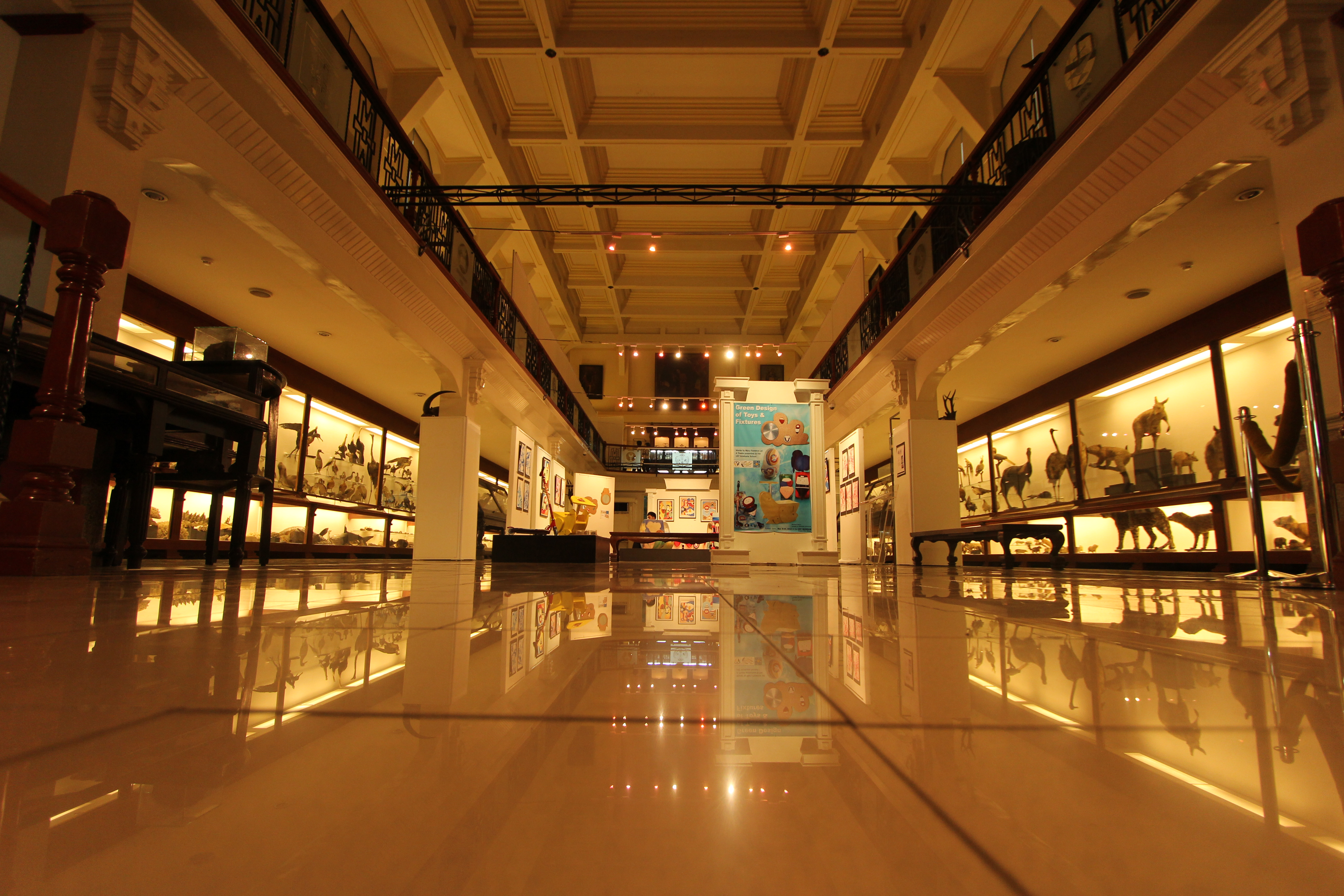
The UST Museum of Arts and Sciences is located in the old paraninfo of the UST Main Building.

The UST Museum of Arts and Sciences, founded in 1871 as the Gabinete de Fisica (Cabinet of Physics), is the oldest museum in the Philippines. It houses the oldest zoological collection in the country, with over 100,000 specimens collected and curated in the 19th century by Dominican priest and professor Castro de Elera. De Elera also published Catalogo Sistematico de toda La Fauna de Filipinas (Catalog of Philippine Fauna) in 1895. It was the first systematic work in zoology in the country. The museum also holds 4,899 species and subspecies of Philippine mollusks, the most among all mollusk museums in the world. Part of the museum collection includes artifacts of Philippine ethnology, coins, medals, and memorabilias. Two of the five chairs used by the popes who visited the university are on permanent display.

The UST Hall of Visual Arts features restored paintings from various foreign and local artists, as well as works from several national artists. The collection includes a portrait of José Rizal by Victorio Edades, El Studio Natural of Félix Resurrección Hidalgo, and four masterpieces of Fernando Amorsolo. The museum's restoration project was funded by grants from the early editions of the UST Christmas Concert Gala.

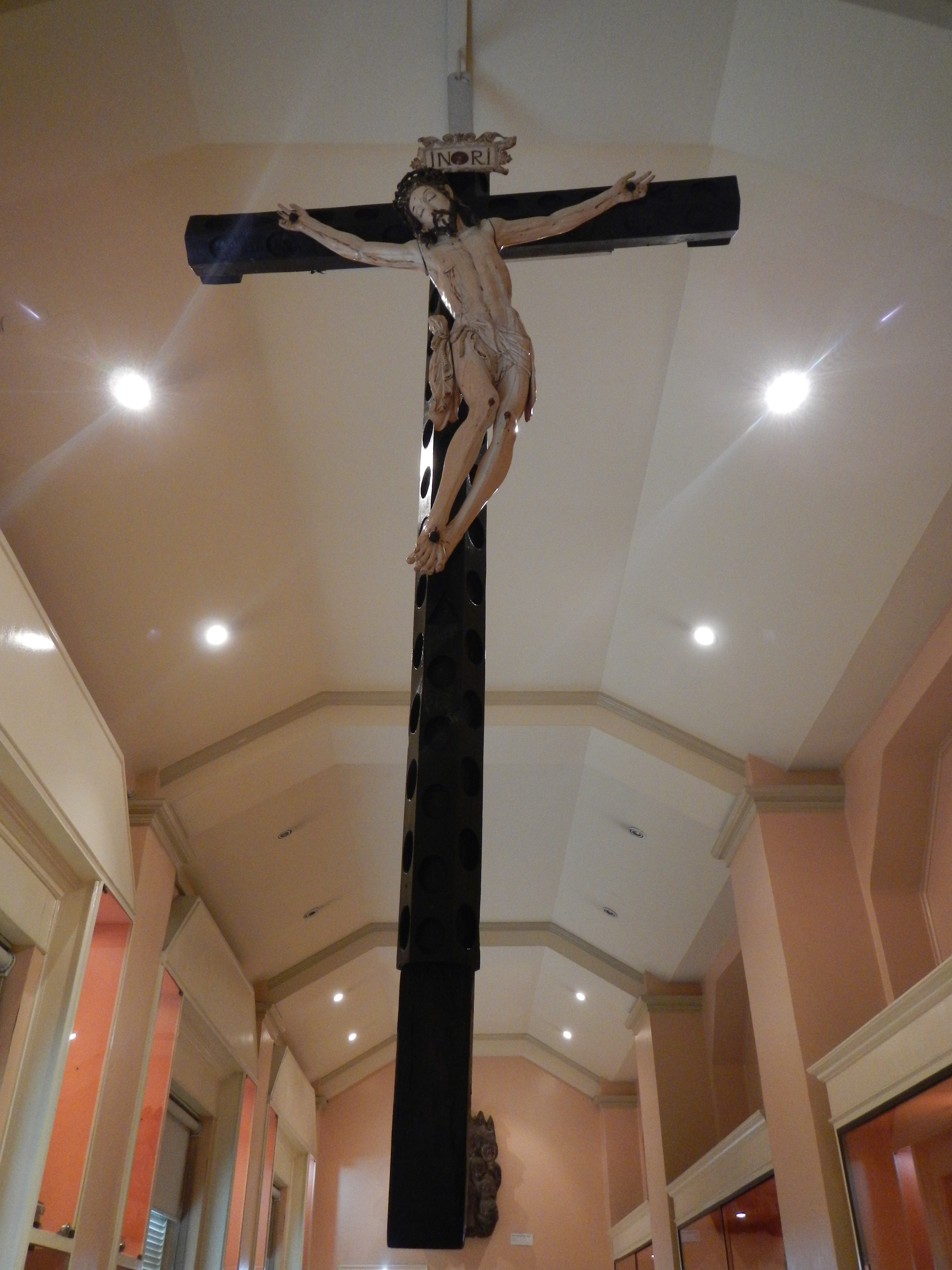
The largest ivory crucifix ever made in the Philippines

The Hall of Philippine Religious Images houses images collected from the various provinces of the country. Part of its collection includes the largest ivory crucifix ever made in the Philippines, which was controversially featured in the October 2012 issue of National Geographic.

Other museums include the UST Medicine Museum, Dr. Julieta Hayag-Manchanda UST Anatomy Gallery, and UST Beato Angelico Art Gallery. The Anatomy Gallery serves as a showcase of all the teaching materials in anatomy. It features thick glass containers that hold dissected specimens for gross anatomy, neuroanatomy, and embryology.

=== Publishing ===
The UST Publishing House (USTPH) was established in 1996 when the Santo Tomas University Press (STUP) and the UST Printing Office merged. The STUP was founded as La Imprenta de los Dominicanos de Manila in 1593 by the Dominican priest Francisco de San Jose. It is one of the oldest continuing presses in the world today, only next to Cambridge University Press in the United Kingdom.

The publishing house maintains a bookstore which is located on the ground floor of the UST Main Building. Regular publications include The Academia, the international bulletin of university, and The Varsitarian, the student newspaper.

=== Recognition and accreditation ===
Centers of Development
- Civil Engineering
- Communication
- Computer Science
- Electrical Engineering
- Electronics Engineering
- Industrial Engineering
- Information Systems
- Information Technology
- Journalism
- Library and Information Science
- Literature
- Mechanical Engineering
- Physical Therapy
Centers of Excellence
- Biology
- Chemical Engineering
- Chemistry
- Hotel and Restaurant Management
- Medical Technology
- Medicine
- Music
- Nursing
- Pharmacy
- Philosophy
- Psychology
- Teacher Education
- Tourism / Travel Management

UST is classified as an autonomous higher education institution by the Commission on Higher Education (CHED). The autonomous status is the highest grant given by CHED, which allows universities to implement programs with less government regulation. UST became autonomous in 2002. In 2016, UST was one of only three private universities granted five-year autonomous status.

Twenty-six programs in the university are declared as Centers of Excellence (COE) and Centers of Development (COD) by CHED, the most of any private educational institution and second in the country. COE status is granted to 13 programs, and COD status is also given to 13. UST is one of the only three Philippine universities recognized as a Center of Excellence in the Doctor of Medicine program. The architecture program was one of the only two architecture programs in the country recognized as Center of Excellence.

UST has been cited by the Philippine Association of Colleges and Universities Commission on Accreditation (PACUCOA) as the university with the highest number of accredited programs in the country since 2011. As of July 2024, PACUCOA has accredited 59 programs of the university. UST also has the most Level IV accredited programs, with 27.

UST became an associate member of the ASEAN University Network-Quality Assurance (AUN-QA) group in 2016. In 2020, it was the first associate member to receive an institutional certification. AUN-QA also certified 30 programs from the university.

All six engineering programs of the university, namely civil, chemical, electric, electronics, industrial, and mechanical, were accredited by the Engineering Accreditation Commission of the Accreditation Board for Engineering and Technology (ABET) in 2020 and 2026.

=== Rankings ===
University rankings
- University of Santo Tomas

Global – Overall
- QS World: 951–1000 (2027)
- THE World: 1,601–1,800 (2027)

Regional – Overall
- QS Asia: 202 (2027)
- THE Asia: 601+ (2026)

National – Overall
- QS National: 4 (2026)

UST is the first Philippine university to be awarded by the QS World University Rankings (QS) with four QS stars and five QS stars as an institution in 2015 and 2021 respectively. The university achieved five stars for teaching, employability, internationalization, and facilities while scoring four stars for academic development. QS also gave a five-star rating to the Doctor of Medicine program.UST was ranked 251–300 in the QS Graduate Employability Rankings 2023.

In the THE World University Rankings by Subject 2026, UST ranked 501-600 in education studies, 601-800 in medical and health, 801-1000 in life sciences category and 1001+ in social sciences. In the QS World Subject Rankings 2026, medicine ranked 701-850.

In 2026, the Commission on Higher Education recognized UST as the leading Philippine institution in world rankings by obtaining the most placements in CHED-accredited international ranking bodies, which include QS, THE, and the World University Rankings for Innovation (WURI).

The UST Graduate School has seven programs included in the Eduniversal 2026 Business Schools Ranking. The master programs recognized are communication, economics, human resource management, industrial and operations management, public administration, MBA, and MBA major in entrepreneurship. The UST Graduate School is ranked as a good business school.

=== International linkages ===
UST has partnerships and linkages with 171 foreign academic institutions in 32 countries. A dual-degree program in Ph.D. Built Environment/Architecture is offered in collaboration with the University of Reading. The university also offers a ladderised program in Master in Public Health (International) in partnership with the University of Leeds. The partnership between the university and the Duke University allows nursing students of both universities to attend global health courses and participate in clinical immersions. Select students from the Manila and General Santos campuses can participate in the International Internship Program at the Mahidol University in Thailand.

== Student life ==
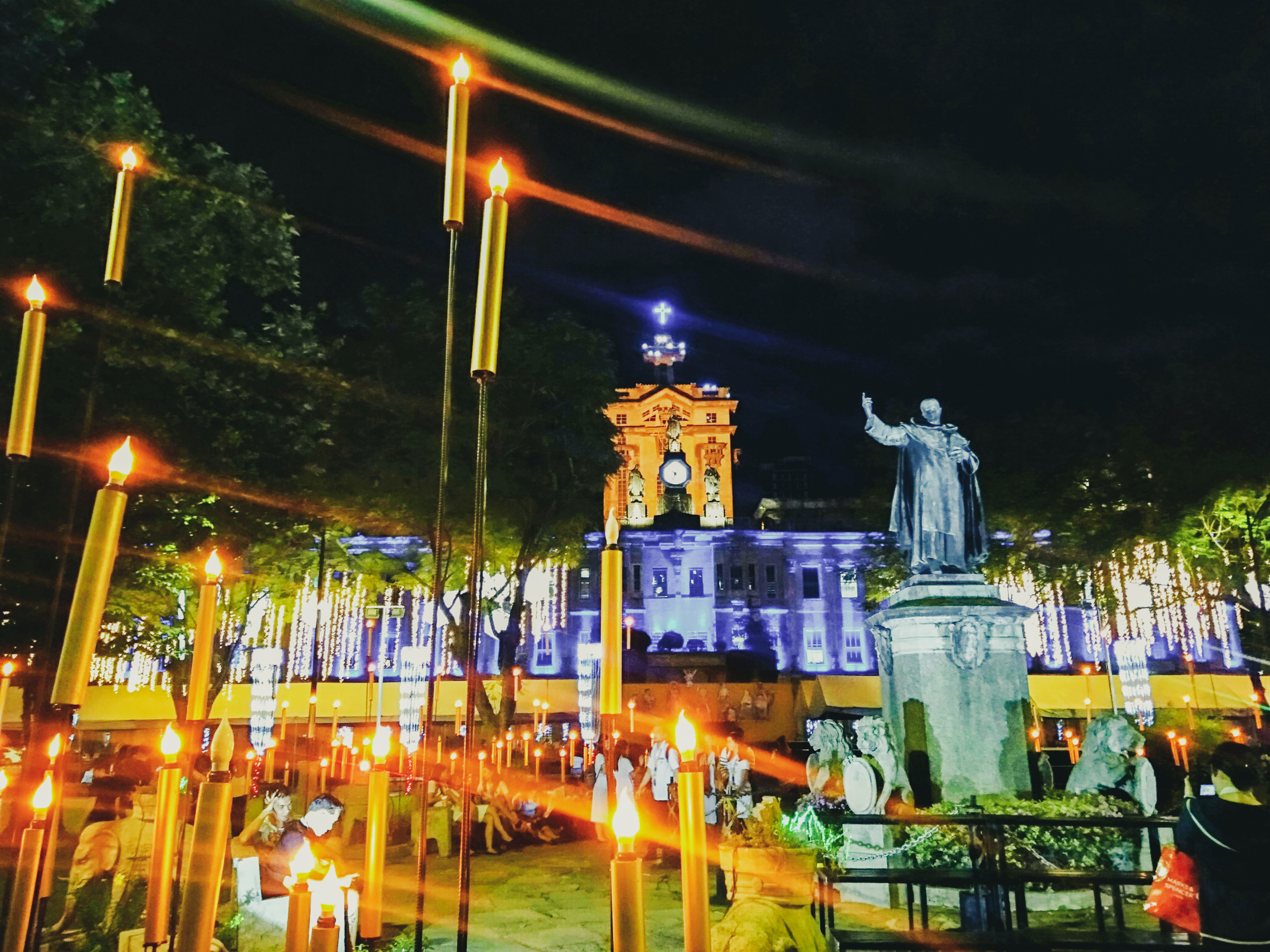
The UST Main Building and Benavides Monument during the Harry Potter-themed 2019 Christmas season

The university marks events with a variety of ceremonies largely influenced by the Hispano-Filipino Dominican Catholic culture and Philippine culture. This includes the Misa de Apertura and Discurso de Apertura, the Mass and lecture opening the academic year. As one of the oldest traditions in the university, the Discurso began in 1866. The Thomasian Welcome Walk where freshmen pass under the Arch of the Centuries at the start of their education at the university. Part of the welcome events are the in-person orientation called Roarientation for higher education freshmen and Alab (flame) for basic education freshmen. The UST Paskuhan, a series of monthlong campus events, celebrate the significance and value of Christmas. It features reenactments of the Christmas story, a campus-wide banquet, live concerts, and light and pyrotechnic displays.

Just before the solemn investiture ceremonies or graduation, the academic year ends with the campus-wide Baccalaureate Mass, the Ceremony of the Light, and send-off rites that are often held at the grandstand. At the end of the Ceremony of the Light, graduating students turn around to face the cross on top of the UST Main Building to sing the UST Hymn. This gesture of turning around is carried on by students and alumni who watch the UAAP games in other venues. Instead of facing the competing team during the singing of the school hymn, Thomasians in the audience turn around to face the university flag that is waved by the UST Yellow Jackets pep squad at the bleachers. The main event of the closing ceremonies is the graduating students' recessional parade through the Arch of the Centuries, which signifies the culmination of their Thomasian life.

As is customary in many Catholic institutions, activities and traffic within the campus stop at 12:00 and 18:00 PST (GMT+8) for the Angelus and at 15:00 PST for the 3 o'clock Prayer to the Divine Mercy daily.

The tiger statue in Plaza Mayor, which was installed in 2022, gained media attention when it transformed into a wishing well as students filled its open mouth with coins. The statue was barricaded the following day.

A sports competition among the university colleges is the annual Thomasian Goodwill Games, which was inaugurated in the school year 2002–2003. Sporting events include basketball, volleyball, and football.

=== Student organizations ===
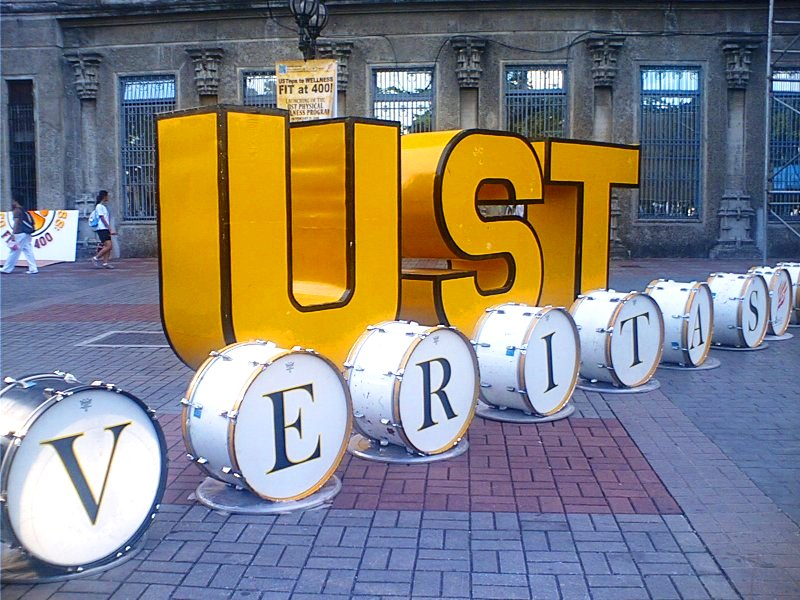
The bass drums of the UST Yellow Jackets pep squad showing veritas, the university's motto

The university hosts hundreds of student organizations which include a wide range of disciplines: religious, cultural, performing, media, socio-civic, and student service. The Central Student Council is the highest governing student body of the university. The Student Organizations Coordinating Council (SOCC) is the central body of all recognized organizations of the university.

The UST Singers is a mixed choral ensemble that has won Choir of the World twice and Choir of the World Champion of Champions in the Llangollen International Musical Eisteddfod. Founded in 1927, the UST Symphony Orchestra is composed of faculty and students that performs regularly as a resident company at the Cultural Center of the Philippines. The UST Salinggawi Dance Troupe, both the cheer and the dance subteams, have won local and international competitions.

=== Literature and media ===
May 1, 2024 edition of The Varsitarian.

The Varsitarian is the student publication of the university. Established in January 1928 by students from the UST Literary Club led by Jose Villa Panganiban, it is the oldest Catholic newspaper in the Philippines. It is published fortnightly. The lampoon issue is called The Vuisitarian, a portmanteau of buwisit, a Tagalog expression used for unlucky events, and Varsitarian. The publication hosts the annual Inkblots, a national campus journalism fellowship that gathers student journalists, journalism and communication enthusiasts, and media professionals.The UST Center for Creative Writing and Literary Studies hosts the National Writing Fellowship (formerly National Writers' Workshop) annually. The fellows are graduate students and professionals that are selected based on the merits of their submitted works. The Academia is the international bulletin of the university.

The Tiger Media Network, the university's broadcasting arm, produces content through Tiger TV and Tiger Radio with the use of IPTV and the internet. DZST (860 kHz) was an AM radio station owned by the university from 1950 to 1963. The frequency eventually became the DZRV-AM or Radyo Veritas. In 2013, in partnership with Radio Veritas, the university launched the Blessed Pope John Paul II UST–Radio Veritas electronic community board located at the corner of España Boulevard and Lacson Avenue.

The USTv Students' Choice Awards is an annual award event that recognized TV programs and personalities that promoted Filipino Christian values. In 2026, it was relaunched as the USTV+ Media Excellence Awards.

=== Greek life ===
The Faculty of Civil Law and Faculty of Medicine and Surgery had several Greek organizations on campus. But in 2018, following the death of civil law student Horacio Castillo III, the UST Office of Student Affairs suspended the recognition of all fraternities and sororities. Tau Mu Sigma Phi, founded in 1946, is the oldest among the 10 Greek groups in the Faculty of Medicine and Surgery. Meanwhile, the Gamma Delta Epsilon of the Faculty of Civil Law was founded in February 1948 and has produced two Chief Justices of the Philippines, namely Andres Narvasa and Diosdado Peralta.

== Athletics ==
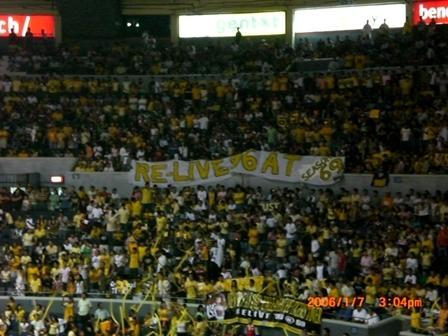
The Thomasian crowd at the Araneta Coliseum during the 2006 UAAP men's basketball finals

In 1920, UST and other catholic universities and colleges in Manila organized a sports league called Liga Catolica. Four years later, members of the Liga Catolica organized themselves to form the National Collegiate Athletic Association (NCAA). UST won its first basketball championship and only NCAA championship in 1930. Two years later, the university seceded from the NCAA and formed the Big 3 League with the University of the Philippines and National University. The Big 3 League and Far Eastern University eventually formed the University Athletic Association of the Philippines (UAAP) in 1938.

The varsity sports teams, originally called the Glowing Goldies, have since been renamed as the Growling Tigers beginning the 1992–1993 UAAP season. The women's teams are called the Tigresses, while the juniors' (high school) teams are the Tiger Cubs.

UST has the most UAAP Overall Championship titles among the eight member schools. As of 2026, UST has won the seniors' division 49 times in the 78 seasons that the title has been awarded, including the record high 14-year run from 1998–2011. The juniors' team yielded 25 titles out of 30 seasons. The university is one of the only four universities that participate in all of the UAAP events. UST has the most championships in baseball, beach volleyball, judo, swimming, taekwondo (kyorugi and poomsae), tennis, and table tennis, or seven out of the 16 sports in the UAAP. UST men's senior teams are the only teams that have won gold in all sports disciplines.

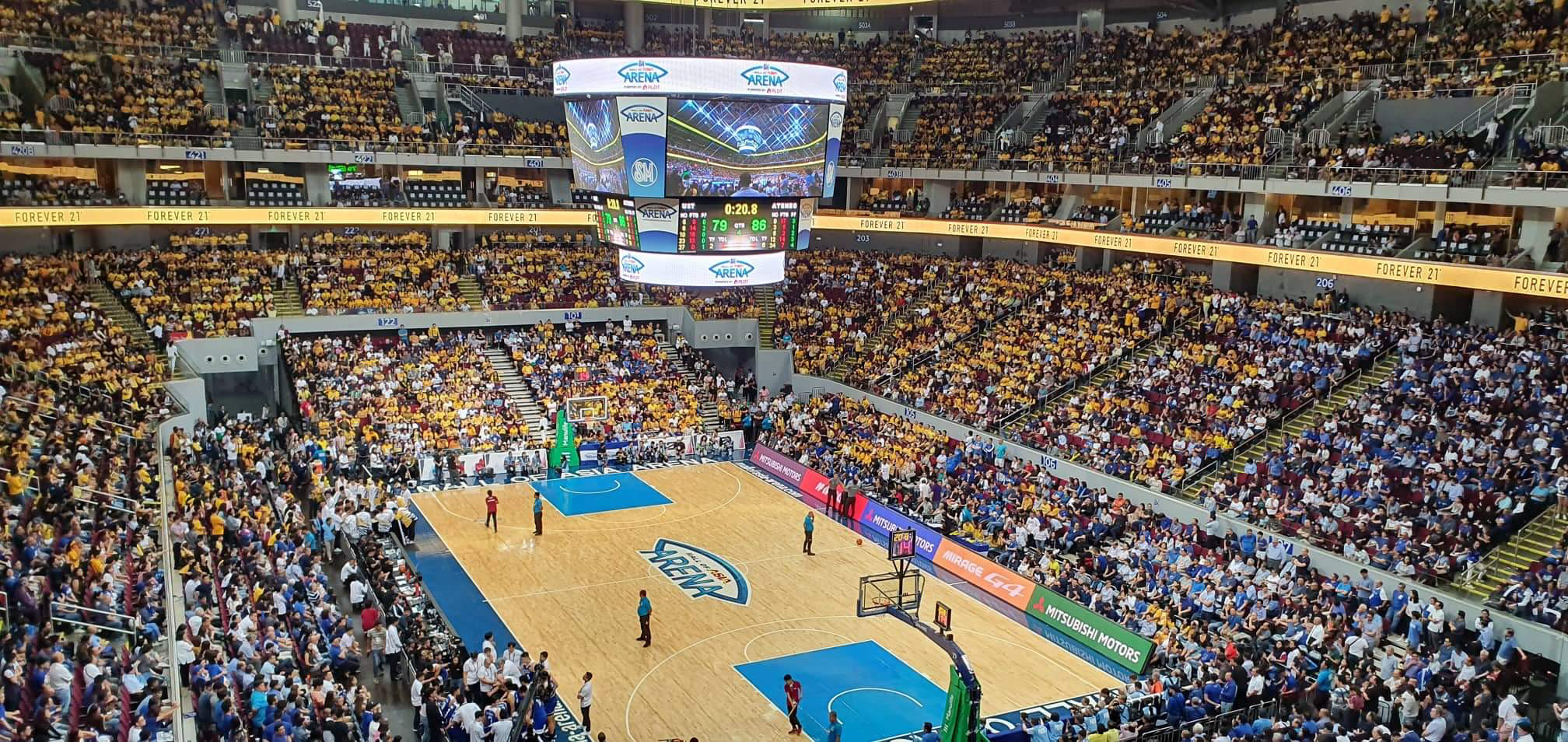
Game 2 of the UST and Ateneo 2019 men's basketball finals at the Mall of Asia Arena in Pasay

UST has won the men's basketball title 18 times in the UAAP since 1938 and one in the NCAA, bringing the total to 19. In 2006, the Tigers captured the basketball championship defeating the Ateneo Blue Eagles in two of the three games held. With the championship, the UST tied with the UE Red Warriors with 18 UAAP men's basketball titles, behind the league-leading FEU Tamaraws with 20. In 2012, the Tigers, led by Jeric Fortuna and Carmelo Afuang, finished second at the end of eliminations with a 10–4 record but were defeated by the Ateneo Blue Eagles in the finals. In 2013, the fourth seed Tigers defeated the top seed National Bulldogs in the semi-finals. The team, led by Jeric Teng and Karim Abdul, won the first game of the finals, but the DLSU Green Archers went on to win the title. In 2015, the Tigers finished the elimination round as the no. 1 seed with an 11–3 record. UST, led by mythical five members Kevin Ferrer and Ed Daquioag, lost in three games to FEU Tamaraws in the finals. In 2019, the Tigers entered the stepladder semifinals with an 8–6 card. It defeated the FEU Tamaraws in a one-game playoff for the third seed. The Tigers, led by Renzo Subido and Soulemane Chabi Yo, defeated the Kobe Paras-led UP Fighting Maroons in two games to face the Ateneo Blue Eagles in the finals. The Eagles won the series in two games. Chabi Yo and Mark Nonoy were recognized as the season's Most Valuable Player and Rookie of the Year respectively.

The Golden Tigresses, the women's volleyball team, rank second in the UAAP with 16 championship titles. Former players include national team members Ging Balse, Aiza Maizo-Pontillas, Maika Ortiz, Dindin Santiago, Sisi Rondina, and Eya Laure. The men's and women's beach volleyball teams have the most championship titles in the same league.

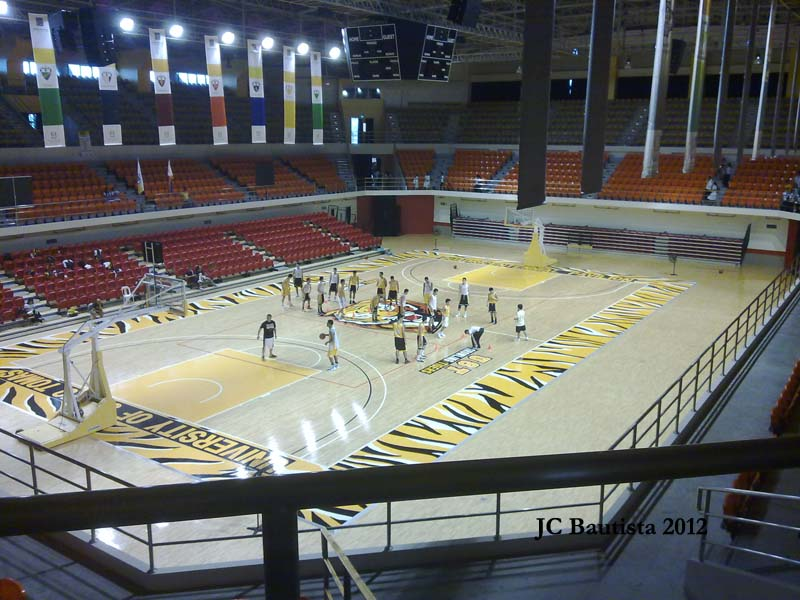
The main court of the Quadricentennial Pavilion

The Tiger Jins have the most number of championships across all divisions in the UAAP.

The Salinggawi Dance Troupe and the UST Yellow Jackets won eight UAAP Cheerdance Competition titles, from 1994 to 1996, and from 2002 to 2006.

Thomasians cheer the Go USTè! chant in supporting the Thomasian athletes on the playing field. UST Yellow Jackets founder Michael Ismael Flores created the iconic chant in 1990, getting inspiration from Vanilla Ice's Ninja Rap.

The university sports facilities include a football field, a swimming pool, a tennis court, a sand court, and at least 10 basketball courts. (Note: The list includes the Quadricentennial Pavilion main arena, three courts at the Practice Gym, a covered court beside the Practice Gym, Education court, P. Noval court, Seminary gym and open courts, and Frassati gym.) The Quadricentennial Pavilion houses a 5,792-seat arena, a fitness center, a two-lane overall track, and training halls for dance, badminton, fencing, judo, and table tennis.

== Notable people ==
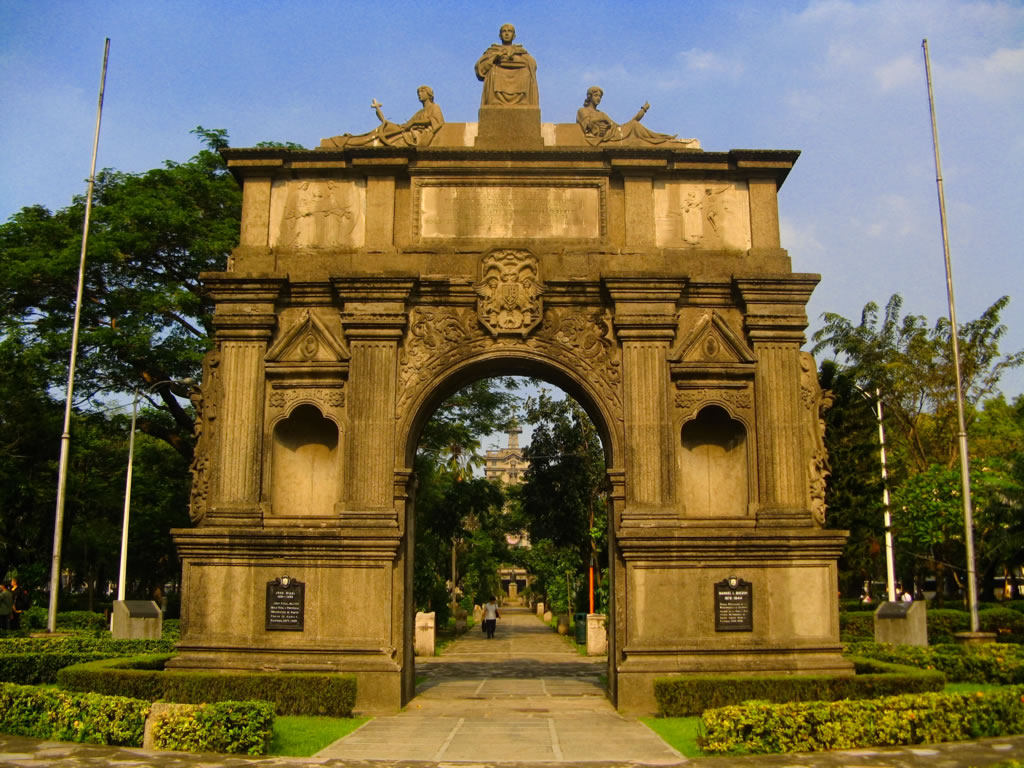
Two of the university's foremost alumni, José Rizal and Manuel L. Quezon, are honored by being displayed on the pillars of the Arch of the Centuries.

Persons affiliated with the university, either as students, faculty members, or administrators, are known as "Thomasians". UST alumni and faculty include 30 canonized Catholic saints, the current master of the Order of Preachers, two cardinals (including the current Archbishop of Manila José Lázaro Fuerte Advíncula Jr., as of March 2023, and José Tomás Sánchez), four presidents of the Philippines (Manuel L. Quezon, José P. Laurel, Sergio Osmeña, and Diosdado Macapagal), former prime minister of Spain Marcelo Azcárraga, 17 senators, nine chief justices, (Note: The list includes, Cayetano Arellano, Victorino Mapa, Manuel Araullo, Ramón Avanceña, Roberto Concepció, Félix Makasiar, Andrés Narvasa, Renato Corona and Diosdado Peralta.) several speaker of the House of Representatives, 22 national artists, (Note: The list includes, but is not limited to, (Visual Arts) Botong Francisco, Victorio Edades, Vicente Manansala, Arturo Luz, Jerry Navarro Elizalde, Ang Kiukok, (Literature) Nick Joaquín, Rolando Tinio, Daisy Avellana, F. Sionil José, Bienvenido Lumbera, Ildefonso P. Santos Jr., Círilo Bautista, (Architecture) Juan Nakpil, Leandro V. Locsín, José María Zaragoza, Francisco Mañosa, Gabriel Formoso, (Film) Gerardo de León, (Music) Ernani Cuenco, Alfredo S. Buenaventura and (Fashion Design) Salvacion Lim Higgins) a national scientist, and five billionaires. (Note: The list includes, but is not limited to, Tony Tan Caktiong, George Ty, Ricardo Po Sr., Vivian Que Azcona, and Carolyn Yao.)

Thomasians in the field of medicine include at least 13 out of 31 previous secretaries of health; (Note: The list includes, but is not limited to, Basílio J. Valdes, José Locsín, Antonio Villarama, Paulino García, Elpidio Valencia, Francisco Q. Duque Jr., Floro Dabu, Manuel Cuenco, Paulino García, Amadeo H. Cruz, Antonio Periquet, Carmencita Reodica, and Francisco Duque III.) the current surgeon general; co-founders of Makati Medical Center Mariano M. Alimurung, José Y. Forés, and Raúl G. Forés; founding chairman of the Asian Hospital and Medical Center Jorge García; Belo Medical Group foundress Vicki Belo; and Aivee Clinic foundress Aivee Teo. May Parsons, a UST Nursing alumna, administered the world's first COVID-19 vaccine to a patient in the United Kingdom.

UST alumni in literature include historians Gregorio F. Zaide, William Henry Scott, Fidel Villarroel, and Jose Victor Torres; writers Nick Joaquin, Paz Latorena, Teodoro Locsin Sr., F. Sionil José, Eugenia Apostol, Bienvenido Lumbera, Ophelia Dimalanta, Cirilo Bautista, Cristina Pantoja-Hidalgo; and philosopher Alfredo Co.

Thomasian alumni in academia include the first Filipino president of the University of the Philippines Ignacio Villamor, the first Filipino dean of UP College of Medicine Fernando Calderon, founder of FEATI University and De La Salle Araneta University Salvador Araneta, founder of Lyceum of the Philippines University José P. Laurel, co-founder of Manila Central University Alejandro M. Albert, founder of Virgen Milagrosa University Foundation Martín Posadas, founder of Manuel S. Enverga University Foundation Manuel Enverga, and founders of University of Perpetual Help System Jose G. Tamayo, Josefina Laperal Tamayo, Antonio Laperal Tamayo.

In sports, UST alumni include Olympians Jethro Dionisio in shooting, Donald Geisler and Tshomlee Go in taekwondo, and Ernest John Obiena in pole vault; PBA's 25 Greatest Players Bogs Adornado and Danny Florencio; and world pool champion Rubilen Amit.

Recipients of the honoris causa include Douglas MacArthur, King Juan Carlos I, Jaime Sin, and Corazon Aquino.

Several highways in Metro Manila are named after Thomasians. These include EDSA, Rizal Avenue, Ortigas Avenue, Quezon Avenue, Gregorio Araneta Avenue, Lacson Avenue, Legarda Street, Victorino Mapa Street, Recto Avenue and Osmeña Highway.

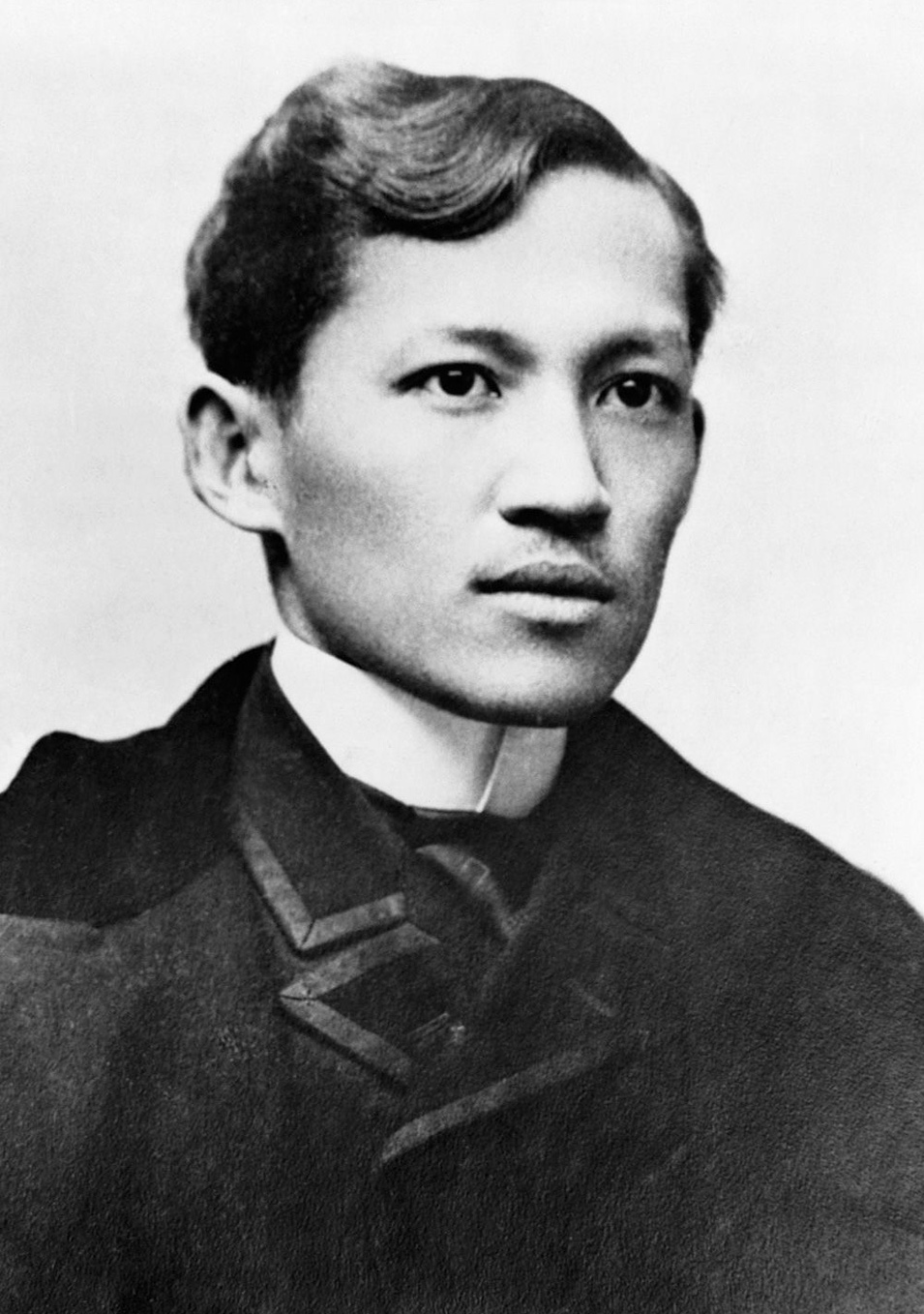
José Rizal

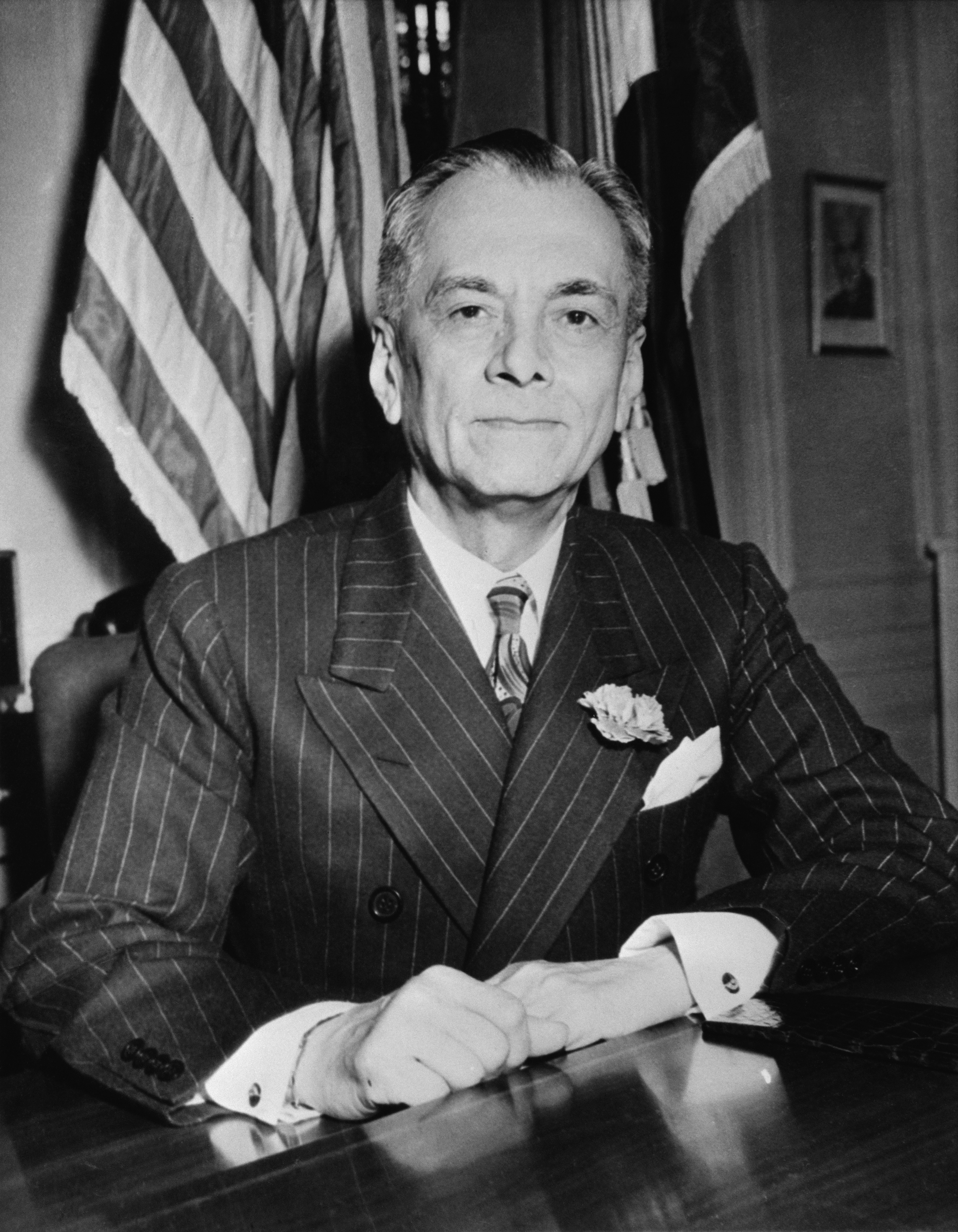
2nd President of the Philippines
Manuel L. Quezon

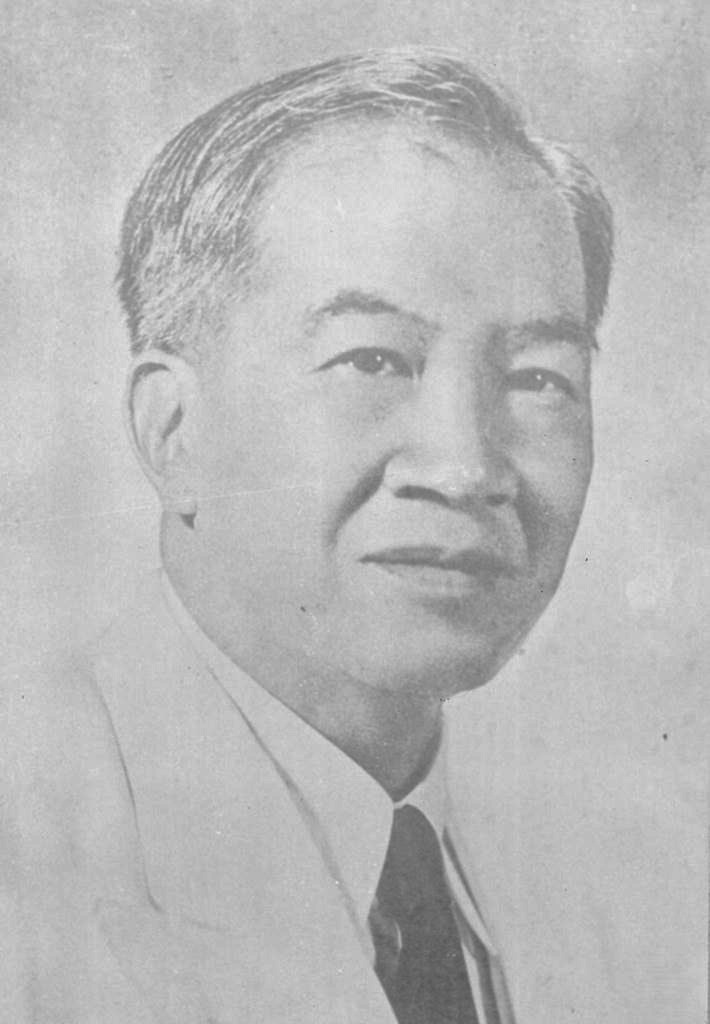
3rd President of the Philippines
José P. Laurel

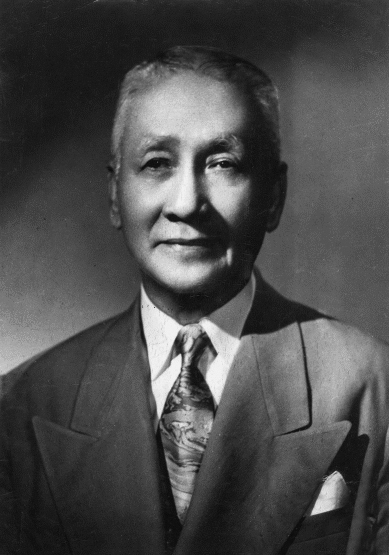
4th President of the Philippines
Sergio Osmena

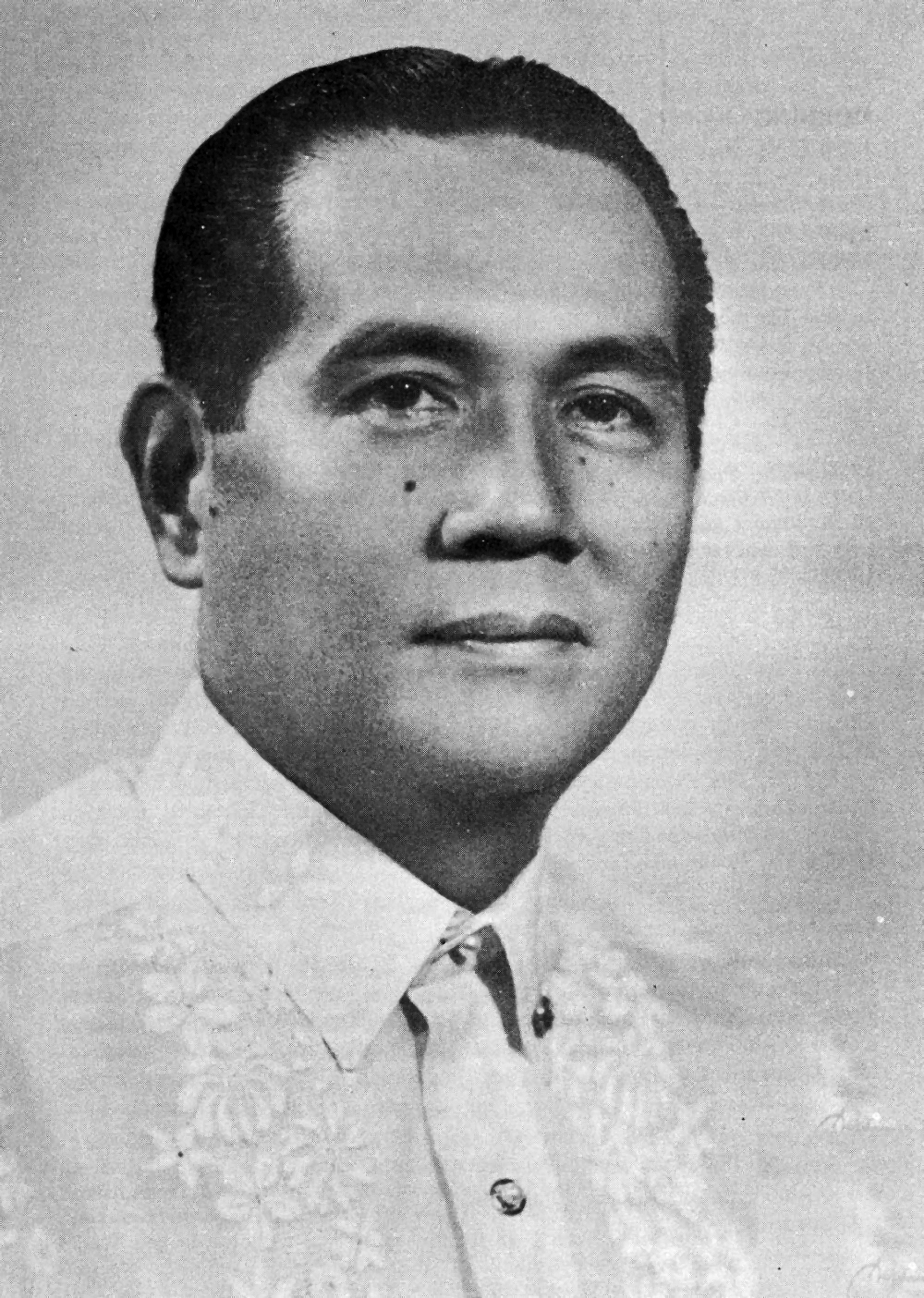
9th President of the Philippines
Diosdado Macapagal

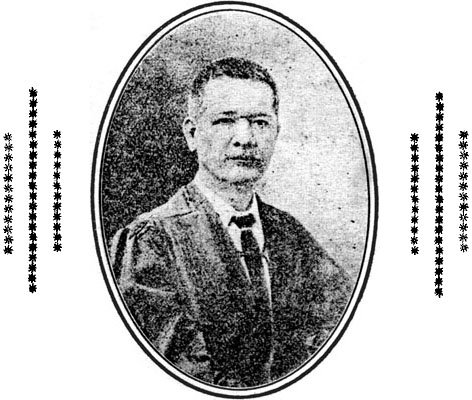
1st Chief Justice of the Supreme Court of the Philippines
Cayetano Arellano

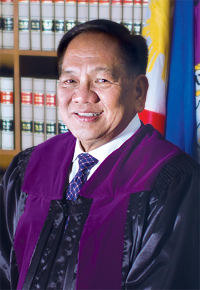
26th Chief Justice of the Supreme Court of the Philippines
Diosdado Peralta

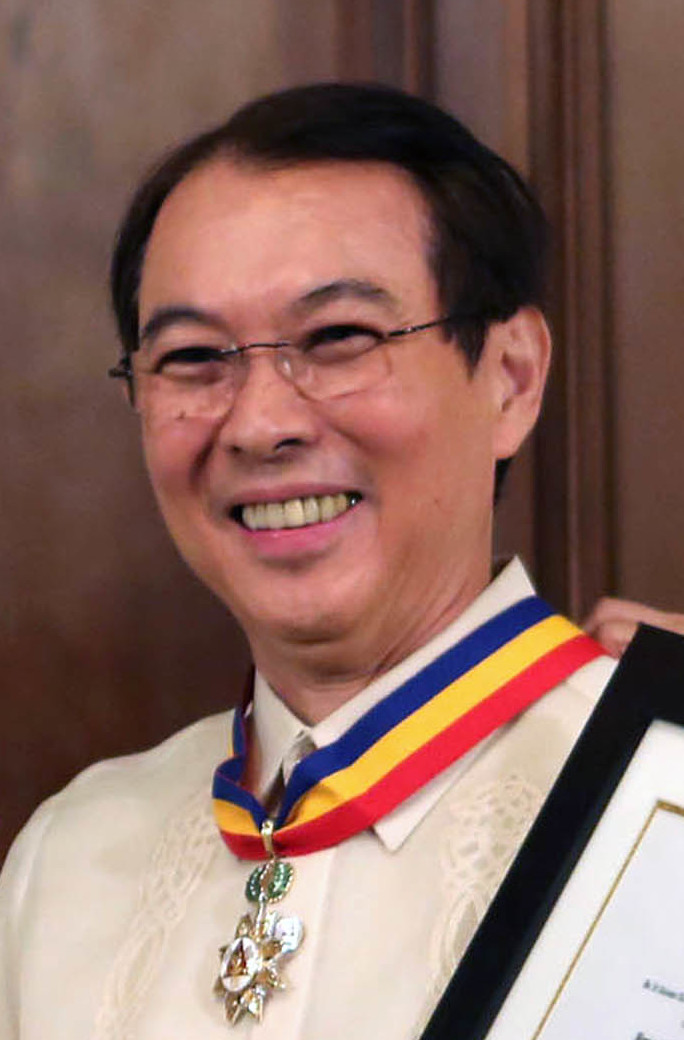
Founder and Chairman of Jollibee Foods Corporation
Tony Tan-Caktiong

== In popular culture ==
The UST campus and Thomasians have been subjects in popular culture, including works of film, television, and literature.

=== Film ===
Thomasians in films are frequently featured as alumni or students of architecture, biology, and medicine.

- Minsan Pa Nating Hagkan Ang Nakaraan (1983): Rodrigo Ocampo, portrayed by Christopher De Leon, is an AB Architecture graduate.
- Kung Aagawin Mo Ang Lahat Sa Akin (1987): Maureen Andrada, portrayed by Sharon Cuneta, and co-actors, Tonton Gutierrez and Ali Sotto are biology students.
- The Vizconde Massacre Story (God Help Us!) (1993)
- The Untold Story: Vizconde Massacre II - May The Lord Be With Us!) (1994)
- Pare Ko (1995): Chipper portrayed by Jao Mapa is seen wearing a yellow and black UST jacket at the end of the movie.
- Madrasta (1996): A UST diploma is seen at Fides' house, portrayed by Nida Blanca.
- Super Ranger Kids (1997)
- Dahil ba sa Kanya (1998): Mitch Carmona, portrayed by Mikee Cojuangco-Jaworski is a medical student.
- Jose Rizal (1998): The original entrance to the campus of UST in Intramuros, which would later become the Arch of the Centuries is featured in one of Rizal's flashbacks.
- Batas ng Lansangan (2002): Marissa, portrayed by Kaye Abad, a student from the Faculty of Arts and Letters, meets Dina Bonnevie, a university professor at the Plaza Benavides.
- Magkapatid (2002): Dr. Cita Reyes, portrayed by Sharon Cuneta, receives recognition as an alumna from Eastern University in the Thomas Aquinas Research Complex auditorium. The fictional Eastern University uses the UST Hospital logo .
- One More Chance (2007): Basha, portrayed by Bea Alonzo, wears the UST Salinggawi Dance Troupe's 2003 cheerdance competition costume. She is an architecture alumnus, while Popoy, portrayed by John Lloyd Cruz, is an engineering alumnus.
- Ang Tanging Ina N'yong Lahat (2008): Ina Montecillo, portrayed by Ai-Ai delas Alas, attends a class set in the UST Main Building. She meets Ren Constantino, a university professor, played by Cherry Pie Picache. Both characters become presidents of the country.
- And I Love You So (2009): At the beginning of the movie, Lara Cruz, portrayed by Bea Alonzo, sits on the balcony of the AMV building.
- Yesterday, Today, Tomorrow (2011): Eunice, portrayed by Eula Caballero, wears the UST High School student and the UST Salinggawi Dance Troupe's 2011 cheerdance competition costume.
- Who's That Girl (2011): Elizabeth Pedroza and Monique, portrayed by Anne Curtis and Candy Pangilinan, study architecture at the university. John Eduque, portrayed by Luis Manzano, is first seen wearing a blue UST Science jersey but then changes into the College of Commerce and Business Administration uniform.
- Isa Pa with Feelings (2019): Mara Navarro, played by Maine Mendoza, is an architecture alumnus.
- Alone/Together (2019): Raf, played by Enrique Gil, is a biology and medicine alumnus. Gil also appeared in a video cheering the Go USTè! chant as part of the promotional campaign of the movie.
- Bar Boys (2017)
- Time & Again (2019): Apolonia 'Apol', played by Teresita Marquez, is a graduate of AB Humanities. AB Humanities is not offered in the university in reality.
- GomBurZa (2023)

=== Television ===
- Sprite commercial entitled Fanatic (2001): Toni Gonzaga, Aubrey Miles, and Mariel Rodriguez portrayed students who met Piolo Pascual in a campus fair.
- Chippy commercial entitled Initiation (2010)
- The ABS-CBN Christmas Station ID (2010) entitled Ngayong Pasko Magniningning Ang Pilipino features the UST Singers, the Seminary Gym, UST Open Field, Thomas Aquinas Research Complex, and the Education and Medicine auditoriums.
- A Beautiful Affair (2013): Napoleon "Leon" Riego, portrayed by John Lloyd Cruz, attends the UST High School, and subsequently, the UST College of Architecture
- Globe Prepaid GoUNLI20 commercial (2014)
- Ilustrado TV series (2014): Episodes 6 and 7 depict the student life of José Rizal in UST in 1877.
- A Second Chance TV promotion (2015): Popoy and Basha show support for the UST Growling Tigers for the second game of the 2015 UAAP Season 78 Men's basketball finals.
- Maalaala Mo Kaya M.V.P. episode (2019): The episode features the life story of UST volleyball player Sisi Rondina. Rondina is portrayed by Kim Chiu. Coaches KungFu and Paul Doloiras are portrayed by Gerald Madrid and Boom Labrusca respectively. Dimdim Pacres, one of Rondina's teammates, is portrayed by Mara Lopez.
- Tide 4-in-1 commercial (2022)
- The Rain In España (2023): The TV series is an adaptation of the first book of the Wattpad novel University Series by Gwy Saludes. In the novel, Luna Valera and Avianna Diaz, played on television by Heaven Peralejo and Bea Binene, are UST students studying architecture. Avianna Diaz is also the main protagonist of the novel Golden Scenery of Tomorrow. Sevi Camero, portrayed by Gab Lagman, is also the main protagonist of the novel Chasing in the Wild. In the original story, he studies engineering and is captain of the UST Growling Tigers.
- I Love You Since 1892 (2026)

=== Literature ===
- El Filibusterismo (1891 novel): Father Millon and Placido Penitente are a professor and a student in the university respectively.
- I Love You Since 1892 (2018): The novel's protagonist, Carmela Montecarlo, is a student of the university in present day. The Arch of the Centuries also prominently appears in the story.
