= Thomas Aquinas Research Complex =

Filipino research institute

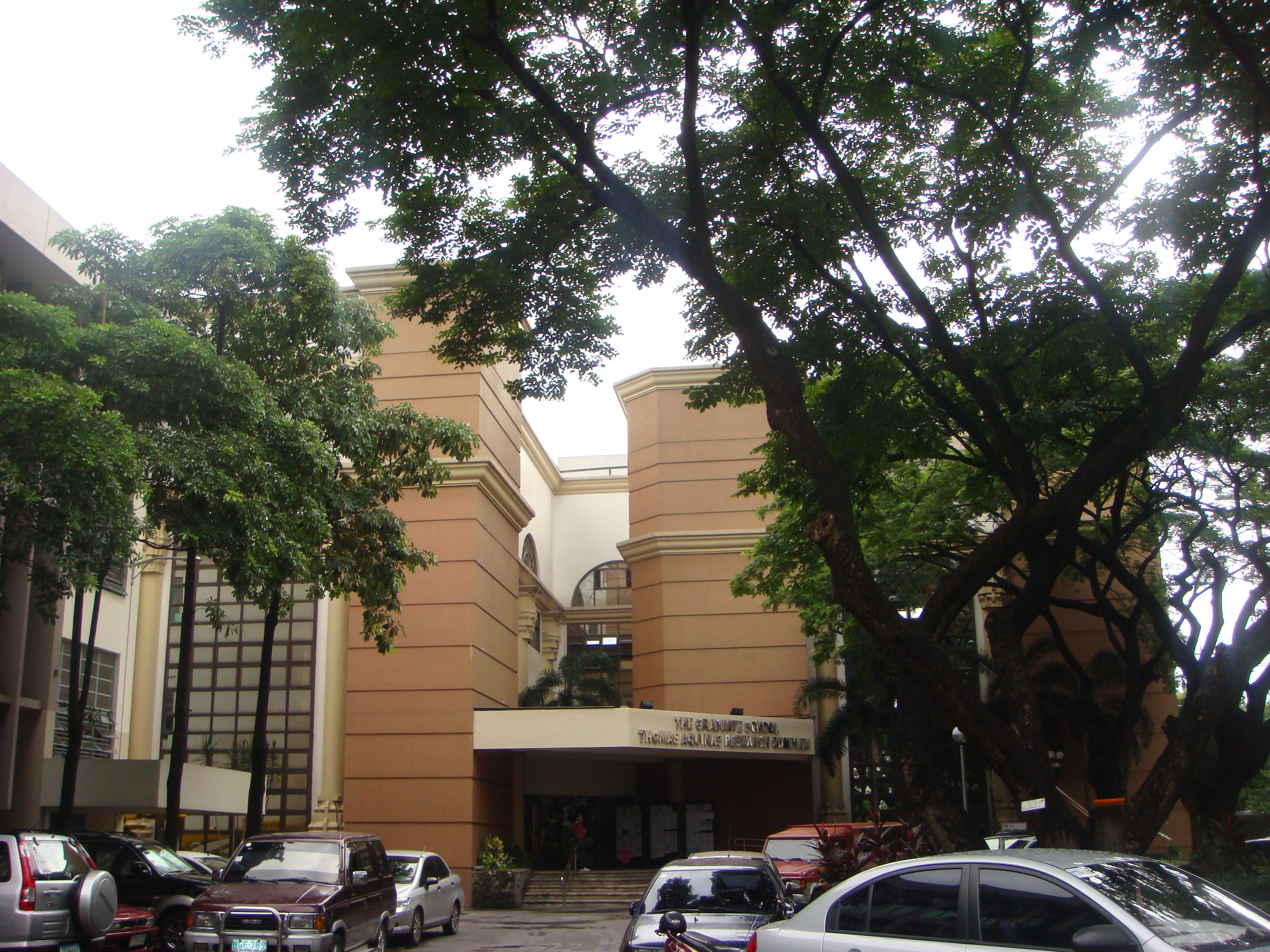
- Type: Research Center
- Established: November 15, 2001; 24 years ago
- Location: Manila, Philippines; 14°36′37″N 120°59′14″E
- Campus: Urban

The Thomas Aquinas Research Complex (TARC) is the main venue for research in the University of Santo Tomas in Manila, Philippines. The building houses several research centers, laboratories, and the UST Graduate School.

== History ==
As early as 1992, plans for the construction of a university research complex were already in place. Construction was planned to begin by 1995 but the actual groundbreaking only happened on June 28, 1999. Designed by former College of Architecture and Fine Arts Dean Yolanda Reyes, the research complex was inaugurated on November 15, 2001. The four-story building houses laboratory rooms, a 216-seater auditorium, seminar and conference rooms.

== Design ==
The TARC building incorporates the UST Main building's capital and base to its columns. It also includes parapets or overhanging wall portions to cover its sloping roof.

== Research centers ==
The research centers housed in TARC include:

- The Center for Conservation of Cultural Property and Environment in the Tropics was established in 2003 to advance research and advocacy on heritage conservation and sustainable development.
- Center for Theology, Religious Studies, and Ethics
- The Research Center for the Natural Sciences and Applied Sciences (RCNAS) includes several service units.
  - The UST Analytical Services Laboratory (UST-ASL), established in 2010, provides physicochemical analytical services and various technical services for samples of research study and industrial importance. UST is the first university in the philippines to receive a certificate of authority to operate in 2019.
  - UST Collection of Microbial Strains (UST-CMS), established in 2003, maintains locally isolated marine luminous bacteria, clinical bacterial isolates, filamentous fungi and yeasts of terrestrial and marine origin, microalgae and Streptomyces.
  - The UST Herbarium (USTH) offers curation, accession and storage of plant herbarium, identification of plant specimens, and training on herbarium curation and database management.
  - The Thomasian Angiosperm Phylogeny and Barcoding Group (TAPBG) is a research team that focuses on studying the biodiversity of Philippine Rubiaceae and medicinal plants.
  - UST Institutional Animal Care & Use Committee (UST-IACUC)
  - UST Institutional Biosafety Committee (UST-IBC)
  - UST Mammalian Tissue Culture Laboratory (UST-MTCL)
  - UST RCNAS Occupational Safety and Health Committee (UST RCNAS OSHC)
- Research Center for Social Sciences and Education (RCSSED)
- Innovation and Technology Support Office (ITSO)

== Research centers not located in TARC ==
- Center for Creative Writing and Literary Studies (CCWLS) - Benavides Building
- Center for Health Research and Movement Science (CHRMS) - St. Martin de Porres Building
- Research Center for Culture, Arts, and Humanities (RCCAH) - Central Laboratory Building
- The Research Center for Health Sciences (RCHS) is the research arm of the Faculty of Medicine and Surgery. It will be housed in the Henry Sy Sr. Hall.
- The UST Zooplankton Ecology, Systematics, and Limnology Laboratory, located at the UST Central Laboratory Building, is home to the first and only organized assemblage of zooplankton samples and specimens collected within the Philippines. The Philippine Zooplankton Reference Collection, established in 2011, is an essential tool in documenting zooplankton diversity, distribution, and ecology in the Philippine inland waters.

== Takayama Statue ==
The statue of Japanese samurai-saint Justo Takayama stands at the entrance of the building. A new marker that narrates Takayama's catholic devotion was unveiled in March 2017, a month after Takayama was beatified in Osaka, Japan.
