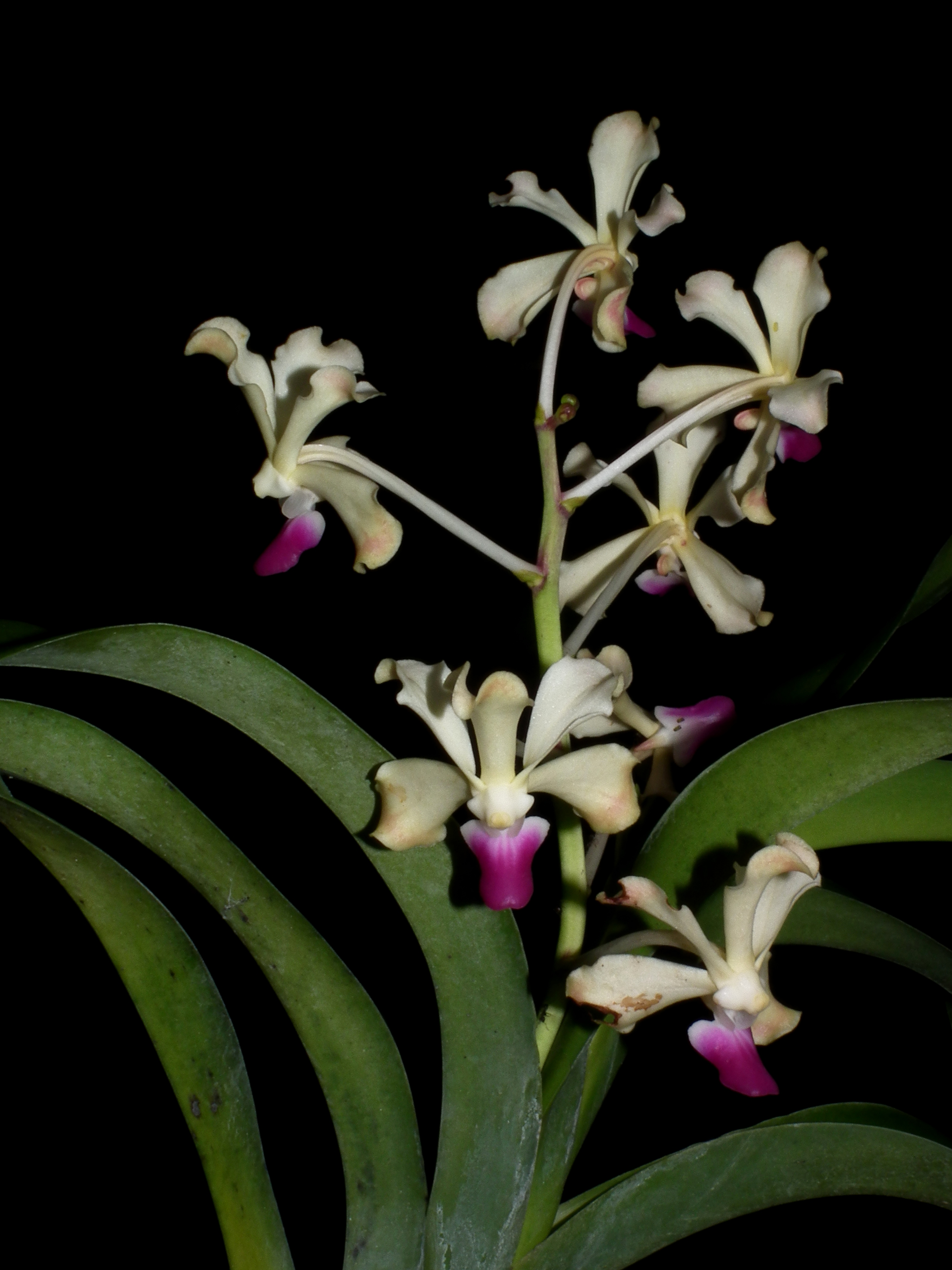

Scientific classification
- Kingdom: Plantae
- Clade: Tracheophytes
- Clade: Angiosperms
- Clade: Monocots
- Order: Asparagales
- Family: Orchidaceae
- Subfamily: Epidendroideae
- Genus: Vanda
- Species: V. ustii

Binomial name
- Vanda ustii Golamco, Claustro & de Mesa

Synonyms
- Vanda luzonica var immaculata

= Vanda ustii =

Species of orchid

Vanda ustii, the University of Santo Tomas' vanda, is an orchid species found only in the Philippines. It is named after the University of Santo Tomas or U.S.T.
