= List of medical schools in the Philippines =

This is a list of medical schools located in the Philippines.

== Metro Manila ==
City of Manila

- Centro Escolar University - School of Medicine
  San Miguel, Manila City
- Chinese General Hospital Colleges - College of Medicine
  Sampaloc, Manila City
- Emilio Aguinaldo College - College of Medicine
  Ermita, Manila City
- Manila Theological College - College of Medicine
  Sampaloc, Manila City
- Metropolitan Medical Center - College of Arts, Sciences and Technology - College of Medicine
  Santa Cruz, Manila City
- Pamantasan ng Lungsod ng Maynila - College of Medicine
  Intramuros, Manila City
- San Beda University - College of Medicine
  San Miguel, Manila City
- University of Santo Tomas - Faculty of Medicine and Surgery
  Sampaloc, Manila City
- University of the Philippines - College of Medicine
  Ermita, Manila Ciry

Caloocan

- Manila Central University - Filemon D. Tanchoco Sr. Medical Foundation
  Caloocan City

Las Piñas

- University of Perpetual Help System Dalta - JONELTA Foundation School of Medicine
  Las Piñas City

Makati

- AMA College of Medicine
  Makati City

Muntinlupa

- Pamantasan ng Lungsod ng Muntinlupa - College of Medicine Muntinlupa City

Pasig

- Ateneo de Manila University - School of Medicine and Public Health
  Ortigas Center, Pasig City

Quezon City

- Far Eastern University - Nicanor Reyes Medical Foundation
  West Fairview, Quezon City
- New Era University - College of Medicine
  New Era, Quezon City
- Our Lady of Fatima University-Quezon City Campus - College of Medicine
  Greater Lagro, Quezon City
- St. Luke's College of Medicine - William H. Quasha Memorial Foundation
  Quezon City
- University of the East - Ramon Magsaysay Memorial Medical Center
  Quezon City

Valenzuela

- Our Lady of Fatima University-Valenzuela Campus - College of Medicine
  Valenzuela City

== North and Central Luzon ==
- Angeles University Foundation - College of Medicine
  Angeles City
- Bataan Peninsula State University - College of Medicine
  Balanga City, Bataan
- Bulacan State University - College of Medicine
  San Rafael, Bulacan
- Cagayan State University - College of Medicine
  Tuguegarao City, Cagayan
- Isabela State University - College of Medicine and Allied Health Professions
  Echague, Isabela
- La Consolacion University Philippines - College of Medicine
  Malolos City, Bulacan
- Lyceum-Northwestern University - Dr. Francisco Q. Duque Medical Foundation
  Dagupan City, Pangasinan
- Mariano Marcos State University - College of Medicine
  Batac, Ilocos Norte
- Saint Louis University - School of Medicine
  Baguio City
- St. Paul University Philippines - School of Medicine
  Tuguegarao City, Cagayan
- The Manila Times College of Subic - School of MedicineSubic, Zambales
- University of Northern Philippines - College of Medicine
  Vigan City, Ilocos Sur
- Virgen Milagrosa University Foundation - College of Medicine
  San Carlos City, Pangasinan
- Pines City Colleges - School of Medicine. Be a Warrior Be a PCCian Doctor
  Baguio City
- PLTCI-College of Medicine
  Solano, Nueva Vizcaya
- Wesleyan University Philippines - College of Medicine
  Cabanatuan, Nueva Ecija

== South Luzon ==
- Adventist University of the Philippines - College of Medicine
  Silang, Cavite
- Batangas State University - College of Medicine
  Batangas City, Batangas
- Bicol Christian College of Medicine - Ago Medical and Educational Center
  Legazpi City, Albay
- Bicol University - College of Medicine
  Legazpi City, Albay
- Cavite State University - College of Medicine
  Indang, Cavite
- De La Salle Medical and Health Sciences Institute - College of Medicine
  Dasmariñas City, Cavite
- Philippine Muslim-Christian College of Medicine
  Antipolo City, Rizal
- Southern Luzon State University - College of Medicine
  Lucban, Quezon
- University of Perpetual Help Rizal - Calamba Campus
  Calamba City, Laguna
- University of Perpetual Help - Dr. Jose G. Tamayo Medical University
  Biñan City, Laguna
- Lyceum of the Philippines University - St. Cabrini College of Health and Sciences - College of Medicine
  Santo Tomas City, Batangas
- Palawan State University - School of Medicine

Puerto Princesa City, Palawan

== Visayas ==
- Bohol Island State University - School of Medicine
  Tagbilaran City, Bohol
- Cebu Doctors' University - College of Medicine
  Mandaue City
- Cebu Institute of Medicine
  Cebu City
- Cebu Normal University - Vicente Sotto Memorial Medical Center College of Medicine
  Cebu City
- Central Philippine University - College of Medicine
  Jaro, Iloilo City
- Iloilo Doctors' College of Medicine
  Molo, Iloilo City
- Matias H. Aznar Memorial College of Medicine
  Cebu City
- Remedios T. Romualdez Medical School Foundation - College of Medicine
  Tacloban City
- Samar Island Institute of Medicine - Samar State University
  Catbalogan City, Samar
- Silliman University Medical School
  Dumaguete City, Negros Oriental
- Southwestern University - School of Medicine
  Cebu City
- University of Cebu - School of Medicine
  Mandaue City
- University of Saint La Salle - College of Medicine
  Bacolod City
- University of the Philippines School of Health Sciences
  Palo, Leyte
- University of the Visayas - Gullas College of Medicine
  Mandaue City
- West Visayas State University - College of Medicine
  La Paz, Iloilo City

== Mindanao ==
- Ateneo de Zamboanga University - School of Medicine
  Zamboanga City
- Brokenshire College - School of Medicine
  Davao City
- Davao Medical School Foundation
  Davao City
- DMC College Foundation Inc. - Alberto P. Concha - School of Medicine
  Dipolog City, Zamboanga del Norte
- Jose Maria College - School of Medicine
  Davao City
- Liceo de Cagayan University - College of Medicine
  Cagayan de Oro City
- Mindanao State University - College of Medicine
  Marawi City, Lanao del Sur
- Mindanao State University - College of Medicine
  General Santos City
- Sultan Kudarat State University - College of Medicine
  Tacurong City, Sultan Kudarat
- University of Science and Technology of Southern Philippines - College of Medicine
  Cagayan De Oro City
- University of Southern Mindanao - College of Medicine
  Kabacan, Cotabato
- University of Southeastern Philippines - School of Medicine
  Tagum City, Davao del Norte
- Western Mindanao State University - College of Medicine
  Zamboanga City
- Xavier University - Dr. José P. Rizal School of Medicine
  Cagayan de Oro City

== See also ==
- List of medical schools
- Medical education in the Philippines
- Medical school
