= Medical education in the Philippines =

Medical education in Philippines is principally offered and developed by accredited and government recognized medical schools in the country.

Medical schools in the Philippines are professional schools offering the Doctor of Medicine (M.D.) degree. The M.D. is a four-year and six months professional degree program which qualifies the degree holder to take the licensure exam for medical doctors in the Philippines.

Health professionals are one of the biggest exports of the Philippines and a significant source of tax revenue for the government which subsidises medical education.

== History ==
Formal medical education was introduced in the Philippines by the Spaniards through University of Santo Tomas “Facultad de Medicina y Farmacia” on May 28, 1871. The undergraduate curriculum was patterned after the Spanish medical system which consisted of 6 years of undergraduate study and 1 year of internship. Following the government transition under the American commonwealth system in the late 20th century, the medical curriculum was transformed and patterned after the American curriculum.

== Admission to medical schools ==
Before applying to any medical school, a candidate must earn a bachelor's degree with credits in certain required subjects. A candidate must be at least 18 years of age. The most common pre-medical degrees include biology, psychology, pharmacy, medical technology, biochemistry, microbiology, nursing, radiologic technology and physical therapy.

In addition, a candidate must take the National Medical Admission Test (NMAT), the national entrance exam for all medical schools in the Philippines.

Foreign students may apply and attend medical school in the Philippines. NMAT and bachelor's degree are required for admission to the medical program. Students from countries with direct entrance programs to medicine without a bachelor's degree, such as countries that follow the British system of training, are required to attend a two-year pre-medical program that leads to a bachelor's degree in biology. The pre-medical degree for foreign students is typically conducted online. Once deemed eligible for application to medical school, applicants must pass a background screening, medical exam, and interview prior to admission to the program.

== Undergraduate Medical Education ==
The Doctor of Medicine (M.D.) is a four-year professional degree program dealing with medical theories, practices, technologies, and problem solving. The curriculum is patterned after the American-system. The first year is composed of basic sciences courses including Anatomy, Physiology, Biochemistry, Cell Biology (Histology), Embryology, Microbiology, Immunology, Neuroscience, and Pharmacology. Introduction to medicine courses are also thought such as physical exam, interviewing skills, and research. The second year is composed of organ-based abnormal physiology (pathophysiology) courses such as Gastroenterology, Pulmonology, Cardiology, Ophthalmology, Hematology/Oncology, Nephrology, Obstetrics/Gynecology, Dermatology, Psychiatry, Orthopedics, Neurology, and Urology. Students in their second year are also introduced to limited clinical rotations in clinics/hospitals to supplement theoretical knowledge. The third year is composed of rotations in different inpatient and outpatient departments such as Surgery, Obstetrics/Gynecology, Neurology, Internal Medicine, Psychiatry, Pediatrics, and Family medicine. The fourth year is composed of subspecialty rotations such as neurosurgery, dermatology, otolaryngology, orthopedics, ophthalmology, urology, cardiology, critical care, emergency medicine, and forensic medicine/pathology.

== Philippine medical schools ==
Medical schools in the country are regulated by the Commission on Higher Education (CHED) of the Philippines. Voluntary accreditation are granted by the Philippine Accrediting Association of Schools, Colleges, and Universities but are not necessary for medical schools to operate. PAASCU is recognized by the World Federation of Medical Education (WFME), an affiliate of the World Health Organization, to accredit medical schools for inclusion in the WFME directory of medical schools.

=== Partial List of CHED-approved Medical Schools ===
Medical programs are regulated and approved by the Commission on Higher Education (CHED) of the Philippines which is the government regulatory agency for higher education in the Philippines. Each medical schools may undergo voluntary accreditation by the Philippine Association of Schools, Colleges, and Universities (PAASCU) which is a non-governmental organization tasked to ensure quality in basic medical education. Currently, not all medical schools in the Philippines are accredited by the PAASCU but are approved to operate by CHED. Several medical schools are currently under review for accreditation by PAASCU. Approval by CHED to operate a medical education course is necessary for medical schools to offer an M.D. course. Programs approved by CHED are recognized by WFME, WHO, and Medical Board of California. Most medical schools in the Philippines are members of the Association of Philippine Medical Colleges which is a non-governmental association that provides technical support to each medical schools and administer the ENIPS internship matching service.

Name	Dean	Location
University of Perpetual Help – Dr. Jose G. Tamayo Medical University	Winnie P. Siao, M.D.	Biñan, Laguna
Angeles University Foundation School of Medicine	Evelyn B. Yumiaco, M.D.	Angeles, Pampanga
Manila Theological College-College of Medicine	May Emmeline B. Montellano, M.D.	Manga Ave., Manila
Manila Central University College of Medicine	Lilybeth R. Tanchoco, M.D.	Caloocan
Our Lady of Fatima University	Reynaldo A. Olazo, M.D.	Valenzuela
Pamantasan ng Lungsod ng Maynila	Angeline D. Alabastro, M.D.	Intramuros, Manila
San Beda University, College of Medicine	Fernandino Jose A. Fontanilla, M.D.	Mendiola, Manila
St. Luke's College of Medicine – William H. Quasha Memorial	Susan Pelea Nagtalon, M.D.	Sta. Ignacia St., Quezon City
UERMMMC College of Medicine	Norbert Lingling D. Uy, M.D.	Aurora Blvd., Quezon City
Brokenshire College School of Medicine	Melchorita S. Salvador, PhD	Davao City
University of Santo Tomas Faculty of Medicine and Surgery	Ma. Lourdes Domingo-Maglinao, M.D.	España, Manila
University of the Philippines College of Medicine	Agnes Mejia, M.D.	Pedro Gil, Manila
Far Eastern University - Nicanor Reyes Medical Foundation	Rey Delos Reyes, MD	West Fairview, Quezon City
Pines City Colleges, School of Medicine ]]		Baguio, Benguet
Saint Louis University International School of Medicine	John Anthony A. Domantay, M.D.	Baguio, Benguet
Lyceum-Northwestern University Dr. Francisco Q. Duque Medical Foundation	Ellen Manzano, M.D.	Dagupan, Pangasinan
University of Northern Philippines	Pablo R. Quedado, M.D.	Vigan, Ilocos Sur
Virgen Milagrosa University Foundation	Aurora R. Espinoza, M.D.	San Carlos, Pangasinan
Cagayan State University	Antonino Paguirigan M.D.	Tuguegarao, Cagayan
De La Salle Medical and Health Sciences Institute	Madeleine M. Sosa, M.D.	Dasmariñas, Cavite
Bicol University College of Medicine	Ofelia Samar Sy, M.D.	Legazpi, Albay
Central Philippine University College of Medicine	Glenn A. M. Catedral, M.D.	Iloilo City
Iloilo Doctors' College of Medicine	Ludovico Jurao, M.D.	Iloilo City
University of St. La Salle	Ricardo Gallaga, M.D.	Bacolod, Negros Occidental
West Visayas State University	Joselito F. Villaruz, M.D.	Iloilo City
Cebu Doctors' University	Enrico B. Gruet, M.D.	Cebu City
Cebu Institute of Medicine	Thelma L. Fernandez, M.D.	Cebu City
Silliman University Medical School	Jonathan C. Amante, M.D.	Dumaguete, Negros Oriental
Southwestern University (Philippines)	Peter S. Aznar, M.D.	Urgello St., Cebu City
St Paul University Philippines	Geraldine Ramirez M.D.	Tuguegarao City
Matias H. Aznar Memorial College of Medicine Inc.	Arlene M. Diaz, M.D.	Redemptorist Plaza, Camputhaw, Cebu City
University of the Visayas Gullas College of Medicine	Niño Ismael S. Pastor, M.D.	Mandaue, Cebu
Remedios Trinidad Romualdez Medical School Foundation	Ma. Elvira G. Casal, M.D.	Tacloban, Leyte
University of the Philippines School of Health Sciences in Leyte	Salvador Isidro B. Destura, M.D.	Palo, Leyte
Mindanao State University College of Medicine	Cristina D. Achacoso, M.D.	Iligan, Lanao del Norte
Xavier University – Ateneo de Cagayan Dr. Jose P. Rizal School of Medicine	Ruth S. Beltran, M.D.	Cagayan de Oro, Misamis Oriental
Davao Medical School Foundation	Erwin Rommel N. Hontiveros, M.D.	Bajada, Davao City

== Graduate Medical Education ==
Graduate medical education programs are composed of residency and fellowship programs. These specialty programs are offered jointly by medical schools in partnership with hospitals or independently by private/public hospitals. Medical graduates are referred to as residents or fellows depending on their education level. Residents are physicians (M.D.) who are in an internship or residency program. Fellows are physicians who have completed a residency program in their primary specialty (ie, Anesthesia, Surgery, Internal Medicine...) who are pursuing subspecialty training. Residency and fellowship curriculum include didactics (lectures, grand rounds, morbidity and mortality conferences) and practical exercises (clinical simulation, skills/procedures training on a manikin or standardized patient) in a classroom, simulation lab, and clinical laboratory settings. Trainees in a GME program are given progressive level of responsibility and increasing level of independent practice depending on their post-graduate year/level. The program may require the presentation and defense of a graduate-level thesis, an independent research project, or supervised professional practice as a final graduation requirement. The entire academic program may last from one year to five years, depending on the requirements of the curriculum; the demands of the institution; and the academic load, availability, and dedication of the individual student.

== Internship ==
A general medicine/surgery internship is compulsory to obtain a medical license in the Philippines. Medical graduates must spend one-year in general medicine, pediatrics, or surgery prior to entering residency. Internships are usually integrated with residency programs, however, medical graduates may complete their internship and residency at different institutions. Medical students must apply through a national matching service called ENIPS, similar to the American system called NRMP. An algorithm will match applicants to different partnering institutions based on a ranking system. Medical graduates who have completed an internship may obtain a license to practice independently as a general practitioner or pursue further training by applying to residency programs.

=== Medical specialization ===
Medical specialization is obtained by Filipino physicians by completing a residency program. Sub-specialization is obtained by completing a fellowship program. Candidates for sub-specialization may begin application to fellowship programs during the last year of residency or after completion of the residency program. Duration of residency and fellowship programs vary from three to six years depending on the specialty. General medical specialties such as internal medicine, pediatrics, family medicine are typically three years. Anesthesia, Psychiatry, Obstetrics and Gynecology, Pathology, Dermatology, Ophthalmology, and Neurology are four years. Surgical specialties such as Orthopedics, General surgery, Urology, Otolaryngology are five years. After completion of a residency and/or fellowship program, a specialty candidate must take a specialty board examination conducted by each respective specialty such as the Philippine Board of Psychiatry, Philippine Board of Pediatrics, Philippine Board of Surgery, Philippine Specialty Board of Internal Medicine, Philippine Academy of Family Physicians Board of Examiners… The Philippine medical education curriculum follows the American system of training in all specialties. As such, specialty programs exist in all areas of medicine such as A) Pediatrics and internal medicine: cardiology, pulmonology, gastroenterology, endocrinology, infectious disease, oncology etc. B) Surgery: thoracic and cardiovascular, pediatric, transplant, trauma, minimally invasive, oncology C) Anesthesiology: pain, cardiovascular D) OB Gyn: oncology, ultrasound, reproductive endocrinology and infertility.

=== Graduate degrees ===
Advanced non-medical and non-clinical graduate degrees such as a Master of Public Health, Master of Health Services Administration, Ph.D. in biomedical sciences... may be conferred with an M.D. degree by applying to a combined dual-degree medical program (i.e. MD-PhD, MD-MBA, MD-MS, MD-MPH).

== Philippine Physician Licensure Examination ==
The licensure exams for physicians (board exam for doctors) are administered by the Philippine Board of Medicine, a professional regulatory body under the general control and supervision of the Professional Regulation Commission (PRC) of the Philippines. Foreign medical graduates may apply to take the licensure exam if they hold Philippine citizenship. Graduates of a medical school who are at least 21 years of age, have completed their internship, and passed the national medical board exam may apply for a physician license as a general medical practitioner according to Philippine Medical Act of 1959. Additional training to become a specialist may be obtained by completing a residency program. Sub-specialization may be obtained by completing a fellowship program.

== Medical practice ==
The Medical Act of 1959, Republic Act 2382 require physicians to be at least 21 years of age, a citizen of the Philippines, have graduated from an approved medical school, completed an internship, and passed the medical board exam to practice medicine. Citizens of a country that provide reciprocal medical practice privileges to Filipinos may also apply to take the medical licensing exam to register and practice medicine in the Philippines. Limited practice privileges are granted to foreign physicians under an exchange program or are commissioned medical officers of the US Armed Forces. The Philippine Medical Association (PMA), is the largest organization of medical doctors in the country. Other medical and health societies co-exist to pursue more specific interests in the medical field (i.e. Philippine Academy of Family Physicians, Philippine Dermatological Society, Philippine Cancer Society, Philippine Pediatric Society, Philippine Association for the Study of Overweight and Obesity, etc.).

The Department of Health, a cabinet-level department under the Office of the President of the Philippines, exercises general monitoring supervisory powers over medical practitioners and allied health personnel in the Philippines.

== Notable Filipino doctors ==
- José Rizal - the National Hero of the Philippines
- Mariano Ponce - Filipino propagandist, was managing editor of La Solidaridad
- Jose Fabella - first Health Secretary
- Juan Flavier - former Health Secretary and Senator of the Philippines
- Ramon Gustilo - Orthopedic surgeon; responsible for the commonly used Gustilo open fracture classification.
- Fe del Mundo - First Filipino woman and female medical student to enter the Harvard Medical School. A pioneer of Pediatrics in the Philippines.
- Willie Ong - cardiologist and internist with large social media following, gives free medical advice online

== See also ==
- List of medical schools in the Philippines
- Higher education in the Philippines
- Philippine College of Physicians
