= Matias H. Aznar Memorial College of Medicine =

Private medical college in Cebu City, Philippines

Matias H. Aznar Memorial College of Medicine, Inc.
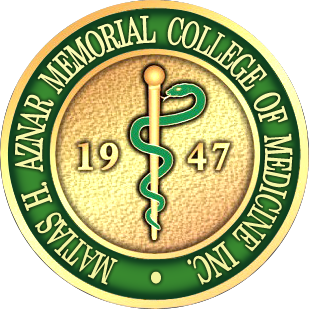
- Motto: "We are MHAM"
- Type: Private, medical school, medical research center
- Established: 1947
- Affiliations: Vicente Sotto Memorial Medical Center (VSMMC)-Base Hospital; Perpetual Succour Hospital; Visayas Community Medical Center; Chong Hua Hospital (CHH); Yanhee Hospital, Bangkok, Thailand
- President: Elma Aznar Sierra
- Vice-president: Angelica Rosario A. Sierra (VP for External Affairs); Victor A. Sierra (VP for Administration); Roy J. Entienza, MD (VP for Academics); Francisco B. Bacalla (AVP for Administration)
- Dean: Allan R. Librando, MD, MBA, FICS
- Faculty: Faculty-doctors; 44 full-time 149 part-time
- Students: 1,226
- Location: R. Duterte St., Sitio Banawa, Brgy. Guadalupe, Cebu City, Philippines; 10°18′48″N 123°52′51″E
- Campus: Urban
- Language: English
- Colors: Green, gold, white
- Nickname: Dragons
- Website: mhamcollege.edu.ph
- Location in the Visayas Location in the Philippines

Matias H. Aznar Memorial College of Medicine, Inc. (MHAM CM, Inc.) is a medical school in Cebu City, Philippines. It was founded in 1947.

== History ==
Matias H. Aznar Memorial College of Medicine, Inc. (MHAM CM, Inc.) is an educational, non-stock institution established by Don Matias Hipolito Aznar II and his wife Doña Anunciacion Barcenilla Aznar. In the school year 1946–1947, the Doctor of Medicine Program was opened, with full government recognition granted by the Department of Education in 1952 and the enactment of the Medical Act of 1965 by the Philippine Congress requiring all medical colleges in the country to be converted into a non-profit and non-stock educational institution. Thus, the Doctor of Medicine Program was converted and registered with the Securities and Exchange Commission on May 26, 1970, under the corporate name Matias H. Aznar Memorial College of Medicine, Inc., and was given an institutional identifier number 7071 by the Commission on Higher Education. The school was named after its late founder, Matias Hipolito Aznar II, known to the general public as MHAM, to honor and perpetuate his memory.

The Doctor of Medicine is the only academic program offered by the school which operates separately from SWU PHINMA.

== Campus ==
MHAM is located in R. Duterte St., Sitio Banawa, Brgy. Guadalupe, Cebu City. The campus consists of a 10-storey main building, and a 6-storey annex building. Before locating in its current location, MHAM was temporarily located at Redemptorist Plaza, Brgy. Camputhaw, Cebu City.

== Student organizations ==
- MHAM Student Council
- Asklepian Circle
- Caduceus Rescue Unit (CRU)
- MHArMony
- MHAM Upbeat
- MHAM Acoustics
- The Saline Option-MHAM CM
- Student Advocates for Public Health and Environment (SAPHE)

== Publications ==
- The Pulse - The official publication of Matias H. Aznar Memorial College of Medicine, Inc.
- MHAM College of Medicine Medical Research Journal

== Affiliated hospitals ==
- Vicente Sotto Memorial Medical Center (VSMMC) - Base Hospital
- Perpetual Succour Hospital - Bishop Juan Bautista G. Gorordo Avenue, Cebu City
- Visayas Community Medical Center
- Chong Hua Hospital (CHH)
- Yanhee Hospital, Bangkok, Thailand
