= Velez College =

Private college in Cebu City, Philippines

- Former name: Cebu (Velez) General Hospital School of Nursing (1952-1966)
- Motto: Scientia et Veritas per Educationem (Latin)
- Motto in English: Knowledge and Truth through education
- Type: Private Coeducational Higher education institution
- Established: 1952
- Founder: Dr. Jacinto Velez Sr.
- Academic affiliations: PAASCU FAAP PACU
- Chairperson: Carmen M. Velez, M.D.
- President: Carmen M. Velez, M.D.
- Vice-president: Ma. Nona A. Velez, MN, RN (VP – Academic Affairs); Ma. Nona A. Velez, MN, RN (VP – Finance); James Louis V. Ting ( VP – Administrative Affairs)
- Dean: List: Pamiela M. Demecillo, RMT, MPH, DM (College of Medical Technology); Norly R. Plasencia, DALC (College of Arts & Sciences); Ma. Carol R. Kangleon, DScN, MN, RN, (College of Nursing); Romel V. Cabazor, PTRP, MA (College of Physical Therapy and Occupational Therapy)
- Director: List: Johnny J. Yao Jr., DScN, DM, MN, RN (Research Director); Anne Caroline M. Castillo, DM, MN, RN (Quality Assurance Director); Bellavic A. Tropezado, MAN, RN (Student Services and Affairs Director); Christine C. Ruedas, MM (Community Extension Services Director)
- Registrar: Ariel F. Valle, MPA, JD
- Location: 41 F. Ramos St., Cebu City, Cebu, Philippines; 10°18′29″N 123°53′50″E
- Head Librarian: Josefina P. Miñoza, MLIS, RL
- Colors: Green
- Website: www.velezcollege.com

Velez College is a private educational institution in Cebu City, Cebu, widely known for offering allied health degrees. It was founded by Dr. Jacinto Velez Sr. in 1952, who was then chairman of the board of trustees of Cebu (Velez) General Hospital School of Nursing. It was incorporated under the Philippine Corporation Law on March 28, 1966. The institution has four component colleges: College of Arts and Sciences, College of Medical Technology, College of Nursing, and College of Physical Therapy and Occupational Therapy.

== History ==
The college started out as the Cebu (Velez) General Hospital School of Nursing in the school year 1952-1953, founded by the late Epifania Mendoza Velez, with the support of her husband, the late Dr. Jacinto Velez Sr. as well as the staff of the hospital. The school offered a three-year Nursing academic program that had 26 pioneer graduates on April 2, 1955.

In the school year 1967-1968, the school replaced the curriculum with a five-year Baccalaureate program. In 1976, the institution responded to the government's desire to reconstruct the existing five-year curriculum to a four-year Baccalaureate program.

The College of Liberal Arts then opened in 1966, followed by the other colleges: the College of Medical Technology in 1967, and the College of Nursing in 1968.

The college started offering five-year courses in Occupational Therapy and Physical Therapy in the school year 1992-1993.

In the school year 1998-1999, the Colleges of Nursing, Medical Technology, Occupational and Physical Therapy and other health-related programs implemented the Commission on Higher Education's Memorandum Order No. 27, Series of 1998, leading to an undergraduate program that prepares students for entry into any of the health courses — Medicine, Radiologic Technology, Midwifery, Medical Technology, Nursing, Occupational & Physical Therapy, Nutrition & Dietetics, Pharmacy, Dentistry and Optometry.

In 2006, CHED issued another memorandum to amend the Health Science Education Curriculum.

The Nursing program underwent changes. On April 16, 2008 the Technical Committee for Nursing Education (TCNE) of the Commission on Higher Education (CHED) held a regional orientation about “Policies and Standards for the Bachelor of Science in Nursing Program”. This led to a new curriculum in the school year 2008-2009. Later it was revised and, in the following school year, another new curriculum was introduced.

With increasing enrollment and to cope with present demands, Velez College continually updates its curricula on the degree programs being offered. A new Arts and Sciences Building was constructed at the back of Raintree Mall to accommodate more students and to provide better facilities.

== Academics ==
Velez College offers the following four-year Baccalaureate degrees:

- Bachelor of Science in Biology
- Bachelor of Science in Nursing
- Bachelor of Science in Medical Technology
- Bachelor of Science in Occupational Therapy
- Bachelor of Science in Physical Therapy

Cebu Institute of Medicine (Medical School)

- Doctor of Medicine

=== Accreditations ===
The degree programs of Velez College are accredited by the Philippine Accrediting Association of Schools, Colleges and Universities (PAASCU): Level III for the Nursing program; Level I for the Arts & Sciences, Medical Technology, and Physical Therapy programs; and Candidate Status for the Occupational Therapy program.

The Velez College Ethics Review Committee is a Level II Research Ethics Committee accredited by the Philippine Health Research Ethics Board (PHREB).

== Traditions ==
- College seal
- School hymn: The Velezian March

== See also ==
- Cebu Institute of Medicine
