= Cebu Institute of Medicine =

Private medical school in Cebu City, Philippines

Cebu Institute of Medicine Velez College
- Former name: Cebu Institute of Technology — College of Medicine (1957-1966)
- Motto: Physicians with a Heart
- Type: Private, Co-educational, Nonsectarian
- Established: June 1957; 69 years ago (CIM as Cebu Institute of Technology — College of Medicine); March 28, 1966; 60 years ago (Velez College)
- Founders: Jacinto M. Velez, Sr. (founder of Velez College and first Dean of CIM)
- Affiliations: Cebu Velez General Hospital (CVGH); Vicente Sotto Memorial Medical Center (VSMMC); Chong Hua Hospital (CHH)
- President: Carmen M. Velez, M.D. (Velez College and CIM; concurrently Chairperson of CIM)
- Dean: Thelma L. Fernandez, M.D., M.PH, FPAP CIM Dean; Cecilia P. Lepon-Capatoy, MD College of Medical Technology (Velez College); Leticia T. Llacuna College of Arts and Sciences (Velez College); Ma. Carol R. Kangleon, RN, MN, DScN College of Nursing (Velez College); Romel V. Cabazor, PTRP, MA College of Physical Therapy and Occupational Therapy (Velez College)
- Location: F. Ramos St., Cebu City, Cebu, Philippines; 10°18′28″N 123°53′48″E
- Hymn: "The CIM Hymn" "The Velezian March"
- Colors: Blue and White (CIM); Green (Velez College)
- Website: www.cim.edu.ph; www.velezcollege.com
- Location in the Visayas Location in the Philippines

Cebu Institute of Medicine (CIM) is a private medical school located in Cebu City, Philippines. The medical school is affiliated with, but autonomous from, Velez College.

Both are located adjacent to each other in F. Ramos Street. Its primary base hospital is the Cebu Velez General Hospital, which is also located in the F. Ramos Street.

== History ==
The Cebu Institute of Medicine (CIM) is a non-stock, non-profit institution established in June 1957 as the Cebu Institute of Technology, College of Medicine (CIT–College of Medicine). Its pioneering class of 33 students graduated in 1962 under the then five-year curriculum.

In 1966, the CIT–College of Medicine became affiliated with Velez College and served as its medical school under the name Cebu Institute of Medicine (CIM). Dr. Jacinto Velez Sr. became its first dean.

Velez College was founded by Epifania Mendoza Velez with the support of Dr. Jacinto Velez Sr., who had served as chairman of the board of trustees of its predecessor, the Cebu (Velez) General Hospital School of Nursing, during the 1952–1953 school year. Velez College was incorporated on March 28, 1966. Its College of Liberal Arts was opened in 1966–1967, followed by the College of Medical Technology in 1967–1968 and the College of Nursing in 1968–1969, with the latter's first batch of graduates completing their studies in March 1973. The College of Physical Therapy and Occupational Therapy was established in 1992–1993.

CIM's pioneering class consisted of 33 students in 1962. By 2008, the institution had produced 4,778 graduates, including 36 graduates with honors and 123 board topnotchers.

In February 1987, CIM was classified as a Level IV institution by the Board on Medical Education, the highest category for medical institutions.

In April 1996, the Commission on Higher Education identified CIM as one of three Centers of Excellence in Medicine. In September 2001, the Commission on Higher Education granted CIM autonomous status. The institution is also accredited by PAASCU.

== Research and academics ==
In the 1970s fundamentals of research were introduced to the students of the Cebu Institute of Medicine by the Chairman of the Department of Preventive and Social Medicine, Dr. Florentino Solon with Dr. Tomas Fernandez and Dr. Virginia Mesola.

Some of the important researches were done in coordination with:

Cornell University, Virginia Polytechnic Institute and State University, Pennsylvania State University, University of North Carolina, Washington University School of Medicine, UP Institute of Public Health, UP – PGH Research Institute of Tropical Medicine and University of San Carlos.

Thereafter, research became institutionalized in the Department of Biochemistry, Microbiology, Physiology and Pharmacology and Family & Community Medicine.

The Clinical Epidemiology Unit (CEU) currently composed of Dr. Paterno Veloso Jr., Fidelis E.Quiza, Cheryl K.Bullo and Stephen Bullo; an affiliate of the Southeast Asian Epidemiology Net was established with the primary mission to improve the research capability of the Faculty, Students and Residents in training.

1. Conducts different Research Methodology Workshops for various specialty societies, hospital residents, and students of medical schools in Visayas and Mindanao.
2. Provides consultative services to students, residents, consultants and faculty members undertaking research studies.

As one of the five acclaimed Center of Medical Excellence, CIM was tasked to provide a series of lecture-workshops with mentoring on Research Methodology to a core staff of faculty members of the College of Medicine of the West Visayas State University. Just recently, the five-year Twinning Program on Research Capability Development co-sponsored by the Philippine Council for Health Research and Development and the Association of Philippine Medical Colleges was successfully concluded.

It had been tasked by the Philippine Council for Health Research and Development to be a zonal convenor for the formulation of the Health S & T Priorities 1999–2004 and by the Philippine National Health Research System for the formulation of the National Unified Health Research Agenda 2006–2012 for Zone 3 which covers Regions 6,7 and 8.

On the other hand, Velez College currently has 4 colleges namely the College of Nursing, College of Medical Technology, College of Physical Therapy and Occupational Therapy, and the College of Arts & Sciences.

== Awards ==
On February 16, 1987, CIM was classified by the Board on Medical Education as Level IV, the highest category for medical institution.

In April 1996, the Commission on Higher Education has identified CIM as one of the three Center of Excellence for Medicine. It earned the distinction of being the only Center of Excellence for the entire Visayas and Mindanao.

The Commission on Higher Education has granted CIM an autonomous status in September 2001.

The school has likewise received recognition from the Center for Higher Education (CHED) and the Philippine Accreditation of Schools, Colleges and Universities (PAASCU), the first medical school in the Visayas and Mindanao to be granted such accreditation.

== Problem-based learning methodology ==
In academic year 2001–2002, the institution initially implemented the competency-based PBL approach curriculum in the first year class and became fully PBL in all three-year levels by school year 2003–2004.

The first batch of the full PBL students graduated in April 2005 and took the board examinations that same year.

From the first PBL class, during the August 2006 exam, 98% passed with two students topping the board examinations.

== Student performance ==
From its 33 graduates in 1962, CIM has produced about 4,750 graduates as of 2009, 35 of whom graduated with honors.

In 2006, the passing percentage for the board exam of the first graduates of PBL was 98%. Thereafter, the school boasts of a track record in the Philippine medical licensure examinations with an impeccable 100% passing percentage in the last six successive board examinations.
