= De La Salle Medical and Health Sciences Institute =

Private medical institution in Cavite, Philippines

- Former names: De La Salle University-Health Sciences Campus (1995–2007); De La Salle Health Sciences Institute (2007–2017)
- Motto: Nurturing Lives
- Type: Private, research, non-stock, coeducational higher education institution
- Established: 1979; 47 years ago
- Religious affiliation: Christian Brothers (Catholic)
- Academic affiliations: DLSP, AUN-QA, UMAP, SEAMEO
- President: Dr. Antonio B. Ramos MD, FPCS, FPATACSI, MBA
- Faculty: 350
- Students: 4,500
- Location: Dasmariñas, Cavite, Philippines; 14°19′37.5″N 120°56′39.3″E
- Campus: Urban, 15 hectares (150,000 m^{2})
- School hymn: Hail to De La Salle
- Patron Saint: St. Jean-Baptiste de La Salle
- Colors: Green & White
- Nickname: Green Sentinels
- Sporting affiliations: PRISAA, SLCUAA, Palarong Medisina
- Website: www.dlsmhsi.edu.ph

- Location in Luzon Location in the Philippines

The De La Salle Medical and Health Sciences Institute (DLSMHSI) is a medical school and allied health institution in Dasmariñas, Cavite, Philippines. It was established in 1979 and is a constituent of De La Salle Philippines. The institute consists of three service divisions: the academic division, consisting of the colleges and a senior high school, which offer only medicine and allied health programs, its teaching hospital, De La Salle University Medical Center, and a research facility, Angelo King Medical Research Center. It is situated near the De La Salle University-Dasmariñas, a separate De La Salle campus.

== History ==
The De La Salle Medical and Health Sciences Institute was started by a group of doctors from the College of Medicine of the University of the Philippines and the Philippine General Hospital who, in 1976, decided to establish a medical school to support the need for a well-trained staff for the newly inaugurated Medical Center Manila. Following the national government's policy of dispersing educational facilities outside the capital city and encouraging the establishment of medical schools in various regions of the country, they decided to establish a medical school in Dasmariñas, Cavite. Originally named Emilio Aguinaldo College of Medicine, the school opened in 1979 under the management of the University Physicians' Foundation, Inc. with the Jose P. Rizal National Medical Research Center as its initial teaching hospital. Then on July 31, 1982, the Foundation inaugurated a 4-story 180-bed teaching hospital, the University Medical Center.

In June 1987, ownership and management were acquired by De La Salle University Inc. In 1992, the college was renamed the De La Salle University College of Medicine, and the hospital, the De La Salle University Medical Center. In June 1994, the management of the college of Physical Therapy which was then part of DLSU-Aguinaldo (now DLSU-D) was turned over to the De La Salle University College of Medicine. By June 1995, the complex consisting of the College of Medicine, University Medical Center, College of Physical Therapy, and Research Services was named De La Salle University – Health Sciences Campus or DLSU-HSC under the ownership and administration of the Saint Br. Miguel Febres Cordero Medical Education Foundation.

In May 2000, the colleges under the administration of the DLSU-Health Sciences Campus increased with the transfer of the Colleges of Medical Radiation Technology and Nursing & Midwifery (formerly under DLSU-D). Eventually, the institution’s name became De La Salle Health Sciences Institute upon approval of the board of trustees in September 2007.

In October 2019, DLSMHSI became an official member of the ASEAN University Network-Quality Assurance (AUN-QA) as confirmed by Banjong Ujjin, the Senior Programme Officer of the AUN Secretariat Team. During this month, institute also broke ground on its new grandstand to be located in its newly acquired Annexed Property. On October 25, the Commission on Higher Education (CHED), granted autonomous status to DLSMHSI through the CHED Memorandum Order No. 12, series of 2019. This means that the institution can enjoy a lot of benefits including being allowed to launch new courses/programs in the undergraduate and/or graduate levels including doctoral programs in areas of expertise without securing a permit/authority from CHED; only informing them of the programs to be offered.

== Academics ==
=== Programs and Accreditations ===
DLSMHSI offers academic programs through its nine colleges and a special health sciences senior high school. Currently, four of its programs are accredited by PAASCU, a service organization that accredits academic programs which meet commonly accepted standards of quality education.

=== Admission ===
DLSMHSI accepts walk-in, online, and foreign applicants for the senior high school, undergraduate, and medicine programs. Medicine program applicants, however, should have taken the National Medical Admission Test (NMAT) and have a ranking score of 90th percentile or higher. An acceptance letter or acknowledgment letter from the Lasallian Admission & Scholarship Opportunities (LASO) office will be received should the applicant pass all the criteria for screening and evaluation.

The institution also offers scholarship opportunities to 25% of its student population. Currently, DLSMHSI has at least 10 institutional scholarship programs while also accepting externally funded scholarships.

=== Campus ===
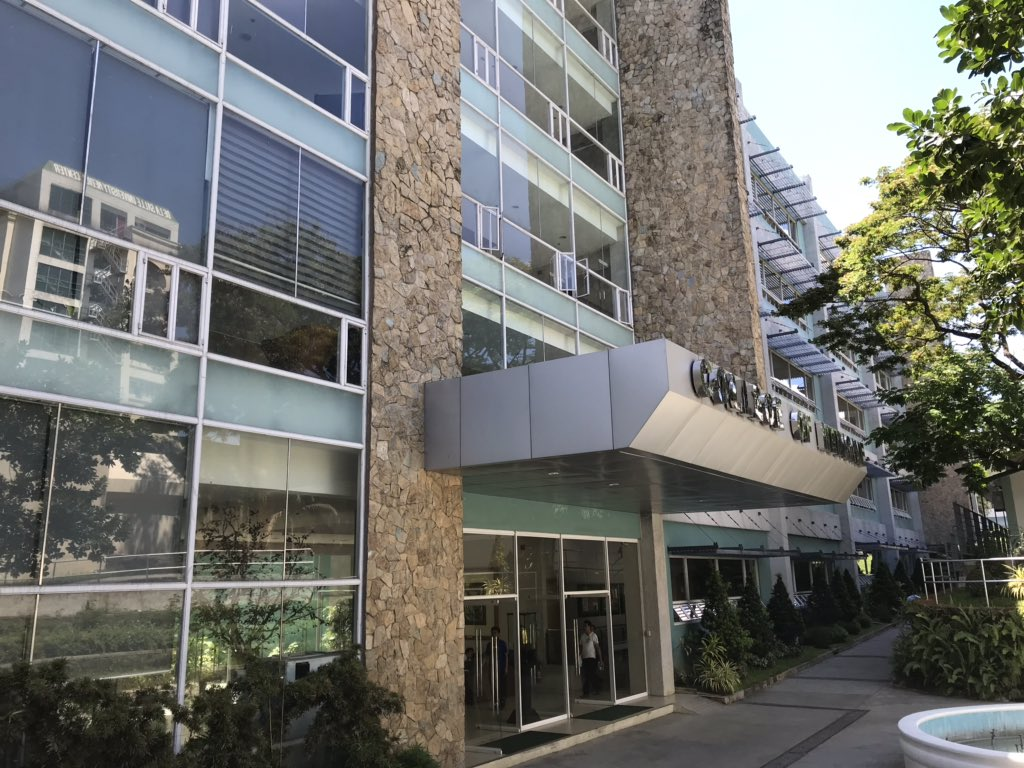
DLSMHSI College of Medicine Building

- College of Medicine Building - It houses the facilities of the College of Medicine. The building includes classrooms, auditoriums, a chapel, a gross anatomy laboratory, a dry laboratory, a biochemistry laboratory, a clinical skills simulation laboratory, and a health informatics laboratory.
- Lourdes E. Campos, M.D. Building - The facilities of the College of Medical Laboratory Science and the College of Humanities and Sciences are in this building. The building includes classrooms, the Physics laboratory, the Chemistry laboratory, and the Biology laboratory. This is also where the admissions office and guidance counselor’s office can be found.
- Academic Center for Health Sciences (Wang Building) - It houses the facilities of the College of Medical Imaging and Therapy, the College of Nursing, and the College of Rehabilitation Sciences. Most administrative offices of DLSMHSI are also here.

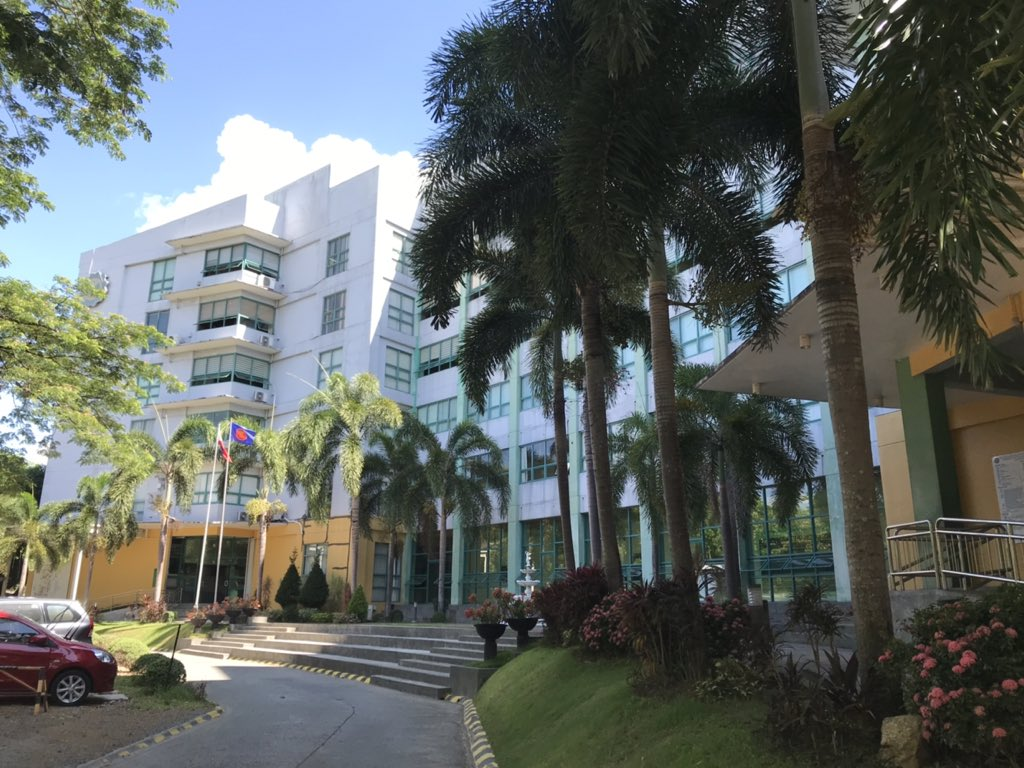
DLSMHSI Wang Building

- Dr. Mariano Que College of Pharmacy Building - It is the newest building in the institution that houses the facilities of the College of Pharmacy. It was inaugurated on September 20, 2016, together with its industry partner, Mercury Drug Corporation.
- Romeo P. Ariniego, M.D., AFSC Library - It is a modern, air-conditioned, six-story building that houses the extensive print and online book collections and resources of the library as well as the art collections of Dr. Ariniego, a former dean and faculty member of the College of Medicine. The library also features medicine and allied health sections, discussion rooms, lockers, and a learning commons. On December 17, 2019, it was chosen as the first-ever recipient of the Innovative Library Design Award by the Philippine Association of Academic and Research Librarians, Inc. (PAARL). The award “gives recognition to a library that showcases excellence in library design and demonstrates the impact of such innovative library design on learning, teaching, and research”. The official awarding ceremony was held on January 31, 2020, during PAARL’s 47th General Assembly .
- De La Salle Animo Center - It serves as the venue for sports, culture, and other social, civic, and cultural endeavors of the DLSMHSI community. Physical Education classes are also held here. It is an enclosed and air-conditioned gymnasium that features a basketball court, volleyball court, badminton court, fitness center, stage, bleachers, and shower rooms.

=== International Partners ===
DLSMHSI currently has 18 international linkages for student exchange, research, and other activities. They are as follows: IIRMA Education Consultancy Pvt. Ltd. (India), JUNSEI Education Institution (Japan), Seton Hall University (USA), Universidad La Salle Victoria (Mexico), Widya Mandala Catholic University (Indonesia), Universitas Kristen Krida Wacana (Indonesia), Tzu Chi University (Taiwan), Saint Mary's University of Minnesota (USA), ANHUI YIBU Education and Technology Co., Ltd (China), Ratchasuda College Mahidol University (Thailand), Ecole Supérieur Panafricain De Management Applique - ESPAM Formation University (Benin), Dongseo University (South Korea), Australian Catholic University (Australia), Saint Mary’s College of California (USA), Oceania University of Medicine (Samoa), La Salle Campus Madrid (Spain), Safety Trust Administration Academy (South Korea), Miyakonojo Higashi High School (Japan).

== De La Salle University Medical Center ==
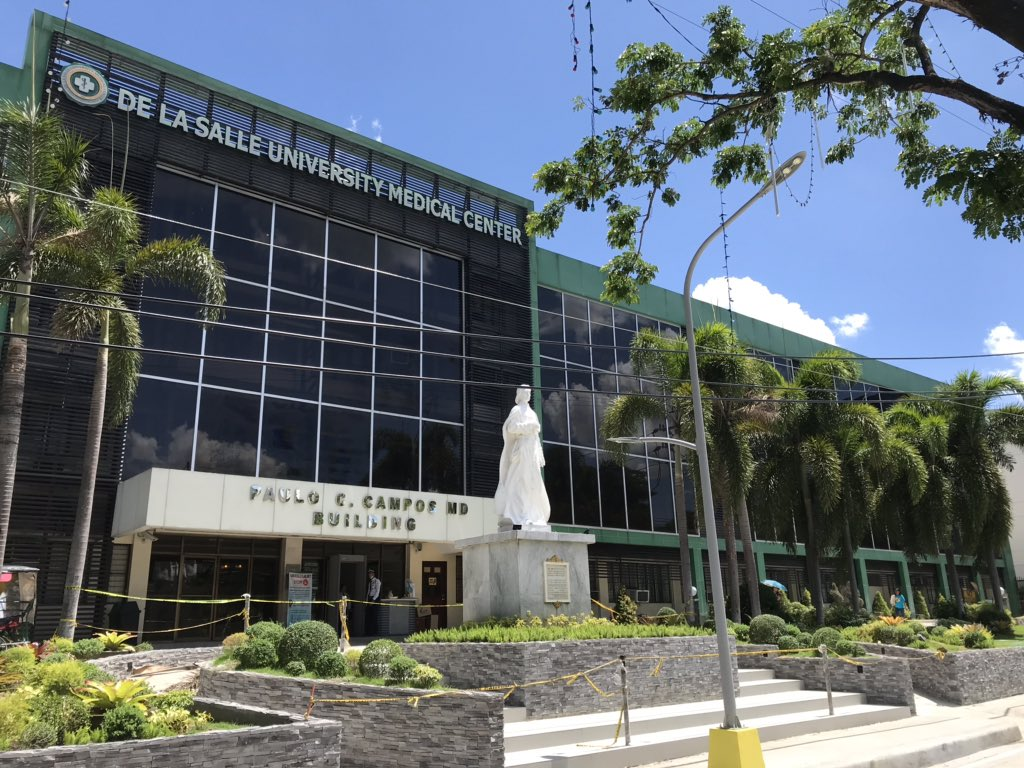
De La Salle University Medical Center's new facade

The De La Salle University Medical Center ('DLSUMC; also known as UMC) acts as the teaching hospital of DLSMHSI. Owned by the De La Salle Brothers Philippines and administered by the Sisters of St. Paul de Chartres, it offers a tertiary level of medical care. The offices of the clinical departments and the full-time clinical faculty members are in this hospital. Since 1995, the expansion program has increased the hospital's bed capacity to a total of 300 beds. The De La Salle University Medical Center includes many state-of-the-art medical equipment. The hospital also leads other private hospitals in Cavite in setting up medical wards intended for the poor enrolled in the Cavite Governor's health reform program, Dignidad at Kalidad (DK).

In 1990, a 4-story annex, the Raul Wu Chiu Kuan Building was added. Modern equipment continued to be acquired to make DLSUMC comparable with any of the large hospitals in Metro Manila. A Pulmonary Unit, Hemodialysis Unit, 12-bed Intensive Care Unit, Cardiovascular Laboratory, CT Scan, Echo-Doppler, and Ultrasonography are just some of the services offered by the medical center.

August 28, 1997, marked the inauguration of the 10-story hospital annex building, the De La Salle University-Doña Teodorica Favis Vda. De Rivera Hall.

In October 1999, the De La Salle University Medical Center became the first hospital in the Philippines to receive an ISO 9001 Certification and in July 2003 it received a Certification by the TUV–Rheinland and Berlin– Brandenburg Group of Companies.

== Angelo King Medical Research Center ==
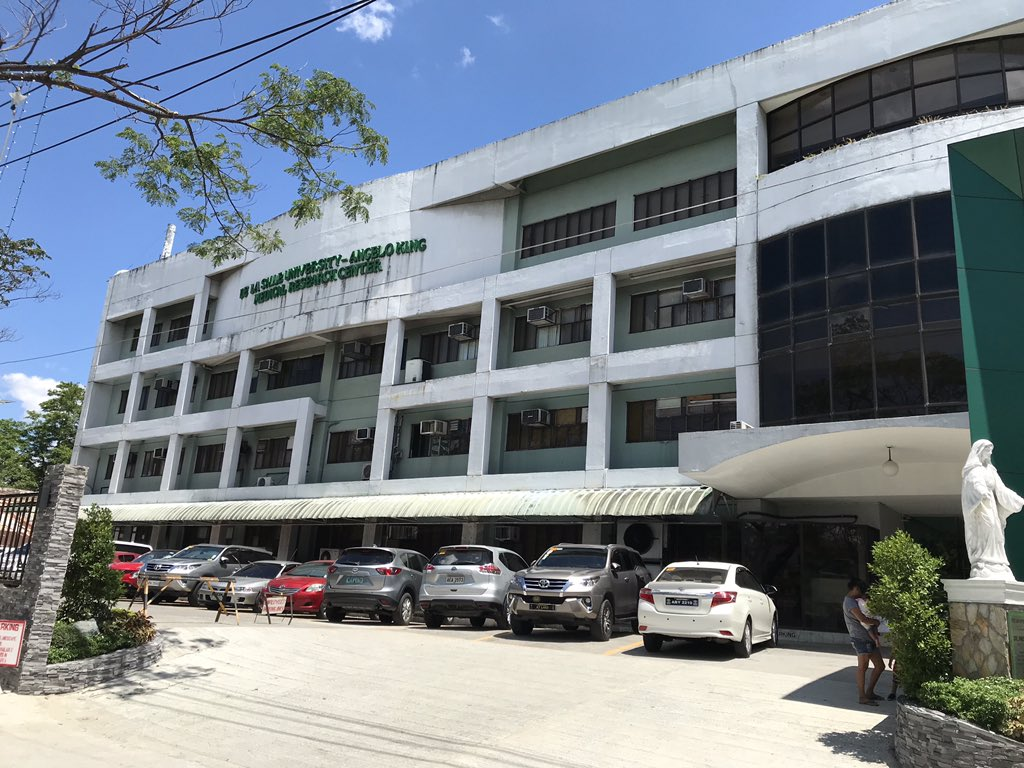
Angelo King Medical Research Center facade

The De La Salle Medical and Health Sciences Institute-Angelo King Medical Research Center ('DLSMHSI-AKMRC) was established on April 7, 1994, to house, in one facility, all research activities of DLSMHSI. It has a Level 3 accreditation from the Philippine Health Research Ethics Board (PHREB), the highest accreditation level that they grant to Research Ethics Committees in research institutions, which enables it to conduct studies for Food and Drug Administration (FDA).

Research within the institution has been further spurred on by the membership in national and international networks such as the International Clinical Epidemiology Network (INCLEN) as well as its regional (Southeast Asian Clinical Epidemiology Network) and local affiliates (Philippine Clinical Epidemiology Network). Other networks include the International Network for the Rational Use of Drugs (INRUD) and the Adverse Drug Reaction Network. The institution is also an active member of non-governmental organizations & academic groups such as the Philippine Coalition Against Tuberculosis (PHILCAT) and the National TB Study Group.

In terms of research education, the research center, through the De La Salle Clinical Epidemiology Unit, is the main training center for the Southern Luzon region; hosting annual research workshops and seminars, and providing facilities for the promotion of research. Annually, the research center is responsible for the production of hundreds of research from the faculty, consultants, medical residents and students of the institution.

== Notable alumni ==
- Willie Ong - Former senatorial candidate, Doctor of Medicine
- Maria Rosario Vergeire - Former undersecretary of Department of Health, Doctor of Medicine
- Angeli Gonzales - Actress, Doctor of Medicine
- Honey Lacuna - Former city mayor of Manila, Doctor of Medicine
