= National Medical Admission Test (Philippines) =

Filipino medical school entrance examination

The National Medical Admission Test (NMAT) is a nationwide examination required for the entrance to any medical school in the Philippines.

It is sometimes considered as equivalent to the MCAT, which is held in the United States. The test consists of Part I and Part II. Part I is a 200-item test with four subdivisions, which are on Verbal, Inductive Reasoning, Quantitative and Perceptual Acuity Skills and is a three-hour exam. Part II is a two-hour-30-minute test in the field of basic sciences such as Biology, Physics, Social Sciences and Chemistry, all of which form 200 items. Qualified test takers are graduates and graduating students of degree programs. So that is 5 hours and 30 minutes exam in a day. Generally its results come in about 15 working days, and a candidate can get the admission as per college requirements. The grading system is percentile ranking from 1- to 99+ and marks are given ranging from 200 to 800.

== See also ==
- List of medical schools in the Philippines
- Medical education in the Philippines
