= University of Santo Tomas Faculty of Medicine and Surgery =

Medical school of the University of Santo Tomas

- Former names: 1871 – Facultad de Medicina y Farmacia (Faculty of Medicine and Pharmacy)
- Type: Private Research University
- Established: May 28, 1871
- Dean: Ma. Lourdes Domingo-Maglinao
- Regent: Maximo Gatela
- Students: 2,072 (as of 2016)
- Location: St. Martin de Porres Building, UST, Sampaloc, Manila, Philippines
- Patron saint: Saints Cosmas and Damian
- Colors: Yellow
- Website: medicine.ust.edu.ph

The University of Santo Tomas Faculty of Medicine and Surgery (USTFMS) is the medical school of the University of Santo Tomas, the oldest and largest Catholic university in Manila, Philippines.

Established in 1871, the faculty is the first medical school in the Philippines. It is proclaimed to be a Center of Excellence by the Commission on Higher Education.

In 2018, LEAPMed, a special preparatory course for the UST medicine program was offered to a limited number of highly exceptional high school graduates ranking among the Top 200 of the University entrance exams, taught completely under the supervision of the Faculty of Medicine and Surgery

== History ==
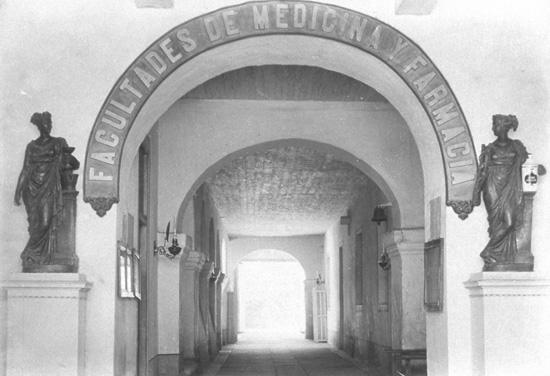
The Faculty of Medicine and Pharmacy at the Colegio de San Jose.

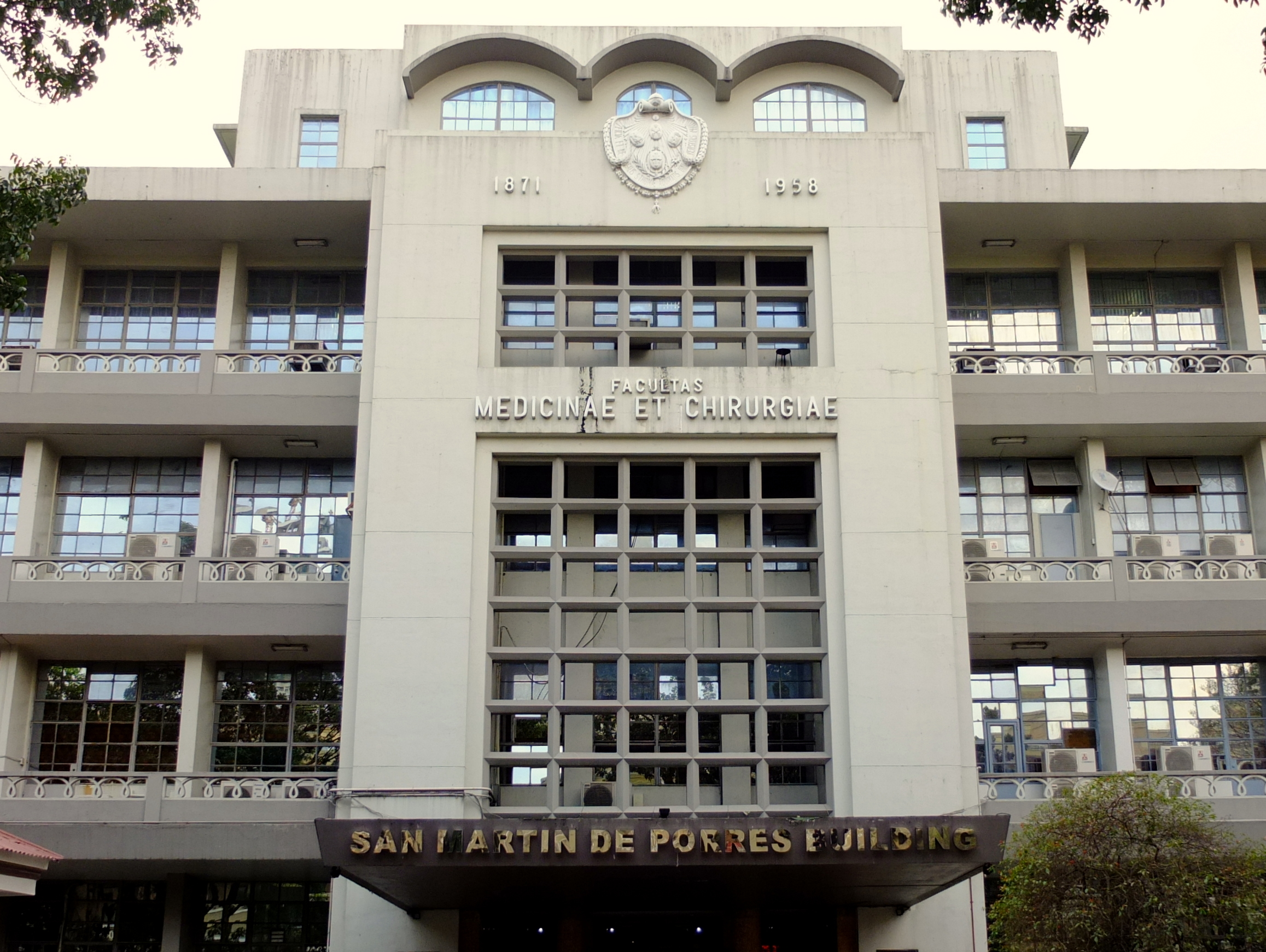
St. Martin de Porres Building

Petition for the establishment of colleges dedicated to medicine and pharmacy started in 1682, Sixty-one years after the foundation of the university. In November 22 of the same year, the Spanish granted the petition but nothing came of it due to financial and technical difficulties. By 1785, the Dominican Friars put it on the priority list and despite the enthusiasm of Governor General Mariano Folgueras, the planned colleges failed to materialize until the late 19th century.

The faculty was founded in 1871 as the Facultad de Medicina y Farmacia by virtue of the modified Moret Decree of 1870 which supplants the Philippine educational reforms of 1865 by the Spanish Government. The original Moret Decree calls for the secularization of the university to be renamed as "Universidad de Filipinas," Upon the protests of religious groups, parents and the Archdiocese of Manila, the decree was modified to remove the inimical provisions. The modified decree was approved and promulgated on October 29, 1875, by the Governor General of the Islands, Don Rafael Izquierdo.

The faculty was eventually associated with Colegio de San Jose as both were suffering from lack of financial support. Both institutions were saved by Dr. Esteban Rodriguez de Figueroa's last will and testament which stated that his wealth be given to the Society of Jesus. The haciendas of Colegio de San Jose were turned over to the University of Santo Tomas as ordered by Governor General Domingo Moriones y Muralla in 1879. These were returned to the Society of Jesus in 1910 which was to fund a seminary now known as the San Jose Seminary.

From 1871 until 1927, the Faculty of Medicine and Surgery conducted its classes in the Intramuros campus of the University of Santo Tomas. It was also associated with the San Juan de Dios Hospital which functioned as the faculty's clinical arm as decreed by King Alfonso of Spain on October 29, 1875. This setup continued until 1941 when the Japanese took over Quezon Institute and transferring all of its medical staff and patients to San Juan de Dios Hospital. Clinical training during this time was in partnership with Saint Paul Hospital in Intramuros until the walled city's destruction during the Liberation of Manila.

After the war, the entire school moved to the present campus, occupying the four-story building it now resides in. Today, the Medicine Building, later renamed the St. Martin de Porres Building, features eleven lecture halls, seven laboratories, a dissection hall, an Ossarium, the Medicine Museum, and the Anatomy and Pathology galleries. It also includes a large 1,200-seat auditorium, a 350-seat Continuing Medical Education auditorium, a medical library, a learning resources unit, a building for the Research Center for the Health Sciences, and numerous shared classrooms with the UST College of Nursing and the UST College of Rehabilitation Sciences.

With the reopening of the faculty in Sampaloc campus, it experienced substantial growth. In 1932, the faculty began to accept female students and by 1937, about 30 women physicians graduated.

The faculty consistently ranks among the top performing medical schools in the country.

=== Historical Timeline ===
Year	Historical Notes
1682	The Spanish government granted the petition of the University to establish a College of Medicine and Pharmacy but financial and technical difficulties were plentiful.
1871	The local government ordered the establishment of the Facultad de Medicina y Farmacia during the term of Rector Magnificus Domingo Treserra, O.P., Dr. Rafael Ginard was the first dean. The school offered a 6-year course (1 preparatory instruction, 5 years medicine proper) leading to a Licentiate in Medicine.
1875	The medical school started affiliation with the San Juan de Dios Hospital for clinical training, by decree of King Alfonso of Spain.
1876	The first commencement exercises were held on 10 March 1877, three Spaniards and four Filipinos graduated.
1878 - 1882	Jose Rizal, present-day national hero of the Philippines, was granted by the University the rare privilege of studying simultaneously the Curso de Ampliación (Preparatory Course of Medicine) and the First Year of Medicine. On his last year, among seven students, Rizal ranked second in class.
1902	After the Philippine-American War, the university adapts to the American System, and the licentiate in Medicine becomes the Doctor of Medicine degree.
1927	On completion of the Main Building in the new campus on España, first and second year medical classes were transferred from Intramuros.
1932	In compliance with orders of the Congregation of Studies of the Holy See, the first women students were admitted. This class of 30 graduated in 1937.
1941	The Santo Tomas Journal of Medicine, also known as the UST Journal of Medicine publishes its first volume, under the leadership of its first Editor-in-Chief, Dean Bonifacio Mencias.
1942	In the Japanese Occupation of the Philippines, the Imperial Japanese Army occupied San Juan de Dios Hospital. Clinical instruction was transferred to St. Paul's Hospital.
1945	After the Battle of Manila, the Faculty of Medicine and Surgery moved its operations to the España campus
1946	The Charity Division of the University Hospital opened at the old UST High School Building and on March 7, the Pay Division was established at its present site, formerly the Education Building.
1947	The Santo Tomas Journal of Medicine resumes publication after 6 years of inactivity.
1948	Classes of the medical school were scattered at the old High School Building, the Main Building and a quonset hut beside the printing press.
1951	Construction of the rear, east and west wings of the San Martin de Porres building (then "Medicine Building") was started. Architect Julio Victor Rocha designed the building. It was inaugurated on September 27, 1952.
1958	The front and center wings of the San Martin de Porres (then "Medicine Building") building was completed.
1965	The University Hospital’s Clinical Division on Forbes St. was constructed during the rectorship of Fr. Jesus Diaz, O.P. It was blessed and inaugurated by Rufino J. Cardinal Santos of Manila.
1970	Pope Paul VI, in his sojourn to the country, addressed the Asian Bishop’s Conference that convened at the Medicine Auditorium.
1979	The Medicine Building which also houses the College of Nursing and Institute of Physical Therapy was renamed St. Martin de Porres Building on February 8.
1982	Establishment of Dr. Hubert Wong Learning Resources Unit on September 24, 1982
1984	Establishment of Health Science Research Management Group in August 1984. Improved the organizational structure by establishing the Department of Medical Education.
1992	The Continuing Medical Education (CME) Auditorium was constructed and inaugurated.
1993	The construction and inauguration of the Experimental Surgery Building and installation of the Electron Microscopy Unit and establishment of Molecular Biology Unit.
1995	The International Youth Forum was held at the Continuing Medical Education Auditorium of the Faculty of Medicine and Surgery on January 5–10.
1998	The Faculty of Medicine and Surgery hosted the 9th Biennial Meeting of the International Association of Catholic Medical Schools held at the Continuing Medical Education Auditorium on February 4–7.
1999	The Integrated Curriculum was introduced. These involved the integration and synchronization of topics taken in various courses in the first, second and third year levels (horizontal integration). The graduate-level degree, Master of Science in Clinical Audiology was introduced.
2001	Implementation of the Innovative Curriculum using the Problem Based Learning (PBL) approach for two (2) consecutive years (2001-2003). Expansion of Medical Informatics Center (formerly LRU) and establishment of the Health Science Research Management Group (HSRMG).
2003	Traditional (subject based) curriculum re-implemented with more integration of subjects in all year levels. HSRMG become the Research Center for Health Sciences (RCHS).
2008	The Master's program for Pain Management was introduced.
2012	The Department of Medical Education completes the integration of ultrasound in both the basic and clinical subjects, the first Ultrasound-integrated medical curriculum in the Philippines.
2013	Completion of the four-storey Skills and Simulan Center for the Health Sciences (SSCHS), housing the Surgical Skills Facility (SSF), Life Support Science Laboratory, Ultrasound Laboratory, and the Clinical Skills Facility (CSF).
2017	After the last publication of the Santo Tomas Journal of Medicine in 2005, the Journal of Medicine UST (JMUST), the present-day journal of the Faculty of Medicine and Surgery published its first volume of research work.
2018	The 6-year accelerated program for medicine, the Learning Enhanced Accelerated Program for Medicine conferring the Bachelor of Science in Basic Human Studies was introduced, along with the Ladderized Master's in Public Health program made in collaboration with the University of Leeds.
2024	UST inaugurates the Saints Cosmas and Damian Center for Simulation and Research, also known as Henry Sy Sr. Hall.

== Academics ==
The faculty offers the four-year Doctor of Medicine degree, a comprehensive professional academic program which combines lectures, case analyses, and practical simulation exercises. The entire curriculum focuses on the basic, clinical, and emergency medical sciences. Teaching methods make use of both classic and modern medical practices and technologies.

In 2001, the faculty adopted the problem-based learning method for use in the curriculum. The move was highly controversial. Several professors complained that the medical students were not learning the basic sciences adequately. In 2003, the curriculum format combined elements of both traditional (lecture-based) and problem-based methods. Contrary to what was expected as a decline in the quality of the learning of students by some faculty members, the first and second batches of PBL-trained physicians garnered 92% & 96% passing percentages, respectively. This data complemented the 10-year study on outcome improvements using PBL conducted at Harvard School of Medicine from 1994 to 2004.

The graduating students undergo a series of written and oral exams known as the revalida, a qualifying examination prior to graduation. In the oral examinations, groups of three students each are questioned by panels composed of three professors on basic, clinical, and emergency medical sciences. Passing the revalida is a prerequisite to graduation. Medical school graduates qualify to take the licensure exams for physicians conducted by the Board of Medicine, and under the control and supervision of the Professional Regulation Commission of the Philippines.

The faculty regularly conducts postgraduate courses covering specialties and subspecialties (i.e. sports medicine, family medicine, geriatrics and gerontology, alternative medicine).

=== Programs ===
- Undergraduate program
  - Basic Human Studies (2018) - also known as Learning-Enhanced Accelerated Program for Medicine (LEAPMed).
- Masters programs
  - Clinical Audiology (1999)
  - Pain Management (2008)
  - Public Health International (2018) - Ladderized MPH program with the University of Leeds, United Kingdom
- Professional graduate degree
  - Doctor of Medicine (1916)

=== Admissions ===
==== Doctor of Medicine ====
Deans
Name	Tenure of office
Rafael M. Ginard	1871–1886
Mariano F. Marti	1887–1896
Jose Trellos	1897-1906
Jose Luis de Castro	1907–1932
Proceso Gabriel	1933–1935
Bonifacio Mencias	1936–1944
Luis Ma. Alvarez Guerrero	1945–1949
Virgilio Ramos	1949–1965
Buenaventura UV Angtuaco	1965–1971
Gilberto L. Gamez	1971–1977
Felix A. Estrada	1977–1978
Manuel N. Borja	1978–1980
Tito P. Torralba	1981–1988
Eustacia M. Rigor	1989–1992
Ramon L. Sin	1992–1996
Rosario Angeles Tan-Alora	1996–2002
Rolando A. Lopez	2002–2006
Ma. Graciella Garayblas-Gonzaga	2007–2013
Jesus Valencia	2013–2017
Ma. Lourdes Domingo-Maglinao	2017–present

About four hundred and eighty (480) candidates are accepted into the First-Year level of the Doctor of Medicine (M.D.) program yearly. A percentage of slots is reserved for UST graduates. Foreign students comprise about 5% to 7% of the total first-year population. Among this number, approximately 80% are graduates of UST. Most of the qualified applicants are graduates of biology, medical technology, nursing, occupational therapy, physical therapy and psychology, but graduates from other bachelors of science or arts programs may be accepted. Applicant selection is based on GWA score of at least 2.00/B+/86% with no failures, and a National Medical Admission Test score of at least 85% percentile

==== Learning Enhanced Accelerated Program for Medicine (LEAPMed) ====
The Learning-Enhanced Accelerated Program for Medicine or LEAPMed is a 6-year academic program that leads to a Medical Degree. Qualified students will undergo a 2-year BS Basic Human Studies program before proceeding to the 4-year medical program leading to their Medical degree, earning 2 degrees in 6 years.

The program is offered to a limited number of highly exceptional high school graduates and is completely under the supervision of the Faculty of Medicine and Surgery.

Applicants must have graduated from Science, Technology, Engineering and Mathematics (STEM) or Health Allied academic strands in high school, or have completed an International Baccalaureate Degree program (IB) with Biology Higher Level Course with a predicted grade of 28 points.

All applicants must have a minimum general weighted average of 90%. Admission begins with the University of Santo Tomas Entrance Test (USTET), the internationally-conducted university entrance exam, along with a specialized LEAPMed segment exam covering topics on Anatomy, Botany, Chemistry, Physics, Physiology, and Zoology.

The top 220 qualifiers from the USTET and LEAPMed Entrance Test selected from the UST Predictive Score (derived from IQ, composite USTET score, and LEAPMed examination score) shall undergo an interview process to assess their preparedness for the LEAPMed program. Only ninety (90) students are accepted into the program.

== Research ==
=== Research Center for the Health Sciences ===
The Research Center for the Health Sciences (RCHS) is the university's flagship for the health sciences. It houses research specializations in dermatology, endocrinology, gastroenterology, genetics, infectious diseases, medical mducation, neurology, obstetrics and gynecology, oncology, ophthalmology, otolaryngology, pulmonology, rehabilitation medicine, research, rheumatology, and urology.

=== Journal of Medicine, University of Santo Tomas (JMUST) ===
JMUST is the official open-access, bi-annual, peer-reviewed academic journal of the faculty and the UST Hospital. The journal regularly publishes original evidence-based qualitative and quantitative research papers, clinical application papers, descriptions of best clinical practices, medical education research, review articles, research proposals, and other manuscripts covering clinical and professional topics.

It is fully adherent to the publishing standards of the International Committee of Medical Journal Editors (ICMJE), the World Association of Medical Editors (WAME), and the Committee on Publication Ethics (COPE). JMUST is indexed by the Western Pacific Region Index Medicus (WPRIM) of the World Health Organization Global Index Medicus, CrossRef, Google Scholar, Herdin Plus, and OpenAire.

The current Editor-in-Chief of the journal is Raymond L. Rosales, a neurologist from the faculty and a member of the External Scientific Advisory Board for the Collaborative Center for X-Linked Dystonia Parkinsonism (XDP) at Harvard Medical School.

== San Martin De Porres Building ==
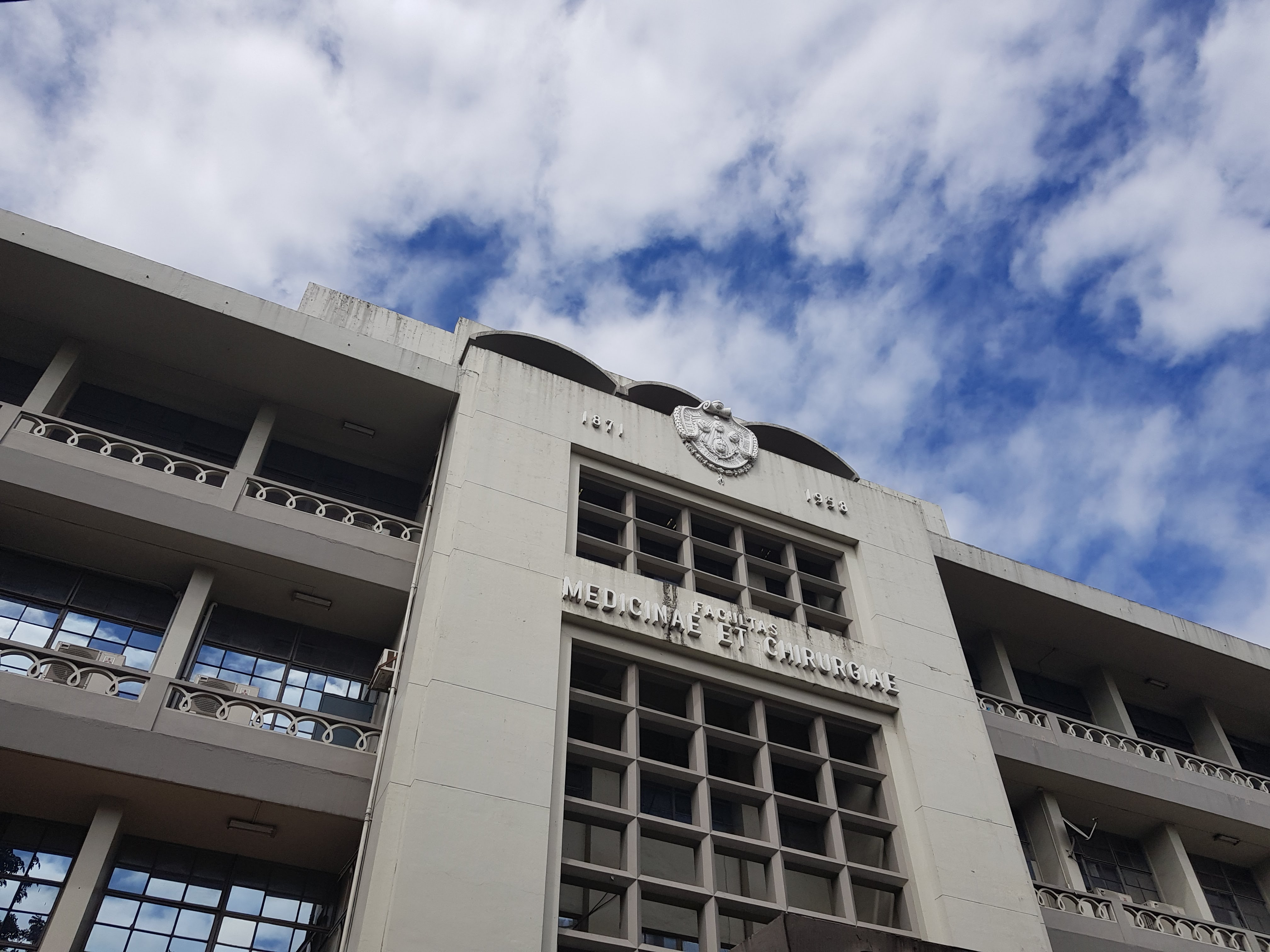
Facade of the San Martin de Porres Building

The San Martin de Porres building was erected in 1952, named after Saint Martin de Porres, the building houses the Faculty of Medicine and Surgery, the College of Rehabilitation Sciences, and the College of Nursing. Designed by Architects Manuel Francisco and Julio Victor Rocha, the building follows a Bauhaus style, and houses the largest auditorium in the University.

== Henry Sy Sr. Hall ==
The Henry Sy Sr. Hall houses the Saints Cosmas and Damian Center for Simulation and Research of the faculty. In January 2020, the faculty began its sesquicentennial celebration with the reveal of the building. It was initially named after the patron saints of the college Saints Cosmas and Damian.

In October 2022, at the end of the faculty's anniversary celebration, the building project was relaunched as the Henry Sy Sr. Hall. It was named after the founder of SM Supermalls, as requested by his daughter Teresita Sy-Coson, whose foundation donated ₱300 million to the UST Research and Endowment Foundation.

The hall houses the William F. Austin Center for Ear and Hearing Healthcare, an audiology laboratory that is named after Dr. William F. Austin, the founder of the United States–based company Starkey Hearing Technologies. The Starkey Foundation donated $200,000 for the naming rights of the laboratory.

== Student organizations ==
- Medicine Student Council
- Asian Medical Students’ Association
- Medical Missions, Inc.
- UST Medicine Glee Club
- UST Pax Romana – Medicine Unit
- UST Terpsichorian Circle

== Sesquicentennial ==
The faculty opened its 150th foundation anniversary celebration in January 2020. A fundraising and dinner-dance ball entitled, UST Med Gala was held at the Shangri-La at the Fort, Manila. One of the goals of the event was to fund the Anargyroi Foundation Inc., an independent organization that manages donations and supports the faculty's scholars. In the same month, the groundbreaking rites for the construction of the Saints Cosmas and Damian Simulation and Research Center was also held in front of the Miguel de Benavides Library. The legacy project was later named Henry Sy Sr. Hall, following the donation of ₱300,000,000 of Teresita Sy-Coson to the foundation.

== COVID-19 pandemic ==
In February 2021, Manila city mayor Isko Moreno, approved the university's plan to hold face-to-face classes for the students of medicine and other health programs. However, because of the surge of COVID-19 cases in March, the plan did not materialize. On June 9, 2021, medical clerks or fourth year medical students had limited face-to-face classes for the first time since March 2020. The faculty was the first college to hold actual classes in the university.

== Notable students and alumni ==
=== Historical Figures ===
- Jose Rizal, the national hero of the Philippines, enrolled in the faculty to pursue foundational courses in medicine. He pursued further studies in Ophthalmology at Madrid Central University (now Complutense University of Madrid), the University of Paris, and the University of Heidelberg in Germany
- Pedro Abad Santos, founder of the Socialist Party of the Philippines, anti-Japanese guerilla in World War II
- Mariano Trias, de facto Philippine Vice President of the Revolutionary Government at the Tejeros Convention
- Bonifacio Mencias, anti-Japanese guerilla martyr and former Dean of the UST Faculty of Medicine and Surgery.
- Basilio Valdes, WW2 two-star general, former Secretary of National Defense and Secretary of Health.

=== Secretaries of Health ===
Secretaries of the Department of Health

- Basilio J. Valdes
- José Locsín
- Antonio Villarama
- Paulino Garcia
- Elpidio Valencia
- Francisco Q. Duque, Jr.
- Floro Dabu
- Manuel Cuenco
- Paulino Garcia
- Antonio Periquet
- Carmencita Reodica
- Francisco Duque III

=== Medicine ===
- Fernando Calderon, first Filipino Dean of the University of the Philippines College of Medicine and first Filipino Director of the Philippine General Hospital
- Jorge Garcia, founder of the Asian Hospital and Medical Center
- Victoria Belo, founder of the Belo Medical Group
- Aivee Aguilar-Teo, founder of the Aivee Group
- Mariano M. Alimurung, co-founder of the Makati Medical Center
- José Y. Forés, co-founder of the Makati Medical Center
- Raúl G. Forés, co-founder of the Makati Medical Center
- Raymond L. Rosales, neurologist-researcher, Asian Scientist 100 laureate
- Fatima Claire Navarro, surgeon general of the Armed Forces of the Philippines
- Angeles Tan-Alora, executive director of the Southeast Asian Center for Bioethics
- Julius Dalupang, first Filipino interventional pulmonologist, performed the first endobronchial ultrasound procedure in the Philippines

=== Politics ===
- Luisa Pimentel Ejército, Former Senator and First Lady of the Philippines

=== Entertainment ===
- Maricar Reyes-Poon
- Nonoy Zuñiga
