= Yanhee Hospital =

Yanhee International Hospital
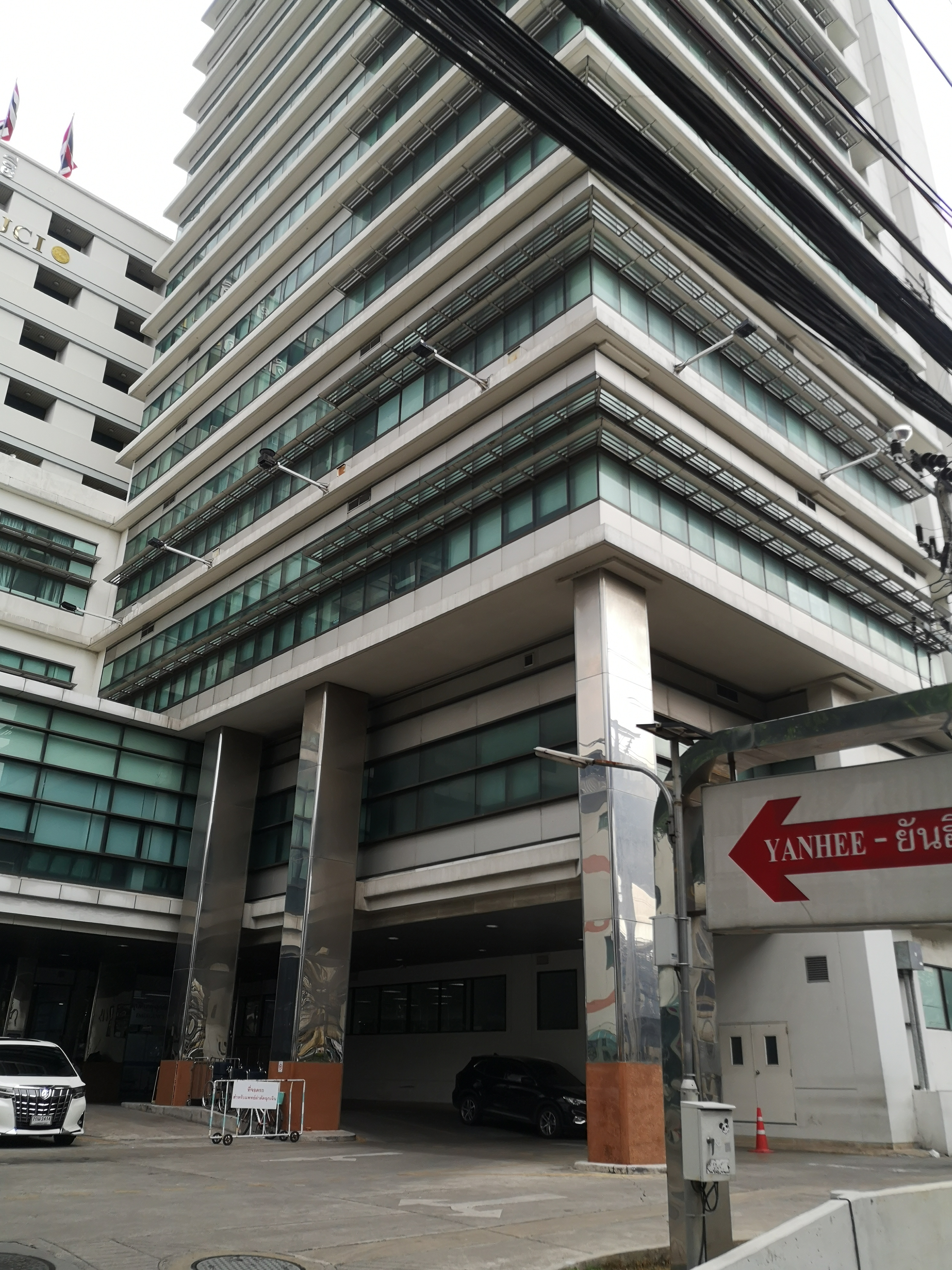
- Yanhee International Hospital, Bangkok

Geography
- Location: Bangkok, Thailand
- Coordinates: 13.799616°N 100.511254°E

Organisation
- Care system: Private
- Type: General and Specialized
- Affiliated university: None

Services
- Standards: US-sourced Joint Commission International Accredited in 2011. Implemented International Organization for Standardization - ISO 9001: 2000. Thai HACC Accreditation.
- Emergency department: Yes
- Beds: 400 Inpatient Beds

History
- Founded: 1984

Links
- Website: www.yanhee.net
- Lists: Hospitals in Thailand

Yanhee International Hospital (Thai: โรงพยาบาลยันฮี [roːŋpʰájaːbaːn jənhiː], YAHN-hee) is a multi-service general hospital in Bangkok, Thailand, that specializes in a range of medical and cosmetic services. Yanhee comprises a 15-story hospital building with a 400-bed capacity, 150 full-time doctors, 120 part-time health professionals, and 800 nurses. Additionally, Yanhee operates 95 outpatient examination rooms, 12 major and 30 minor operating rooms, an 18-bed Intensive Care Unit, emergency rooms, delivery rooms, a diagnostic laboratory and a nursery.

== Site ==
Yanhee International Hospital is located in the Bang-O, Bang Phlat District of northeastern Bangkok, on Charansanitwong Road. The hospital maintains 36 treatment centers in general medicine and cosmetics, serving about 2,000 outpatients daily. Yanhee operates 24 hours daily, with services provided by 130 full-time doctor specialists, 125 part-time specialists, and more than 1,500 healthcare professionals and support staff.

=== History ===
Yanhee International Hospital was opened in 1984 as a small outpatient clinic by Supot Sumritvanitcha, who named the hospital after the Yanhee Power Plant located nearby. The hospital is now more well-known than the power plant (which has also since changed its name), and the original Yanhee International Hospital has been expanded.

=== Facilities ===
36 treatment centres	400 in-patient beds
155 OPD examination rooms	12 operating theatres
30 operating rooms	24-hour emergency care
18-bed intensive care unit	95 outpatient examination rooms
Delivery room	Nursery
Intensive care unit	Diagnostic laboratory
Dialysis Rrom	Catheterisation laboratory
Sterile central supply department	500-space car park
CO2 laser, Q Switch ruby laser	

== Accreditation and standards ==
Early on, Yanhee International Hospital implemented the International Organization for Standardization (ISO) 9001:2000 but later shifted to the Joint Commission International Accreditation, USA starting on 22 January 2011. Yanhee International Hospital consistently renews its Joint Commission International (JCI) accreditation, successfully passing the rigorous, triennial re-accreditation process. Yanhee also has accreditation from Hospital Accreditation, Thailand.

=== Awards and recognition ===
On 25 May 2012, Yanhee International Hospital was awarded the Reader's Digest Gold Award for Asia's Most Trusted Brands. The Reader's Digest Trusted Brands Survey attempts to identify the top brands that consumers in Asia trust. Scoring for the survey is based on six core ideals: trustworthiness and credibility, quality, value, understanding of customer needs, innovation and social responsibility.

Yanhee International Hospital is known for having particularly knowledgeable and skilled surgeons for sexual reassignment surgery, also known as a sex change operation. One of Yanhee's most famous sex change patients is Beautiful Boxer star Parinya Charoenphol, known publicly as Nong Toom. Nong Toom gained fame and fortune in 1998 as a champion kickboxer at Lumphini Stadium, but in 1999 arrived at Yanhe Hospital to undergo a full sex change operation, changing her male body to the female she currently is today.

The hospital was also featured in an episode of National Geographic Channel's Taboo Series, in which a patient sought a facial feminization procedure at Yanhee.

Yanhee is also known for its famous "rollerblade girls," who zip through the hospital carrying patient documents and internal paperwork, wearing short skirts and rollerblades.

=== Humanitarian work ===
Yanhee Hospital participates in Operation Bright Smile, a program that manages free surgery and care for children born with a cleft palate. Yanhee Hospital provides surgery for 100 children with cleft lip or palate each year, free of charge, and for the more than 14 years that Yanhee has participated in the program, the hospital has helped more than 1,115 children. Yanhee continues to run the program, which, according to the hospital “lets these children face tomorrow with a brighter smile.”

In 2010, Yanhee Hospital gained popularity for accepting a charity patient who suffered from severe chemical burns on her face, which left her permanently disfigured. She had been denied re-construction surgery by several other hospitals before being accepted at Yanhee, where Dr. Sukit Wangthamran and Dr. Thawatchai Boonpattanapong performed 10 surgeries to alleviate the damage left from the accident. CEO of Yanhee, Dr. Supot Sumritvanitcha, reportedly believed the charity case to be a "good opportunity to let the people know that there is always hope for people who are at the brink of despair but continually reach out in search of a helping hand."

The hospital also organizes blood drives every year, in order to address the consistent problem of blood shortage throughout healthcare institutions. These blood drives occur every three months and Yanhee has conducted more than 15 blood drives since beginning the program.

== International patients and medical tourism ==
A large number of patients who receive medical care from Yanhee come from overseas; in fact, approximately 9,000 of the people Yanhee serves are foreigners, most of whom travel from Australia, Japan, and the United Arab Emirates. Patients from 27 different countries worldwide arrived at Yanhee in 2009, with 72% of those undergoing cosmetic procedures.

Due to the high number of foreign patients, Yanhee staffs a number of interpreters.

Yanhee's emphasis on beauty enhancement procedures is demonstrated by, of the total number of international patients that Yanhee serves, 72% receive cosmetic care, 12% receive care in general surgery and medicine, 8% receive dental care, and another 8% receive care in alternative medicine. Of the total number of cosmetic surgery procedures conducted at Yanhee Hospital, breast augmentation comprises 20%; face lift comprises 16%; blepharoplasty comprises 12%; tummy tuck, nose reshaping and liposuction comprise 9%; breast lift and hair transplantation comprise 5%; nose implants, breast reduction, and varicose vein treatment comprise 3%, hair removal comprises 2%, and other procedures comprise the remaining 1%.

== See also ==
- List of hospitals in Thailand
- List of hospitals in Bangkok
- International healthcare accreditation
- Medical tourism
