= Virgen Milagrosa University Foundation =

Roman Catholic university in Pangasinan, Philippines

Virgen Milagrosa University Foundation (San Carlos City, Pangasinan)
- Former name: Virgen Milagrosa Educational Institute
- Type: Private, Catholic University
- Established: 1958; 68 years ago
- Affiliations: Roman Catholic
- President: Dr. Ma. Lilia Posadas-Juan
- Vice-president: Dr. Angelo B. Juan
- Location: San Carlos City, Pangasinan, Philippines; 15°55′08″N 120°20′29″E
- Campus: 19.0 hectares (190,000 m^{2})
- Newspaper: The Virginian
- Patron Saint: Our Lady of the Miraculous Medal
- Nickname: VMUF
- Website: www.vmuf.edu.ph
- Location in Luzon Location in the Philippines

Virgen Milagrosa University Foundation (VMUF) is a privately supported, co-educational, Catholic university in San Carlos, Pangasinan, Philippines. It was founded in 1958 by Dr. Martin Posadas and Dr. Rosalina Q. Posadas.

VMUF offers courses in the medical and paramedical fields, in liberal and applied arts, sciences, and technical-vocational courses, senior high school, secondary, elementary and pre-school courses.

VMUF covers 19 hectares land area in MP Posadas Avenue, San Carlos City, Pangasinan, about 200 km, north of Manila, the capital of the Philippines. The Philippine national games (Palarong Pambansa) was held for the first time in there in 1995.

In 2019, VMUF was granted autonomous status by the Commission on Higher Education.

== History ==
VMUF was initiated as Posadas Clinic in 1951 and was established at Bonifacio St., San Carlos, Pangasinan in an old house of Spanish type, a residence of a prominent landowner-businessman, one-time Municipal Councilor Don Bernardino Posadas.

Later, it was renamed Posadas Medico-Dental Clinic with a 10-bed capacity, five of which were devoted to charity patients. It had provisions for surgical and X-ray services, considered to be the first in a rural area and the first air-conditioned operating room in those days. The Posadas Medico-Dental Clinic became a 4-storey hospital and was renamed Virgen Milagrosa Hospital in 1957, in honor of the Posadas family patroness, Our Lady of Miraculous Medal.

In 1958, Virgen Milagrosa Hospital School of Midwifery was granted a permit to operate (the first such school north of Manila) and it attracted students from all over the country. The 21 students from the 1st graduated batch scored 100% passing rate in Board exams and 6 out of them came among the Top 10.

Two years later in 1961, Virgen Milagrosa Hospital School of Nursing was opened and in 1964 the first graduates of the School of Nursing obtained a 100 percent passing rate in the board exams. The construction of VMUF Complex started in 1969 in a 12-hectare site at Taloy District, San Carlos and in May 1975, the Virgen Milagrosa Institute of Medicine Building was blessed and inaugurated. The first year classes in Medicine started in consortium with a medical college in Dagupan.

Later, some more new Courses were granted the permit to operate such as Health Aide & Secretarial Science. In 1976, the VM Institute continued on its own as a Foundation when the Consortium Scheme proved viable. In 1979, the first 21 medical graduates also scored a 100% passing rate in Philippines Medical Board Exams.

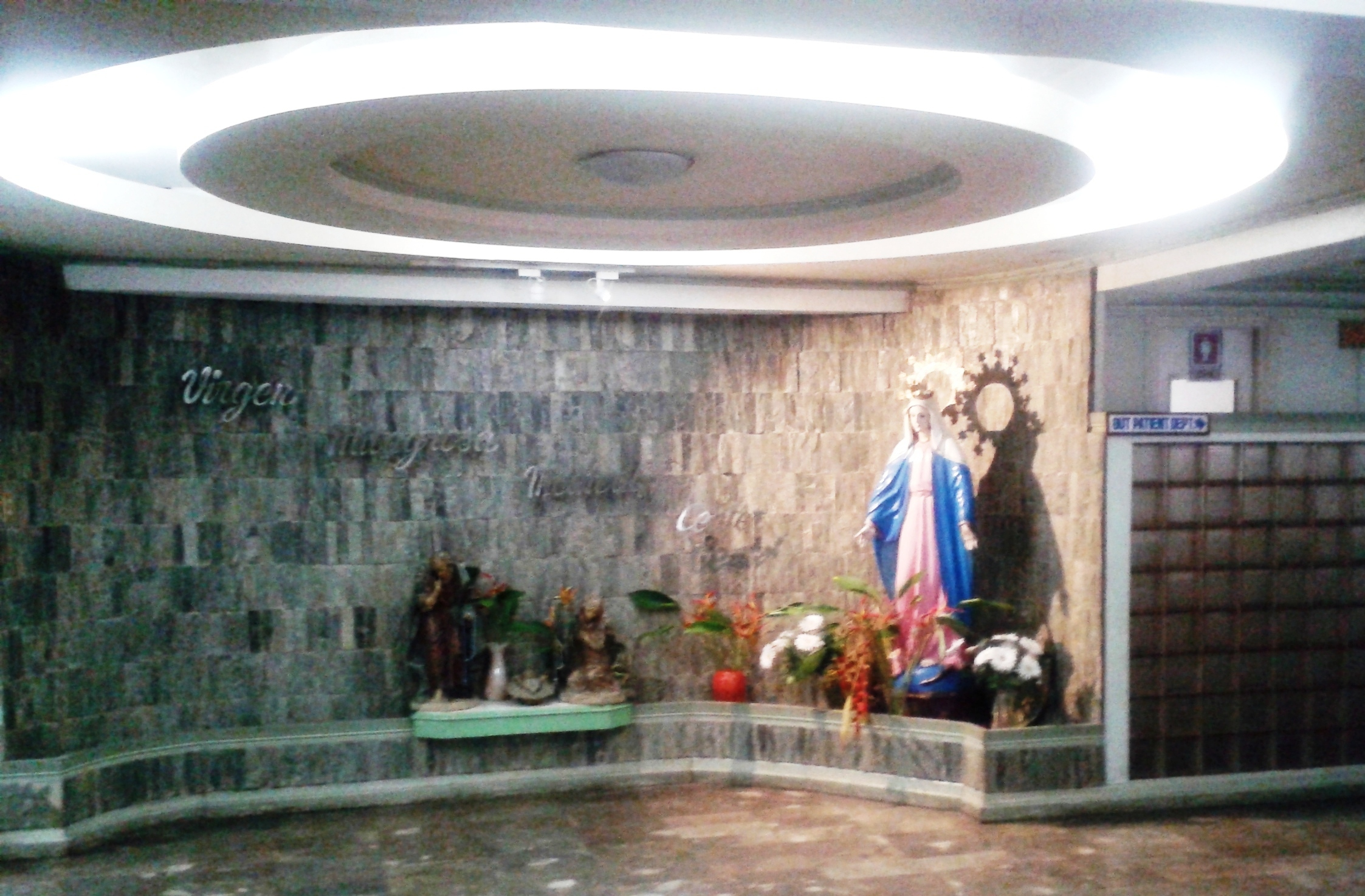
Virgen Milagrosa Medical Centre, Entrance

The construction of Virgen Milagrosa Medical Center was started in 1972 and it was completed, blessed, and inaugurated on February 16, 1974. It was a 100-bed capacity with ICU, CCU, and complete laboratory facilities.

In June 1976, Virgen Milagrosa Educational Institution (VMEI) Inc. was established and other courses such as engineering (civil, mechanical, & electrical), dentistry, veterinary medicine, physical therapy, BS nursing, pharmacy, radiologic Technology, BS secretarial administration, and machine shop were granted permits to operate.

It was also the birth of the Institutes of Arts and Science and the Secretarial Science and the permit to operate Animal Husbandry, Nutrition & Dietetics, Medical Technology and BS Biology was granted in 1977.

The VM Child Learning Center (CLC) was initiated in 1980 with Nursery and Kindergarten classes. Every year from then on, a new grade was added until all the elementary standards were established in 1986 and meanwhile the center was given full recognition in 1985.

The permit to operate two technical courses – Practical Electricity and Refrigeration & Air Conditioning was given in 1983. In 1983, Computer Education Center was inaugurated by then first Lady Madame Imelda Marcos.

The permit for BS in Electronics & Communication Engineering (BSECE) was granted in 1984 and Business Administration, Computer Education, Nutrition & Dietetics Courses were recognized in 1985.

The construction of the 5-storey VM Centrum started in 1986 and it was inaugurated on February 14, 1987. The Centrum is dedicated by the founders "to all students who have passed and will pass thru the portals of the VMUF with fond hopes that they will serve the people in their chosen professions in the spirits of a true Christians".

In 1987, the permit was given to Special Science High School(VMSSHS) and after six years of excellent performance, VMSSHS was adjudged as "One of the Excellent Private Secondary Schools in Region I"

VMEI was granted the university status with Dr. Martin P. Posadas as the 1st President on March 12, 1994.

On July 6, 1994, Dr. Martin P. Posadas died and was succeeded by Dr. Rosalina Q. Posadas as the President of VMUF.

The University hosted the Palarong Pambansa ’95(Philippines National Games) for Secondary Level in 1995. A year after the Associate in Computer Science was recognized in 1995, the BS Computer Science then followed.

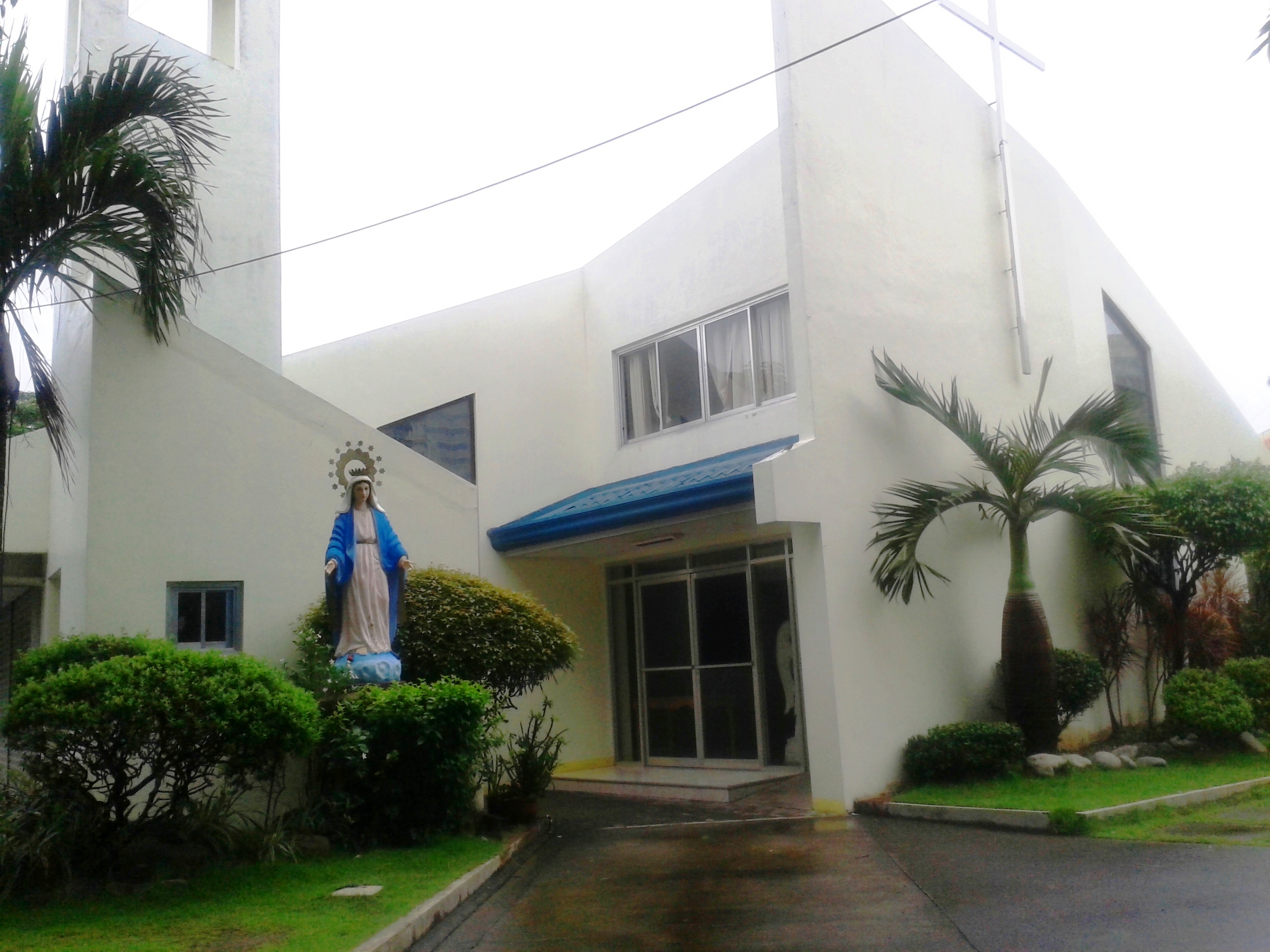
VMUF Chapel

On October 19, 1996, Dr. Rosalina Posadas died and on March 12, 1997. Dr. Maria Lilia P. Juan was installed as the 3rd President of VMUF.

Government permit was given to a 2-year Hotel and Restaurant Management TESDA course and has applied for Biomedical Technology in 2001.

On 2002, the 2-storey Engineering Building and construction of student shade in front of VM Centrum was completed.

Virgen Milagrosa University Foundation received an award from PACUCOA for being one of the TOP TEN Institutions with the most number of accredited programs (Category A) on December 13, 2004. In 2005, the University Chapel was completed and consecrated with Archbishop Oscar V. Cruz as the Mass Celebrant, and proclaimed the institution as a Catholic University.

In 2008 VMUF celebrated its 50th Golden Jubilee.

== Colleges ==
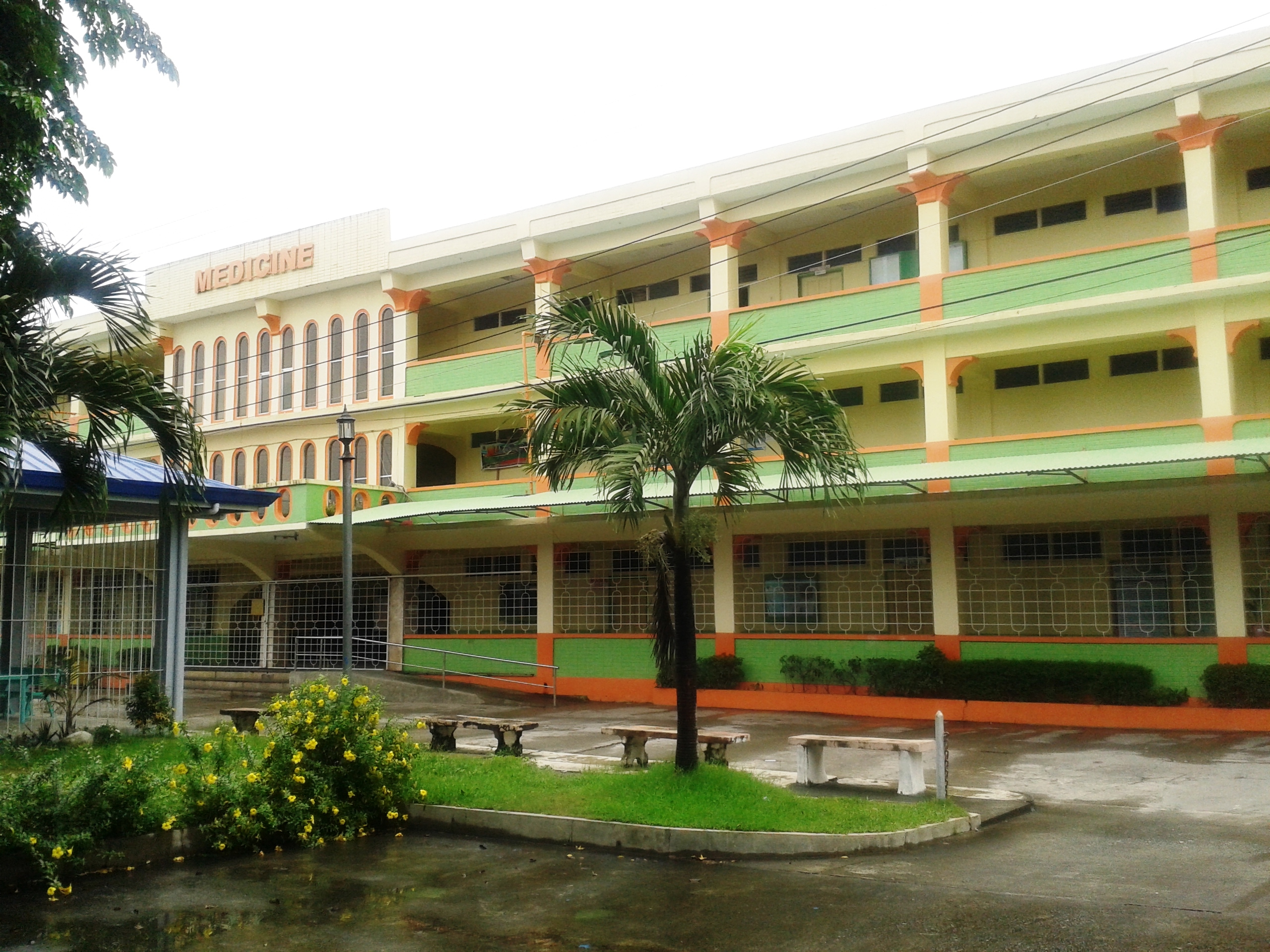
College of Medicine

- School of Law
- College of Medicine
- College of Nursing
- College of Physical Therapy
- College of Medical Laboratory Science
- College of Dentistry
- College of Pharmacy
- College of Arts and Sciences
- College of Education
- College of Engineering
- College of Business Administration and Accountancy
- College of Veterinary Medicine
- College of Midwifery, Health Care Services and Care-giving
- College of Radiologic Technology
- College of Information and Computer Studies
- College of Hotel and Restaurant Management
- Graduate School

== High schools and schools ==
- Virgen Milagrosa University Foundation Senior High School
- Virgen Milagrosa University Foundation Special Science High School
- Virgen Milagrosa University Foundation Saint Dominic High School
- Virgen Milagrosa University Foundation San Luis High School
- Virgen Milagrosa Child Learning Center

== Past presidents ==
- Martin P. Posadas, MD (UST)
- Rosalina Q. Posadas, DMD (CEU)

== Awards ==
- PACUCOA Awardee as an Institution with the highest number of Accredited Programs in the Philippines (Category A)
- The first Dental School in the Philippines accredited by PACUCOA
- The only School of Nursing in Pangasinan accredited by PACUCOA
- The only Veterinary Hospital accredited in Region I by Philippine Animal Hospital Association (PAHA)
- The only university in Region 1 granted level III accreditation for Master of Science in Teaching, Master in Public Health, BSN, BSE, BEED, BSBio, Arts and Sciences by PACUCOA.
