= Iloilo Doctors' College =

Private college in Iloilo City, Philippines

- Former names: Iloilo Doctors' Hospital School of Nursing and Midwifery
- Type: Private
- Established: 1972
- President: Dr. Ma. Lourdes L. De Leon
- Location: Iloilo City, Iloilo, Philippines; 10°41′49″N 122°33′13″E
- Colors: Blue and White
- Nickname: IDCians
- Website: www.idc.edu.ph
- Location in the Visayas Location in the Philippines

Iloilo Doctors' College is an institution of higher education located in Molo, Iloilo City, Philippines. Established on February 13, 1972, it was originally known as the Iloilo Doctors' Hospital School of Nursing and Midwifery.

== History ==
Iloilo Doctors' College (IDC) was opened its doors to the first Nursing and Midwifery students in June 1972, operating as the educational arm of the Iloilo Doctors' Hospital (IDH), which was founded the year before. A year later, the school’s operations were transferred to the newly formed Integrated Educational Corporation Iloilo (IECI), which was approved by the Securities and Exchange Commission (SEC) on February 9, 1973. The formation of IECI allowed the school to expand its facilities, including the construction of additional buildings and a 1,200-seat college gymnasium, along with a swimming pool. The first batch of Midwifery students graduated in March 1974, followed by the first Nursing graduates in March 1975.

In June 1975, the Nursing and Midwifery courses received government recognition, and the school transitioned into offering a Bachelor of Science in Nursing (BSN), phasing out the General Nursing program. In the same year, the school was granted college status and became Iloilo Doctors' College. Over the next several years, the school expanded its academic offerings to include paramedical programs such as Health Aide, Radiologic Technology, and BS Biological Science (Pre-Medicine), as well as non-health programs like BS Social Work and BS Tourism.

In July 1981, the college launched the Iloilo Doctors' College of Medicine (IDCM) in consortium with West Visayas State College (WVSC). By 1983, the College of Medicine became independent of WVSC and was officially recognized as a separate institution. The first batch of MD graduates in 1985 achieved a 100% passing rate in the physician licensure exams. The School of Dentistry was also established in June 1982, graduating its first dentists in 1986.

To meet the growing demand for new educational programs, IDC introduced courses such as BS Criminology, BS Commerce, BS Medical Technology, BS Physical Therapy, and BS Computer Science. In terms of infrastructure, the college continuously expanded its campus, including the extension of the Administration Building in 1985, the construction of a new nursing campus in 2004, and the addition of a covered gymnasium in 2005. By 2006, a new three-storey building was completed to accommodate more classrooms and administrative offices.

In 2011, IDC introduced new courses in Psychology and Business Administration, and the Child Learning Center began offering elementary school levels. Over the years, many IDC graduates have excelled in their respective professional fields, contributing significantly to both the public and private sectors.

== Departments ==
- School of Dentistry
  - Doctor of Dental Medicine
- School of Physical Therapy
  - Bachelor of Science in Physical Therapy
- College of Nursing
  - Bachelor of Science in Nursing
  - Bachelor of Science in Nursing for Professionals
  - Bachelor of Science in Nursing for Medical Graduates
  - Health Aide Course
- College of Paramedicine
  - Bachelor of Science in Medical Laboratory Science
  - Bachelor of Science in Radiologic Technology
  - Associate in Radiologic Technology
- College of Arts and Sciences
  - Bachelor of Science in Biological Science
  - Bachelor of Science in Social Work
  - Pre-Dental Course
- College of Business Administration
  - Bachelor of Science in Management
  - Bachelor of Science in Banking and Finance
  - Junior Medical Secretarial Course
  - Computer Secretarial Course
- College of Criminology
  - Bachelor of Science in Criminology
- College of Information Technology
  - Bachelor of Science in Information Management
  - Bachelor of Science in Information Technology
  - Bachelor of Science in Computer Science
  - Associate in Computer Technology
- School of Midwifery
  - Midwifery Course
- Basic Education Department (K-12)
  - Preparatory
  - Kindergarten
  - Preschool
  - Elementary
  - Junior High School
  - Senior High School
- Affiliate:
  - Iloilo Doctors’ College of Medicine
    - Doctor of Medicine
