= University of the Philippines Manila School of Health Sciences in Leyte =

Public university in Leyte, Philippines

Coordinates: 11°09′37″N 124°59′28″E

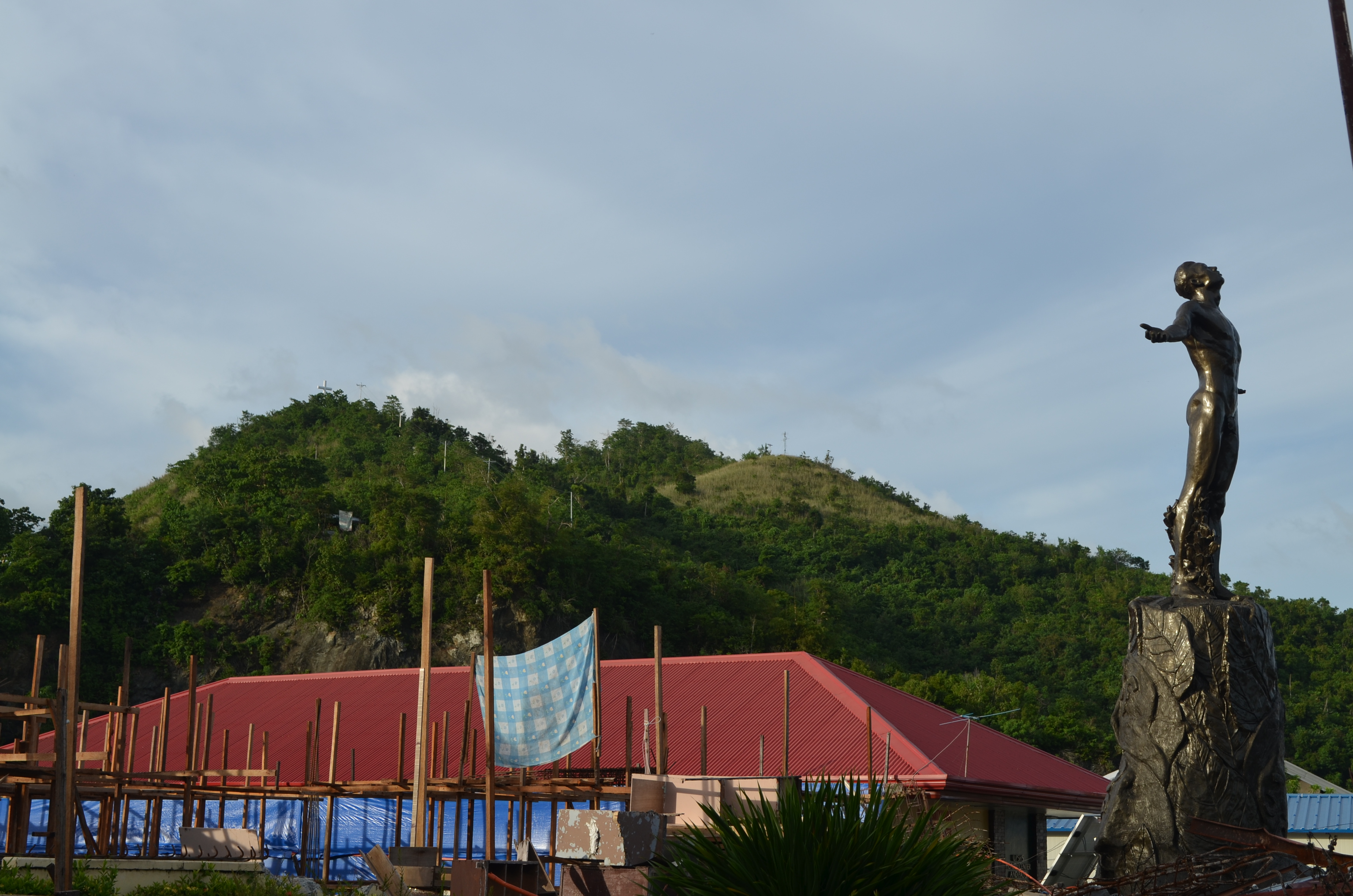
The campus of University of the Philippines School of Health Sciences in Leyte.

The University of the Philippines Manila - School of Health Sciences in Leyte (UPM - SHS) is a medical school in the Philippines supervised by the University of the Philippines, Manila. One of the schools offerings includes midwifery.

== History ==
Established in 1976, the School of Health Sciences was seen as the solution to the lack and the inequitable distribution of health professionals serving rural communities in the Philippines. The school started as a two-classroom building and a small nipa hut at the Danilo Z. Romuladez Hospital (now the Eastern Visayas Medical Center) and then in 1981 transferred to its present campus at Palo, Leyte. There are two extension campuses, namely the Baler, Aurora campus opened in 2008 and Koronadal City, South Cotabato campus opened in 2010.

In November 2013, during the onslaught of Typhoon Haiyan in the Philippines, the school's facilities were damaged and programs were interrupted. Help from various groups came quickly to rebuild the school.

== Purpose and programs ==
The mission of UPM - SHS is to train clinically competent and socially conscious health workers who will stay and serve in depressed and underserved communities especially in the rural areas. It also has the mandate to develop a training model for the training of community oriented health workers that could be replicated in other areas of the Philippines.

The school offers an innovative "step-ladder" curriculum where each student starts at a single point and exits at various levels with varying competencies, first as Community Health Worker (CHW), or Midwife then sequentially as Bachelor of Science in Nursing (BSN), and eventually as Doctor of Medicine (MD). Admissions to this innovative program depend on the needs of the community and the desire of the student to do community work. Rural communities nominate who will be the student assigned to them.
