= Chong Hua Hospital =

Private hospital in Cebu City, Philippines

- Asociación Benévola de Cebú

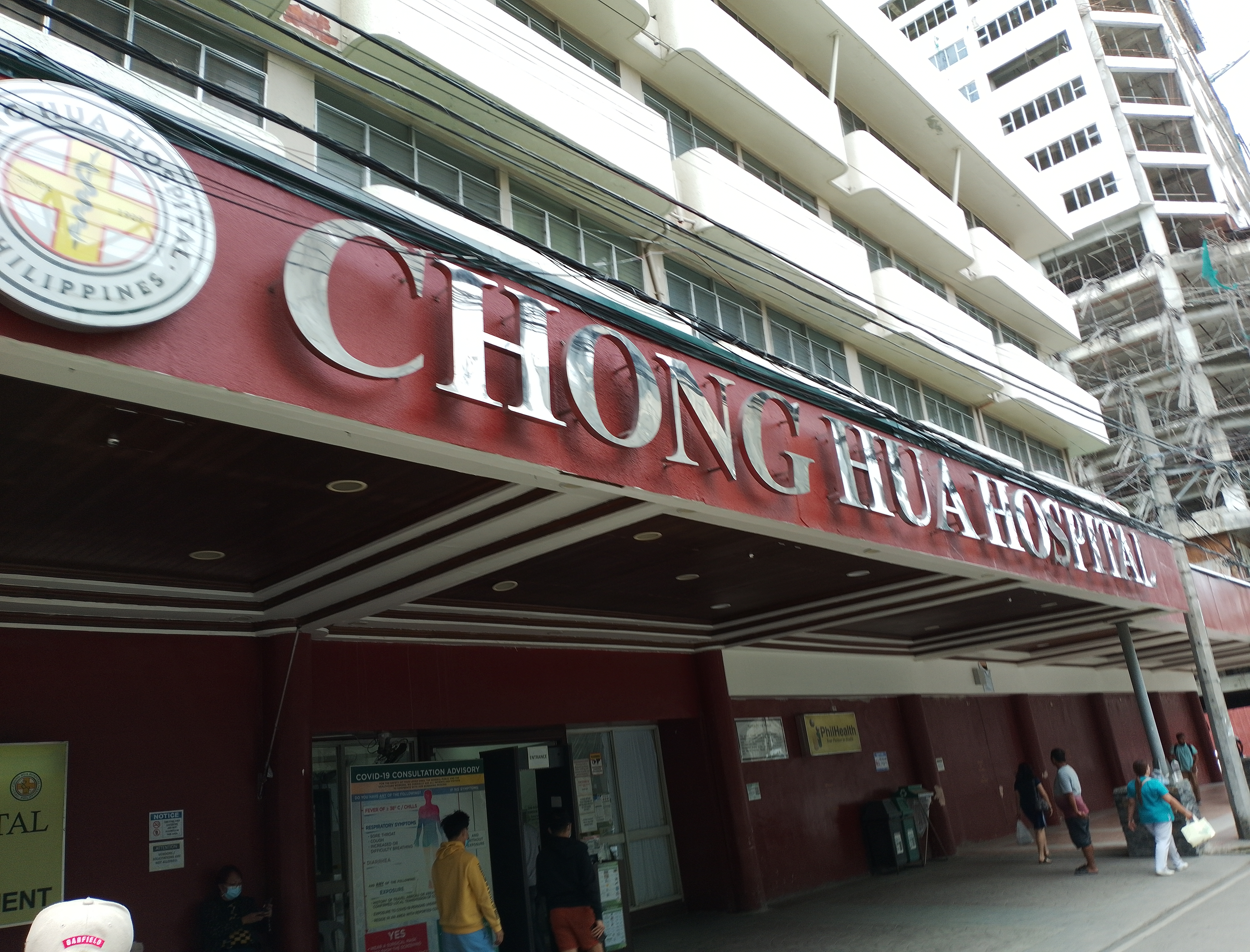
- Chong Hua Hospital in 2023

Geography
- Location: Don Mariano Cui Street, Fuente Osmeña, Cebu City, Cebu, Central Visayas, Philippines
- Coordinates: 10°18′36″N 123°53′28″E

Organization
- Type: General

Services
- Beds: 660

History
- Opened: 1909

Links
- Website: http://chonghua.com.ph/

Chong Hua Hospital (simplified Chinese: 崇华医院; traditional Chinese: 崇華醫院; pinyin: Chónghuá Yīyuàn; Pe̍h-ōe-jī: Chông-hôa I-īⁿ) is a hospital in Cebu City, Philippines. It is a non-stock, non-profit organization, owned and managed by the Asociación Benévola de Cebú.

In 2009, it became the first hospital outside Luzon and third in the Philippines to be accredited by Joint Commission International. The hospital had been able to keep its agency accreditation until 2015.

Chong Hua has 660 bed capacity and is located near the Fuente Osmeña Circle, a city landmark.

== See also ==
- List of hospitals in the Philippines
