= Silliman University Medical School =

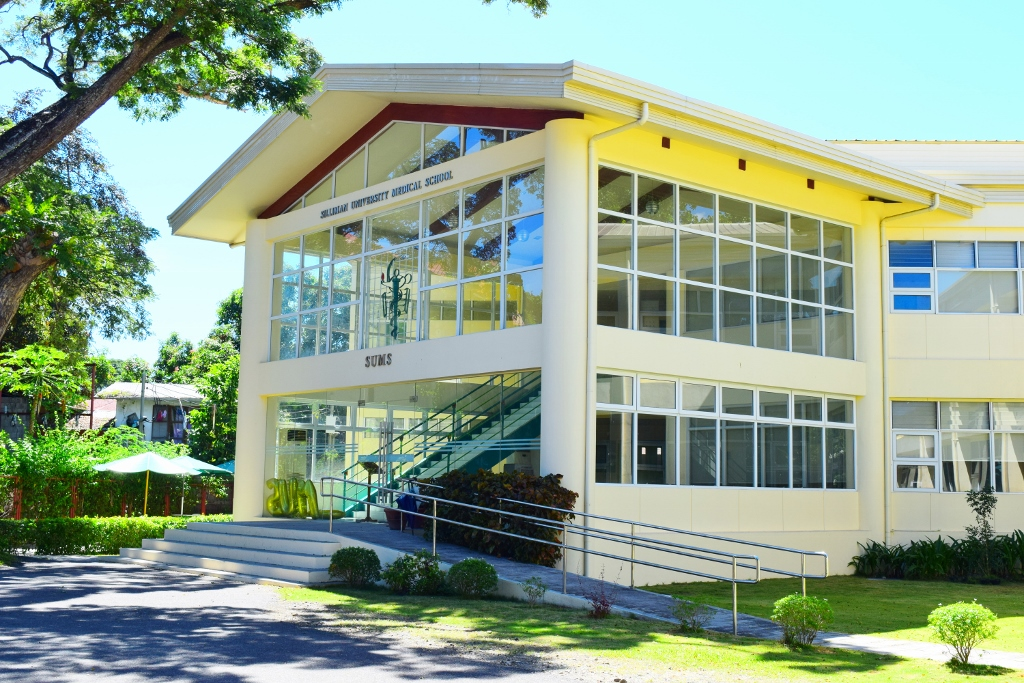
- Type: Private medical school
- Established: 2004
- Dean: Dr. Jonathan C. Amante; M.D., F.P.C.P., F.P.S.N
- Location: Aldecoa Road, Dumaguete, Philippines
- Website: www.su.edu.ph

The Silliman University Medical School (SUMS) is an academic unit of Silliman University (SU), a private university, in Dumaguete, Philippines. Established on March 20, 2004, the school used to hold classes at a two-storey annex beside the Angelo King Allied Medical Sciences Center inside the SU Campus. In 2013, the school transferred to its new building. As one of the newest medical schools in the Philippines, its pioneering batch graduated in 2009. The first batch of graduates who took the physician board exams in 2010 all passed giving the school its first 100% passing rate. The second graduating class that took the said exams in 2011 also passed giving the school another 100% passing rate. On its third batch of graduates who took the Physician Licensure Examinations in the year 2012, the medical school yet again attained a 100% passing rate, making it the third time in three consecutive years for the school to attain a perfect passing percentage. Its partner institution is the Silliman University Medical Center.

== Academics ==
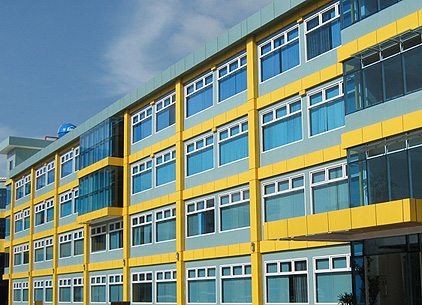
Medical Arts Building of the Silliman University Medical Center, the medical school's partner institution

=== Course and curriculum ===
The medical school confers a degree in Doctor of Medicine, with a curriculum that is based upon a combination of both the traditional and innovative strategies. The school is divided into six specialized departments: the Departments of Basic Sciences, Medicine, Pediatrics, Surgery, Obstetrics-Gynecology and the Department of Community and Family Medicine.

=== Admission ===
Enrollment in the medical school is very selective. To be admitted, applications must pass through a committee that determines whether the applicant is fit to pursue the school's program of study. Applications are to be submitted as early as January to March at the school's Admissions Office in order to be admitted for the next school year and this is done only for the first semester. Non-completion of the requirements would result in a denial of admission. The applicant must be a holder of a baccalaureate degree and must have taken the National Medical Admission Test (NMAT) given in the months of December and April. After all documentary requirements are met, prospective students will be interviewed by an Admissions Committee. Those who pass will be notified.
