= UERMMMC College of Medicine =

Medical college in the Philippines

The University of the East Ramon Magsaysay Memorial Medical Center (UERMMMC) College of Medicine is a private medical college within the UERM Memorial Medical Center in the Philippines. Recognized as a Center of Excellence in Research by the Department of Science and Technology and has Level IV Accreditation by PAASCU. It is the first and only private medical school with a Level IV PAASCU Accredited Program.

== History ==
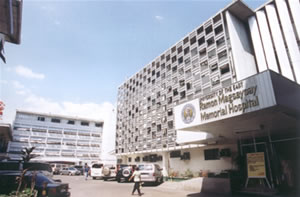
UERM Medical Center

In 1956, the University of the East College of Medicine, later known as the University of the East Ramon Magsaysay Memorial Medical Center, was established. As a non-stock, non-profit foundation named in honor of the late President Ramon Magsaysay, UERMMC was the first philanthropic institution in the country.

The College of Medicine established its first Community Health Project in Limay, Bataan; introduced the Correlated Lecture Series, the teaching of problem-oriented medical records started the teaching of Family Planning, instituted a clinical clerkship program in the USA; established a grant-in-aid scholarship program; integrated the teaching of primary health care in the curriculum; created a course on the human life cycle; introduced the 'Problem Bases' learning strategy; developed and exported the teaching of research methods to other medical schools.

The College of Medicine periodically reviews and upgrades its curriculum by instituting general changes such as the implementation of the core curriculum, granting of the M.D. degree after the Fourth year; upgrading of selected subjects; teaching by objectives; role-based curriculum and competencies; and integration of Primary health Care in the curriculum.

Through its linkages with training hospitals in the United States of America, qualified Filipino-Americans are offered the opportunity to undertake part of their clinical clerkship training in these hospitals.

Another UERM College of Medicine graduate was included no.4 and no.8 in the Top Ten examinees of March 2023 Physician Licensure Examination.

UERM obtained a 98.65% passing rate, as against the 84.94% national passing rate, when the results were released on September 19, 2019. The school was named third top performing medical school in the country.

2010s – Modernization – Major developments included:

- Establishment of the Philippine School of Prosthetics and Orthotics.
- Level IV PAASCU accreditation for the College of Medicine—the first private medical school in the Philippines to receive this distinction.
- CHED recognition as a Center of Excellence.
- Opening of: Wellness Assessment Center, HMO Concierge, MRI Center, Hemodialysis Unit
- The hospital maintained its DOH Level III General Hospital classification.

2020–Present – Pandemic and New Technology Recent years have focused on advanced diagnostics, infection control, and minimally invasive surgery.

Notable milestones include:

- 2020 – Opening of the Molecular Diagnostic and Research Laboratory during the COVID-19 pandemic.
- 2021 – Became one of the first DOH-accredited COVID-19 vaccination centers.
- 2022 – Opening of the expanded Prosthetics and Orthotics workshop.
- 2024 – UERM surgeons performed the world's second and the Philippines’ first endoscopic spine surgery for cancer at the base of the spine.
- 2025 – Launch of newly renovated, center-owned CT and MRI services, further enhancing imaging capabilities.

UERM also gained international recognition through its Philippine School of Prosthetics and Orthotics (PSPO), which participated in MrBeast's global humanitarian project, I Helped 2,000 People Walk Again. Through this collaboration, UERM's prosthetics and orthotics specialists helped provide life-changing prosthetic care to Filipino amputees, showcasing the institution's expertise in rehabilitation medicine and its commitment to restoring mobility and improving quality of life on a global stage.

== UERM Memorial Hospital ==
The UERM Memorial Hospital is the medical center for University of the East Ramon Magsaysay in Quezon City, Philippines. It opened in 1957

The hospital provides psychiatry, neurosurgery, ophthalmology, otorhinolaryngology, ambulatory medicine (OPC), rehabilitation medicine, and emergency medicine.

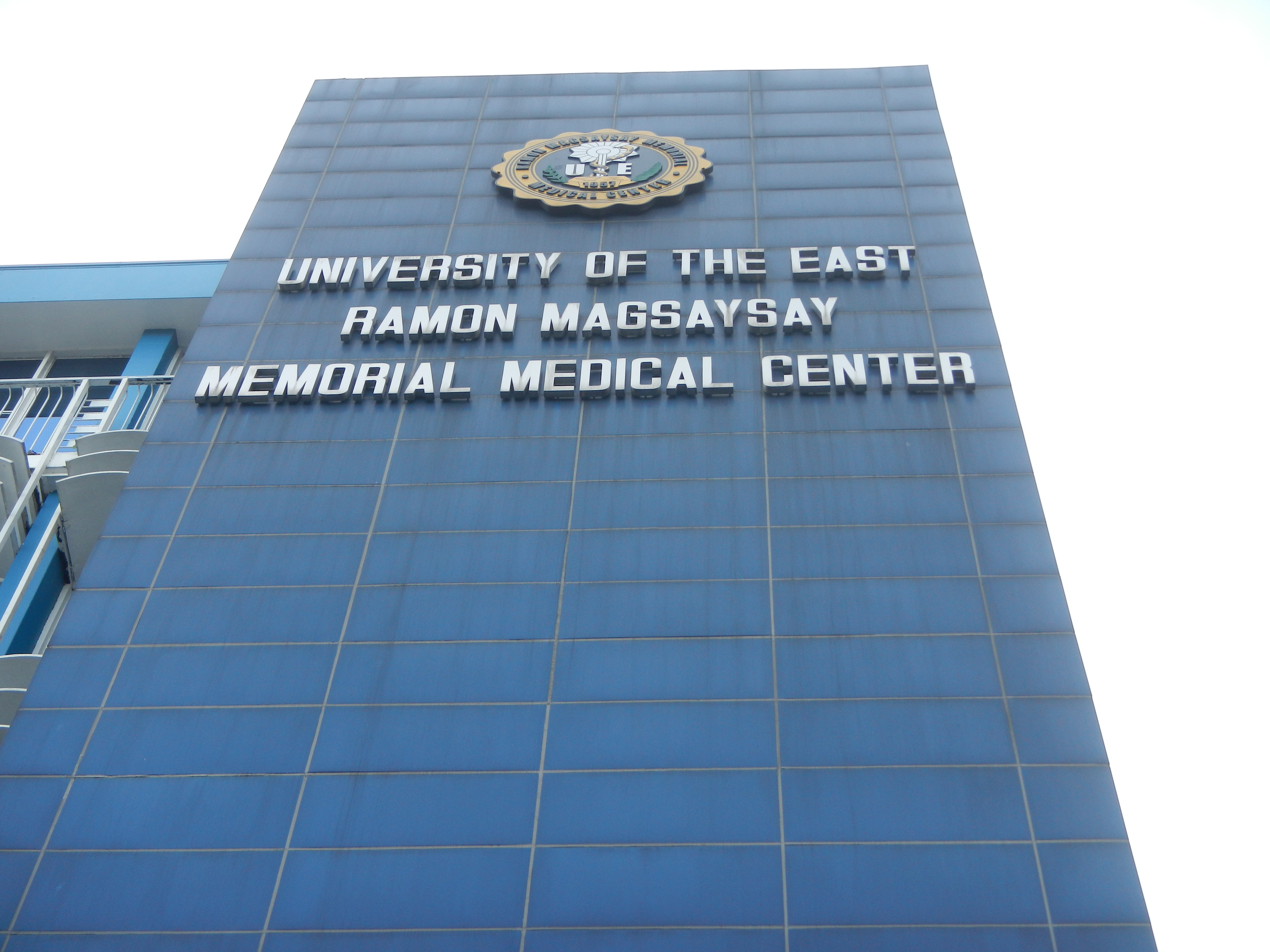
UERM Memorial Hospital, 2016

Ancillary services are: pathology (clinical, surgical and cytology), radiology, pharmacy, blood bank, cardiopulmonary laboratory, respiratory therapy, GIT-liver study unit, endoscopy unit, neurophysiology laboratory (EEG), audiology and industrial medicine.

=== Philippines' first successful endoscopic sacral metastatic tumor surgery ===
In a milestone, UERM neurosurgeon Elmer Jose Meceda performed the Philippines' first successful endoscopic sacral metastatic tumor surgery. In the five-hour minimally invasive spine surgery, he removed a 5 cm malignant tumor at the base of the spine - sacrum of 68-year-old Ligaya Aglipay from Isabela.

== Affiliated hospitals ==
- St. John's Episcopal Hospital, South Shore, Far Rockaway, New York, USA
- Affiliated Institute of Medical Education, Chicago, Illinois, USA
- Cathay General Hospital, Taipei City, Taiwan
- Buddhist Tzu-Chi General Hospital, Hualien, Taiwan
- Meadville Medical Center, Meadville, Pennsylvania, USA

== See also ==
- University of the East
