= Vicente Sotto Memorial Medical Center =

Government hospital in Cebu City, Philippines

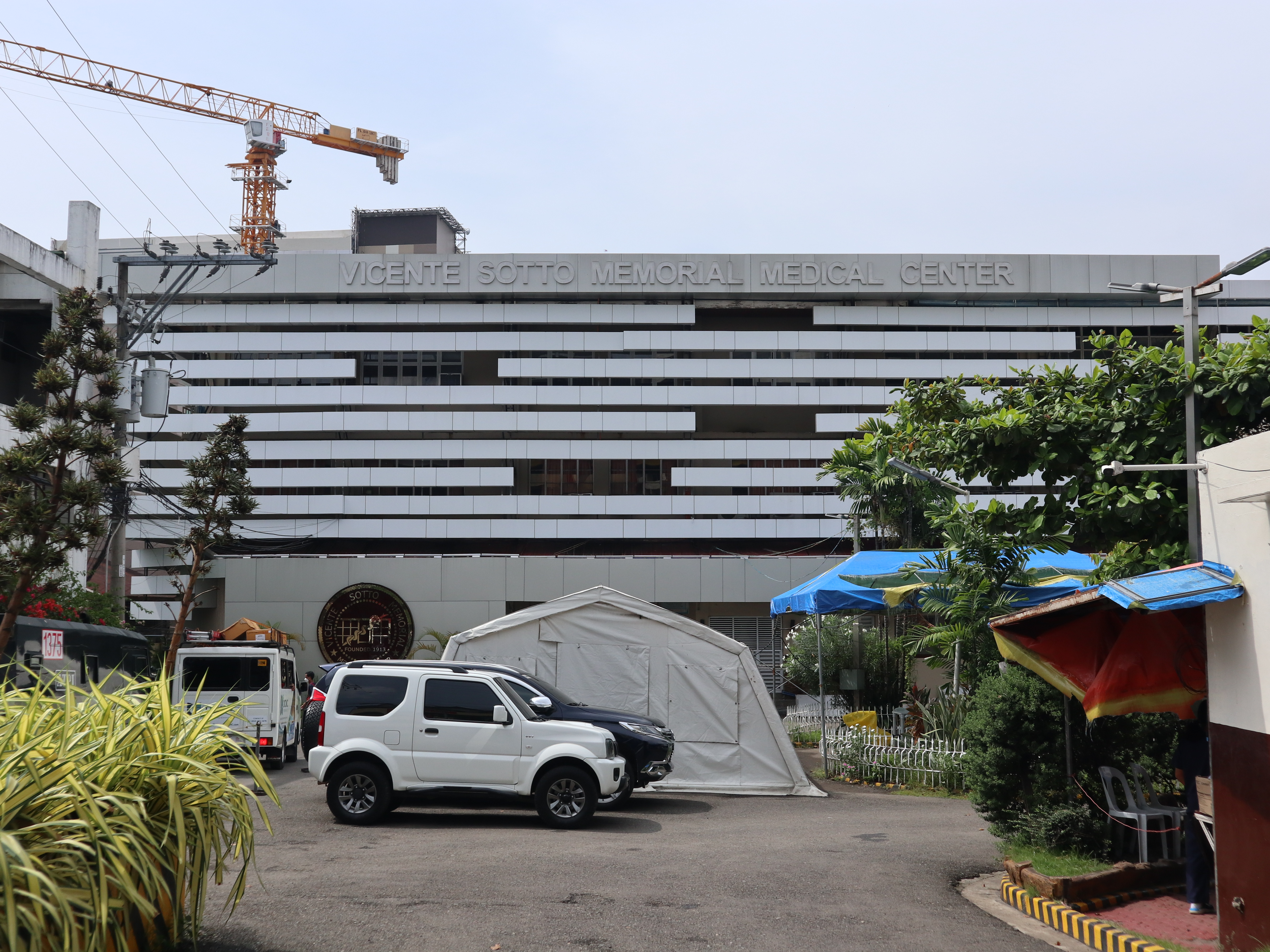

- Location within Visayas Location within Philippines

Geography
- Location: Cebu City, Cebu, Philippines
- Coordinates: 10°18′29″N 123°53′29″E

Services
- Beds: 1500

History
- Former names: Hospital del Sur; Southern Islands Hospital
- Opened: April 11, 1913; 113 years ago

Vicente Sotto Memorial Medical Center (VSMMC) is a government-owned hospital in Cebu City, Philippines.

VSMMC is a general tertiary medical center teaching training medical facility owned by the Philippine Government. It aims to provide health care services that are available, affordable, accessible and acceptable to all regardless of social status.

Its operation started as early as 1911 known as Hospital del Sur and was formally established on April 11, 1913, and through Act 2725 that it granted its legal status on January 12, 1913. The name was then changed to Southern Islands Hospital with only 30 beds at its inception.

On June 1, 1992, Republic Act No. 7588 was approved increasing the bed capacity of VSMMC from 150 beds to 400 beds. The hospital's bed capacity was increased 400 to 800 beds through Republic Act No. 8658 on June 22, 1998, and from 800 to 1200 beds through Republic Act No. 10770 on April 26, 2016. On April 29, 2022, the hospital's bed capacity was increased from 1200 beds to 1500 beds.

Presently, the VSMMC is implementing its new direction with the development of Specialty and Sub-specialties under the different clinical departments. These Specialty and Subspecialties include the General Surgery, Neuro Surgery, Uro-Surgery, Internal Medicine, Obstetrics-Gynecology, Orthopedics, Otorhinolaryngology, Ophthalmology, Anesthesiology, Pathology, Psychiatry, Radiology, Plastic and Reconstructive Surgery, Emergency Medicine; Family Medicine and Pediatrics, Rehabilitation Medicine Department, Dental Services Unit and the National Voluntary Blood Services Program.

In 2007, the hospital became involved in what is known as the "Black Suede Scandal" where a video of an operation being performed on a man who had a body spray canister stuck to his anus was leaked. The controversy eventually led to five of the doctors involved to be charged with unprofessional and unethical conduct. However, the Board of Medicine of the Professional Regulation Commission dismissed the case on July 9, 2010, after the Office of the Ombudsman-Visayas had the case dismissed for lack of legal basis.

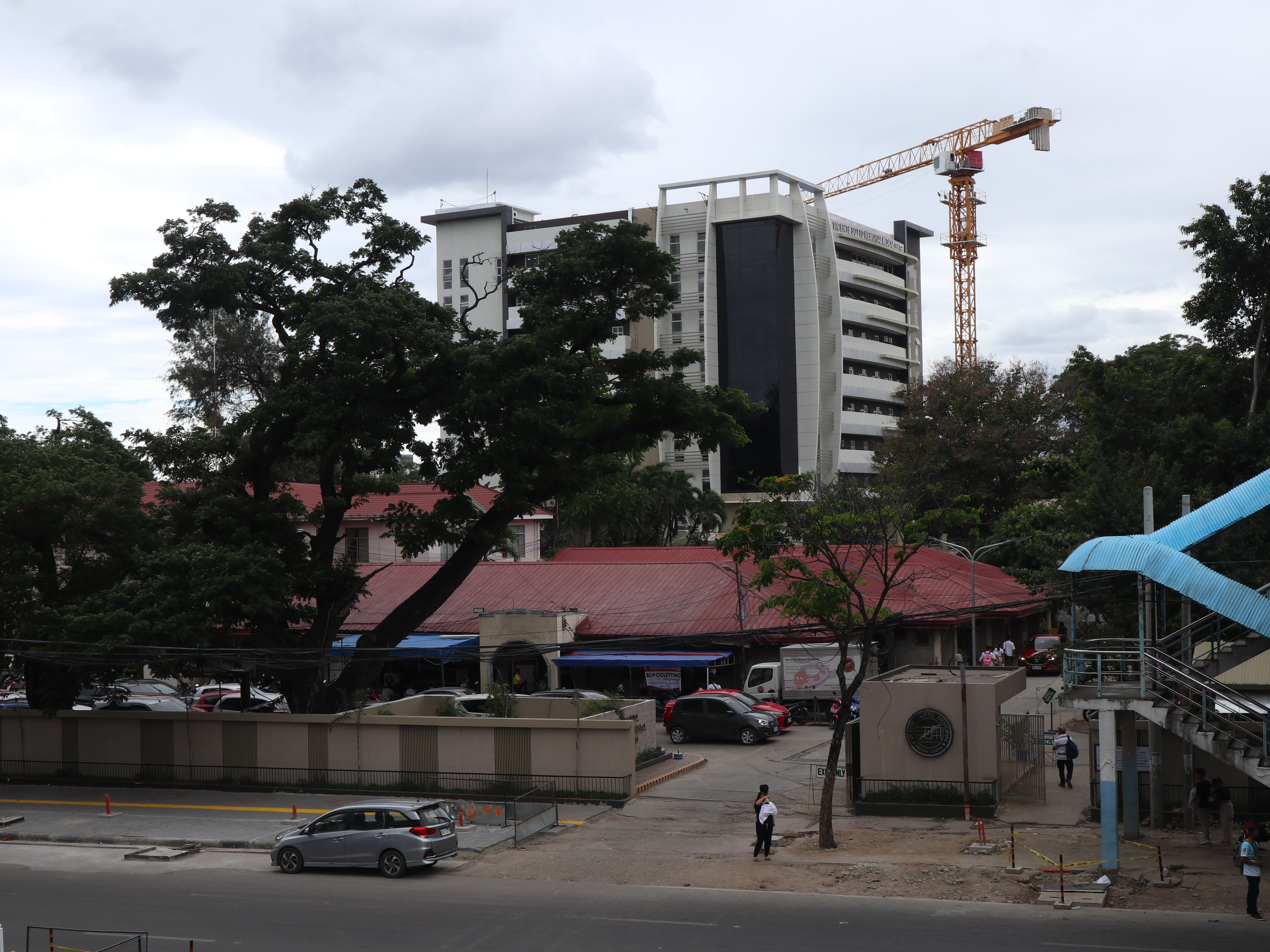
Vicente Sotto Memorial Medical Center (2024)
