= Academic dress of the University of Santo Tomas =

Used by degree candidates/holders

The University of Santo Tomas in Manila, Philippines uses a system of academic dress at ceremonial occasions for its degree candidates/holders. The customs and styles are heavily influenced by the traditions of the Spanish universities. UST also follows the traditions and canon of a pontifical university.

== When academic dress is worn ==
The full academic dress is worn during solemn investiture ceremonies and special occasions, such as, Misa de Apertura, or the Mass of the Holy Spirit, and on installation of a new rector.

== Components of the regalia ==
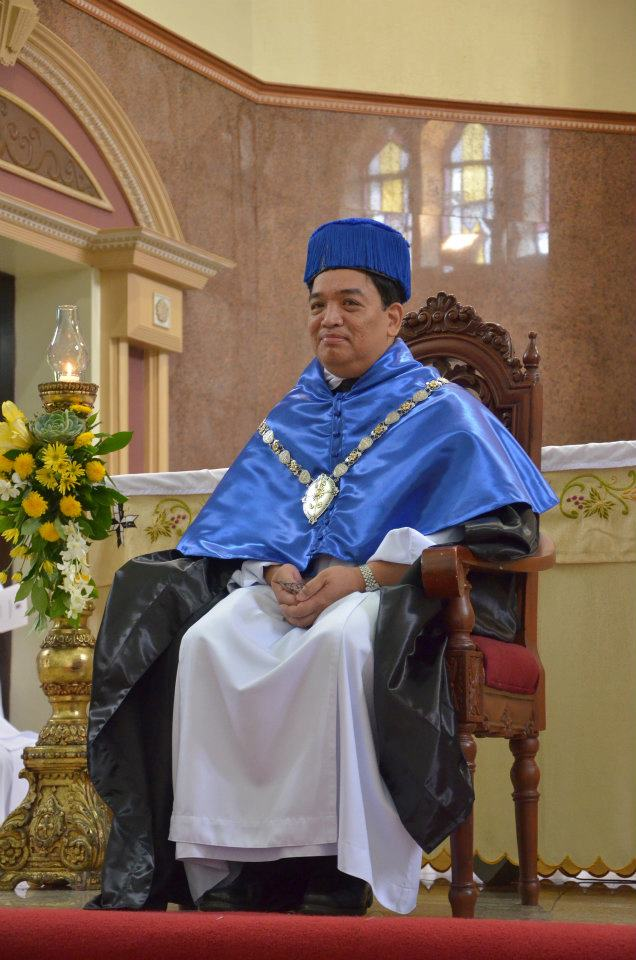
Herminio Dagohoy's installation as the 96th Rector Magnificus at the 2012 Misa de Apertura. He uses a biretta and mozzetta with the Faculty of Philosophy's color.

=== Toga ===
UST uses a black long gown, otherwise known as a toga. It is worn over a formal suit, cassock, barong tagalog, or the college uniform.

=== Headwear ===
- Biretta - Birettas are used by doctorate and master's degree holders. The black birettas used by the doctors have a colored tuft or fringes corresponding to the college color or field of study. The black birettas used by the master's degree graduates lack fringes. The Ecclesiastical Faculties use a four or a three horned biretta that bears a colored pom. The Faculty of Medicine and Surgery uses an octagonal biretta with yellow fringes.
- Mortarboard - Bachelor's degree holders use a black square mortarboard with colored tassels that correspond to their college color.

=== Mozzetta ===
Mozzettas are used by the doctorate and master's degree holders. The color depends on the academic field. The graduates of business and management, in particular, uses yellow mozzetta.

=== Hood ===
Hoods are used by the bachelor's degree graduates. The color of the hood depends on the academic field. The Faculty of Pharmacy's academic color is purple, but a second color is added to the hood of its 2 programs. Green is added to the B.S. Biochemistry graduates, while yellow is added to the B.S. Medical Technology graduates.

Graduate/official	Headwear	Hood	Additions
Rector	Octagonal biretta with tuft and fringes	Mozzetta	Rector's silver collar and medallion
Professor emeritus	Octagonal biretta with gold tuft and black fringes	Black mozzetta lined with white and gold silks	A gold collar, medallion, and signet ring
Honoris Causa	Octagonal biretta with tufts and fringes	Mozzetta	A gold medal and ring
Doctor from Ecclesiastical Faculties	Four-horned biretta with pom	Mozzetta	
Licentiate from Ecclesiastical Faculties	Three-horned biretta with pom	Mozzetta	
Doctor	Octagonal biretta with tufts and fringes	Mozzetta	
Master	Octagonal biretta with tufts	Mozzetta	
Bachelor	Mortarboard with tassel	Long hood	

== Colors of the academic colleges ==
Each college in the university has a designated color. Some colleges follow the color system used in Spain. These are the "Faculties" (with the exemption of the Faculty of Engineering) and the College of Science. The Ecclesiastical faculties adapt the color system used in Pontifical universities. Graduates of doctor and master degrees use the color of the college associated with their academic field instead of the college colors of the Graduate School, which are gold, white, and blue. Below is a list of the college colors used of the university.

Faculty/College/Institute/School	Color	Sample
Faculty of Sacred Theology	White	
Faculty of Philosophy	Blue	
Faculty of Canon Law	Green	
Faculty of Civil Law, Graduate School of Law	Red	
Faculty of Medicine and Surgery	Yellow	
Faculty of Pharmacy	Purple	
Faculty of Arts and Letters	Navy Blue	
Faculty of Engineering	Gray	
College of Education	Orange	
College of Science	Azure	
College of Architecture	Maroon	
College of Commerce and Business Administration	Gold	
Conservatory of Music	Pink	
College of Nursing	Green and gold	
College of Rehabilitation Sciences		
College of Fine Arts and Design	Maroon and green	
Institute of Physical Education and Athletics	Gold, black, and white	
Alfredo M. Velayo College of Accountancy	Red and beige	
College of Tourism and Hospitality Management		
Institute of Information and Computing Sciences	Crimson and gray	

== See also ==
- Academic Dress
- es:Indumentaria universitaria en España
