= Timeline of the University of Santo Tomas =

This is a timeline of the history of the Pontifical and Royal University of Santo Tomas, the oldest university in Asia, comprising important events in the history of the university and of the development of Philippine higher education in general. To read about the background to these events, see History of the University of Santo Tomas. See also the history of the Rector Magnificus of the University of Santo Tomas, and the Santo Tomas Internment Camp

== 16th century ==
Year	Date	Event	References
1581	March	Arrival of the first Dominicans in the Philippines	
1587	21 July	Arrival of Miguel de Benavides with the second batch of Dominicans in the Philippines, and the establishment of the Province of the Most Holy Rosary of the Philippines	
1593		Dominicans pioneer printing in the Philippines by producing using the old technique of xylography	(Note: This technique produced the Doctrina Christiana en Lengua Española y Tagala and the Doctrina Christiana en Lengua y Letra China, the first books in the Philippines)

== 17th century ==
Year	Date	Event	References
1602		Fray Blancas de San Jose, O.P. together with Tomas Pinpin succeeds in making typographic printing through movable type	
1605	24 July	Archbishop Miguel de Benavides bequeaths his library and a total amount of ₱1,500 for the establishment of a seminary college	(Note: The nucleus of ₱1,500 for the foundation of a seminary-college was increased to ₱7,140 by donations made by Pablo Rodríguez, Andrés Hermosa, and Juan Morales)
1609		The Dominicans granted permission to open a seminary-college by Philip III of Spain	
1609		Philip III issues a royal cedula requesting from Governor Juan de Silva and the Real Audiencia a report on the projected college	
1611		Philip III's permission arrives in Manila	
1611	28 April	Act of Foundation for the establishment of a seminary-college signed	(Note: The Document of Foundation was signed by Fr. Baltasar Fort, O.P., Provincial of the Dominican Province of the Holy Rosary, Fr. Francisco Minayo, O.P., Prior of the Santo Domingo Convent, and Fr. Bernardo de Santa Catalina, O.P., Commissary-General of the Holy Office of the Philippines. Notary Juan Illian witnessed the signing of the act of foundation.)
1612		Fr. Domingo Gonzalez, O.P. appointed to work on the completion of the organization of the college	
1612		The seminary-college opens as the Colegio de Nuestra Senora del Rosario	
1619	29 June	The Colegio given authorization to confer academic degrees in Theology and Philosophy by the Holy See	
1619		Governor Alonso Fajardo de Entenza recognizes the Dominican Colegio	
1617		The college renamed as the Colegio de Santo Tomas	
1624		The Faculties of Philosophy and Theology implemented by the royal order of Philip IV of Spain	
1625		Tomas Pinpin's printing press settles at the Colegio	
1645	20 November	Pope Innocent X raises the college into the status of a university upon petition of King Philip IV of Spain	
1645		The Master General of the Dominican Order assumes the power of appointing the Rector Magnificus of Santo Tomas by virtue of the permission granted by Pope Innocent X	
1680	12 May	King Charles II of Spain extends royal patronage to the university	

== 18th century ==
Year	Date	Event	References
1734	2 September	The Faculties of Civil Law and Canon Law established by virtue of a royal cedula of Charles II of Spain	
1762		Rector Fr. Domingo Collantes organizes four companies of university students to help in the defense of the city against the British Invasion of Manila	
1768	17 May	Royal decree banishing the Society of Jesus from Spain and the Spanish dominions reaches Manila	
1769		The closure of the Jesuit Universidad de San Ignacio leaves the university as the only institution of higher learning in the colony	
1773	21 July	Clement XIV suppresses the Society of Jesus in his papal brief Dominus ac Redemptor	
1781		Charles III of Spain authorizes the university to prepare its own statutes, independent of those of the University of Mexico	(Note: Ever since its foundation in 1611, the university's constitution was based on that of the Real y Pontificia Universidad de Nueva España)
1785	7 March	Charles III grants the university the title of Very Loyal	
1785	20 May	The university granted the officially granted the title Royal by Charles III	

== 19th century ==
Year	Date	Event	References
1865		Isabel II of Spain declares the University of Santo Tomas as the center for public education throughout the Philippines	
1870		The University of Santo Tomas taken over by the Colonial Government and renamed as Universidad de Filipinas by virtue of an edict issued by Segismundo Moret	(Note: The Moret code never got implemented due to the restoration of the monarchy in Spain)
1871	May	Faculties of Medicine and Pharmacy established as the first schools of medicine and pharmacy in the Philippines	
1874		The School of Notaries established by royal order of Alfonso XII	
1875	29 October	The Hospicio de San Juan de Dios becomes the clinical training institution for medical students of the Faculty of Medicine and Pharmacy of the university by virtue of royal order of King Alfonso XII	
1879		School of Midwifery opened	
1878	December	Rector Fr. Joaquin Fonseca, O.P. conceives the idea of erecting a monument in honor of university founder Archbishop Miguel de Benavides	
1887	23 March	Prof. Mariano Marti, M.D. establishes residency and Externship programs at the Hospicio de San Juan de Dios	
1895		The defunct Jesuit Universidad de San Ignacio incorporated into the Faculty of Medicine and Pharmacy of the university	
1898		The university closes its doors due to the Philippine Revolution and the Spanish–American War	
1899		The university resumes its classes	

== 20th century ==
Year	Date	Event	References
1902	17 September	Pope Leo XIII bestows upon the university the title of Pontifical	
1907	18 May	Faculty of Engineering established as the first engineering school in the Philippines	
1911	16 December	Tricentennial celebration of the university	
1911	20 December	The laying of the cornerstone of a new building of the university in Sampaloc	
1924		The Faculty of Pharmacy opened to women enrollees	
1925		English replaces Spanish as medium of instruction	
1925	June	The College of Education established at the Intramuros Campus	
1926	January	The College of Science of the university officially established	
1926		Faculty of Philosophy and Letters becomes co-educational	
1927	5 July	First Classes held at the University Sampaloc Campus	
1928	16 January	The Varsitarian, the official student publication of the university, officially organized	(Note: The Varsitarian is currently the oldest Catholic School Publication in the country)
1932		College of Commerce and the Faculty of Medicine also becomes co-educational	
1932	28 August	The University Gymnasium officially inaugurated by Governor Theodore Roosevelt Jr.	
1933	7 March	UST Swimming Pool, the first Olympic-size swimming pool in the country, opened to the students by Senate President Manuel Quezon	
1941	8 December	Start of the Japanese invasion of the Philippines	
1941	26 December	Manila declared an open city	
1942	2 January	Japanese Forces occupy Manila	
1942	4 January	Japanese forces converts the university campus at Sampaloc into an internment camp	
1944	8 February	Arson was created to the original campus at Intramuros by the Japanese forces	
1945	3 February	American Liberation of the Santo Tomas Internment Camp	
1946		The university reopens at the Sampaloc Campus	
1946	7 March	UST Hospital formally opened	
1946	13 November	The Benavides Monument re-erected at the university campus in Sampaloc	(Note: The place where the Benavides Monument was re-erected was named as the Plaza Benavides)
1947	30 April	Pope Pius XII bestows to the university the title The Catholic University of the Philippines	
1949	20 December	The university lot in Intramuros sold to the Philippine American Life Insurance Co.	
1953	July	Completion of the installation of Francesco Monti's statues atop the Main Building	
1956	16 December	The university radio station DZST begins operation	(Note: DZST later became Radio Veritas)
1961		Semiseptcentennial celebration of the university	
1961	18 July	The Spanish Government grants the Blue Ribbon of The Civil Order of Alfonso X el Sabio to the university	(Note: The Blue Ribbon of The Civil Order of Alfonso X el Sabio is the highest civil decoration in Spain)
1966	6 March	Formal inauguration of the University Hospital Clinical Division	
1970	28 November	Pope Paul VI visits the university	
1971	October 9	Leonardo Legaspi, O.P., elected as the first Filipino Rector Magnificus of the university	
1977	January	Mother Teresa of Calcutta visits the university	
1977	January	The Pautakan Contest officially organized by The Varsitarian	(Note: The Pautakan is currently the longest running quiz bee in the country)
1981	18 February	Pope John Paul II visits the university	
1981	12 June	The Student's Democratic Party established as the first student political party in the Philippines	
1991	19 December	First Paskuhan Celebration	
1992	1 February	The University of Santo Tomas (UST) Singers officially organized	
1993		UST Press renamed as UST Publishing House	
1995	13 January	Second Papal visit of Pope John Paul II to the university	

== 21st century ==
Year	Date	Event	References
2002	14 June	First Thomasian Welcome Walk held	
2004	10 November	The Alfredo M. Velayo College of Accountancy formally established	
2006	26 April	The Institute of Tourism and Hospitality Management officially separated from the College of Education	
2009	18 December	Quadricentennial countdown to 2011 launched during the Paskuhan Celebration	
2010	January	Simbahayan 400, the Quadricentennial's "centerpiece project", officially launched	
2010	25 January	The University Main Building, Central Seminary, Arch of the Centuries, and Grandstand with Open Spaces officially declared as National Cultural Treasures by the National Museum of the Philippines	
2010	24 May	The University of Santo Tomas campus officially declared as a National Historical Landmark by the National Historical Commission of the Philippines	
2010	17 June	The Lumina Pandit exhibit launched	
2011	21 January	Commemorative 200-peso bills with the UST Quadricentennial logo issued by the Bangko Sentral ng Pilipinas	
2011	24 January	Opening of the Jubilee Door	
2011	27 January	Unveiling of the Quattromondial and the formal opening of the Quadricentennial celebrations	
2011	21 September	Quadricentennial exhibit at the United Nations Educational, Scientific, and Cultural Organization (Unesco) Headquarters in Paris officially launched	
2012	27 January	Neo-Centennial Celebrations officially launched	
2012	11 June	Mahathir Mohamad, former Malaysian Prime Minister, conferred with the title Honorary Professor.	
2012	6 July	Queen Sofía of Spain visits the university	
2012	26 November	Lech Wałęsa, former Prime Minister of Poland and Nobel Laureate, conferred with the title Honorary Professor	
2015	18 January	Pope Francis visits the university	
