= University of Santo Tomas Education High School =

Roman Catholic laboratory school of the University of Santo Tomas

Location
- Albertus Magnus Building, Ruaño Drive, UST, Sampaloc, Manila; 14°36′38″N 120°59′29″E

Information
- Established: 1 August 1950
- Principal: Assoc. Prof. Marielyn C. Quintana, LPT, PhD
- Regent: Rev. Fr. Art Vincent M. Pangan, O.P., SThL
- Grades: 7 to 12
- Enrollment: 337 (AY 2016-2017)
- Colors: Blue, black, orange, and yellow
- Newspaper: The Rosarian
- Yearbook: Fides
- Patron saint: Joseph Calasanz
- Website: ehs.ust.edu.ph

The University of Santo Tomas Education High School, popularly known as UST-EHS or UST Educ High, is a laboratory school for the training and formation of future Catholic teachers.

== History ==
The Education High School (EHS) is a separate institution from the UST High School. EHS was established to give Catholic education to students who cannot afford to pay the fees required by other schools. It also serves as the training ground for fourth-year BSE students of the UST College of Education. This laboratory school was established during the time of Rector Magnificus Rev. Fr. Angel De Blas, O.P., with the help of the Dean of the College of Education, Rev. Fr. Aurelio Valbuena, and Mrs. Caridad Sevilla, the EHS principal, and the different critical teachers of the College of Education. Classes commenced on August 1, 1950.

There were 361 students in the first enrollment of the EHS. There were 10 sections in the first year, 2 sections in the second year, and 2 for the third year. Half of those sections were attended in the morning by girls, half in the afternoon by boys.

In 2025, the Education High School-Senior High School or "ESHS," commenced as part of the institution’s 75th foundation anniversary.
