= University of Santo Tomas College of Commerce and Business Administration =

Business school of the University of Santo Tomas

Coordinates: 14°36′35.5″N 120°59′21.5″E

- Former names: 1930 – Department of Commerce (College of Education); 1933 – School of Commerce; 1934 – College of Commerce; 1988 – College of Commerce and Accountancy
- Established: 1933
- Dean: Al Faithrich C. Navarrete
- Regent: Senen R. Ecleo
- Students: 2,619 (as of 2024)
- Location: St. Raymund de Peñafort Building, Quezon Drive, UST, Sampaloc, Manila
- Patron saint: Saint Matthew the Evangelist
- Colors: Gold
- Website: commerce.ust.edu.ph

The University of Santo Tomas College of Commerce and Business Administration is the business school of the University of Santo Tomas in Manila, Philippines. The college offers programs in Financial Management, Marketing Management, Human Resources Management, Business Economics, and Entrepreneurship. The college is one of the first business schools in the Philippines.

== History ==
Established as a department of the College of Education and supervised by the Fr. Silvestre Sancho, O.P. in 1930, the Department of Commerce started with only twelve enrollees and offered a two-year associate program in Commercial Science. Consistent increase in enrollment lead to it being elevated into a School of Commerce in 1933 and the Department of Public Instruction granted its eventual recognition of the School's four-year degree program, Bachelor of Science in commerce. Once the Bureau of Education allowed the School of Commerce to operate as a college, the College of Education granted its autonomy in 1935. Dr. Stanley Prescott was given the honor and the responsibility to be the first Dean of the College of Commerce.

In 1940, Fr. Pedro Mateos, O.P. assumed the position of Dean and it was during his term where new review courses in Accounting and Law (for Accounting) were introduced to enhance the seniors’ chances in passing the CPA licensure examinations. The college was forced to close during the Second World War. During the war the university was transformed into an American internment camp by the Japanese which was responsible for imprisoning more than 4,000 American citizens. It was later reopened in June 1945. In 1947, student enrollment reached 518 and steadily increased to 722 by 1948.

Under the deanship of Dr. Mariano Apacible, the four major programs of the college: Accounting, Banking and Finance, Economics and Management, were fortified with pedagogy improvements as well as the introduction of new techniques in teaching. The student population at this time rose to 1,244.

The year 1981, the college offered a variety of programs: Accounting, Banking and Finance, Economics, Management and Marketing. In later years, the majors were limited to Accounting, Business Administration and Economics. Specialized courses in Management, Marketing, Banking and Finance were grouped into one major, Business Administration, to provide the graduates with more flexible and greater job opportunities in different fields of business and industry.

To further improve the capacity to pass the board examinations of the college's aspiring CPA's, the academic program BS Commerce major in Accounting was replaced with Bachelor of Science in Accountancy.

In 1988, the college officially became known as the College of Commerce and Accountancy and it was also in this year when the college applied for its re-accreditation (the first one was in 1984).

The University of Santo Tomas College of Commerce Alumni Foundation, Inc (COCAFI), a private non-stock and non-profit foundation, was founded in 1992.

In 1996, and in response to the growing information technology needs of the commercial industry, the college offered a new program: the B.S. Commerce major in Information System Management. However, due to the university's policy to group all computer-related programs in one college, this major was transferred to the College of Science in June 1999. The last batch of students with the degree B.S. Commerce major in Information Systems Management graduated in March 2002.

In 1999, under Dean Amelia Halili, the college was selected as a Center of Development by the Commission on Higher Education. Also, for its Achievements in Accounting Education, as shown by the performance of its graduates in the CPA Board Examinations from 1996 to 2000, an Achievement Award was given to the College on November 15, 2000, by the Professional Regulation Commission (PRC) as it ranked first among those colleges/universities with 100 or more successful examinees.

In 2004, the Department of Accountancy separated upon recommendation of and in coordination with the UST College of Commerce Alumni Foundation, Inc. (COCAFI) Thus, the accountancy unit was moved to the newly formed college AMV College of Accountancy.

In the efforts towards asserting its presence as a primary model business school in the country, and pursuant to the Commission on Higher Education's Memorandum Number 17, the college revived its entrepreneurship program and offered the BSC in Entrepreneurship more popularly known as the Triple-E Program (“Entrepreneurship and Ethics Education towards Equity”) in 2004 and a straight program, BS in Entrepreneurship was initially offered in 2007.

The latter part of the 2006–2007 academic year signaled the beginning of even more significant changes compressed in even lesser time. With Dean Helena Maria F. Cabrera at the helm, and pursuant to the Commission on Higher Education's Memorandum Number 39, the Bachelor of Science in Commerce academic programs were gradually phased out and were replaced with the Bachelor of Science in Business Administration academic programs offering a wider range of specialized majors: Business Economics, Financial Management, Human Resource Development Management, Marketing Management and Operations Management (initially offering of this program has been deferred).

The college was then renamed the College of Commerce and Business Administration in the same year when the BSBA major in Financial Management and BSBA major in Marketing Management were initially offered. It was in March 2009 when the university through the college first conferred these degrees on very first graduates of these degrees.

The college is located in the third and fourth levels of Saint Raymund de Peñafort Building in the northeastern part of the UST campus. The college shares the building with the UST Faculty of Arts and Letters which occupies the first and second levels. On July 5, 2015, the building was hit by fire affecting at least 4 classrooms.

The college has almost 4,000 students, majority of which belongs to the Pre-Com Department which has now been renamed as the Basic Business Education Department (BBED). In recent years, it has been yielding the largest number of graduates (approx. 700–900).

== Degree programs ==
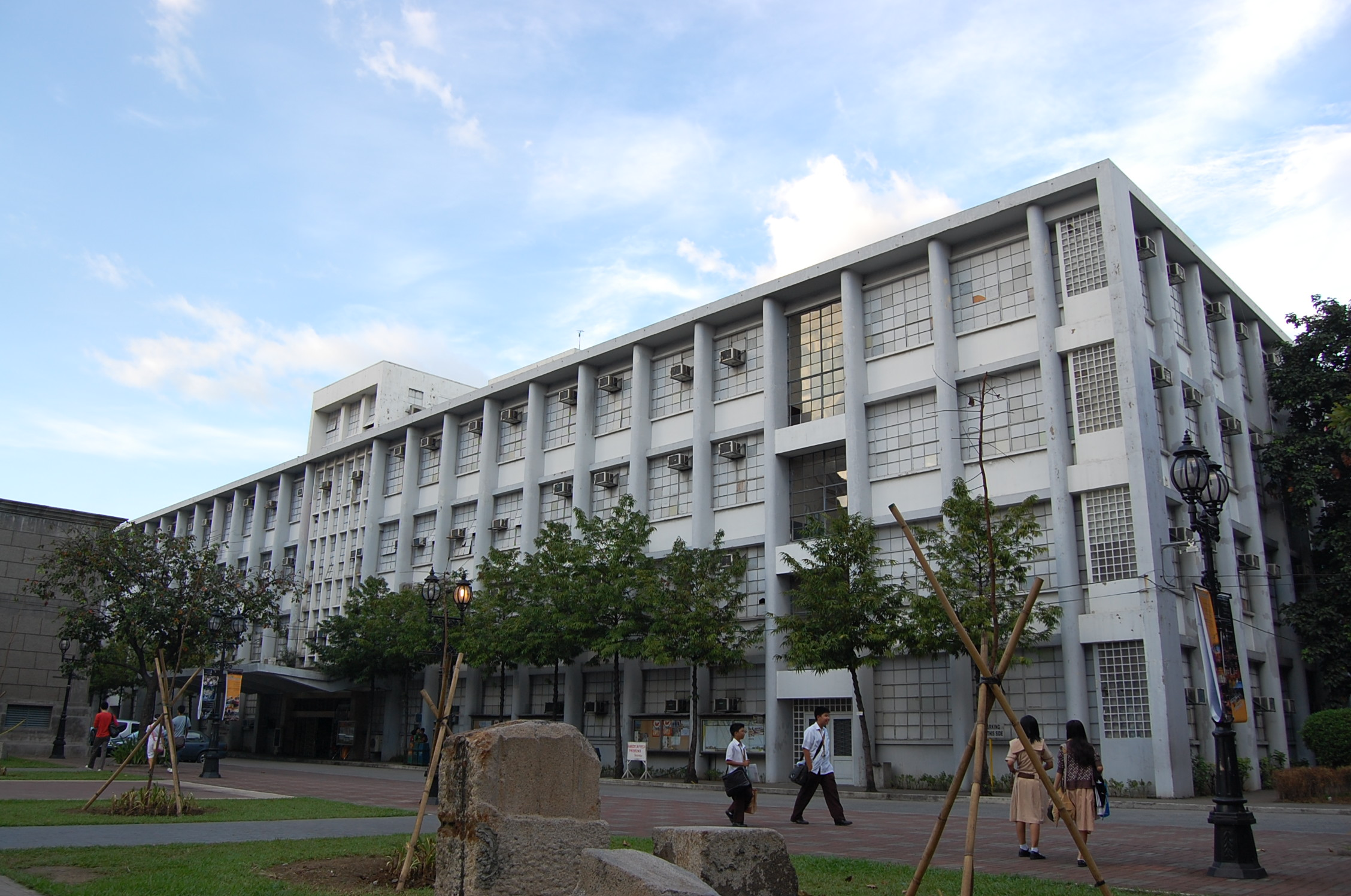
St. Raymund de Peñafort Building, which houses both the College of Commerce and the Faculty of Arts and Letters.

- B.S.B.A major in Business Economics
- B.S.B.A major in Financial Management
- B.S.B.A major in Human Resource Management
- B.S.B.A major in Marketing Management
- B.S. Entrepreneurship

== Notable alumni ==
- Stanley Co – B.S. Economics 1998, president and CEO of Robinsons Retail beginning in 2025.
- Washington SyCip – co-founder of accounting firm SGV & Co.
- Alfredo Velayo – co-founder of accounting firm SGV & Co.
- Joel Villanueva – B.S. Economics 1996, Philippine senator
