= University of Santo Tomas Main Building =

Administrative center

- Pangunahing Gusali ng Unibersidad ng Santo Tomas
- The UST Main Building in 2026

General information
- Type: Educational and office building
- Architectural style: Renaissance Revival architecture
- Location: España, Sampaloc, Manila
- Coordinates: 14°36′37″N 120°59′21″E
- Current tenants: University administrators and students
- Construction started: 1924
- Completed: July 2, 1927
- Inaugurated: November 12, 1927
- Cost: ₱1.5 million
- Owner: University of Santo Tomas

Height
- Height: 51.5 m (169 ft)

Dimensions
- Other dimensions: 86 m x 74 m

Technical details
- Structural system: Seismic isolation system
- Floor count: four

Design and construction
- Structural engineer: Rev. Fr. Roque Ruaño, O.P.
- Main contractor: American Society for Testing and Materials and Portland Cement Association

National Cultural Treasures
- Official name: The Main Building, Central Seminary, Arch of the Centuries and Open Spaces at the University of Santo Tomas, Manila
- Designated: January 25, 2010; 16 years ago
- Reference no.: 1–2010

The Main Building of the University of Santo Tomas (UST) in Manila, Philippines functions as the university's administrative center, and home of the Faculty of Civil Law, Faculty of Pharmacy, and the College of Science. The Main Building is also the home of the Museum of Arts and Sciences.

== Building ==
The building, designed by Fr. Roque Ruaño, O.P., is the first earthquake-resistant building in the Philippines. Ruaño was influenced by Frank Lloyd Wright's Imperial Hotel, Tokyo.

=== Design and structure ===
The 40 separate structures of the Main Building

In 1920, Roque Ruaño was assigned to draw up plans for the UST Main Building to be constructed at the Sulucan property of the Dominican Order. During the years 1922 and 1923, the plans were finally completed. However, some fine tunings may have been made on the design criteria as a result of the new lessons learned from the Great Kantō earthquake of September 1, 1923, which flattened Tokyo and Yokohama. Eventually, construction began in 1924.

The structure is a rectangular building having a dimension of 86 meters long and 74 meters wide with two interior courtyards or patios. The most significant feature is the fact that it is actually made up of 40 separate structures independent from one another with the only opportunity provided by pre-cast stab flooring. But some locations of the separations are now difficult to determine exactly because of the numerous cosmetic changes the interior of the building which has undergone over the years. According to an article written by the former dean of Faculty of Engineering, Manuel Mañosa, this is how it is divided:

- four corner units
- two midsection units (rear and front entrance)
- one tower (including two elevator cores)
- one entrance canopy
- a total of 26 units
  - seven units for P. Noval side
  - seven units for Gov. Forbes (now Arsenio H. Lacson) side
  - six units for Dapitan side
  - six units for España side
- four middle section (or paraninfo)
- two stair section adjacent to tower and elevator core

=== Statues ===
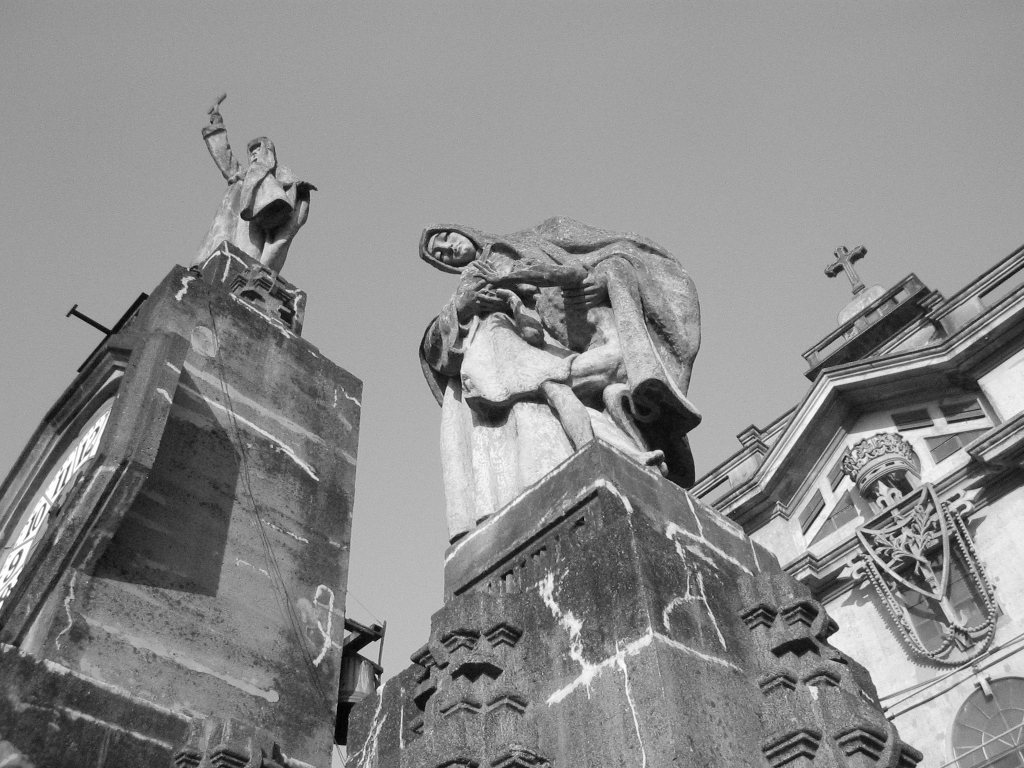
Sculptures that adorn the rooftop of UST Main Building

Standing on the pedestals of the fourth floor of the building are statues symbolizing the spiritual and intellectual aspiration of the university. Designed by the Italian Francesco Monti, faculty member of the College of Architecture, they were installed between 1949 and 1953.

- Surrounding the clock, the so-called "Tria Haec" are three statues representing, from left to right:
  - Hope (Spe)
  - Faith (Fides) (on top of the clock)
  - Love (Caritas)
- To the right of the Tria Haec are theologians and historians:
  - Saint Augustine
  - Raymond of Peñafort, O.P.
  - Vincent of Beauvais, O.P
- To the right of the theologians and historians, facing Padre Noval Street are the tragedians:
  - Pedro Calderón de la Barca
  - Sophocles
  - William Shakespeare
- To the left of the Tria Haec are the philosophers:
  - Aristotle
  - Saint Albert the Great
  - Plato
- To the left of the philosophers and facing Arsenio Lacson Avenue are the playwrights:
  - Lope de Vega
  - Aristophanes
  - Molière

== History ==
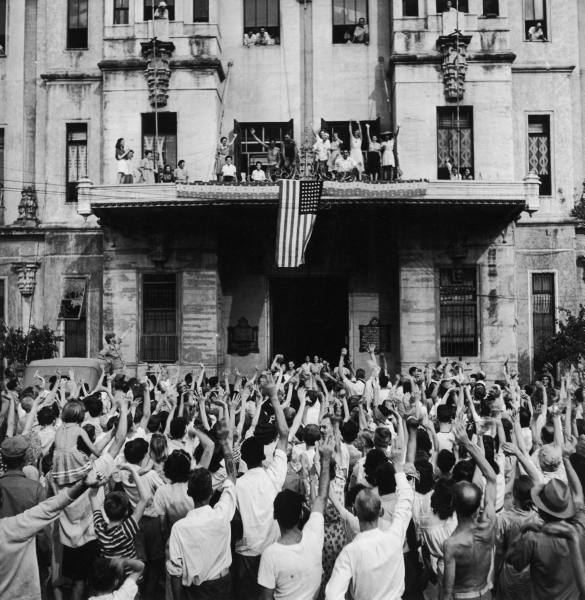
Liberation of UST from the Japanese during World War II

Construction began on 1924 and first classes were held on July 2, 1927. The faculties of Philosophy and Letters, Liberal Arts (they would later merge under the Philosophy and Letters name, later to be renamed as the Faculty of Arts and Letters), Faculties of Medicine and Pharmacy, Faculty of Engineering, and the College of Education were the first occupants who transferred to the new building. Since then, the Main Building has been the focal point of the campus. It is where all succeeding structures revolved.

After the invasion and occupation of the Philippines by the Japanese during World War II, the Japanese converted the university into the Santo Tomas Internment Camp for Americans and other non-Filipinos starting on January 4, 1942. Three floors of the building were occupied by the internees. Several internees were located in the Education Building (now housing the University of Santo Tomas Hospital) and other buildings.

On February 3, 1945, during the Battle for Manila the university was liberated by the 1st Cavalry Division, tanks from the 44th Tank Battalion and Filipino guerrillas. On February 4, Japanese commander Toshio Hayashi took some of the internees hostage in the nearby Education Building and negotiated for the Japanese soldiers to rejoin Japanese forces in the south of the city in exchange for the internees. A plaque dedicated in 1954 commemorates the event.

After the war, UST resumed operation, holding classes in the building. The university and the building was visited by Pope Paul VI in 1970 and Pope John Paul II in 1995 when UST hosted World Youth Day 1995. In 2015, Pope Francis became the third pope to visit the university, but did not enter the building.

Aside from Popes, several notable international figures have visited the building. In 2012, Queen Sofía of Spain visited the building.

== Gallery ==
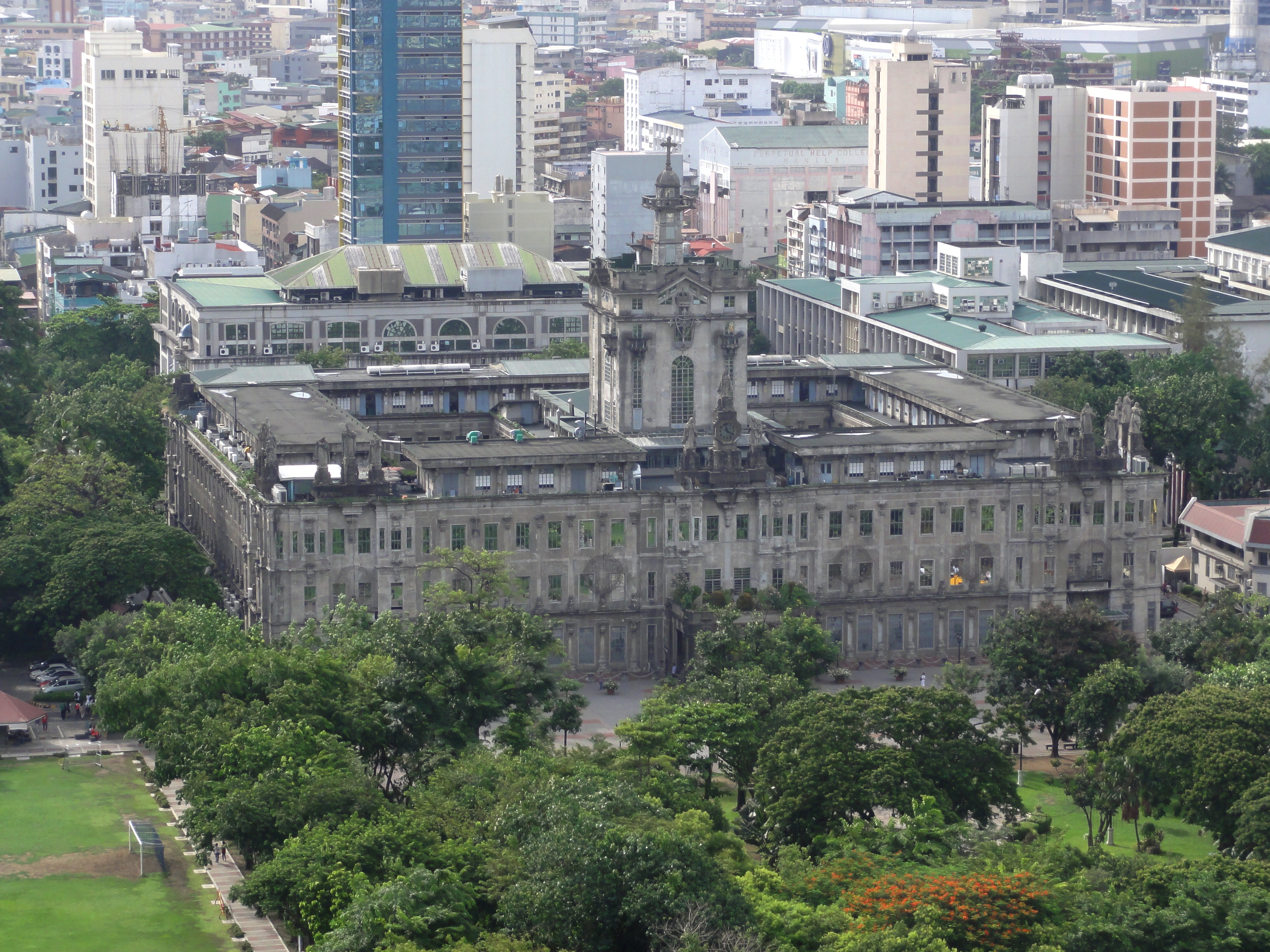
A top view of the building

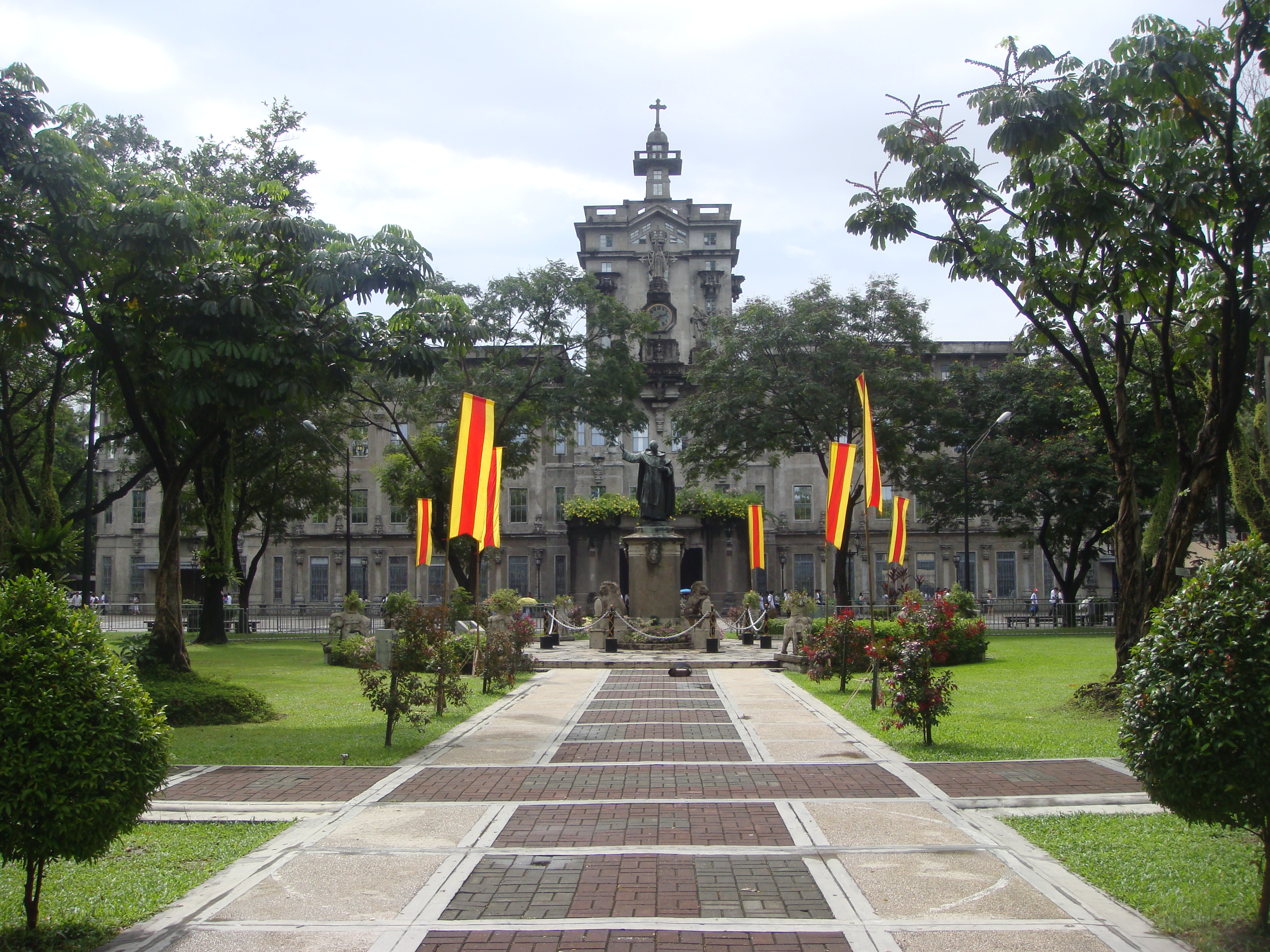
View from the Plaza Benavides

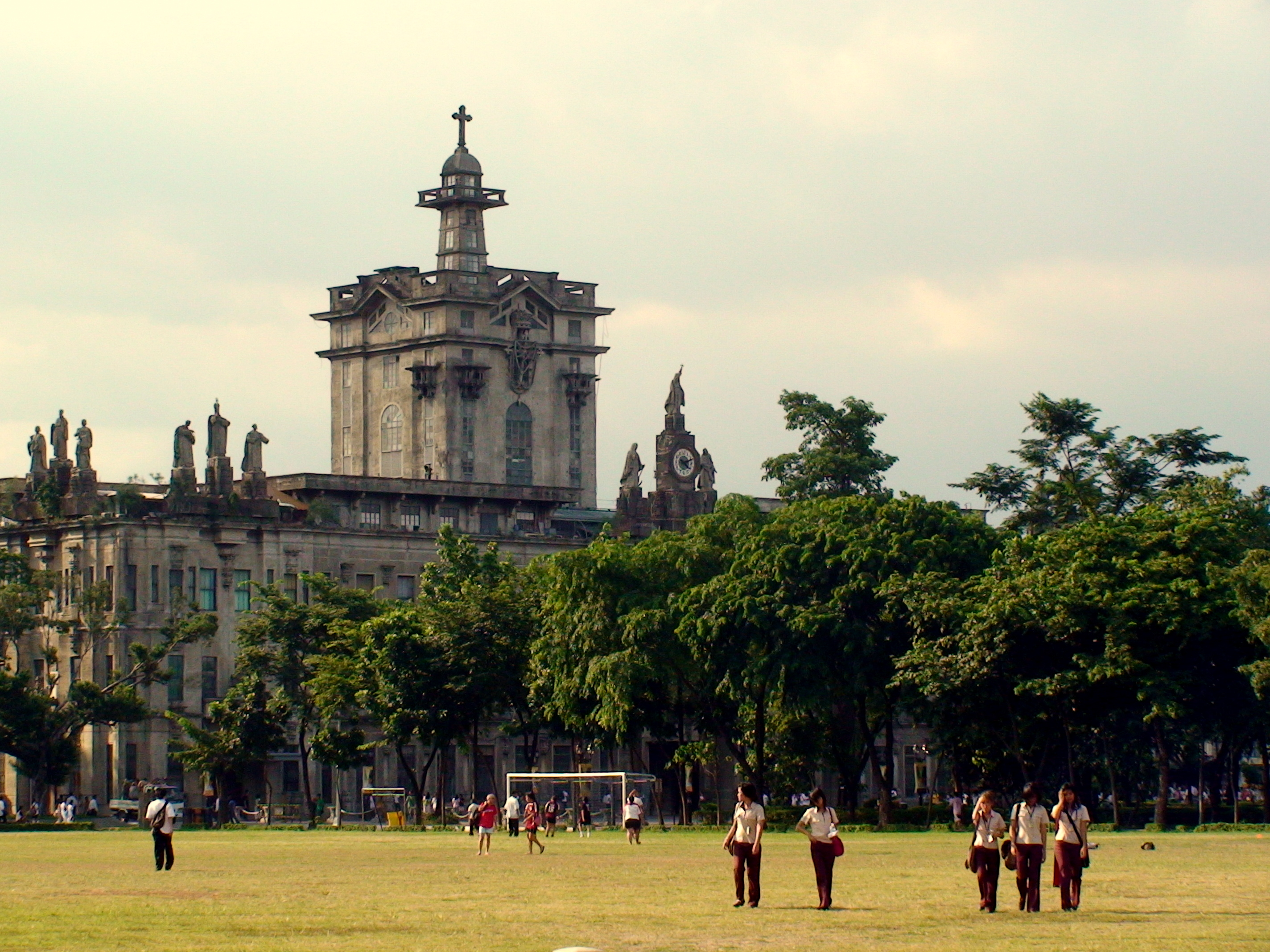
The building as viewed from the field

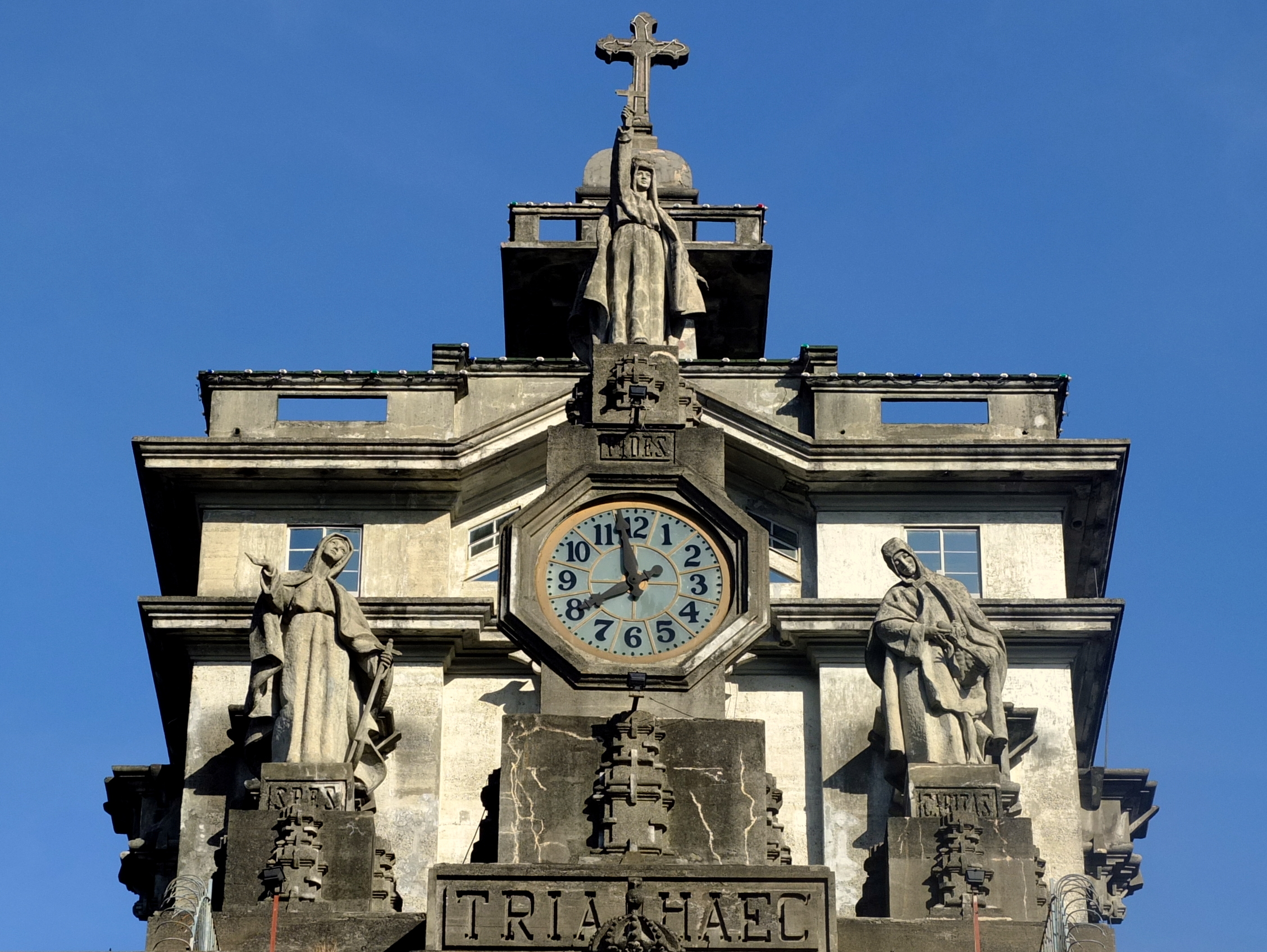
UST Tria Haec

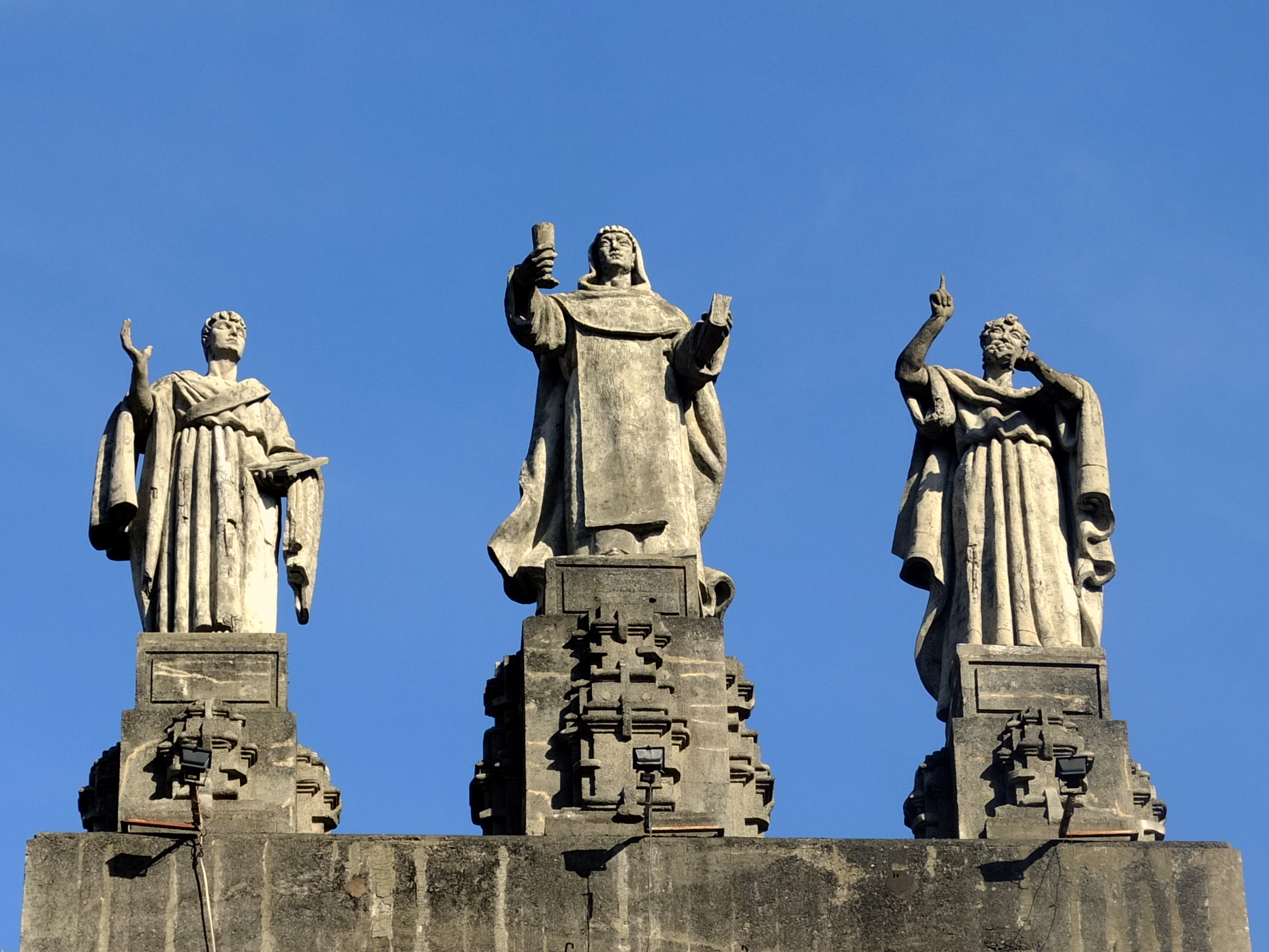
UST Monti Sculptures 2

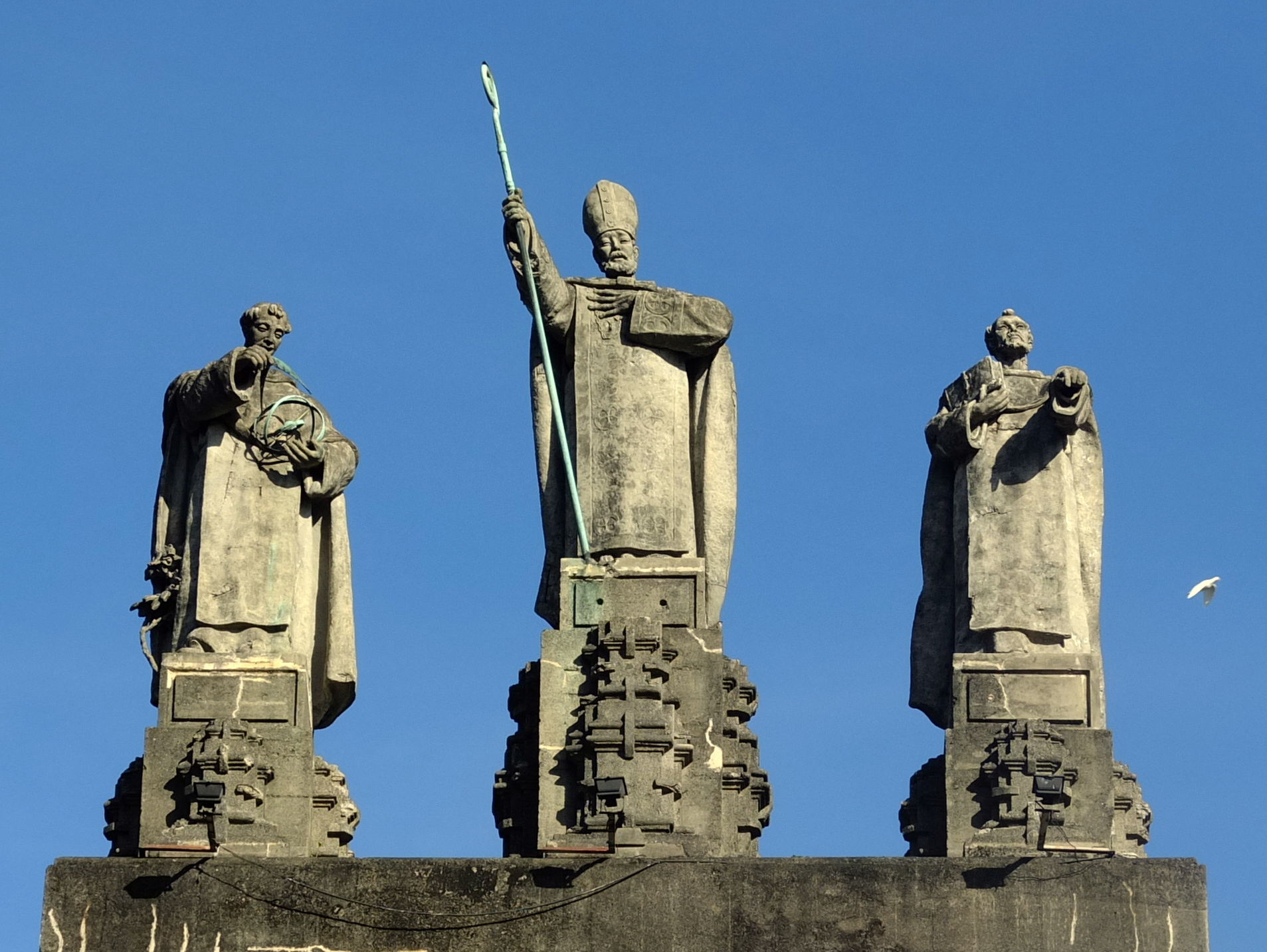
UST Monti Sculptures

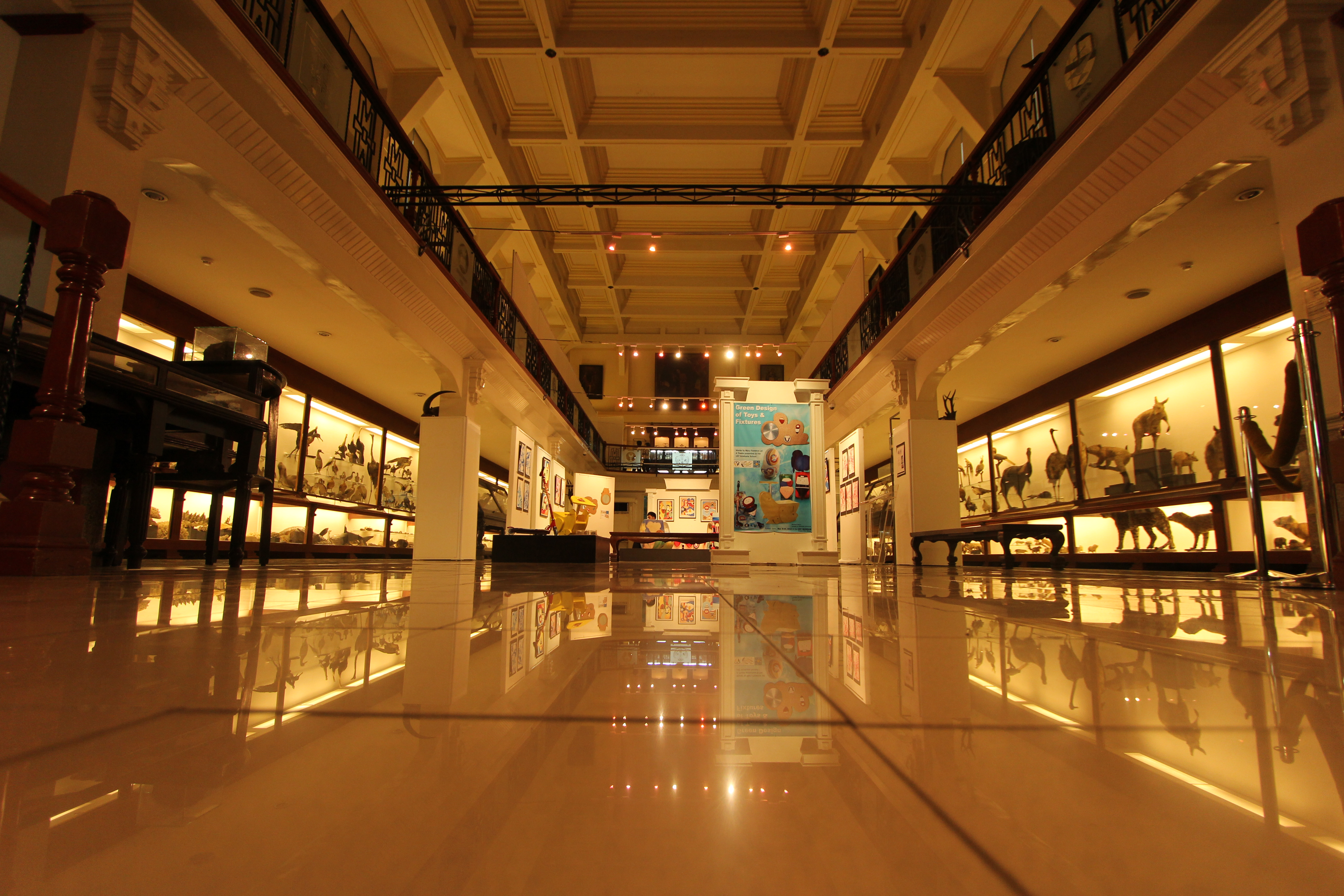
UST Museum of Arts and Sciences

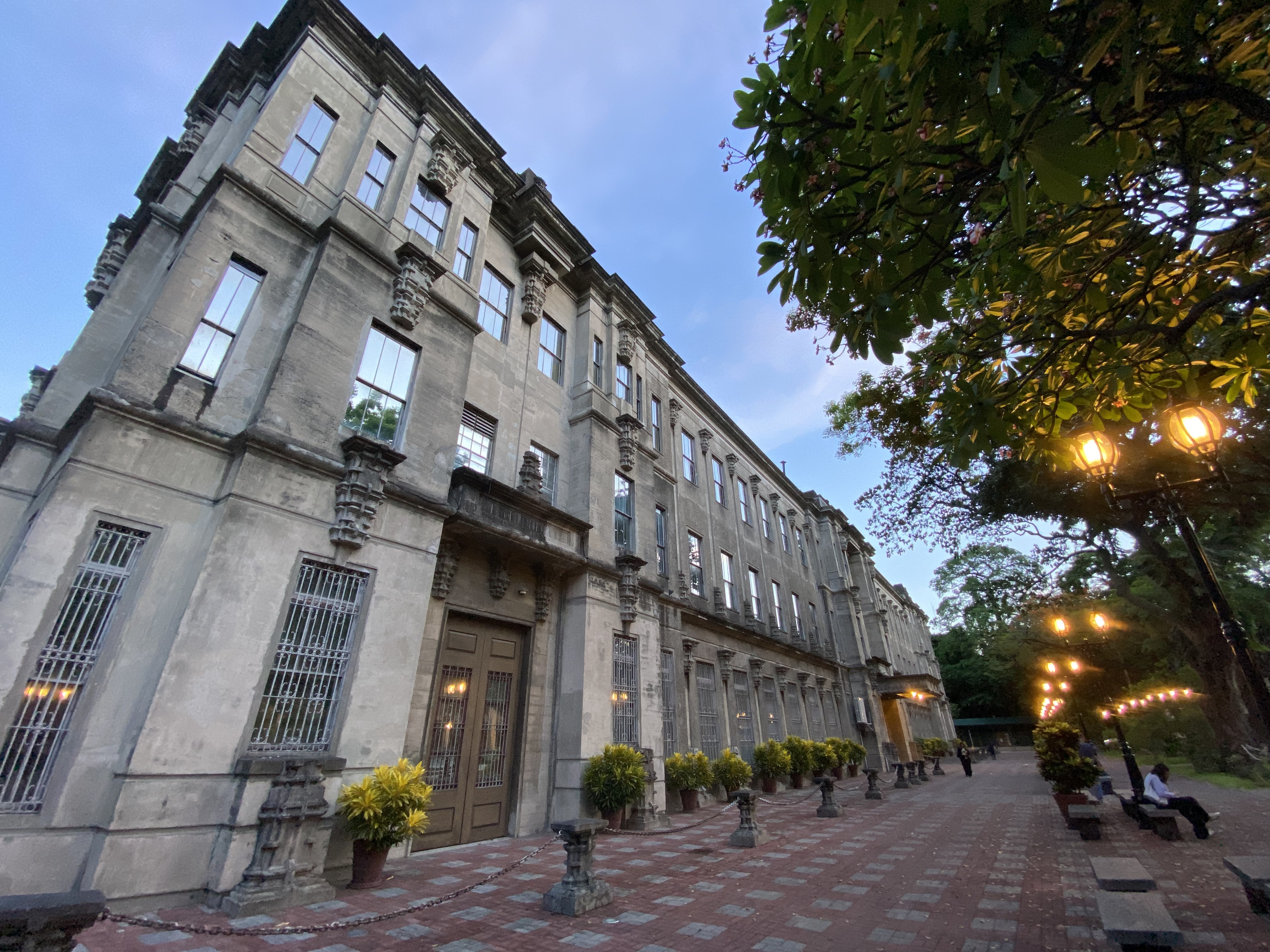
View from the Dapitan side next to the Quadricentennial Square

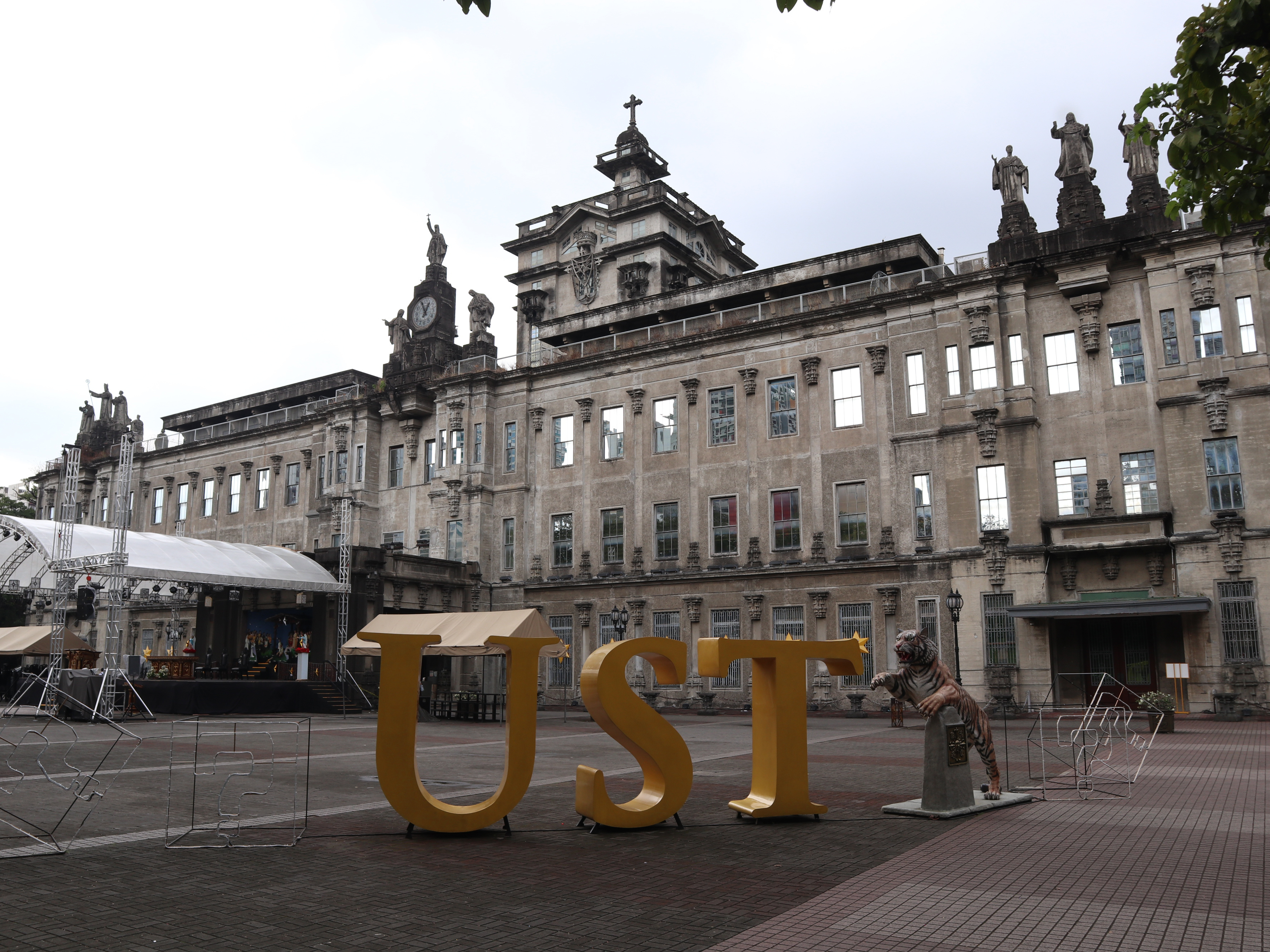
The building with the university's block letters and Bengal tiger statue

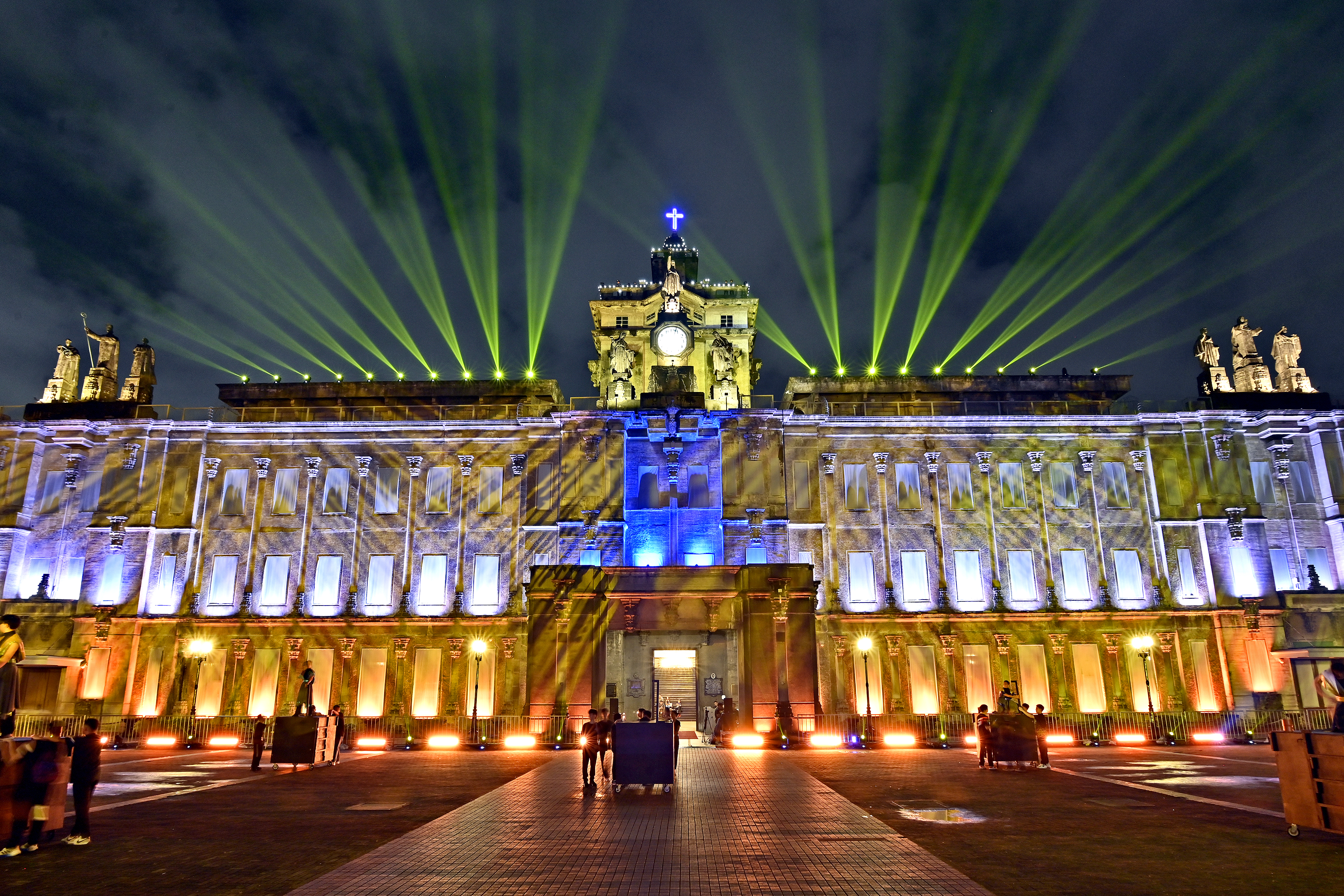
The building when it was lit up for the opening ceremony of UAAP Season 88

== See also ==
- List of University of Santo Tomas buildings
