= UST Christmas Concert =

Annual musical event

- Orchestra: UST Conservatory of Music and UST Symphony Orchestra
- Venue: Santisimo Rosario Parish Church
- Date: First week of December

Concert chronology
- December 4–5, 2013; December 3–4, 2014; To be determined

The UST Christmas Concert is an annual musical event of the University of Santo Tomas in Manila, Philippines.

== Event ==
List of Christmas Concert titles
Date	Title	Ref.
December 12, 2003	Hark the Herald, Thomasians Singing: A Christmas Concert	
December 10, 2004	Himig Pasko sa UST, A Christmas Concert: Gift of the Thomasians	
December 7, 2005	Yuletide Tunes	
December 7, 2006	A Christmas Prayer	
December 7, 2007	A Symphony of Carols	
December 3–4, 2008	A Christmas Heritage	
December 2–3, 2009		
December 1–2, 2010	A Gift to the World	
November 30, 2011 and December 1, 2011	The Quadricentennial Edition	
December 5–6, 2012		
December 4–5, 2013		
December 3–4, 2014		
December 2-3, 2015		
December 1, 2016		
December 1, 2017	The Community in Songs for the Season of Light	
