= Traditions of the University of Santo Tomas =

Traditions of the university

Coordinates: 14°36′35.5″N 120°59′21.5″E

The University of Santo Tomas in Manila, Philippines marks a variety of traditions largely influenced by the Spanish and Filipino Dominican culture. Many are annual events, such as religious assemblies marking the start and end of the academic year, a welcome walk for new students, as well as intercollege sport competitions and talent exhibitions. Christmas is celebrated in a month-long festivities culminated by the UST Paskuhan. Many Roman Catholic feast days are also celebrated.

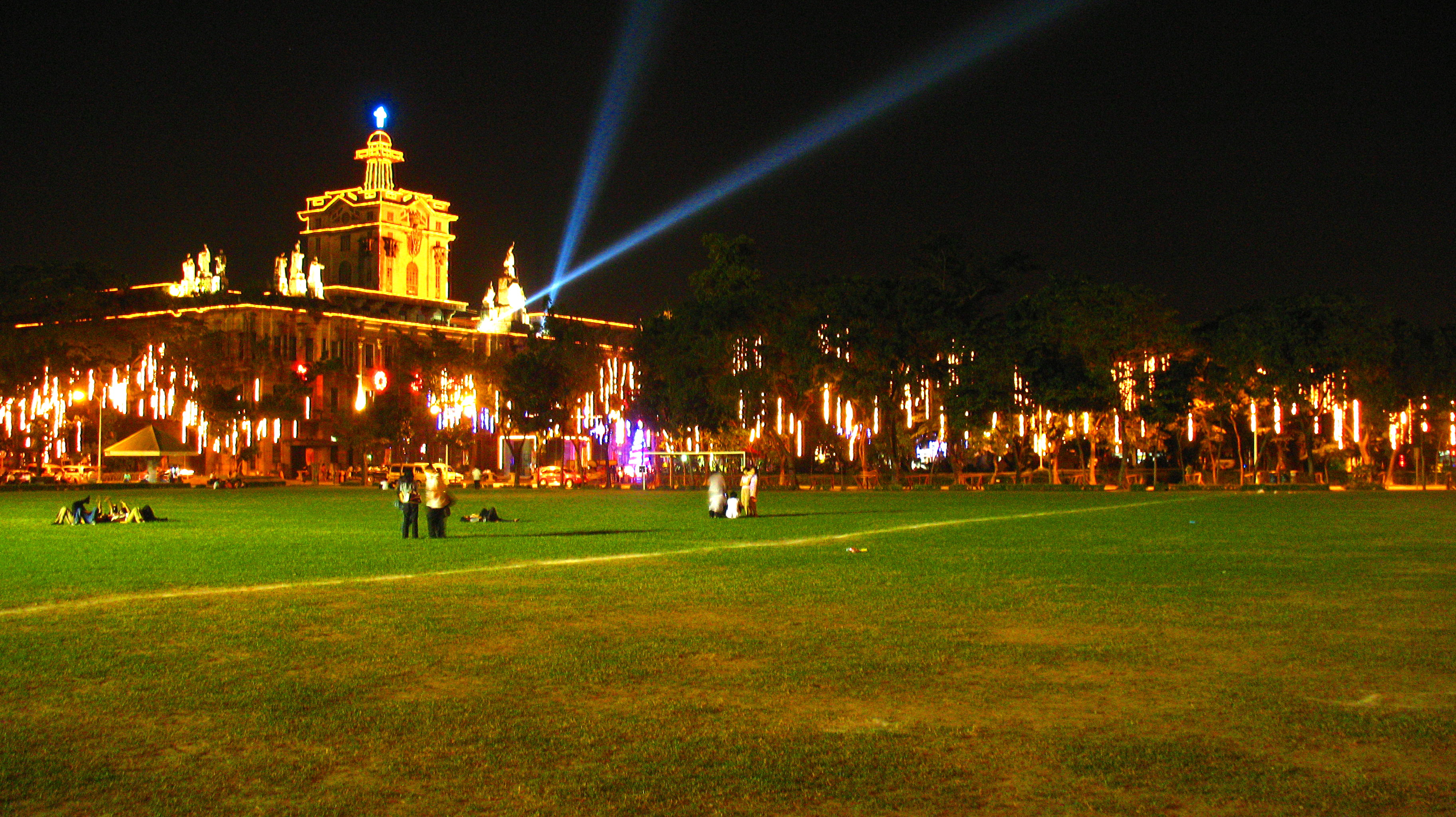
UST Main Building during Christmas Season

== Catholic traditions ==
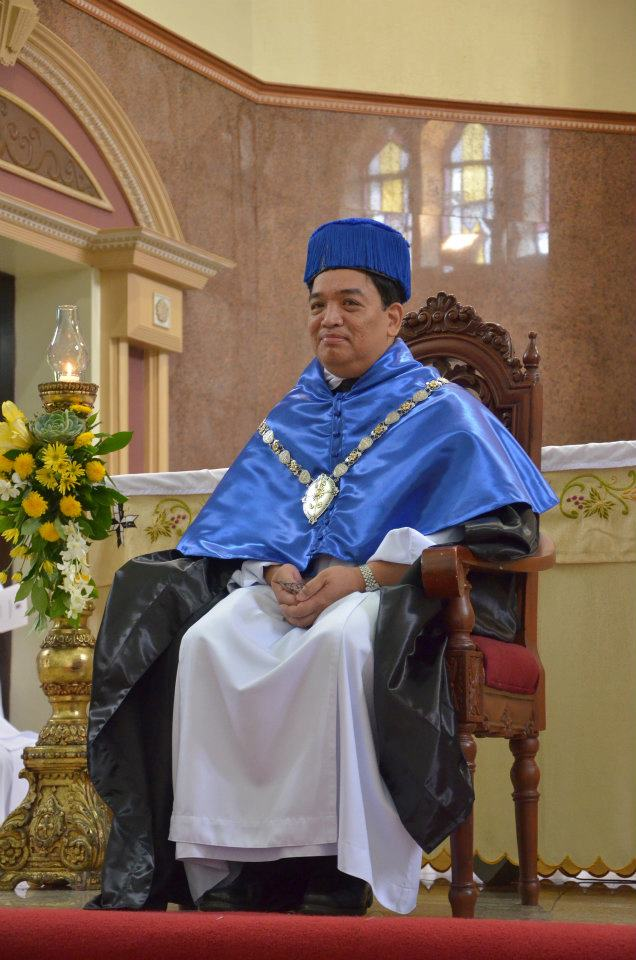
Herminio Dagohoy's installation as the 96th Rector Magnificus at the 2012 Misa de Apertura

=== Misa de Apertura ===
As a catholic university, UST opens each school year with the Mass of the Holy Spirit called as Misa de Apertura. The mass is usually officiated by a bishop, concelebrated by the Prior Provincial of the Dominican Province of the Philippines, the Rector of the university, and priests of the Priory of St. Thomas Aquinas, and clergy studying or teaching in the university. The Mass is held at Santisimo Rosario Parish, and is participated by all faculty members (donning their academic dress) and university officials, and selected student representatives. The opening of the school year is formally declared by the Apostolic Nuncio or his delegate, in consonance with the status of UST as a pontifical university.

The following is a short and incomplete list of bishops and priests who presided over the University's Misa de Apertura:

Bishops/Priests who served as Main Celebrant of the Misa de Apertura
Academic Year	Bishop/Priest	Position at the time of the Celebration	Current Position	Ref.
2009–2010	Very Rev. Fr. Quirico T. Pedregosa Jr., OP	Prior Provincial of the Dominican Province of the Philippines Vice Chancellor of the University	Acting Regent, College of Science	
2010–2011	Most Rev. Edward Joseph Adams	Apostolic Nuncio to the Philippines	Retired	
2011–2012	Very Rev. Fr. Quirico T. Pedregosa Jr. OP	Prior Provincial of the Dominican Province of the Philippines Vice Chancellor of the University	Acting Regent, College of Science	
2012–2013	Most Rev. Giuseppe Pinto	Apostolic Nuncio to the Philippines	Retired	
2013–2014	Most Rev. José S. Palma	Archbishop of Cebu President of the Catholic Bishops' Conference of the Philippines	Arcbishop-Emeritus of Cebu	
2014–2015	Most Rev. Francisco M. de Leon	Auxiliary Bishop of Antipolo	Bishop Emeritus of Antipolo	
2015–2016	Most Rev. Socrates B. Villegas	Archbishop of Lingayen–Dagupan President of the Catholic Bishops' Conference of the Philippines	Archbishop of Lingayen-Dagupan	
2016–2017	Rev. Fr. Filemon I. Dela Cruz, Jr. OP	Vice Rector for Religious Affairs of the University of Santo Tomas	Prior Provincial of the Dominican Province of the Philippines Vice Chancellor of the University	
2017–2018	Most Rev. Roberto Mallari	Diocese of San Jose (Nueva Ecija)	Bishop of Tarlac	
2018–2019	Most Rev. Gabriele Giordano Caccia	Apostolic Nuncio to the Philippines	Apostolic Nuncio to the United States of America	
2019–2020	Most Rev. Rex Andrew Alarcon	Bishop of Daet	Archbishop of Cáceres	
2020–2021	Very Rev. Fr. Napoleon B. Sipalay Jr. OP	Prior Provincial of the Dominican Province of the Philippines Vice Chancellor of the University	Bishop of Alaminos	
2021–2022	Very Rev. Fr. Richard G. Ang, OP, PhD	Rector Magnificus of the University of Santo Tomas	Rector Magnificus of the University of Santo Tomas	
2022–2023	Most Rev. Mylo Hubert C. Vergara	Bishop of Pasig Vice President of the Catholic Bishops' Conference of the Philippines	Bishop of Pasig	
2023–2024	Most Rev. Cerilo Alan U. Casicas	Bishop of Marbel	Bishop of Marbel	
2024–2025	Most Rev. Napoleon B. Sipalay Jr., OP	Bishop of Alaminos	Bishop of Alaminos	
2025–2026	Most Rev. Marcelino Antonio M. Maralit Jr.	Bishop of San Pablo	Bishop of San Pablo	
2026-2027	Cardinal Pablo Virgilio S. David	Bishop of Kalookan	Bishop of Kalookan	

=== Feasts ===
The University observes liturgical celebrations celebrated on the general calendar, such as:

- Solemnity of the Immaculate Conception on December 8, celebrated as a national and university-wide holiday. A University Vigil Mass is often celebrated in the afternoon of December 7.
- The Simbang Gabi Masses take place at the Plaza Mayor (dawn Masses of December 16–24) and at the Santisimo Rosario Parish (evening of December 15–23)
- The Christmas Eve Mass on December 24 takes place at the Plaza Mayor, usually presided by the Prior of the Priory of St. Thomas Aquinas.
- The Vigil Mass on the Solemnity of Mary, Mother of God on December 31 takes place at the Santisimo Rosario Parish-UST, usually presided by the Rector Magnificus of the University of Santo Tomas.
- The University Mass on Ash Wednesday, marking the beginning of the Season of Lent takes place at the Plaza Mayor at 5:00 pm, preceded by confessions at the Benavides Park.
- During the Paschal Triduum, the Mass of the Lord's Supper takes place at the Plaza Mayor, culminating with the Vigil at the Altar of repose at the Parish Church. The Celebration of the Lord's Passion on Good Friday and the Easter Vigil take place inside the Parish Church. These services are presided by the University Rector, the Prior of the Priory, and the Parish Priest.

A number of liturgical feast days are proper to the University of Santo Tomas, such as:

- Saint Thomas Aquinas, titular patron of the University, celebrated as a Solemnity on January 28, a University holiday. A triduum is celebrated from January 24–26, with the University Mass being held on January 27.
- Saint Dominic, founder of the Order of Preachers, celebrated as a Solemnity by the whole religious congregation on August 8, which is also a holiday in the University. A triduum is celebrated from August 4–6, with the University Mass celebrated on August 7.
- Our Lady of the Rosary, celebrated by the Santisimo Rosario Parish, located within the University Campus on the first Sunday of October. The celebration begins with the entronement rites on the day before the first Novena day. Colleges, Departments, and Offices, take turns in sponsoring the Novena Prayer and Masses.
- Mass for deceased members of the Thomasian Family, celebrated on the month of November
- Blessed Buenaventura García de Paredes and the Thomasian Martyrs, celebrated on November 6

=== Christmas celebration ===
The university starts the Christmas festivities with opening of the campus lights and the UST Christmas Concert. The UST Christmas Concert features talents from the UST Conservatory of Music, UST Singers, Coro Tomasino, Liturgikon, Conservatory Chorus Class, and the UST Symphony Orchestra. Traditional Filipino and foreign Christmas classics are performed in the event. At the end of every concert, the UST Symphony Orchestra and performers lead the audience in singing some songs such as "Ang Pasko ay Sumapit."

The Christmas Concert Gala began in 2003 when the UST secretary-general Fr. Isidro Abaño, O.P., envisioned a musical concert that would bring together world-class Thomasian talents who would perform for UST students, faculty, alumni, friends, and benefactors. Initially, the concert helped raise funds for the various projects of the university, such as scholarship grants of the students of the UST Conservatory of Music, but since 2008, it has also contributed in UST's heritage-conservation efforts. Maricris Zobel, socialite and an art patroness, has been the co-chair of the organizing committee since then. Proceeds of the Christmas Gala has been allotted for the victims of typhoons Ondoy and Pepeng in 2009, restoration of various paintings, and construction of the UST Museum of Arts and Sciences Hall of Visual Arts in 2011.

Various organizations like the Belo Medical Group, the San Miguel Corporation, the Enrique Zobel group of companies, and the Singapore Airlines have become presenters of the event. In 2010, the Philippine Department of Foreign Affairs hosted the opening of the concert and the Lumina Pandit, an exhibit for the quadricentennial festivities.

At the ninth Christmas Concert Gala on December 1, 2011, the newly installed Martyr's Carillon at the façade of the Santisimo Rosario Parish was rung by the Professor Raul Suñico, Dean of the UST Conservatory of Music.

==== Paskuhan ====
Primered by the Eucharistic Celebration, the Paskuhan is the Thomasian way of celebrating Christmas. It is one of the most awaited events of the year, showcasing different performances from different student organizations, and live bands, which is complemented with a show of pyrotechny.

In the 2011 celebration, the crowd was estimated at 100,000.

=== University Retreat ===
The University, through the Office of the Vice Rector for Religious Affairs, conducts a three-day university wide retreat for its academic and administrative officials, support staff, faculty members, and students. University administrators and academic officials, faculty members, and support staff attend the retreat in-person, while students are to follow the retreat through secured livestreaming platforms.

The tradition of the University-wide Retreat began in 2010, in preparation for the UST Quadricentennial Celebration, on November 3–5, 2010, held at the SMX Convention Center Manila. Succeeding retreats have been held at the Quadricentennial Pavilion, except in 2022, when, due to the COVID-19 pandemic in the Philippines, the retreat was held in Santisimo Rosario Parish, while being livestreamed in social media platforms, and participants were distributed in other University buildings.

Cardinals, bishops and priests, both from within and outside the Dominican Order, are invited to either preach a session, or celebrate the Eucharist during these days.

=== Baccalaureate Mass ===
The Baccalaureate Mass for the graduating students is led by the Rector of the university. The mass is followed by the Ceremony of the Light and the Sending-off Rites. The Sending-off Rites is a processional march from the UST Grandstand to the back of the Arch of the Centuries.

The Mass takes place in the UST Grandstand traditionally. In 2016 and 2025, however, the university decided to hold it in the Quadricentennial Pavilion because of the inclement weather. In 2020 and 2021, due to the COVID-19 Pandemic, the Baccalaureate Mass was livestreamed from the Santisimo Rosario Parish. In 2022, the in-person Baccalaureate Mass returned and was celebrated over a period of two days for batches 2022 (June 3, 2022), 2021 and 2020 (June 4, 2022) .

In the 2026 Baccalaureate Mass, as a precautionary measure, the Eucharistic Celebration took place inside the Quadricentennial Pavilion (in two batches: one in the morning, and one in the afternoon), while the rest of the program (including the imposition of the Mission Cross, fireworks display, and exit to the Arch of the Centuries) took place at the University Grandstand and open spaces later in the evening.

== School spirit ==
University of Santo Tomas Hymn (in full version)

Seat of Aquinas, majestic enduring
the storms of the ages.
Shrine of our ancient fathers,
Carved in these isles domain.

This is the castle imperious.
This is the home of our sages.
Blessed by the Cross of the angels,
Gift of our Mother Spain!

Deep in her echoing chambers
Flames of eternal yearning
Cast their benignant shadows
athwart this beloved land.

Keeping the torches of freedom
and heaven forever burning.
Deep in the heart led by the Saviour's command.

Chorus

God of all nations
Merciful Lord of our restless being,
Sweep with your golden lilies;
This fountain of purest light;
Trace with the sails of the galleons
the dream beyond our seeing
Touch with the flame of your kindness
the gloom of our darkest night.
Keep us in beauty and truth and virtues
impassioned embrace
Ever your valiant legions
Imbued with unending grace!

=== Alma mater ===
The UST Hymn is the alma mater song of the University of Santo Tomas. The lyrics were written by Dr. Jose Ma. Hernandez to music composed by the UST Conservatory of Music's first director, Dean Julio Esteban Anguita, and orchestrated by Manuel P. Maramba, O.S.B. Today, only the chorus of the original hymn is being sung and being played.

=== Discurso de Apertura ===
The Discurso de Apertura or the inaugural lecture consists of a scientific discussion delivered by a professor or dean at the formal opening of the school year. The lecturer assigned in the preparation of the academic paper is appointed by the rector of the university a few months prior to the opening of each school year.

The Discurso traces its roots back to Lectio Prima, or first lecture. It was a conference practiced by the Dominican houses of studies to start the school year based on the UST statutes drafted by the Dominican priest Juan Amador in 1785. The first Discurso was held on July 16, 1866, as an annual event. It was temporarily discontinued in 1929 when Don Nicanor Cortez failed to write his dissertation. Twelve years after, the tradition was brought back with Fr. Angel de Blas, a psychologist, as the speaker. It was again discontinued in 1942 at the break out of World War II, and resumed later on in 1946.

In 2011, professor Regalado Trota-Jose, archivist of the university, presented documents from the archives regarding the life of the national hero José Rizal in UST.

Replacing the lecture of Discurso de Apertura in 2012 and 2016 were the inaugural addresses of Herminio V. Dagohoy as the ninety-sixth rector (first and second terms) of the university. The Discurso was omitted in 2020 due to the COVID-19 pandemic.

Discurso de Apertura in recent years
Year	Lecturer	Topic	Ref.
2000	Amado Dimayuga, Dean, Faculty of Civil Law	Judicial Bar Council and the importance of refining the process of appointing court judges	
2001	Luis Ferrer, Dean, College of Architecture	Focus on building "humane communities"	
2002	Jaime de los Santos, Assistant Dean, UST College of Fine Arts and Design	Creative instinct	
2003	Raul Sunico, Dean, Conservatory of Music	"Music: Raising the Level of Listening Appreciation"	
2004	Rolando Lopez, M.D. Dean, Faculty of Medicine and Surgery	Value of spirituality on students	
2005	Jeanette Loanzon, Dean, College of Commerce and Business Administration	Economic revolution	
2006	Glenda Vargas, Dean, UST College of Nursing	Exodus of Filipino nurses	
2007	Jose Ireneo, Dean, UST AMV College of Accountancy	Governance and internal controls in businesses	
2008	Rev. Fr. Rolando de la Rosa, O.P., Rector Magnificus of the University of Santo Tomas	Inaugural Address	
2009	John Joseph T. Fernandez, Dean, College of Architecture	"Heritage Conservation in the University of Santo Tomas"	
2010	Nilo Divina, Dean, Faculty of Civil Law	"Constantly Striving for Excellence"	
2011	Regalado Trota Jose, Archivist, Archivo de la Universidad de Santo Tomas	"Facebook Flashback: The Archives and the Story of the University"	
2012	Rev. Fr. Herminio V. Dagohoy, O.P., Rector Magnificus of the University of Santo Tomas	Inaugural Address	
2013	Allan de Guzman, Ph.D. Faculty, College of Education	Parable of Talents: The University of Santo Tomas at the Crossroad of History and Creativity	
2014	Philipina Marcelo, Ph.D. Dean, Faculty of Engineering	Convergence: Innovations in Food Engineering and Engineering Education, and the Engineering of our Restless Being	
2015	Cheryl Peralta, DrPH; Dean, UST College of Rehabilitation Sciences	Public Health	
2016	Rev. Fr. Herminio V. Dagohoy, O.P., Rector, University of Santo Tomas	Inaugural Address	
2017	Pilar I. Romero, Ph.D. Principal, Senior High School	Finding New Roads, Traversing New Paths	
2018	Michael Anthony Vasco, Ph.D. Dean, Faculty of Arts and Letters	"Liberal Arts in the University : Human Sciences as 'Erlibnis' and 'Weltanschauung'"	
2019	Ma. Minerva Calimag, M.D., MSc, Ph.D. Professor, Faculty of Medicine and Surgery	"Research and the Social Agenda: The Tale of Two Rivers"	
2021	Lourdes D. Maglinao, M.D., MHPEd; Dean, Faculty of Medicine and Surgery	"Leading Change in a 150-Year Old Medical School: Overcoming the Challenges of a VUCA World Amidst the 21st Century Pandemic"	
2022	Clarita D. Carillo, Ph.D. Assistant to the Rector for Planning and Quality Management, University of Santo Tomas	"Quality Assurance and the 3C's of Resiliency"	
2023	Maribel G. Nonato, Ph.D. Assistant to the Rector; UST General Santos	"The Framework of CARE"	
2024	Melanie D. Turingan-Marcos, Ph.D. Dean; Faculty of Arts and Letters	“Imbued with Unending Grace: A History and Legacy of the University of Santo Tomas”	
2025	Patricia M. Empleo, Ph.D. Dean, College of Accountancy	"Internal Control: Key to Effective Enterprise Management"	
2026	Alfredo P. Co, PhD Professor Emeritus, Faculty of Arts and Letters	"Indigenous Filipino Philosophy: from Excavation to Void to Presencing"	

=== Thomasian Welcome Walk ===
The Thomasian Welcome Walk (TWW) is an annual university event that uniquely welcomes new students to the university. Freshmen from all the colleges, including the high school, pass under historic Arch of the Centuries from the España Boulevard side and walk towards the UST Main Building. It symbolizes the linkage between incoming freshmen and their predecessors in the university. The first Walk took place on June 14, 2002, known before as "The Rites of Passage".

==== Eucharistic Celebration ====
The Mass following the Welcome Walk used to take place in the UST Grandstand. However, starting 2012, since the beginning of the school year (August) takes place during the rainy season, the program and Mass take place inside the Quadricentennial Pavilion in separate batches. The Mass is usually presided over by the Rector Magnificus, or on his behalf, the Vice Rectors of the University.

==== ROARientation ====
The ROARientation takes place during the Thomasian Welcome Walk. After the Eucharistic Celebration, a program takes place inside the Quadricentennial Pavilion, where freshmen Thomasians get to know the policies and services of the University. Cultural presentations also take place, such as teaching the Go USTe cheer and other UAAP Cheers used during games, as an immersion to the school spirit of the University.

The high school departments (Junior High School, Education High School, and Senior High School) are grouped together as a single batch, with the program entitled Alab.

=== Solemn Investitures/End-of-School Year Rites ===
Following the Baccalaureate Mass, each faculty/college/institute/department is scheduled to hold its Solemn Investiture (undergraduate/graduate levels), Graduation (Senior High School), and Completion Rites (Junior High School). The Office of the Secretary General is in charge of releasing a schedule of these ceremonies, with the date, venue, and the presiding official.

Most faculties/colleges conduct these rites in the Quadricentennial Pavilion, with a few exceptions, due to the small number of graduates from their respective faculty/college/school:

- The University of Santo Tomas Faculties of Ecclesiastical Studies (Philosophy, Theology, Canon Law) conduct their solemn investitures together at the Santisimo Rosario Parish, with the University Vice Chancellor presiding.
- The University of Santo Tomas Education High School and the University of Santo Tomas Conservatory of Music hold their completion/solemn investiture at the Albertus Magnus Auditorium.
- The University of Santo Tomas Faculty of Civil Law holds its solemn investiture at the Medicine Auditorium at the San Martin de Porres Building.

The solemn investitures of the undergraduate and graduate levels are presided over by the University's Executive Authorities, Top Administrative Officials, and members of the Board of Trustees; the moving up and graduation rites of the junior and senior high schools are presided over by their respective principals and regents.

== University events ==
There are various university-wide events, among others are:

- Pautakan – A quiz bee among different colleges and faculties. Established in 1977
- Thomasian Youth Ambassador and Ambassadress – The annual intercollegiate search highlights the values in the Thomasian identity of compassion, competence, and commitment organized by the UST Student Organizations Coordinating Council (UST SOCC).
- Himig Tomasino – Annual competition of the different collegiate chorale groups of the university organized by the UST Student Organizations Coordinating Council (UST SOCC).

=== The USTv Awards ===
The USTv Awards or The USTv Students’ Choice Awards is an annual awarding ceremony. It honors television programs and personalities that promote Thomasian values and the teachings of the Catholic Church. Established in 2005, the USTv Awards is the first student award- giving body in the Philippines. In 2014, 35,000 students were expected to participate in voting.

=== Fireworks ===
UST began having pyromusical shows in the opening of the Quadricentennial Celebration on January 27, 2011. It was also the first time the Philippines saw a multi-position pyromusical event when the fireworks were launched from the UST Grandstand and Santisimo Rosario Parish. In the Neo-Centennial Celebration in January 2012, the university was also the first to set up a pyromusical in four different structures and buildings. The music and choreography of all the pyromusical events are arranged by Don Miguel Villarosa and the technicals and set-up are done by John Oliver Zeng, alumni of the UST College of Fine Arts and Design. The fireworks of all the pyromusical events are provided by Dragon Fireworks, a local fireworks manufacturer.

The pyromusical display has become one of the most anticipated events during the Paskuhan festivities attracting alumni, visitors, and local media coverage.

The pyromusical display in the University was omitted during the following occasions:

- Paskuhan 2013, in solidarity with the victims of Super Typhoon Yolanda
- Paskuhan 2020 and 2021 due to the COVID-19 Pandemic
- Baccalaureate Masses in 2020, 2021, and 2022 due to the COVID-19 Pandemic

List of events with pyromusical display
Date	Event	Ref.
January 27, 2011	Quattromondial Monument unveiling Q Grand Program	
January 28, 2011	One@400: Q Grand Alumni Homecoming Dinner	
March 25, 2011	Baccalaureate Mass 2011	
December 16, 2011	Paskuhan 2011	
January 27, 2012	Neo-Centennial Celebration	
March 23, 2012	Baccalaureate Mass 2012	
December 21, 2012	Paskuhan 2012	
March 19, 2013	Baccalaureate Mass 2013	
March 21, 2014	Baccalaureate Mass 2014	
December 11, 2014	Paskuhan 2014	
May 15, 2015	Baccalaureate Mass 2015	
December 18, 2015	Paskuhan 2015	
May 20, 2016	Baccalaureate Mass 2016	
September 4, 2016	UAAP Season 79 Opening Ceremonies	
December 16, 2016	Paskuhan 2016	
May 19, 2017	Baccalaureate Mass 2017	
May 20, 2017	UAAP Season 79 Closing Ceremonies	
December 20, 2017	Paskuhan 2017	
May 24, 2018	Baccalaureate Mass 2018	
December 21, 2018	Paskuhan 2018	
May 25, 2019	Baccalaureate Mass 2019	
December 20, 2019	Paskuhan 2019	
December 19, 2022	Paskuhan 2022	
May 30, 2023	Baccalaureate Mass 2023	
December 21, 2023	Paskuhan 2023	
May 31, 2024	Baccalaureate Mass 2024	
December 20, 2024	Paskuhan 2024	
May 31, 2025	Baccalaureate Mass 2025	
September 19, 2025	UAAP Season 88 Opening Ceremonies	
December 19, 2025	Paskuhan 2025	
May 28, 2026	Baccalaureate Mass 2026	

=== UST Student Awards Day ===
The University gives distinction to individuals or groups who exemplify excellence in the fields of academics, community development, leadership, teamwork, sports, and the arts, during the UST Student Awards Day, held days before the celebration of the Baccalaureate Mass and Solemn Investitures. The awarding ceremonies take place at the Quadricentennial Pavilion.

The Rector's Award is conferred to the graduating student of each faculty/college/institute with the highest General Weighted Average (GWA). Among the awardees, the student with the highest GWA is declared the class valedictorian, and is tasked to deliver a message towards the end of the celebration.

Class Valedictorians in Recent Years
Year	Valedictorian's College/Faculty	General Weighted Average	Ref.
2006	Arts and Letters	1.17	
2007	Engineering	1.15	
2008	Science	1.092	
2009	Pharmacy	1.16	
2010	Pharmacy	1.12	
2011	Tourism and Hospitality Management	1.12	
2013	Pharmacy	1.069	
2014	Tourism and Hospitality Management	1.089	
2015	Sacred Theology		
2016	Pharmacy	1.121	
2017	Pharmacy	1.059	
2018	Tourism and Hospitality Management	1.111	
2019	Philiosophy	1.126	
2020	Sacred Theology	1.167	
2021			
2022	Pharmacy	1.031	
2023	Tourism and Hospitality Management	1.019	
2024	Physical Education and Athletics	1.050	
2025	Science	1.081	
2026	Commerce and Business Administration	1.508	

== Sports ==
UST's official mascot is the Growling Tiger. Another mascot, Quster, which stands for Quadricentennial UST Tiger, was specially made for the 400th anniversary of the university. In The Varsitarian, UST students are represented by Tomas U. Santos.

=== Thomasian Goodwill Games ===
The Thomasian Goodwill Games is a program of the UST Institute of Physical Education and Athletics (IPEA) that seeks to promote the spirit of friendship and unity between students of the different colleges of the university. Sporting events include basketball, volleyball, football, judo, swimming, beach volleyball, and table tennis. It was formally established in school year 2002–2003 by UST judo coach Alberto Arce.

Colleges also have different sporting teams other than the ones mentioned above. Some include tennis and badminton in their college's sport fests.

College championships
Academic year	Basketball		Volleyball		Football	
Academic year	Men	Women	Men	Women	Men	Women
2002–2003	–	–	–	–	–	CFAD vs. **AB** vs. Arch
2004–2005	**CBA** vs. Eng'g	Educ vs. **FMS**	–	–	–	–
2005–2006	–	–	–	–	–	–
2006–2007	–	–	–	–	CFAD	–
2007–2008	**AB** vs. Eng'g	Nurs	–	–	Arch vs. **CFAD**	–
2008–2009	–	CBA	CFAD vs. **Eng'g**	**AMV** vs. CBA	CRS vs. **GS-CL**	–
2009–2010	–	CBA	CBA	Eng'g	Arch vs. **Eng'g**	**FMS** vs. Nurs
2010–2011	Eng'g	Educ	CBA	AMV	Arch vs. **GS-CL**	FMS vs. **Nurs**
2011–2012	CTHM vs. **Eng'g**	CBA	AMV vs. **CBA**	**AMV** vs. Arch	Eccle vs. **GS-CL**	FMS vs. **Nurs**
2012–2013	**AB** vs. Eng'g	AB vs. **CBA**	**AB** vs. CBA	Arch vs. **CBA**	**Eng'g** vs. FMS	FMS
2013–2014	**CBA** vs. CTHM	CBA	**AMV** vs. Arch	Eng'g vs. **Pha**	–	**CRS** vs. FMS
2014–2015	**CBA** vs. CTHM	**CBA** vs. CRS	**AMV** vs. Arch	**AB** vs. Educ	–	–
2015–2016	**Eng'g** vs. Sci	–	–	–	–	–

Notes:

- Champion team in **boldface**.
- AB: Arts and Letters; AMV: Accountancy; Arch: Architecture; CBA: Commerce and Business Administration; CFAD: Fine Arts and Design; CRS: Rehabilitation Sciences; CTHM: Tourism and Hospitality Management; Eccle: Ecclesiastical Studies; Educ: Education; Eng'g: Engineering; FMS: Medicine and Surgery; GS: Graduate School; GS–CL: Graduate School–Civil Law; Law: Civil Law; Nurs: Nursing; Pha: Pharmacy; Sci: Science; UST-HS: UST High School

=== Dance events ===
Every year, the UST Salinggawi Dance Troupe, the official dance group of the university holds dance competitions and concerts. Cheermania, also organized by the Salinggawi since 1996, is an annual cheerdance competition of dance groups of the different UST colleges.

== Legends and symbolism ==
Various edifices are adorned by a pattern of a sun, symbolizing the sun of St. Thomas Aquinas. The UST seal itself, is bannered by a sun. The UST Grandstand stage and the Martyrs' Monument have floor designs that feature a sun.

=== Arch of the Centuries ===
It has been a superstition that crossing the Arch of the Centuries while still studying in the university would result in a delay of graduation. Another legend says that crossing the arch at midnight will make someone time travel to the Spanish era. Fr. Richard Ang, OP, Rector Magnificus of the University of Santo Tomas, dismissed the superstition, as he himself, an alumnus of the Faculty of Arts and Letters and the Ecclesiastical Faculties, frequently passed over the arch during his collegiate days.

=== Height of the Main Building ===
There is an unwritten rule among Thomasian architects that no structure will be higher than the cross of the Main Building. However, many new buildings built since 2000 such as the Beato Angelico Building, Quadricentennial Pavilion, Buenaventura Garcia Paredes, O.P. Building, the St. John Paul II Building of the University of Santo Tomas Hospital, and the Frassati Building have shadowed the edifice.

=== University in other languages ===
- The university on its third centennial: El Tricentenario
- Previous names of the faculties and colleges: Facultad de Teología, Facultad de Cánones, Facultad de Derecho Civil, Facultades de Medicina y Farmacia, Facultad de Filosofía y Letras, Facultad de Ingeniería, and Colegio de Bellas Artes
- Latin name: Pontificia et Regalis Sancti Thomæ Aquinatis Universitas Manilana (Pontifical and Royal University of Santo Tomas, Manila)
- Motto: Veritas in Caritate (Truth in Charity)
- Main Building: Tria Haec ("This Three") statues at the Main Building (Faith, Hope and Charity; Three Virtues of St. Paul)
- In the Miguel de Benavides Library cornice: "Has tenebrae cingunt mentis caligine terras Hoc Sancti Thomae Universitates Opus: Lumina Pandit" ("Darkness covers this land in a mental mist. This is the task of the University of Santo Tomas: to spread the light.")
- In the QuattroMondial monument: Pontificia et Regalis Universitas Sancti Thomae Aquantis Manilana MDCXI. Contemplari et Contemplata aliis Tradere. In Veritate fideles. In Labore proficientes. In Caritate divites ("To contemplate and to hand on to others the fruits of contemplation. In truth, faithful. In an effort to make progress. Rich in Love." According to the main sculptor, Ramon Orlina, the Latin inscriptions represents accomplishment, scholarliness and wisdom.
- In San Martin de Porres Building facade: Facultas Medicinae et Chirurgiae, Honora medicum. Opera eius sunt necessaria. Deus autem est qui vitae et mortis. Habet potestatem. Ars longa, vita brevis, occasio fugit, experimentum periculosum, iudicium difficile. (Faculty of Medicine and Surgery, honoring medicine. His works are necessary, God who has power over life and death.)
- In the Central Seminary Building: Facultates Ecclesiasticae
- Latin honors cum laude, magna cum laude, summa cum laude, meritus, bene meritus, and meritissimus

== Sporadic events ==
=== Installation of a new rector ===
The installation of a new rector is a solemn ceremony that marks the beginning of a new term of the Rector Magnificus of the UST. It is attended by representatives from the Commission on Higher Education, Church hierarchy, academic institutions, members of the diplomatic corps, alumni, and the students.

The Rite of Installation of the Rector Magnificus are highlighted by the following:

- Procession of the Academic Senate (deans and principals) and Top Administrative Officials of the University, followed by the Rector Magnificus and the Prior Provincial
- Reading of the appointment letter from the Dicastery for Culture and Education
- Profession of faith and Oath of Fidelity by the Rector before the Prior Provincial of the Dominican Province of the Philippines
- Bestowal of the Rector's Collar
- Entrustment of the Maces of the Rector Magnificus of the University of Santo Tomas
- Acceptance Address of the Rector Magnificus
- Singing of the University Hymn

During the rectorship of Rev. Fr. Rolando de la Rosa, OP (2008–2012) and Fr. Herminio Dagohoy, OP (2012–2016, 2016–2020), the installation took place after the Misa de Apertura, which occurred on the first day of the academic year. The installation of Fr. Richard Ang, OP was conducted on a ceremony separated from the Misa y Discurso de Apertura. (Note: Ang's installation on this first term was held on May 13, 2021, under COVID-19 restrictions, towards the conclusion of Academic Year 2020–2021. His installation for his second term was held on September 9, 2024, a month after Academic Year 2024–2025 already started.)

In 2012 and 2016, the installation of Rev. Fr. Herminio Dagohoy, O.P., for his inaugural and second term respectively, replaced the Discurso de Apertura. In 2021, Rev. Fr. Richard G. Ang, OP was installed as the 97th Rector of the University of Santo Tomas, with his first four-year term starting 13 May 2021, and his second four-year term beginning 9 September 2024.

=== UST at 500 ===
The UST Neo-Centennial Celebration in January 2012 is a week-long festivity that marked the countdown to 500 years. At the end of the pyromusical display on January 27, 2012, "UST 500" was spelled out using indoor fireworks atop the Main Building.

The Varsitarian Neo-centennial magazine supplement released in June 2012 was entitled "Toward 500".
