= University of Santo Tomas Conservatory of Music =

Music school of the University of Santo Tomas

- Established: 1945
- Dean: Maria Alexandra I. Chua
- Regent: Jose Ma. B. Tinoko
- Students: 431 (as of February 2024)
- Location: Albertus Magnus Building, Ruaño Drive, UST, Sampaloc, Manila
- Patron saint: Saint Cecilia
- Colors: Pink

The University of Santo Tomas Conservatory of Music, popularly known as "UST Music", is the music school of the University of Santo Tomas, the oldest and the largest Catholic university in Asia.

Proclaimed as one of the only two universities to be a Center of Excellence in Music, the college has maintained its efforts and achievements to be a premier music school. It is the only music school in the Philippines with an all-student symphony orchestra and an all-student symphonic band. The Conservatory of Music has choral groups namely, Coro Tomasino, Liturgikon Vocal Ensemble, and the UST Singers. It also has instrumental groups; the UST Jazz Band, the UST Guitar Ensemble, Rondalla, Woodwind Quintet, Brass Quintet, USTe Mundo- the ethnic ensemble and various smaller groups which can be called on as the need arises.

Every year, the conservatory takes most of the major prizes in competitions such as the National Music Competition for Young Artists (NAMCYA) and in other national music competitions. The Conservatory of Music is very proud that in terms of population, it is the biggest music school in the country, and is able to graduate a considerable number of competent and talented musicians every year.

It has produced a national artist, Ernani Cuenco.

The annual classical UST Christmas Concert is led by the conservatory students, faculty, and alumni.

== History ==
The UST Conservatory of Music traces its origin back to 1945 when the university started implementing music classes at the UST Gymnasium which was the home of the academic unit for a few years. These classes, however, were not yet recognized by the government at the time. It was in 1946 when the Philippine government granted it the authority to confer degrees upon its students with Manuel Cuerva as its inaugural director. In less than a year, Cuerva was succeeded by Julio Esteban Anguita who is known for composing the music of the UST Hymn. Anguita's tenure sought the development of a new music curriculum for all music institutions in the country. Top-tier Filipino musicians were already taking the place of foreign veterans in the scene. The conservatory also moved to the Quonset Hut in 1948 on which site now stands the Albertus Magnus Building.

Bernardino Custodio became the first Filipino director of the conservatory in 1958. Antonino Buenaventura, who was eventually proclaimed National Artist for Music, took over the directorship in 1961 and reorganized the UST Symphony Orchestra which was originally formed in 1927. Sergio Esmilla became director in 1964 during which the conservatory faced one of its most challenging points when most music schools in the country saw dwindling enrollment. It was also the time when the Quonset Hut was demolished to give way to the Albertus Magnus Building which now houses the conservatory. Benjamin Tupas then transitioned to the directorship in 1968. In 1972, renowned concert pianist Stella Goldenberg Brimo replaced Tupas as director. She was the first female director of the academic unit. It was during her term when the title "Director" was elevated to the status of "Dean" thereby making her the first administrator of the conservatory to become an ex-officio member of the university's Academic Senate. Brimo was succeeded by Dr. Alejandra Atabug who would eventually be Dean Emeritus of the university.

The deanship of Erlinda Fule saw the establishment of the UST Singers founded by pianist and conductor Fidel Calalang Jr. The said choral group would eventually be the famous two-time "Choir of the World at Llangollen Grand Prize" winner. It was also during Fule's term that the conservatory was proclaimed by the Commission on Higher Education as a Center for Excellence.

Concert pianist Dr. Raul Sunico, who was known for being the only pianist in the world to perform the four Rachmaninoff piano concertos in one evening, succeeded Fule in 2002. A jazz department was organized during Sunico's 15-year tenure. In 2017, Sunico was replaced by composer Dr. Antonio Africa whose term ended in December 2024. Currently, the deanship is entrusted to renowned musicologist Dr. Maria Alexandra Chua who was previously the Director of the UST Research Center for Culture, Arts, and Humanities.

== Academics ==
=== Programs ===
- Undergraduate programs
  - Bachelor of Music in Performance (majors in bassoon, cello, choral conducting, clarinet, contrabass, flute, French horn, guitar, oboe, orchestral conducting, percussion, piano, saxophone, trombone, trumpet, tuba, viola, violin, and voice)
  - Bachelor of Music in Composition
  - Bachelor of Music in Jazz
  - Bachelor of Music in Musicology
  - Bachelor of Music in Music Education
  - Bachelor of Music in Music Theatre
  - Bachelor of Music in Music Technology
- Graduate programs
  - Master of Arts in Music
  - Doctor of Philosophy in Music (major in music performance: choral conducting, guitar, piano, and voice)
