= University of Santo Tomas College of Fine Arts and Design =

Fine arts school of the University of Santo Tomas

- Former names: 1946 – College of Architecture and Fine Arts
- Established: 2000
- Dean: Asst. Prof. Mary Christie B. Que, MS
- Regent: Rev. Fr. Edgardo D. Alaurin, OP, SThL-MA
- Students: 2,131 (as of 2011)
- Location: Beato Angelico Building, Tamayo Drive, UST, Sampaloc, Manila
- Patron saint: Blessed Fra Angelico
- Colors: Maroon and Moss Green

The University of Santo Tomas College of Fine Arts and Design, popularly known as UST–CFAD, is the fine arts school of the University of Santo Tomas, the oldest and the largest Catholic university in Manila, Philippines. Founded as the Department of Fine Arts in 1935, it was restructured in 2000 as the College of Fine Arts and Design.

== History ==
The college originated from the original College of Architecture and Fine Arts (CAFA) founded in 1946. In 1785, the Dominicans made the first attempt to invest art and painting with academic value and formal presence and not merely an accessory to missionary work. That year when Fr. Juan Amador was Rector-chancellor of the university, the Academia de Bellas Artes was opened. The school, however, was not firmly established and its influence was not far-reaching for it was founded as an experiment. Its training on painting functioned only for a short time because there were few enrollees to that course. The Academia later became one of the Estudios de Adorno that existed in the University of Santo Tomas, Ateneo de Manila, and Colegio de San Juan de Letran. Thus in 1935, the Dominicans merely reestablished the fine art school with the primary goal of meeting the ever-present and increasing demand for good catholic artists. It was to be an institution designed to conform to the latest and most advanced artistic theories and practices.

From 1935 to 1939, students chose from two areas specialization, interior design and public school arts. Interior design was offered in order to meet the demands for professional interior designers due to construction and remodeling activities that were greater than ever. Public school art, according to Victorio Edades (the first school director), an answer to the immediate need of preparing future teachers of arts for private and public schools.

UST was the first Philippine school to introduce interior design as a fine arts major in 1954.

In 2000, the Department of Fine Arts separated from the College of Architecture. In 2002, the two colleges transferred to the Beato Angelico Building.

== Academic programs ==
- Undergraduate programs
  - Bachelor of Fine Arts (major in advertising arts, industrial design, and painting)
  - Bachelor of Science in Interior Design
- Graduate programs
  - Master of Fine Arts

== Notable people ==
The college has produced numerous national artists like Victorio Edades, Jerry Navarro Elizalde, and Ang Kiukok for Visual Arts. Ildefonso Santos Jr, Juan Nakpil, and Leandro Locsin for Architecture. Ronnie del Carmen, codirector of the Pixar film Inside Out, is an alumnus of CFAD.
