= UST Neo-Centennial Celebration =

Week-long anniversary

The UST Neo-Centennial Celebration is a week-long anniversary of the University of Santo Tomas in Manila, Philippines that commemorated the closing of the UST Quadricentennial Celebration.

== Opening ==
The celebration opened on January 20, 2012, with the "400 Shots to Immortality" photo exhibit at the UST Museum of Arts and Sciences and the Main Building lobby. It featured photographs of the UST campus and Thomasian life taken by Paul Allyson Quiambao, an Architecture student and former Varsitarian photography editor. The exhibit ran from January 20 to February 10, 2012. The photographs were documented beginning 2007, and were categorized into different sections by University archivist Regalado Trota-Jose. The categories were: "Unguarded Moments", "Our Fathers", "Royal, Pontifical, Spectacular", "Showcase of Thomasian Culture", "We are the Champions", "Record Breaker—13,266 Strong", "Quadricentennial Celebration", "UST in Paris", "Voted to Maria", "Larger than Life", and "The Promised Land". After the exhibit, the photographs were distributed to various university offices for display.

The Neo-Centennial week began with the thanksgiving mass and blessing of the new hospital building at the UST Hospital Grounds.

== University Fair ==
On January 24, 2012, the campus grounds were filled with the activities of the University Fair. The three-day Feria de la Tapa or "food fair" in Spanish, offered various Spanish cuisines made available for the students. The Flamenco Night featured a traditional dance from Spain on the second night of Feria de la tapa. Cirkulo Hispano Tomasino, a student organisation on Spanish culture, supervised the event.

== Grand Variety Show ==
Pyromusical display at the Grand Variety Show
Date	Title	Location and music	Ref.
January 27, 2012	Chariots of Fire	Arch of the Centuries; UST Main Building; UST Grandstand; Santisimo Rosario Parish	
January 27, 2012	Chariots of Fire	Duration: 10:18: 1. Yanni - "Adagio in C Minor"; 2. Cirque du Soleil - "Battlefield"; 3. Vangelis - "Chariots of Fire"; 4. Adele - "Rolling in the Deep"; 5. Coldplay – "Yellow"; 6. Audio Machine - "Akkadian Empire"	
