= University of Santo Tomas College of Architecture =

Architectural school of the University of Santo Tomas

- Former names: 1930 – Department of Architecture (Faculty of Engineering); 1938 – School of Architecture and Fine Arts; 1946 – College of Architecture and Fine Arts; 2000 – College of Architecture
- Established: 1930
- Dean: Ar. Rodolfo P. Ventura, MSAE
- Regent: Rev. Fr. Manuel F. Roux, OP, SThL-MA
- Students: 1,807 (2023)
- Location: Beato Angelico Building, Tamayo Drive, UST, Sampaloc, Manila
- Patron saint: Thomas the Apostle
- Colors: Maroon

The University of Santo Tomas College of Architecture is the architectural school of the University of Santo Tomas, the oldest and the largest Catholic university in Manila, Philippines.

Established in 1930, the college is one of the first architectural schools in the Philippines. It is also one of the only 2 to be proclaimed as a Center of Excellence in Architecture by the Commission on Higher Education and a consistent top performing school in the Philippine Architecture Licensure Examination.

== History ==
Established in 1930, it is one of the first architectural schools in the Philippines. It was renamed College of Architecture and Fine Arts in 1946 following the integration of Fine Arts degrees. The college was split in 2000, thus forming the College of Fine Arts and Design, separating the College of Architecture. The college was housed in the Roque Ruaño building which it shared with the Faculty of Engineering. It later moved in the new Beato Angelico building, together with the College of Fine Arts and Design.

== Degree programs ==
- Undergraduate program
  - Bachelor of Science in Architecture
- Graduate programs (offered at the UST Graduate School)
  - Master of Science in Architecture (majors in physical Planning, urban heritage preservation, and urban design)

== Notable alumni ==
The College has produced numerous men and women of the arts that gradually helped shaped Philippine Arts and Architecture.

- Aida-Cruz Del Rosario - The first female graduate of the college (1946), and the first female architect in the Philippines. While some sources credit Eulie Chowdhury as the first woman architect in Asia, others including Aida-Cruz Del Rosario were working at similar dates, and women like Perin Jamsetjee Mistri and Dora Gad preceded them.
- Ang Kiukok - National Artist for Visual Arts
- Ildefonso P. Santos Jr. - National Artist for Architecture
- J. Elizalde Navarro - National Artist for Visual Arts
- Leandro Locsin - National Artist for Architecture
- Francisco Mañosa - National Artist for Architecture and the designer of the Coconut Palace.
- Victorio Edades - National Artist for Visual Arts
- Jose Pedro "Bong" Recio and Carmelo Casas - founders of Recio+Casas Architects. They designed several of the country's iconic skyscrapers, such as The Shang Grand Tower, G.T. International Tower, LKG Tower, Pacific Plaza Towers, the Quadricentennial Pavilion, UST Multi-Deck Carpark, etc.
- Felino Palafox - Founder of Palafox Associates, ranked 94th (2006), is the only Southeast Asian Architectural firm to be included in the BD World Architecture. Designed the Rockwell Center in Makati, La Mesa Watershed, Ortigas Center, Makati Streetscape, Hidalgo Place, Jeddah Riviera Center, Saudi Arabia, Jumeirah Beach Residences, Dubai, Rabat Waterfront Development, Morocco, etc.
- Gabriel Formoso, founder of GF&P (Gabriel Formoso and Partners), the designer of a number of notable structures such as the Asian Institute of Management, The Peninsula Manila, PBCom Tower, Pacific Star Building, among others.
- Engracio Mariano - Designed the old BPI headquarters in Makati and Asian Development Bank headquarters in Ortigas Center.
- Abelardo Tolentino Jr. - founder, President, and CEO of Aidea Philippines Inc., which designed the university's Buenaventura Garcia Paredes, O.P. Building, The Columns in Makati, Mandani Bay Quay in Mandaue City, Cebu, Serendra in Taguig, and U.P.-Ayala Land TechnoHub in Quezon City.
