= University of Santo Tomas Faculty of Pharmacy =

Pharmaceutical school of the University of Santo Tomas

- Former names: 1871 – Faculty of Medicine and Pharmacy
- Established: 1871
- Dean: Aleth Therese L. Dacanay
- Regent: Pompeyo F. de Mesa
- Students: 3,055 (as of 2016)
- Location: Main Building, UST, Sampaloc, Manila
- Patron saint: Saints Cosmas and Damian, Immaculate Conception
- Colors: Purple

The University of Santo Tomas Faculty of Pharmacy is the pharmaceutical school of the University of Santo Tomas, the oldest and the largest Catholic university in Manila, Philippines.

Established in 1871, the faculty is the first school of pharmacy in the Philippines. It consistently tops the Philippine licensure examinations for Pharmacy and Medical Technology.

== History ==
The Facultad de Medicina y Farmacia or the Faculty of Medicine and Pharmacy was founded on May 28, 1871, by virtue of the modification of the Moret decree. The 6-year pharmacy program was offered. Don Leon Ma. Guerrero is considered to be the first graduate of the faculty. In 1901, when the American administration took over, the pharmacy curriculum was revised to four years. Also in the same year, the faculty was separated from the Faculty of Medicine and Surgery. Throughout the years, changes were made in the length of the program, from three years to five years. In 1984, the curriculum was set to four years.

In 1924, the faculty was the first college of the university to admit female students.

During the deanship of Dominican priest Lorenzo Rodriguez, two new programs were offered and the university botanical garden was reestablished. In 1958, medical technology was first offered in the faculty as an elective course. In 1959, A 3-year program in medical technology was approved. The following year, the fourth-year internship was given permission. On June 14, 1961, medical technology was recognized as a degree-level program. In 1962, the 5-year program of biochemistry was established. Forty-two students graduated in the program in 1967. In 1985, it was reduced to four years. The university was the first to offer all three programs.

A program in botany was offered in the faculty in 1986. However, it was discontinued in 2004 because of its limited enrolees.

The Commission on Higher Education identifies the pharmacy and medical technology programs as Centers of Excellence.

== Academic programs ==
Deans
Name	Tenure of office
Lorenzo Rodriquez	1946–1968
Jose Dayco
Norma Lerma	1981–1999
Rosalinda Solevilla	1994–2005
Priscilla Torres	2005
Ma. Elena Manansala	2013–2015
Aleth Therese Dacanay	2015-present

The faculty offers the following academic degree programs:

- Pharmacy (1871) – CHED Center of Excellence, PACUCOA Level IV program, AUN certified program
  - Clinical pharmacy (2010)
  - Doctor of Pharmacy (2017)
- Medical Technology (1959) – CHED Center of Excellence, PACUCOA Level IV program, AUN certified program
- Biochemistry (1962) – PACUCOA Level III program, AUN certified program
- Botany (1986–2004) (defunct)
- Master's and Doctoral programs of Medical Technology (2016) and Pharmacy are offered in the UST Graduate School.

== Research ==
The faculty performs its research engagements at the UST Research Center for the Natural Sciences and Applied Sciences (RCNAS), the science and technology research arm of the university at the Thomas Aquinas Research Center (TARC). Most of the research programs of the faculty deal with Molecular Diagnostics and Therapeutics, and Natural Products for Health and Wellness. RCNAS publishes its research papers, short communications, and review papers in the journal Acta Manilana.

== Notable alumni ==
- Hayden Kho - B.S. MedTech 2001
- Mariano Que - Doctor of Humanities honoris causa 2015, founder of Mercury Drug
- Vivian Que-Azcona - B.S. Pharmacy 1977, president of Mercury Drug
- Janine Tugonon - B.S. Pharmacy 2010, cum laude, 1st Runner-up Miss Universe 2012
