= University of Santo Tomas Faculties of Ecclesiastical Studies =

Ecclesiastical schools of the University of Santo Tomas

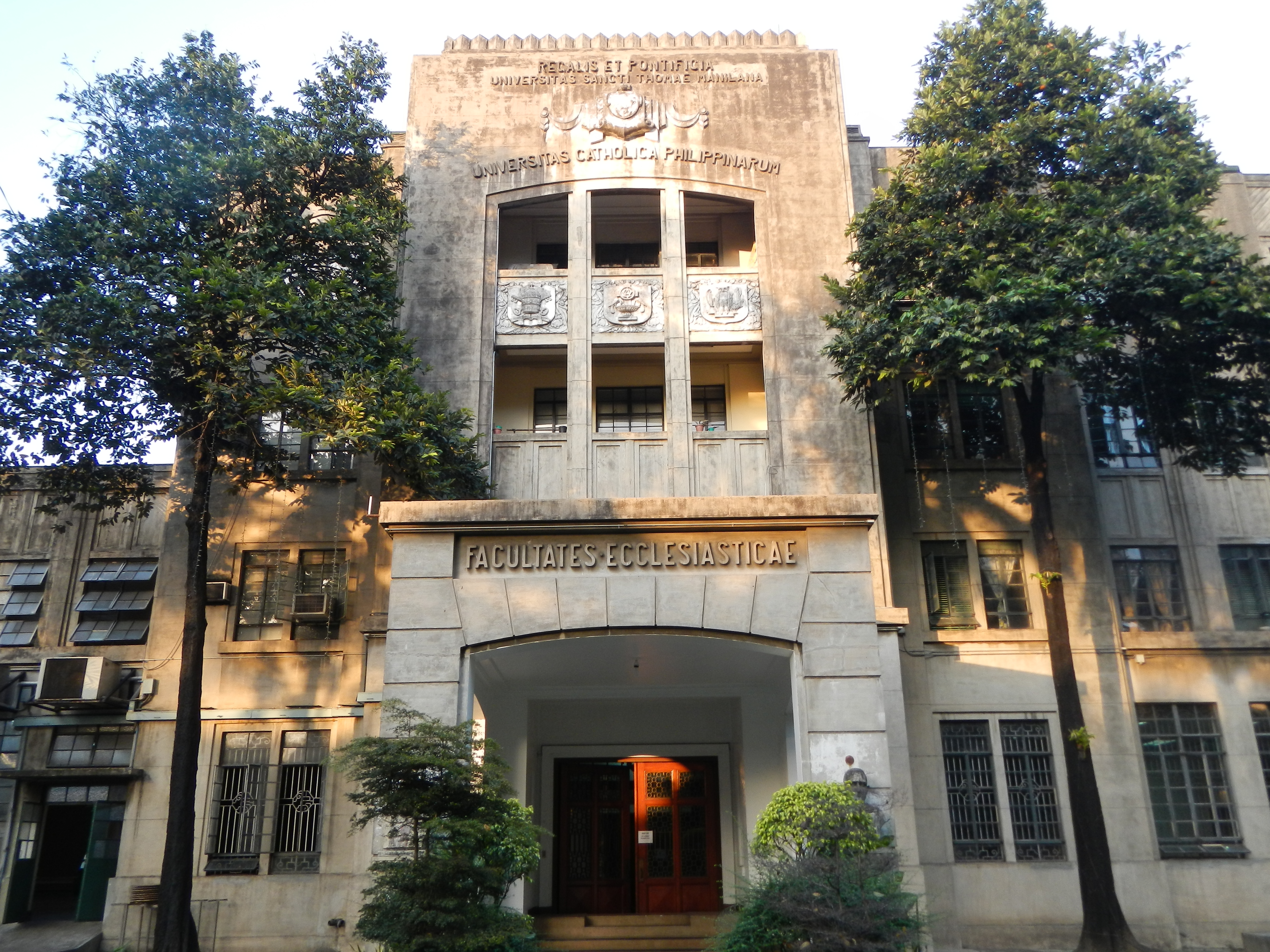
- Façade of the Central Seminary

The University of Santo Tomas Faculties of Ecclesiastical Studies (also known as UST Ecclesiastical Faculties and UST-Eccle) are the ecclesiastical schools of the University of Santo Tomas, the oldest and the largest Catholic university in Manila, Philippines.

Ecclesiastical Faculties consist of academic programs being offered since the university was founded in 1611, which prepare young men for the priesthood and for lay ministry service in the church. The degree programs for undergraduate studies were first offered, where the Faculties of Sacred Theology and Philosophy were founded. The Faculty of Canon Law was established in 1733.

== The Ecclesiastical Faculties ==
The Ecclesiastical Faculties, an integral part of the University of Santo Tomas, consist of the following:

- Faculty of Sacred Theology
- Faculty of Philosophy
- Faculty of Canon Law

The three Ecclesiastical Faculties are organically independent of one another, each one having its own governing body, faculty staff, and students, as well as their particular academic courses and programs.

University of Santo Tomas Faculty of Sacred Theology
- Established: 1611 – Facultad de Teología; 1978 – Sisters' Institute for Theological Formation
- Dean: Rev. Fr. Jannel N. Abogado, O.P., D.Th.Pat.Sci.
- Location: Central Seminary, UST, Sampaloc, Manila
- Patron saint: St. Thomas Aquinas
- Colors: White
- Website: eccle.ust.edu.ph

=== Faculty of Sacred Theology ===
Established in 1611, the purpose of the Faculty of Sacred Theology is to teach and conduct research on the truths of salvation revealed by God, preserved and taught by the Catholic Church, and lived, in union with the Universal Church, by the Christians in the Philippines and the Southeast Asia. It is tasked with the formation of the clergy and of the faithful at the level required for the certification of academic degrees conferred under the authority of the Holy See. It likewise aims to have a continued close collaboration with the Church Hierarchy, particularly with regard to the scientific analysis of the issues and problems of the times and their theological discernment from Christian faith, directed to integral Christian praxis.

The Faculty of Sacred Theology is as old as the university itself, since the primary purpose of the Dominican Fathers in founding this institution of learning was to train from among the young men who flocked to their lecture rooms worthy ministers of the altar.

==== Sisters' Institute for Theological Formation ====
July 1978 marked the foundation of the Sisters' Institute for Theological Formation (SITF), affiliated to the Faculty of Sacred Theology of the University of Santo Tomas. The first graduates of the two-year course received their diplomas on 28 March 1980.

With fifty-eight enrollees in school year 1978 to 1979, the SITF has grown to an enrollment of ninety-three students from twelve different Religious Congregations and Institutes for school year 1981–1982. At present, the Congregations, Institutes and Dioceses represented number to a total of eighteen.

The organization of the SITF is a response of the University of Santo Tomas to the needs of religious women for both theological and religious formation. And, in seeking the accreditation of the program by the Commission on Higher Education in 1995, the university responded to the needs for well-trained teachers of religion and values.

University of Santo Tomas Faculty of Philosophy
- Former names: 1896 – Faculty of Philosophy and Letters
- Established: 1611
- Dean: Rev. Fr. Christopher P. Garinganao, O.P., PhD
- Location: Central Seminary, UST, Sampaloc, Manila
- Patron saint: St. Catherine of Alexandria
- Colors: Blue
- Website: eccle.ust.edu.ph

=== Faculty of Philosophy ===
Philosophy was one of the earliest academic programs being offered since the University of Santo Tomas was founded in 1611. Bachelor, Licentiate and Doctorate degrees in Philosophy, by that time, were given only to those who are entering for priesthood, through the Faculty of Philosophy. In 1896, the program was enlarged and subsequently called Faculty of Philosophy and Letters, 285 years after the university's foundation.

In 1927, when the Central Seminary was to be established directly under the Sacred Congregation on Seminaries and Universities, and the University Administration, a complete separation of religious and lay students was brought about, according to the wishes of the Church, two courses had to be established:

- Ecclesiastical, subject to the laws of the Church; and
- Civil, subject to Philippine state legislation.

For this reason, the Faculty of Philosophy was established in the Central Seminary. This was intended to enable the students to undertake the study of Sacred Theology more profitably later on.

In the academic year 1959–1960, the University of Santo Tomas was allowed to offer a four-year Classical Liberal Arts Course simultaneously with the regular course offered by the Faculty of Philosophy, in accordance with Government Recognition No. 254, series of 1966, dated 22 July 1966. Thus, the curricula of the Faculty of Philosophy and of the Faculty of Arts and Letters were integrated in such wise that students enrolled in the said Faculty may obtain their Bachelor of Arts Classical degree (A.B. Classical).

Beginning with the academic year 1973–1974, all the institutional courses of philosophy were given in the first two years, making up the first cycle or first biennium leading to the Bachelor in Philosophy degree (PhB). The second cycle or second biennium would comprise the special courses leading to the Licentiate in Philosophy degree (PhL). The third cycle leads to a doctoral degree (PhD).

With the revision of the curriculum in the academic year 2001–2002, the A.B. Classical (civil degree) may be obtained in three years. By granting the privilege of an "autonomous status" to the university by the Philippine government in 2002, an ecclesiastical degree may be given its civil degree equivalent.

University of Santo Tomas Faculty of Canon Law
- Former names: 1681 – as an integral course of Moral Theology; Facultad de Cánones
- Established: 1733
- Dean: Rev. Fr. Romualdo Cabanatan, Jr., O.P., JCD
- Location: UST, Sampaloc, Manila
- Patron saint: St. Raymond of Peñafort
- Colors: Green
- Website: eccle.ust.edu.ph

=== Faculty of Canon Law ===
The Faculty of Canon Law aims to study and to promote the juridical disciplines in the light of the Gospel and to mold the students in the spirit of the Church's common Law, so that they may be prepared for scientific research regarding its development and interpretation, to teach the same in seminaries, houses of studies and Ecclesiastical Faculties, and be trained for professional practice in diocesan and religious curias as well as to hold special ecclesiastical posts. The Faculty of Canon Law shall research with special interest for ways and means to harmonize the difference between the laws of the Church and those of the State.

== Degree programs ==
=== Faculty of Sacred Theology ===
- AB Major in Theology (Institute of Theological Formation)
- Master of Arts in Ministry
- Master of Arts in Theology
- Bachelor in Sacred Theology
- Licentiate in Sacred Theology
- Doctorate in Sacred Theology

=== Faculty of Philosophy ===
- AB Philosophy (Classical)
- Bachelor in Philosophy
- Licentiate in Philosophy
- Doctorate in Philosophy

=== Faculty of Canon Law ===
- Bachelor in Canon Law
- Licentiate in Canon Law
- Doctorate in Canon Law
