= University of Santo Tomas College of Science =

Pure sciences school of the University of Santo Tomas

- Kolehiyo ng Agham (Filipino)
- Former name: College of Liberal Arts
- Established: 1926
- Dean: Rey Donne S. Papa
- Regent: Quirico T. Pedregosa, OP
- Students: 2,599 (2024)
- Location: UST Main Building
- Patron saint: Saint Albertus Magnus
- Colors: Azure

The University of Santo Tomas College of Science is the pure sciences school of the University of Santo Tomas, the oldest and the largest Catholic university in Manila, Philippines.

It offers nine Bachelor of Science degree programs, three of which are recognized by the Commission on Higher Education as a Center of Excellence in Chemistry, Biology, and Psychology. It also offers a Bachelor of Science degree in Microbiology, the only undergraduate microbiology program in the Philippines. It is the first in the university to have been accredited Level IV by the Philippine Association of Colleges & Universities Committee on Accreditation (PACUCOA). The college is located at the third floor of the UST Main Building.

== History ==
The college was established in 1926 as the College of Liberal Arts where it offered four-year programs leading to the bachelor of arts and bachelor of science, and a two-year program for associate in arts which served as preparatory courses for the law and medical schools.

The offerings of the college became diversified. Thus, specialized degree programs in the various fields of science were developed and introduced through the years: Chemistry (1931), Zoology (1947), Psychology (1948), and Mathematics and Physics (1952). In 1959, the preparatory course for medical school was extended to three years, in compliance with the requirements of the Medical Act.

In 1964, the College of Liberal Arts was reorganized. The A.B. program was ceded to the UST Faculty of Arts and Letters. The B.S. programs remained in the college, which became the College of Science.

Consistent with its goals of being relevant to the fast-developing world, the college introduced new degree programs in the succeeding years: Mathematics in 1966, Actuarial Science in 1974; Microbiology in 1981; Biology in 1982, B.S. Mathematics major in Computer Science in 1984, which was converted into Computer Science in 1999, Information Technology and Information Management in 1999, Applied Physics in 2001, and Applied Mathematics in 2009. UST is the only university that offers a B.S. in Microbiology program.

== Research ==
The research works of the college are conducted in the UST Research Center for the Natural and Applied Sciences (RCNAS) and the Research Center for the Social Sciences and Education.

The RCNAS includes the Fungal Biodiversity, Ecogenomics, and Systematics (FBeS) Group.

In 2023, the Philippine Department of Science and Technology funded the university to develop a yeast-based oral vaccine against COVID-19. Under the leadership of clergy-scientist and College of Science professor Nicanor Austriaco, the university is building the UST Laboratories for Vaccine Sciences, Molecular Biology, and Biotechnology or the UST VaxLab. It is a vaccine institute where scientists can develop and manufacture vaccines for diseases like COVID-19, African swine flu, tuberculosis, and other future diseases.

== Programs ==
- Undergraduate programs
  - Applied Mathematics, major in Actuarial Science – PACUCOA Level IV program
  - Applied Physics, major in Instrumentation
  - Biology – CHED Center of Excellence, PACUCOA Level IV program, AUN certified program
    - major in Environmental Biology
    - major in Medical Biology
    - major in Molecular Biology and Biotechnology
  - Chemistry – CHED Center of Excellence, PACUCOA Level IV program, AUN certified program
  - Data Science and Analytics
  - Microbiology – PACUCOA Level IV program
  - Psychology – CHED Center of Excellence, PACUCOA Level IV program, AUN certified program
- Graduate programs
  - Masters
    - Applied Physics major in Medical Physics
    - Biology
    - Biology Education
    - Chemistry
    - Chemistry Education
    - Microbiology
  - Doctorate
    - Biology
    - Chemistry
    - Clinical Psychology

== Notable alumni ==
- Francisco Duque III – B.S. Zoology 1978, former Philippine Secretary of Health
- Jove Francisco – B.S. Biology 1991, broadcast journalist
- Charlene Gonzales – B.S. Psychology 1999, actress, media personality and beauty pageant titleholder
- Honey Lacuna – B.S. Biology 1987, 24th Mayor of Manila
- Anthony Leachon – B.S. General Science 1981
- Ricardo S. Po, Sr. – B.S. Chemistry 1952, Doctor of Science honoris causa 2022, founder of Century Pacific Food
- Pinky Pe-Tobiano – B.S. Chemistry 1992
- Maria Rosario Vergeire – B.S. Zoology 1989, undersecretary for the Public Health Services Team and the official spokesperson of the Philippine Department of Health
