= University of Santo Tomas College of Education =

Teacher education school of the University of Santo Tomas

- Established: 1926
- Dean: Assoc. Prof. Pilar I. Romero, PhD
- Regent: Rev. Fr. Art Vincent M. Pangan, O.P., SThL,
- Students: 2,101 (as of 2011)
- Location: Albertus Magnus Building, Ruaño Drive, UST, Sampaloc, Manila
- Patron saint: Saint Joseph of Calasanz
- Colors: Orange, White

The University of Santo Tomas College of Education, popularly known as "UST-Educ", is the teacher education, nutrition and dietetics, food technology, and library and information science school of the University of Santo Tomas, the oldest and the largest Catholic university in Manila, Philippines. It was established in 1926 at Intramuros, Manila.

On June 2, 2008, the Bachelor of Elementary Education (BEEd) and Bachelor of Secondary Education (BSEd) programs of the College were proclaimed Center of Excellence (COE) in Education by the Commission on Higher Education. Likewise, the Department of Education designated it as a Center of Training (COT)

The different degree programs of the College are accredited by the Philippine Association of Colleges and Universities Commission on Accreditation (PACUCOA). In the academic year 2011-2012, the BSEd and BEEd programs have been granted Level III accreditation status. In 2013, the BSFT and BSND programs have been granted Level III re-accredited status. The BLIS program has also been granted Candidate accreditation status last academic year 2014-2015.

The College is a top performing school in the board examinations for teachers, nutritionist-dietitians and librarians.

== History of the College ==
The U.S.T. College of Education was founded in June 1926 during the rectorate of Very Rev. Fr. Manuel Arellano, O.P. Classes at the college commenced in Intramuros, Manila. It offered the four-year Bachelor of Science in Education (B.S.E.) degree.

In 1940, the normal school was established and offered a two-year course leading to Elementary Teachers Certificate (E.T.C.). In 1941, the Elementary Training Department was opened as a laboratory school of the College of Education. In 1953, the degree Bachelor of Science in Home Economics (B.S.H.E.) was offered. In June 1954, the Elementary Teachers Certificate was changed into a four-year degree called Bachelor of Science in Elementary Education. From 1955-1957, a new major in Food and Nutrition was added; and later transformed into Bachelor of Science in Foods and Nutrition (B.S.F.N.).

In the school year 1970-71, the Institute of Nutrition was established as an independent body from the College of Education under the Vice Rector for Academic Affairs. Another significant event in 1971 was the merging of the Normal School with the College of Education due to the decreasing enrollment rate of the former. In July 1971, a Special Assistant to the Dean was created to take charge of the Normal elementary School since the Directress and the Secretary of the School positions were abolished.

From 1974-1976, the College offered new major studies in Chemistry and in School Guidance & Character Education. The latter major replaced the co-major in Theology. The College introduced the following terminal courses to meet the demands for manpower: Certificate in Practical Arts (2 years), Certificate in Practical Dietetics (2 years) and Tourist Guide Certificate (1 year). The two former courses/programs were later on phased out while the Tourist Guide Certificate was changed into Associate in Tourism (2 years).

In the 1980s, the College of Education phased out all vocational courses/programs and the Institute of Nutrition was abolished. Later on, the College offered the following four-year degree programs: Bachelor of Science in Tourism, Bachelor of Science in Nutrition and Dietetics, and Bachelor of Science in Hotel & Restaurant Management.

From 1990-1992, new majors for the Bachelor of Secondary Education program were offered: Computer Technology Education; Home Management and Vocational Technology (which replaced Home Economics); and Values Education (which replaced the Guidance and Character Education). The Early Childhood Education was also introduced as a new major for the Bachelor of Elementary Education program.

In the School Year 2006-07, the B.S. Tourism and B.S. Hotel and Restaurant Management programs were transferred into a newly established body of the University - the Institute of Tourism and Hospitality Management (I.T.H.M.). The I.T.H.M. was later renamed as College of Tourism and Hospitality Management.

In 2004, the College collaborated with Hanyang University (South Korea) for a student-exchange program.

In 2007, the College was the second top performing school in the nutrition-dietetics board exam with a passing rate of 80%, higher than the national passing rate of 56.40%. Four Thomasians entered the Top Ten Examinees of the said P.R.C. examination.

In the April 2008 Licensure Examination for Teachers (Secondary Level), the College was the second top performing school with a high 95% passing rate. Two Thomasian BSEd alumni entered the Top Ten Examinees' list.

In the school year 2008-09, the Bachelor of Elementary Education (BEEd) and the Bachelor of Secondary Education (BSEd) programs have been granted the Center of Excellence (COE) status after undergoing the stringent evaluation of the Commission on Higher Education (CHEd). The COE status lasted from June 2, 2008 until June 2, 2011.

In 2008, the Department of Education (DepEd) designated the College as a Center of Training (COT) in MAPEH. Since then, DepEd and U.S.T. College of Education have been collaborating for the annual Teacher Induction Program (T.I.P.) for the public school teachers.

In April 2009, Asst. Prof. Leonila Wilhelmina N. Baltazar of the Department of Biological and General Sciences landed 8th place in the LET Secondary Level. Two other Thomasian BSEd graduates were also among the Top 10. In the November 2010 board exam for librarians, Kristi Ma Fevie Villapando Macasaet garnered the 9th Place with the score 85.10%.

In the September 2011 Licensure Examination for Teachers (LET), the College was the number one school for the Elementary Level with the highest passing rate of 97.59% (81 out of 83 Thomasians passed). On the other hand, it was the fourth top performing school in the Secondary Level with a passing rate of 88.26% (218 out of 247 examinees passed). The national passing rate for LET Elementary Level was 22.68% and 31.45% for LET Secondary Level. Asst. Prof. Erlyn M. Geronimo, a faculty member of the College and a supervising teacher of the Education High School, landed 1st Place in the exam with a percentage score of 87.80%.

In November 2011, the Bachelor of Elementary Education and Bachelor of Secondary Education programs of the College achieved Level III PACUCOA (Philippine Association of Colleges and Universities Commission on Accreditation) accreditation.

In July 2012 board exam for nutritionists and dietitians, U.S.T. was declared as the second top-performing school with 93 out of 99 examinees who passed (93.94% passing rate). Three Thomasians made it to the Top 10 Examinees' list namely: Hannah Paulyn Yu Co (1st Place - 87.00%), Patricia Alyanna Gerona Cardoza (3rd Place - 85.05%), and Kevin Estrera Carpio (4th Place - 84.95%).

In September 2012, U.S.T. was recognized by the Professional Regulation Commission as a top performing school in the elementary and secondary education levels. In the Elementary Level, U.S.T. was the SECOND TOP PERFORMING SCHOOL with 136 out of 138 examinees who passed the exam (98.55% overall passing rate). Likewise, U.S.T. was the NUMBER ONE SCHOOL on the list of THE TOP PERFORMING SCHOOLS in the Secondary Level with 160 out of 166 new Thomasian high school teachers (96.39% overall passing rate).

In November 2012, U.S.T. was one of the 3 top performing schools in the November 2012 Librarian Board Exam with 31 out of 38 Thomasians who passed the test (81.58% passing rate).

== Some notable alumni ==
- Dr. Evelyn Songco, Ph.D. - long-time dean of students of the University of Santo Tomas, former president of the Philippine Historical Association
- Paz Latorena - Famous author of "The Small Key" and other short stories; former faculty member of the UST.
- Genoveva Edroza-Matute - a famous short story writer and teacher; recipient of the first-ever Palanca Award for Literature (in Filipino); author of "Kuwento ni Mabuti."
