= List of University of Santo Tomas buildings =

The following is a list of buildings at the University of Santo Tomas (UST) in Sampaloc, Manila.

The university sits on an almost perfect square of 21.5 hectares. The university transferred to its present campus in 1927 when the Dominicans deemed the Intramuros campus inadequate for the university's growing population. The first structures in the campus were the imposing Main Building, the Santisimo Rosario Parish, and the UST Gym. The Main Building and Central Seminary were declared National Cultural Treasures by the National Museum of the Philippines on January 25, 2010.

== University facilities ==
=== Academic facilities ===
| Building | Image | Constructed | Style | Architect | Notes | Ref. |
|---|---|---|---|---|---|---|
| Albertus Magnus Building | | 1969 | International Style | Manuel Francisco | Named after the Dominican Albertus Magnus, the building houses the College of Education, the Alfredo M. Velayo College of Accountancy, the University of Santo Tomas Conservatory of Music, and the Education High School. The building also used to house the university's elementary department before its cessation in 2011. | |
| UST Carpark | | 2004 | Form follows function | Pedro Recio and Carmelo Casas | Located in front of the UST Hospital, a four-level structure wherein the first three levels consist of a multi-level carpark with operating commercial spaces in the first two levels. The UST-AMV College of Accountancy formerly occupied the fourth level of the building. | |
| Beato Angelico Building | | 1991; 2002–2003 | Postmodern | Yolanda Reyes | The eight-storey structure named after Fra Angelico houses the College of Architecture, and the College of Fine Arts and Design. It also houses The UST Publishing House which took the place of the UST Press and the UST Printing Office. | |
| Benavides Building | | 1978 | International Style | Augusto M. Concio | The building was built after the original edifice was burned down on 1975. Currently, the UST Junior High School occupies the building. | |
| Buenaventura Garcia Paredes, O.P. Building | | 2014 | Modern | Abelardo Tolentino, Jr. | Named after the then-Master of the Order of Preachers, Buenaventura García de Paredes. The twelve-storey building is built on the site of the original UST Gymnasium. It houses both the Faculty of Arts and Letters and College of Tourism and Hospitality Management, formerly used by Senior High School before relocating to the Frassati Building in 2019. | |
| Central Laboratory | | 2017 | Modern | Casas Architects | The eight-storey structure houses the laboratory skills facilities of the Faculty of Pharmacy, the College of Science and the College of Rehabilitation Sciences, as well as Laboratory Equipment and Supplies Office (LESO) and Research Center for Culture, Arts, and Humanities office. | |
| Main Building | | 1927 | Renaissance Revival | Roque Ruaño | The Main Building of the University of Santo Tomas declared a national treasure by the Philippine government, houses the Administration offices, the Faculty of Civil Law, the Faculty of Pharmacy, the College of Science and the Institute of Religion. | |
| Roque Ruaño Building | Facade of Roque Ruano Building | 1950 | International Style | Fernando Ocampo and Julio Victor Rocha | It is a five-storey, E-shaped building named after the alumnus who designed the UST Main Building, Rev. Fr. Roque Ruaño, O.P. It houses the Faculty of Engineering. | |
| St. Martin de Porres Building | | 1952 | Bauhaus | Manuel Francisco and Julio Victor Rocha | Named after Martin de Porres, the building is the home of the Faculty of Medicine and Surgery, College of Nursing, and College of Rehabilitation Sciences. The UST Medicine Auditorium, the largest auditorium in UST, is also located in this structure. | |
| St. Pier Giorgio Frassati, O.P. Building | | 2019 | Contemporary | Casas Architects | The 23-storey building is the tallest of the university's structures and the first one to have been situated outside the Manila campus. It currently houses the UST Senior High School and the College of Information and Computing Sciences. | |
| St. Raymund de Peñafort Building | | 1955 | International Style | José María Zaragoza | Named after St. Raymund de Peñafort, the patron saint of canon lawyers, the building houses both the Faculty of Arts and Letters and the College of Commerce and Business Administration; formerly houses the Jose Rizal Auditorium on the first floor. | |

=== Administrative buildings ===
| Building | Image | Constructed | Style | Architect | Notes | Ref. |
|---|---|---|---|---|---|---|
| Main Building | | 1927 | Renaissance Revival | Roque Ruaño | The Main Building, an academic facility, also functions as the university's administrative center. It is also the home of the Museum of Arts and Sciences. | |
| UST Tan Yan Kee Student Center | | 2006 | Elegant yet passive | Adrian Chua | The 28.5m x 30m four-storey building houses several administrative offices, such as the Office for Admissions and the Office for Student Affairs, as well as the university-wide student organizations such as The Varsitarian and the Central Student Council. | |

=== Libraries ===
| Building | Image | Constructed | Style | Architect | Notes | Ref. |
|---|---|---|---|---|---|---|
| Miguel de Benavides Library | Miguel de Benavides Library | 1989 | International Style | Mauro Simpliciano | An exclusive building for the library was finally inaugurated in 1990 when the UST Central Library Building was inaugurated. The six-storey library, named after the founder of the university, Miguel de Benavides, is one of the biggest in Asia. | |

=== Research centers ===
| Building | Image | Constructed | Style | Architect | Notes | Ref. |
|---|---|---|---|---|---|---|
| Thomas Aquinas Research Complex | | 2002 | Postmodern | Yolanda Reyes | The massive edifice named after the patron saint of the university is a semi-centralized system for the productive exchange of ideas among researchers in the fields of arts, humanities, science, technology, social sciences, and education. It also houses the university's Graduate School. | |
| Henry Sy Sr. Hall | | 2024 | Postmodern | Rodolfo Ventura | The 7-storey building houses the Saints Cosmas and Damian Center for Simulation and Research of the Faculty of Medicine and Surgery and the William F. Austin Center for Ear and Hearing Healthcare. It is named after the founder of SM Investments, Henry Sy. | |

=== Athletic facilities ===
| Building | Image | Constructed | Style | Architect | Notes | Ref. |
|---|---|---|---|---|---|---|
| Quadricentennial Pavilion | Façade of the Quadricentennial Pavilion | 2011 | Modern | Recio and Casas Architects | The four-storey pavilion with an arena, retractable chairs, and bleachers has a seating capacity of 5,792. It serves as the new UST gymnasium that houses the varsity players of the university and the UST Growling Tigers. It also serves as a multipurpose center where graduations, university-wide activities, exhibits, national and international conferences are held. It was inaugurated in early 2012. | |

=== Religious buildings ===
| Building | Image | Constructed | Style | Architect | Notes | Ref. |
|---|---|---|---|---|---|---|
| Central Seminary Building | Facade of Central Seminary Building | 1933 | Art Deco | Fernando Ocampo | This building houses the UST Chapel (which is also the Santisimo Rosario Parish Church) the UST Central Seminary, and the UST Ecclesiastical Faculties. The Parish was canonically inaugurated on April 26, 1942, by Michael O'Doherty, the Archbishop of Manila during that time. | |

=== Medical facilities ===
| Building | Image | Constructed | Style | Architect | Notes | Ref. |
|---|---|---|---|---|---|---|
| UST Health Service | Facade of Health Services building at UST | 1946 | Art Deco | | The UST Health Service serves as the university clinic. It provides primary health care to students, employees, and administrators. | |
| UST Hospital | UST Hospital facade | 1941 | Art Deco | | The UST Hospital formally opened its charity unit on February 15, 1945, in a building which stood at the rear of the Main Building. The building house classrooms for the medical school and became the site of the first charity hospital. Its main building is also known as the St. Vincent Ferrer, O.P. Building. | |
| UST Hospital – Benavides Cancer Institute | | 2006 | Postmodern | Yolanda Reyes | The four-story edifice, in commemoration of Miguel de Benavides' 400th death anniversary, is the first one-stop cancer therapy center in the Philippines which was inaugurated on August 21, 2006. | |
| UST Hospital – Clinical Division | UST Hospital-Clinical Division facade | 1965 | International Style | | On March 7, 1946, the charity hospital was opened together with UST Hospital, occupying the first floor. The whole charity ward was transferred and eventually renamed the USTH-Clinical Division when it was completed in 1965 and formally inaugurated on March 6, 1966. This building is also known as the St. John Macias, O.P. Building. | |
| UST Hospital Extension | | 2019 | Contemporary | John Joseph Fernandez | Also known as the St. John Paul II Building, this 11-storey building serves as an expansion of the private division of the UST Hospital. | |

== Demolished buildings ==
| Building | Image | Constructed | Demolished | Style | Notes | Ref. |
|---|---|---|---|---|---|---|
| Quonset Hut | | 1948 | 1964 | American Craftsman | Dubbed as the "concert hut", the structure houses the Conservatory of Music and was located between the UST Hospital and Roque Ruaño Building. It was demolished in 1964 to give way to the construction of Albertus Magnus Building. | |
| UST High School Building | | ca. 1950 | 1975 | | The UST High School (USTHS) Building was burned down in a fire in 1975. On 1976, classes in high school were transferred to the UST Central Seminary. The new USTHS building was inaugurated in the same year and is now known as the Benavides Building. | |
| UST Printing Press Building | | 1953 | 1990 | | The structure was located in the corner of Padre Noval Street and España Boulevard. It was demolished in 1990 to give way to a new school building, now known as the Beato Angelico Building. The press was renamed UST Publishing House and is currently housed in the new building. | |
| Gymnasium | Front gate of UST Gymnasium | 1933 | 2011 | Bauhaus | Designed by Fernando Ocampo, the UST Gymnasium was once the largest gym in the country. It housed the Institute of Physical Education and Athletics as well as the university's swimming pool and PE annex. It was demolished to give way to the Buenaventura Garcia Paredes, O.P. Building with façade and swimming pool retained. | |
