= Frassati =

Frassati is an Italian surname. Notable people with the surname include:

- Dominique Frassati (1896–1947), French-Corsican painter
- Luciana Frassati Gawronska (1902–2007), Italian author
- Pier Giorgio Frassati (1901–1925), Italian canonized Catholic activist

== See also ==
- Frassati Building, a 23-storey building in Sampaloc, Manila in the Philippines
- Frassati Catholic High School, a private high school in Harris County, Texas
- International Frassati Path of Pollone, a path in Piedmont
