= University of Santo Tomas Senior High School =

Senior high school of the University of Santo Tomas

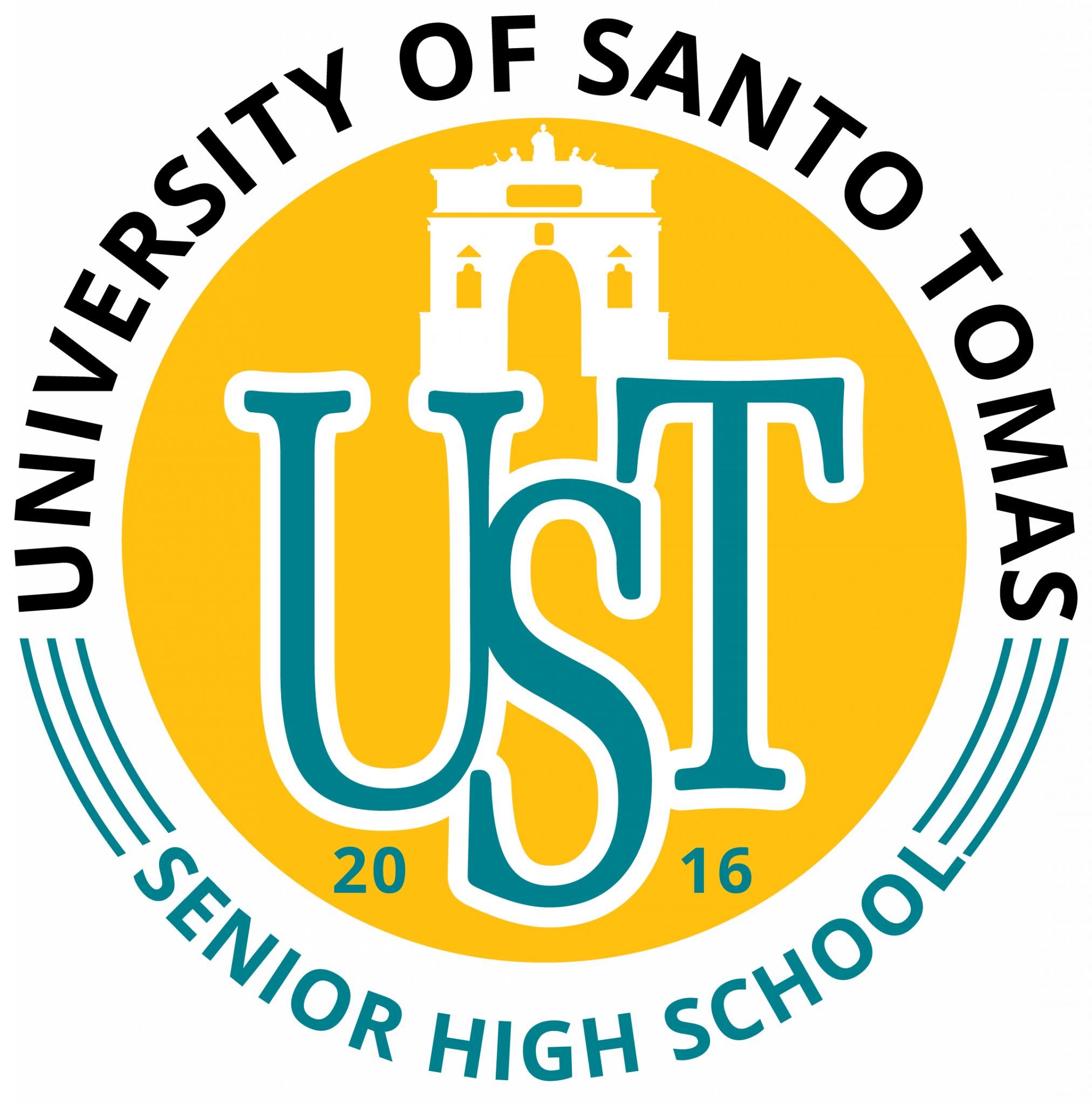
- Established: 2016
- Principal: Assoc. Prof. Mary Erika N. Bolaños, LPT, PhD
- Regent: Rev. Fr. Ermito G. de Sagon, O.P.
- Students: 5,549 (as of August 2025)
- Location: Saint Pier Giorgio Frassati Building, España Blvd, UST, Sampaloc, Manila
- Newspaper: La Stampa
- Patron saint: Blessed Pier Giorgio Frassati
- Colors: Teal Gold
- Nickname: UST Senior High or UST SHS

The University of Santo Tomas Senior High School, popularly known as UST SHS or UST Senior High, is the senior high school of the University of Santo Tomas, established in 2016. It is one of the university's three academic units offering basic education.

== Academics ==
The academic programs include core subjects that adhere to the curriculum guides set by the Department of Education, along with contextualized subjects that are shared among all program but tailored to suit the specific focus of each. Additionally, each program offers specialized subjects geared towards preparing students for their chosen tertiary programs.

=== Programs ===
- Science, Technology, Engineering, and Mathematics Program (STEM) – a curriculum is based in pursuing tertiary programs related to physical sciences, mathematics, engineering, and technology. It is aligned with college programs in the College of Science, Faculty of Engineering, College of Architecture, and the College of Information and Computing Sciences.
- Business and Entrepreneurship Program (BE; formerly but still known as Accountancy, Business and Management or ABM) – is solely based in management with its specialized subjects being business mathematics, accountancy, business organization, economics, entrepreneurship, finance, marketing, as well as ethics in business. It is aligned with college programs in the AMV–College of Accountancy, College of Commerce and Business Administration, and the College of Tourism and Hospitality Management.
- Health-Allied Program (HA) – different from other senior high schools which the University offers to those who will work on the health profession. The curriculum offers lessons on anatomy, physiology, biology, chemistry as well as physics. It is aligned with college programs in the Faculty of Pharmacy, College of Nursing, and the College of Rehabilitation Sciences.
- Humanities and Social Sciences Program (HUMSS) – is mainly based in liberal arts education and social sciences aligned with college programs in the Faculty of Arts and Letters and the College of Education.
- Music, Arts, and Design Program (MAD) – focuses in performing arts, media, visual arts, and industrial design aligned with those who want to pursue a degree in the College of Fine Arts and Design and Conservatory of Music.
- Physical Education and Sports Program (PES) – is a track whose curriculum is based in sports and wellness, with coaching and fitness leadership. It is aligned with college programs in the Institute of Physical Education and Athletics.

== Facilities ==
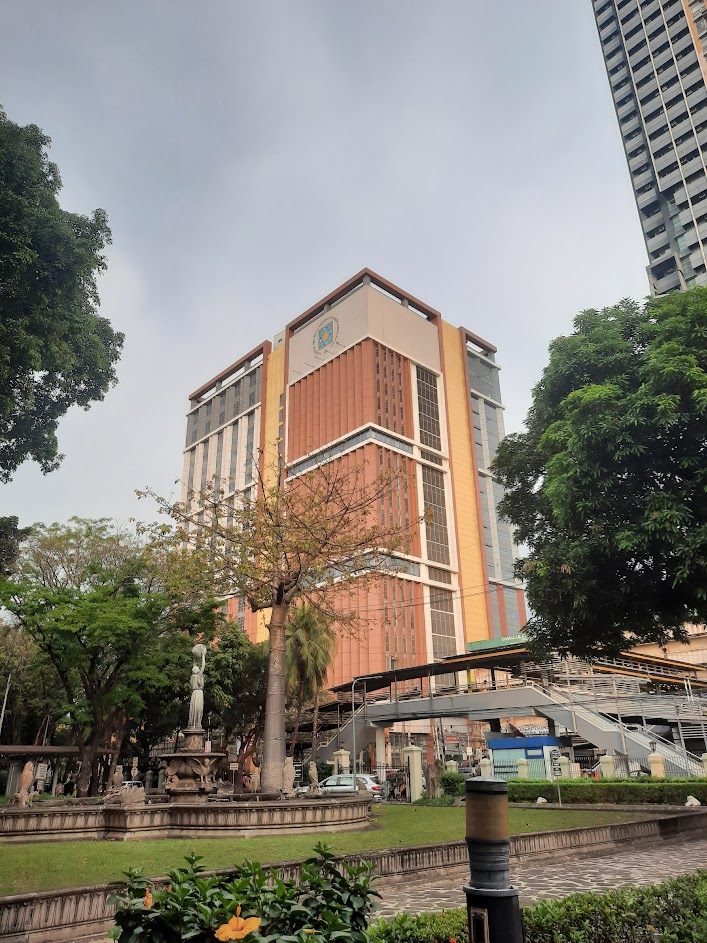
The Saint Pier Giorgio Frassati Building, which houses both the Senior High School and the College of Information and Computing Sciences.

The UST Senior High School initially resided in the Buenaventura Garcia Paredes Building before relocating to the Saint Pier Giorgio Frassati Building in 2019. The UST Senior High School is situated on the 10th to 15th floors of the Frassati Building, positioned in the southeastern part adjacent to the UST campus and connected via a link bridge.

The Miguel de Benavides Library also has a branch in its sixth floor, which is exclusively for UST Senior High School students.

== Student Organizations ==
The UST Senior High School is home to various student organizations.

- UST SHS Student Council, the highest governing body of the senior high school
- UST SHS COMELEC, the official student election authority of the senior high school

=== Student publication ===
- La Stampa, official student publication of the senior high school

=== Student-based organizations ===
- UST SHS STEM Society, the official society of STEM
- UST SHS ABM Society, the official society of BE/ABM
- UST SHS HUMSS Society, the official society of HUMSS
- UST SHS Health Allied Society, the official society of HA
- UST SHS MAD Society, the official society of MAD
- UST SHS PES Society, the official society of PES

=== Academic-based organizations ===
- Alinaga, reading club
- El Tigre Robotica, robotics club
- Future Scientist Club, science and technology club
- Thomasian Debate Varsity, debate and public speaking club
- Crisis Control Council, disaster readiness and risk reduction club
- Hilagyo, philosophy club
- Math Wizards Club, organization for math enthusiasts
- Scholia, official organization of UST SHS scholars

=== Skills-based organizations ===
- Samahang Galian, filipino club
- Multimedia Club (MMC), multimedia enthusiasts
- UST SHS Atelier, artworks, digital arts, photography, film club
- UST Sinagtala, performing and theater arts club
- UST Tiger SHOOT, (Senior High Organization of Outstanding Talents) events production and talent club
- UST SHS Galvanize, dance club which also represents UST in the juniors division of the UAAP Street Dance Competition
- UST Sayaw Sining, cultural dance club
- Virtuoso, voice and instrument, music club / chorale

=== Religious organizations ===
- UST SHS Pax Romana Unit, premier religious organization of the UST SHS based on the University's Pax Romana.
- Beads of Mary Organization, religion club
- Dominican Network Youth Group - UST SHS, Dominican network local organizations of DYG Philippines
- Missionary Families of Christ - HIGH, religion club
- TOMAS, community development club
- Thomasians for Peace, religion club

== See also ==
- University of Santo Tomas
