= Buenaventura Garcia Paredes, O.P. Building =

Building in Manila

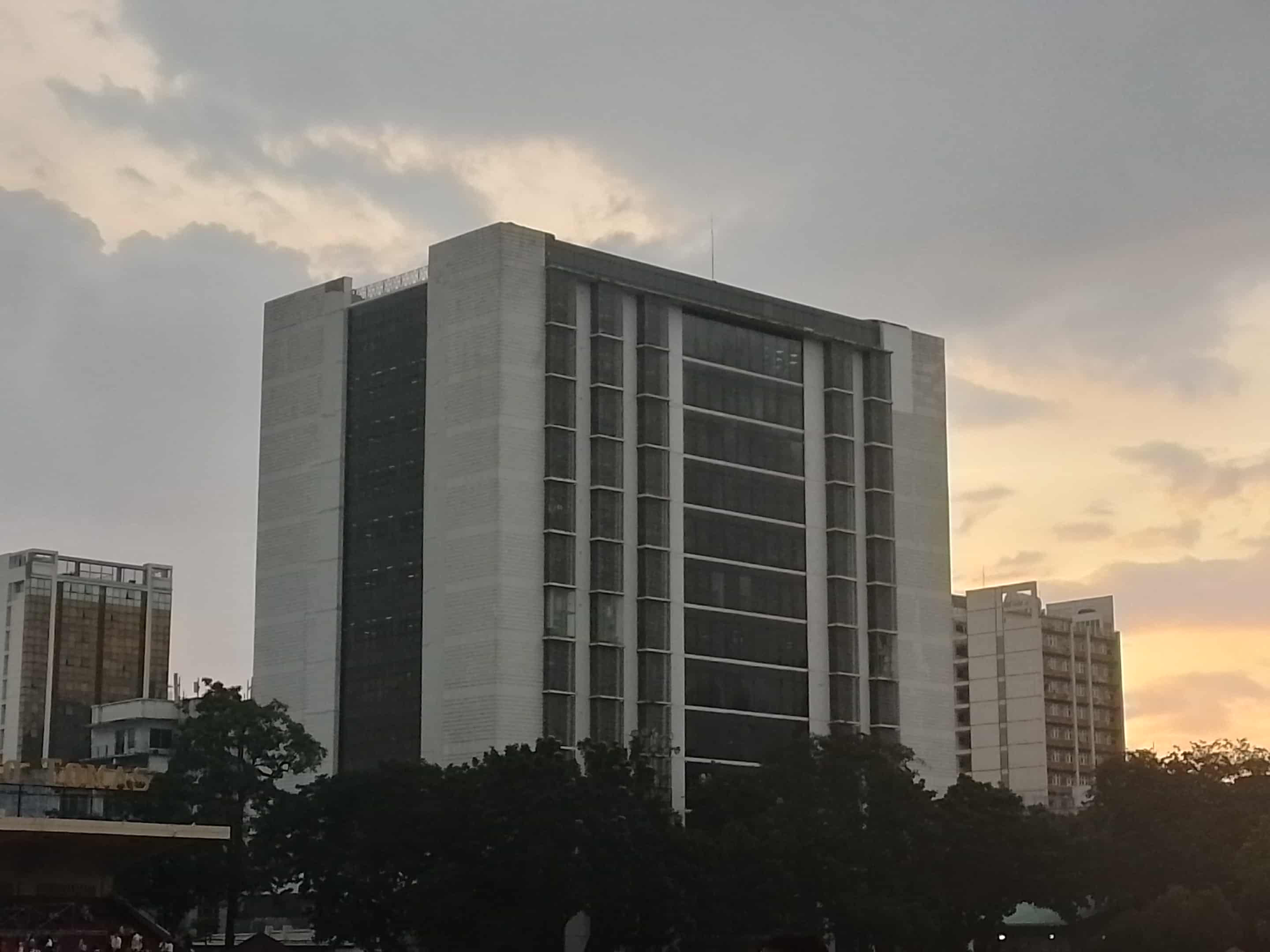
- BGPOP in 2025

- Location within Philippines
- Alternative names: Thomasian Alumni Center

General information
- Status: Completed
- Type: Alumni Center; School Building
- Location: corner of Ceferino Gonzales and Tamayo Drives, UST, España, Sampaloc, Manila, Philippines
- Coordinates: 14.6083°N 120.9861°E
- Current tenants: UST Office of Alumni Relations, UST Communications Bureau, Tiger Media Network, UST College of Tourism and Hospitality Management, University of Santo Tomas Faculty of Arts and Letters
- Groundbreaking: February 4, 2010
- Construction started: 2011
- Completed: 2014
- Opened: August 2014
- Owner: University of Santo Tomas

Technical details
- Floor count: 12

Design and construction
- Architects: Abelardo M. Tolentino, Jr.

The Buenaventura Garcia Paredes, O.P. Building, colloquially known as BGPOP, is a 23-storey building in Sampaloc, Manila in the Philippines. It is one of the major facilities built in the Manila campus of the University of Santo Tomas. It serves as the meeting place of all members of the university's alumni in the Philippines and abroad.

The structure honors the name of Blessed Buenaventura García de Paredes, who was a law professor of the University and a Master of the Order of Preachers martyred in 1936 during the religious persecution in Spain.

The site is the original location of UST's gym, which was the largest in the Philippines when it was built. Given its historic importance to UST, the gym's front and rear façade were kept. The adjacent Olympic-sized swimming pool was retained, yet refurbished.

== History ==
In June 2010, UST Rector Rolando dela Rosa visited the Thomasian alumni based in the United States. He addressed the members of the alumni in the U.S., particularly the Thomasian medical practitioners to invite them to come home and join the festivities for UST's quadricentennial anniversary. This happened during the 18th Annual Grand Reunion and Medical Convention of the UST Medical Alumni Association in America or USTMAAA. During the event, the UST Rector acknowledged the association's pledge of US$1 million for the construction of the Thomasian Alumni Center.

The demolition of the original UST gymnasium started on April 6, 2011, after which construction began. The building was completed in 2014, and opened in August of the same year.

== Facilities ==
The alumni center has twelve floors and a mezzanine. The ground floor features a grand lobby that serves as the center's main converging point. The center's grand ballroom, known as the Dr. Robert C. Sy Grand Ballroom, is on the second floor. The third floor is the location of the Office for Alumni Affairs and the offices of each faculty/college-based alumni association. The center has hostel facilities for accommodation services for traveling and returning alumni.

=== Occupants ===
The Faculty of Arts and Letters used to hold some classes in the building from its completion in 2014 until 2016. The faculty returned in 2020 with the now-dissolved Department of Communication and Media Studies, which handles the Communication and Journalism programs. In 2024, Arts and Letters dean Melanie Turingan stated that the faculty intends to expand its presence in the building. At present, the faculty occupies the 10th and 11th floors.

The College of Tourism and Hospitality Management also transferred to the building in 2020; it was previously based at the Albertus Magnus building. The college currently utilizes the 4th to 8th floors.

Since its inception in 2017, the Graduate School of Law also occupies the 4th floor.

The UST Senior High School held classes in the building when it was established in 2016, before transferring to the Frassati Building in 2019.

The UST Educational Technology (EdTech) Center formerly occupied the building until it moved to the Frassati building in 2020. It shared the 12th floor with the university's Communications Bureau (which handles Tiger Media Network) when it was founded in 2018, the latter having absorbed EdTech's former space. The Office of Alumni Relations and the individual alumni chapters of each faculty and college are located on the building's 3rd floor.

== See also ==
- List of University of Santo Tomas buildings
