= Woodland garden =

Garden style including large trees and flowers

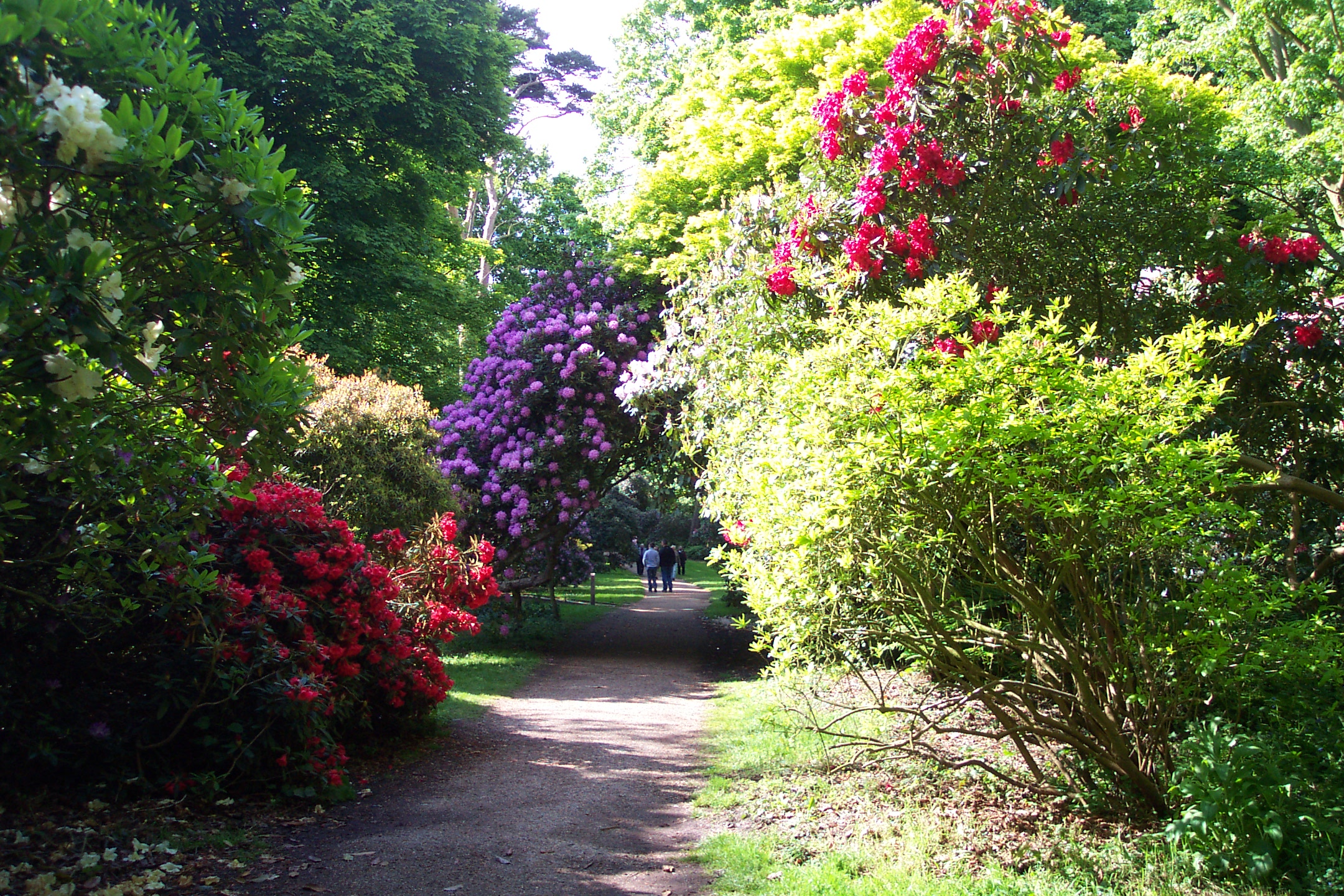
Rhododendron garden, Sheringham Park, originally a country house garden by Humphry Repton, with many species collected by Ernest Henry Wilson a century later.

A woodland garden is a garden or section of a garden that includes large trees and is laid out so as to appear as more or less natural woodland, though it is often actually an artificial creation. Typically it includes plantings of flowering shrubs and other garden plants, especially near the paths through it.

The woodland garden style is essentially a late 18th- and 19th-century creation, though drawing on earlier trends in gardening history. Woodland gardens are now found in most parts of the world, but vary considerably depending on the area and local conditions. The original English formula usually features tree species that are mostly local natives, with some trees and most of the shrubs and flowers from non-native species. Visitable woodlands with only native species tend to be presented as nature reserves. But for example in the United States, many woodland gardens make a point of including only native or regional species, and often present themselves as botanical gardens.

But in both countries, very many woodland gardens rely heavily on Asian species for large flowering shrubs, especially the many varieties of rhododendron: "What the pelargonium was for Victorian bedding schemes, the rhododendron was for the woodland garden".

Forest gardening is a different concept, mostly concentrated on food production.

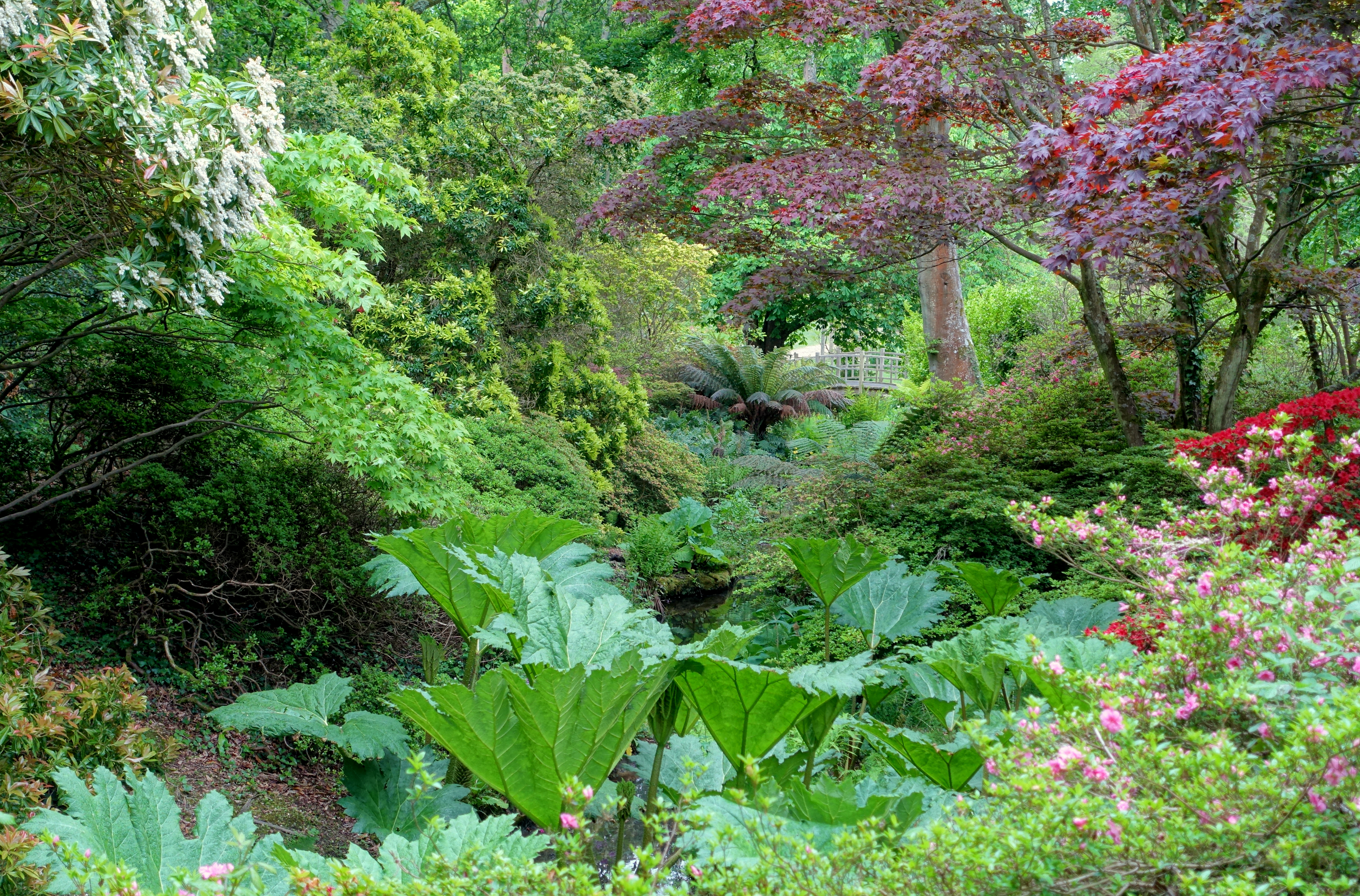
Woodland garden planting at Exbury Gardens, taken on June 1.

== 18th-century England ==
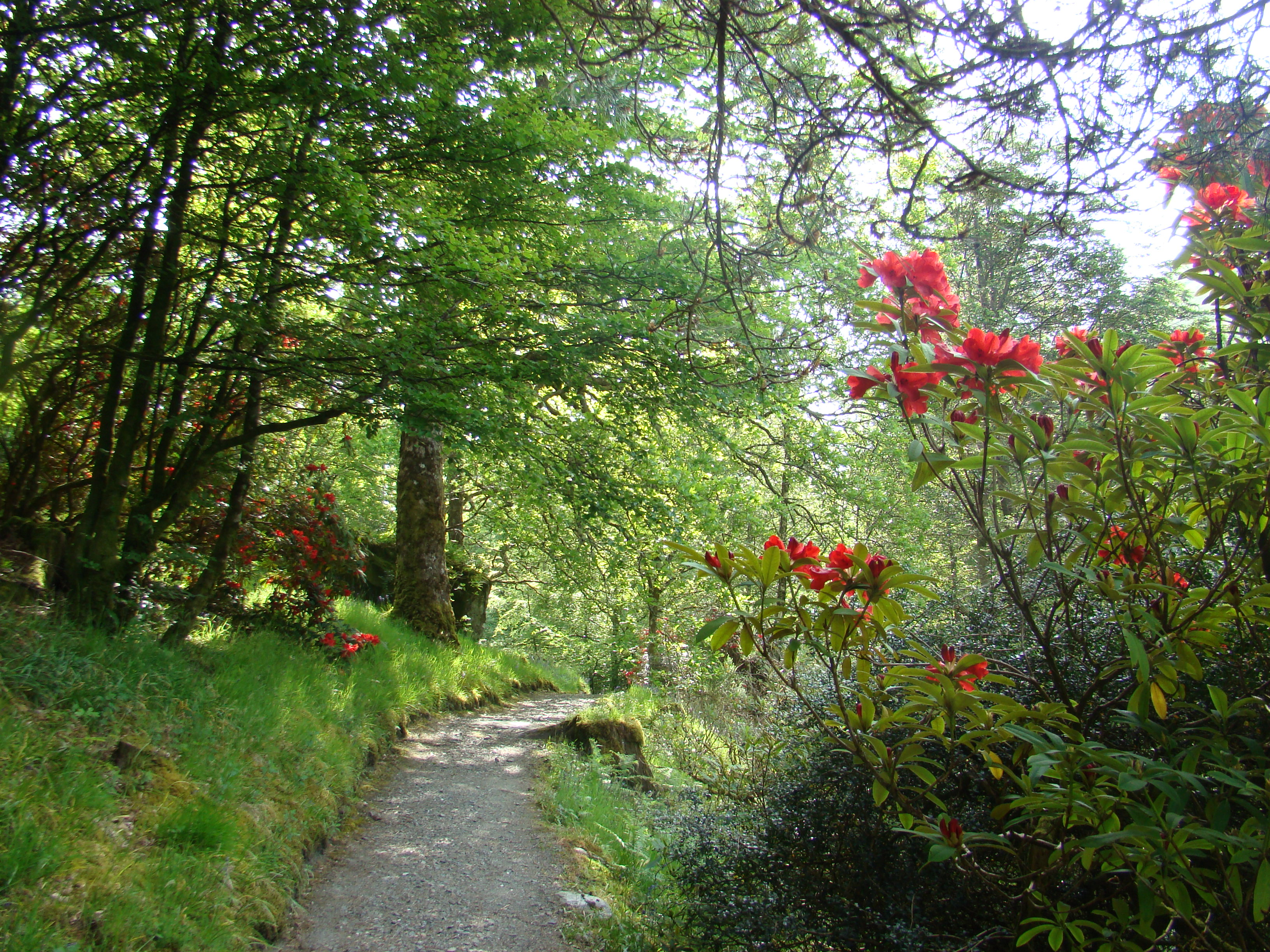
Ardkinglas Garden, near Loch Fyne

In Europe the large gardens of country houses often included in the enclosed area a park, whether used for deer or grazing by horses and farm animals, and often woodland. Beyond the formally arranged gardens, paths through the woodland and park were known in England as "wood walks". These were probably mostly given little alteration from their natural state other than some attention to bridging streams and keeping paths open and easily navigable, but there was some deliberate planting of flowers and shrubs, especially native climbers. The range of native flowering trees and shrubs that had great ornamental value, and would also grow north of the Alps, was relatively small, and some of these were apparently planted around woods, along with the growing number of available imported species.

In the French formal garden style that influenced all Europe during the Baroque period of the 17th and 18th centuries, when the garden aspired to reach into the surrounding landscape, much of the space of the further garden away from the house was occupied with bosquets, dense artificial woodland divided into geometric compartments surrounded by high hedges, in large gardens like the Gardens of Versailles as much as 20 feet high. The English term for these was a wilderness.

The relatively well-documented decision before 1718 not to turn Ray or Wray Wood at Castle Howard into a formal wilderness, as had been proposed by George London, is taken by garden historians as a significant point, "decisive for the development of the 'natural' style of English landscape". This was a natural wood, to the side of the main axis of the garden of the newly built house, which was instead "turned into a labyrinth of tangled paths, enlivened by various fountains", but at least initially, little special planting. Stephen Switzer, an advocate of ornamental woodland, may have been involved with the new design.

In the early 18th century the English horticultural trade began to enthusiastically import new plants from British America, generally the eastern seaboard of the modern US; Philadelphia was the main port for shipments. Leading figures in the trade included John Bartram, collecting, propagating and packing in America, and Thomas Fairchild and Philip Miller, distributing and promoting the new plants from London. Many of these were flowering shrubs, and by the mid-century the shrubbery had become established as a fashionable area to have in a garden; the word is first documented in 1748.

Gradually, the woodland garden evolved from these three styles of garden, as shrubberies gradually replaced the now unfashionable wilderness, and began to expand into the wood walks. The wilderness had already begun to lose its French geometrical strictness, first in the smaller walks within the hedged "quarters" or blocks, which were already winding and curving before 1700, and then, from perhaps 1710, in the main walks. This irregularity, often expressed in the fashionable serpentine shape for walks, laid out like snakes, was almost invariably adopted for the new shrubberies, and later became normal for the woodland garden.

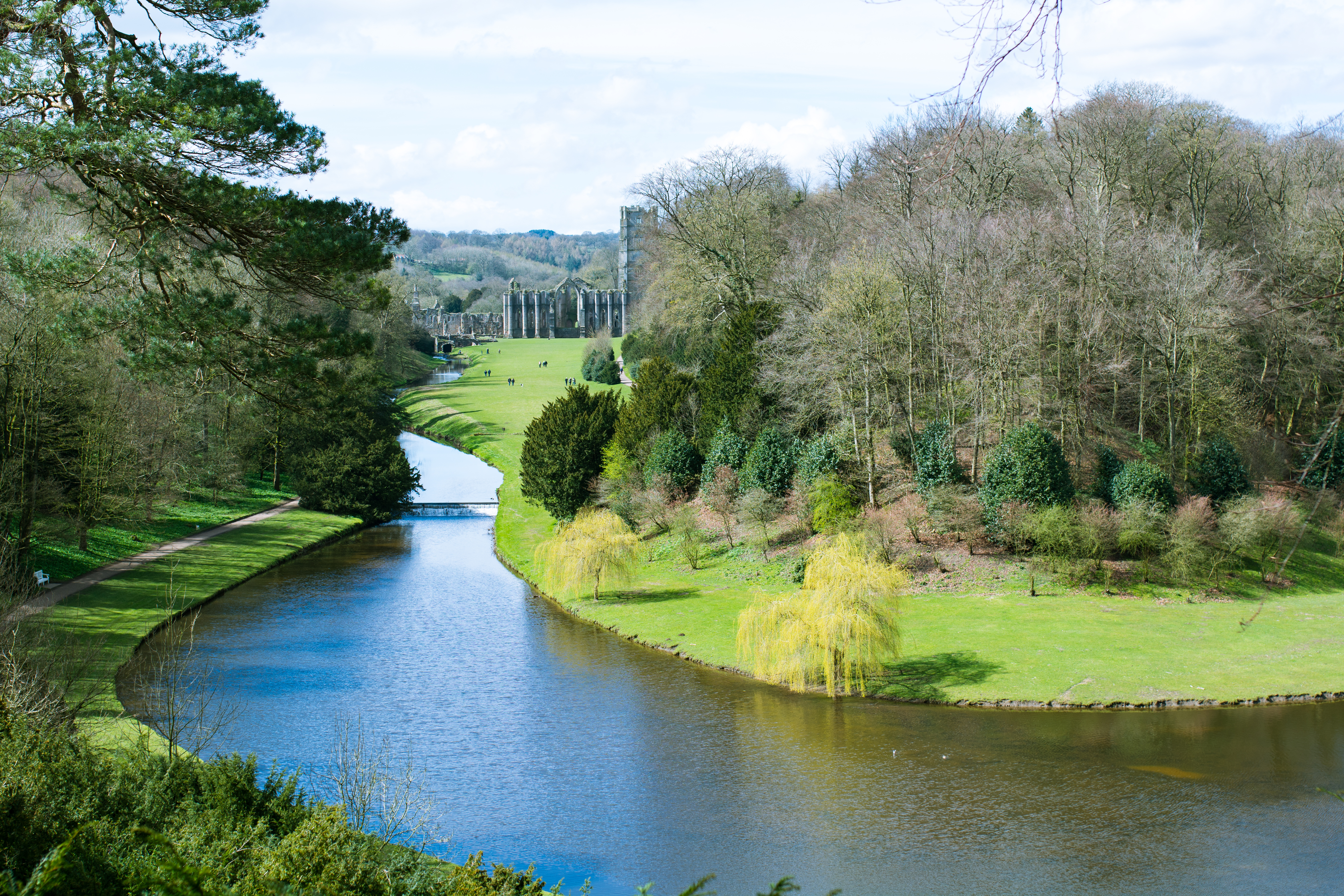
"The Surprise View", of the ruins of Fountains Abbey, Studley Royal

=== The "forest or savage garden" ===
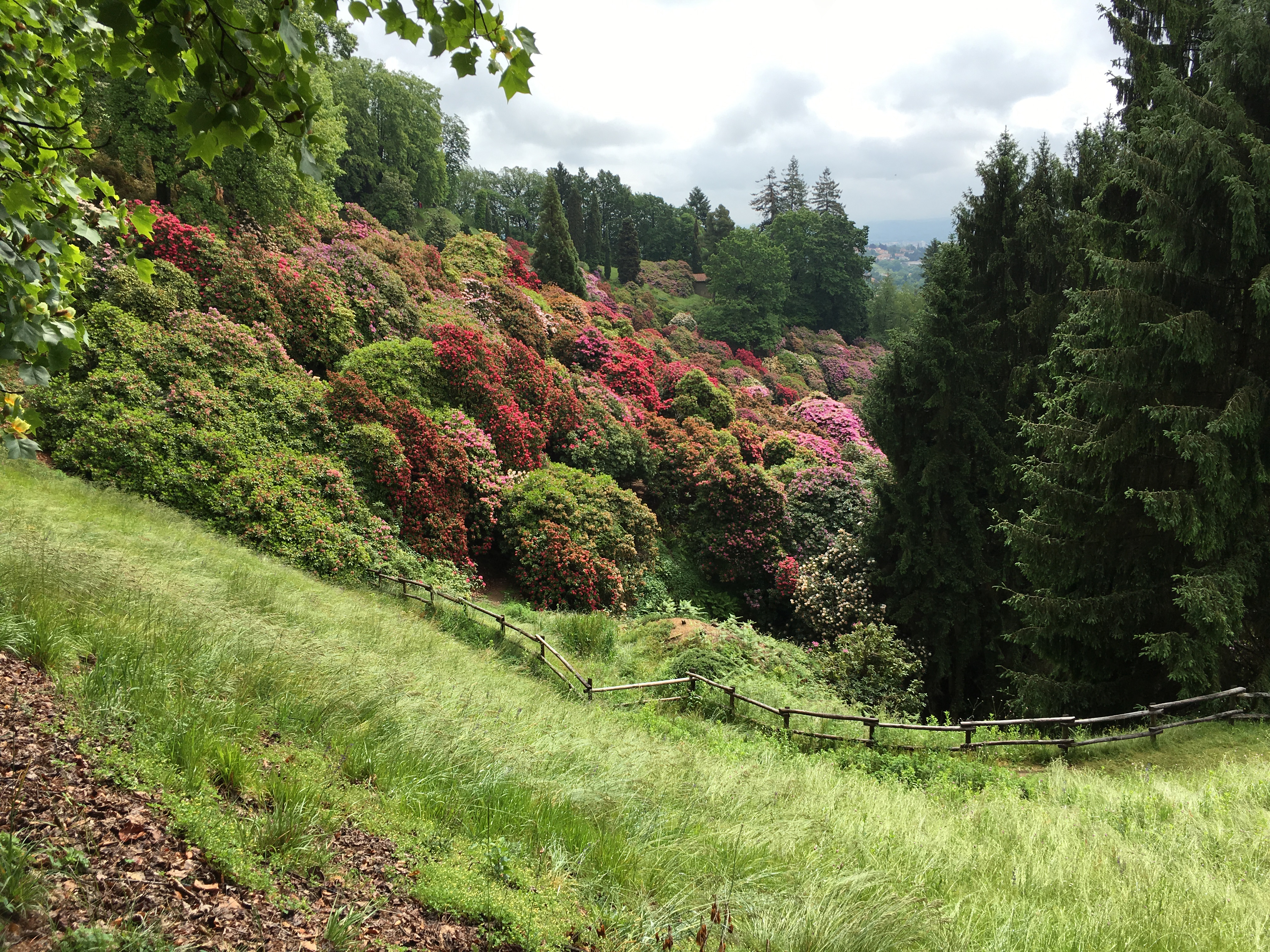
Rhododendron "bowl" in north Italy, Parco della Burcina

A description of a "grove" planted by 1746 in the garden of William Shenstone, describes what would today be called a woodland garden:

... opaque and gloomy, consisting of a small deep valley or dingle, the sides of which are enclosed with regular tufts of hazel and other underwood, and the whole shadowed with lofty trees rising out of the bottom of the dingle, through which a copious stream makes its way through mossy banks, enamelled with primroses, and variety of wild wood flowers.

"Enamelled" or "embroidered" (Shenstone's own preferred term) was a term of art in early gardening, implying special planting of flowers, and we know that in 1749 he planted flowers given by his friend Lady Luxborough by this stream.

Horace Walpole, a great promoter of the English landscape garden style, praised Painshill in Surrey, whose varied features included a shrubbery with American plants, and a sloping "Alpine Valley" of conifers, as one of the best of the new style of "forest or savage gardens". This was a style of woodland aiming at the sublime, a newly-fashionable concept in literature and the arts. It really required steep slopes, even if not very high, along which paths could be made revealing dramatic views, by which contemporary viewers who had read Gothic novels like Walpole's The Castle of Otranto (1764) were very ready to be impressed. The appropriate style of garden buildings was Gothic rather than Neoclassical, and exotic planting was more likely to be evergreen conifers rather than flowering plants, replacing "the charm of bright, pleasant scenery in favour of the dark and rugged, gloomy and dramatic". A leading example of the style was Studley Royal in North Yorkshire, which had the great advantage, at what was known as "The Surprise View", of suddenly revealing a distant view from above of the impressive ruins of Fountains Abbey.

== America ==
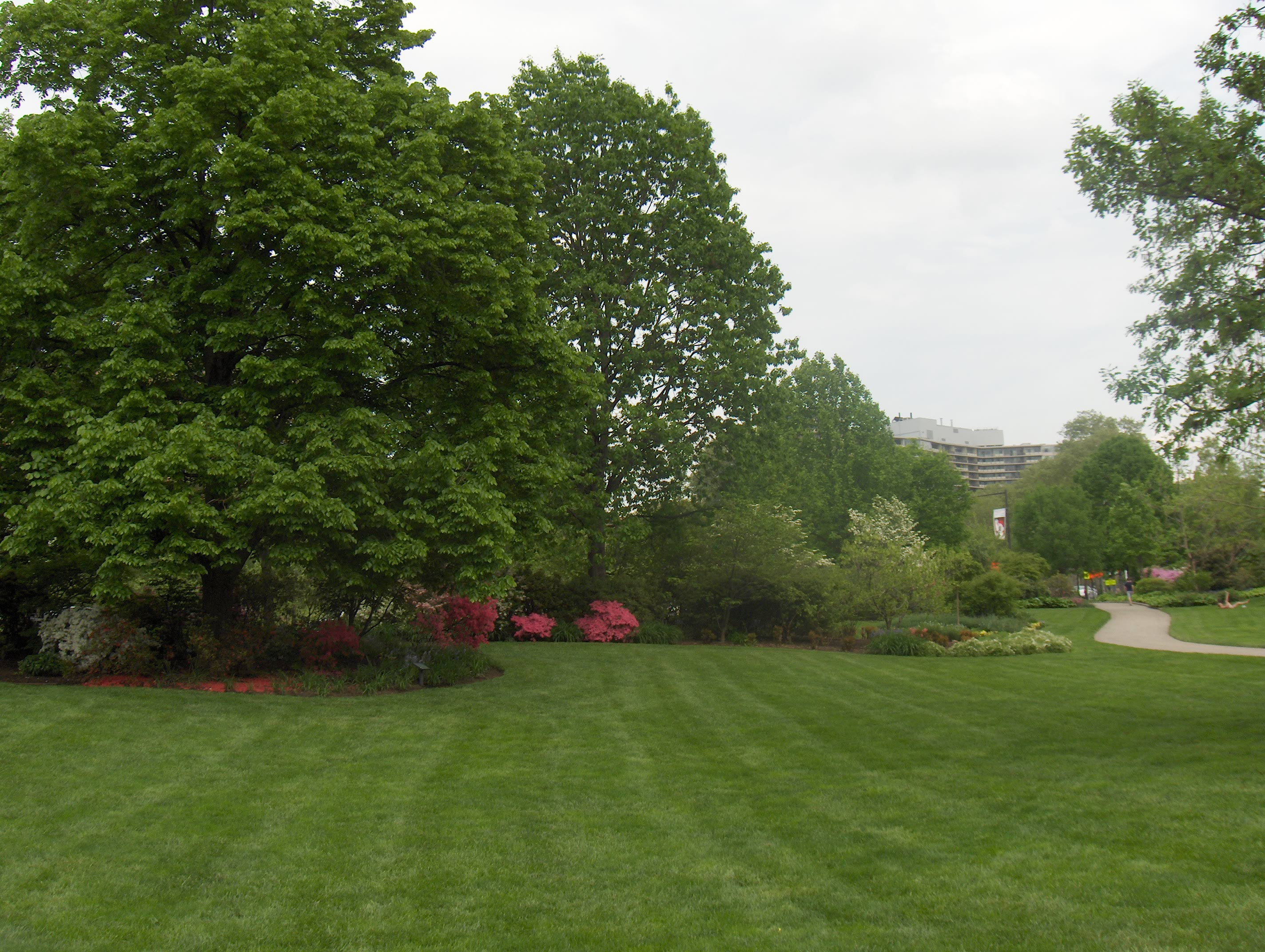
Fairmount Park, Philadelphia, which includes Belmont Mansion

By 1762 Belmont Mansion near Philadelphia had "a wood cut into Visto's [avenues and walks giving views], in the midst a chinese temple, for a summer house, one avenue gives a fine prospect of the City, with a Spy glass you discern the houses distinct, Hospital, & another looks to the Oblisk".

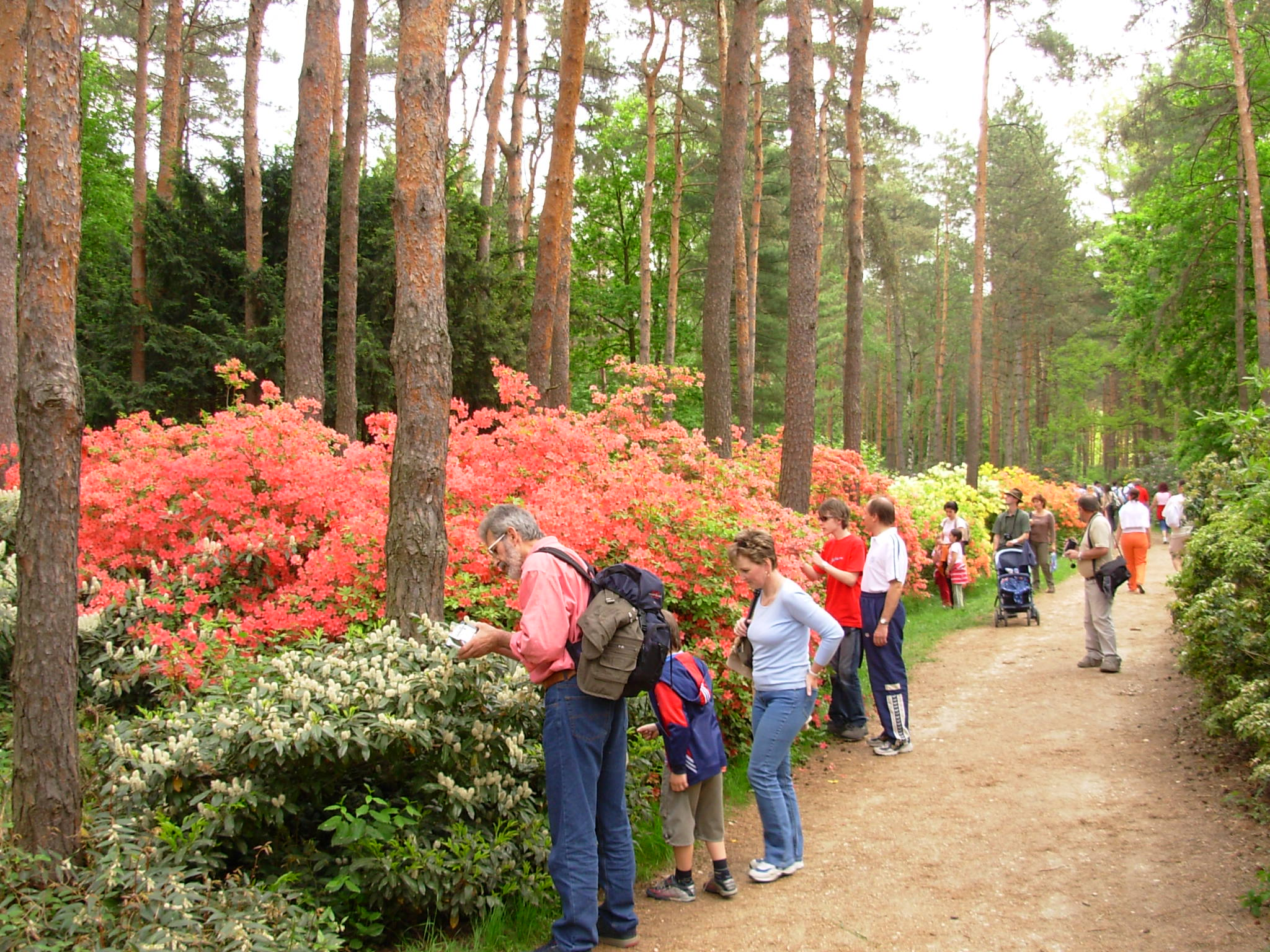
Jeli-Arboretum, Kám, in Hungary

Thomas Jefferson was a keen garden visitor during his years in France and England in the 1780s. He generally had a high opinion of English gardening, writing: "gardening in that country is the article in which it surpasses all the world", if often a rather acerbic critic of individual gardens, as shown in his notes and letters. Seeing the new shrubberies filled with American plants in England, he realized that back home "gardens may be made without expense. We have only to cut out the superabundant plants...", which is more or less what he did in "The Grove" at Monticello, with extra planting, some of imported plants. He cleared much of the undergrowth, and trimmed the lower branches of the large trees. In hot American summers, shaded garden areas were extremely welcome, as he wrote to the leading American gardener William Hamilton, in 1806:

They [the English] need no more of wood than will serve to embrace a lawn or glade. But under the beaming, constant and almost vertical sun of Virginia, shade is our Elysium. In the absence of this no beauty of the eye can be enjoyed...

He continued:

Let your ground be covered with trees of the loftiest stature. Trim up their bodies as high as the constitution & form of the tree will bear, but so as that their tops shall still unite & yeild [sic] dense shade. A wood, so open below, will have nearly the appearance of open grounds. Then, when in the open ground you would plant a clump of trees, place a thicket of shrubs presenting a hemisphere the crown of which shall distinctly show itself under the branches of the trees. This may be effected by a due selection & arrangement of the shrubs, & will I think offer a group not much inferior to that of trees. The thickets may be varied too by making some of them of evergreens altogether, our red cedar made to grow in a bush, evergreen privet, pyrocanthus, Kalmia, Scotch broom....

== 19th and 20th centuries ==
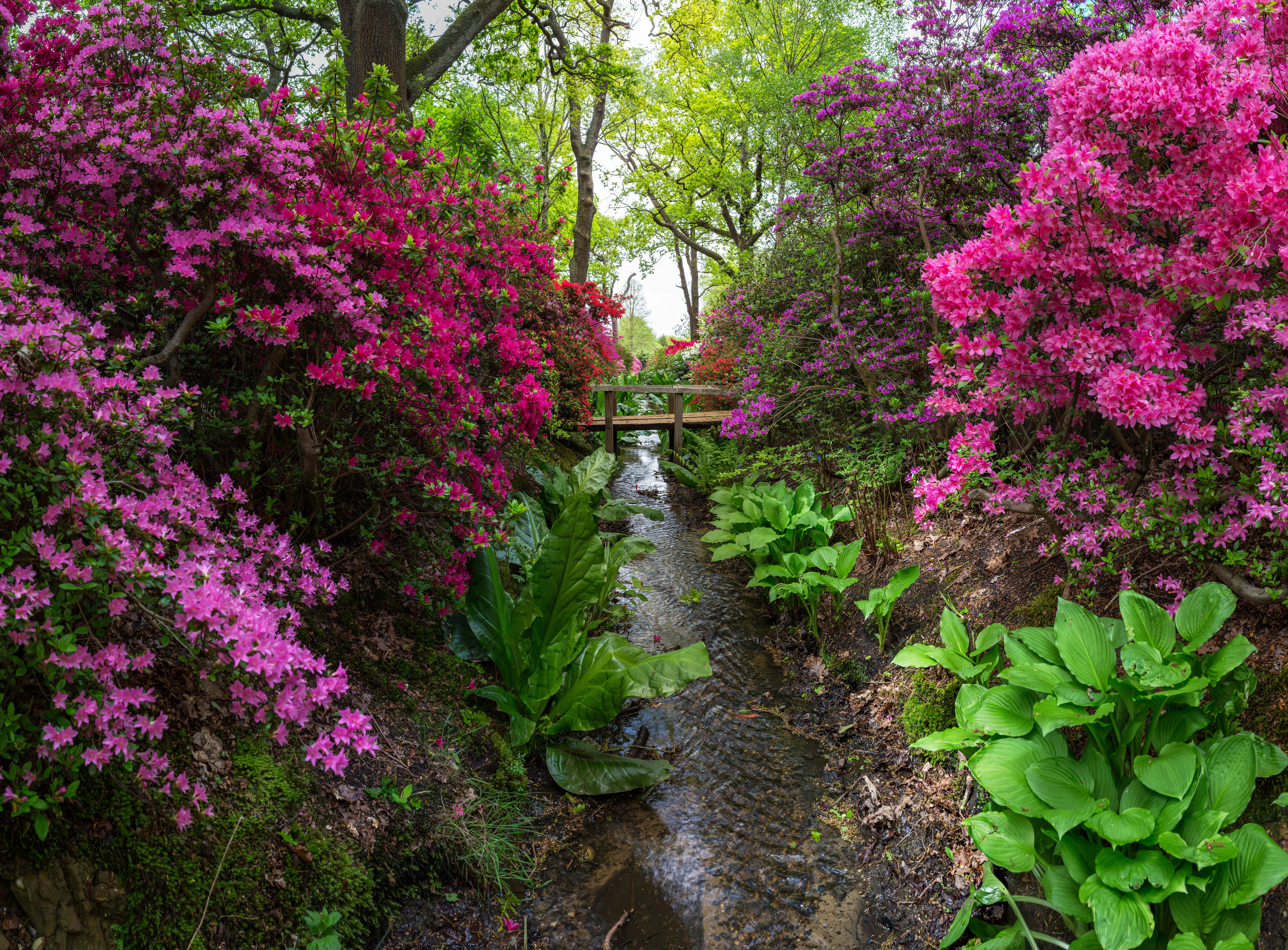
Stream in the Isabella Plantation, Richmond Park, near London

The rhododendrons from Europe and America known in England by 1800 were "pale-pink and mauve" in flower, and the arrival from India in the 1820s of a large species with "brilliant scarlet" flowers began a phase of plant collecting in the Himalayas and adjacent regions, also covering many other types of plants, that would last over a century. The three-year expedition to the Himalayas by Sir Joseph Dalton Hooker, later Director of the Royal Botanic Gardens, Kew, in 1847–50 had a rapid impact on large English gardens, beginning the "rhododendron garden". The new Asian plants were generally easier to grow successfully in northern Europe than the American arrivals of the previous century, and tended to replace them.

One species, rhododendron ponticum, is now all too prominent in Britain, Ireland and New Zealand as a problematic invasive plant. It is native to western Spain and Portugal, from where the British stock seems to have come, as well as north-eastern Turkey. It was first introduced to England in 1763 by the Loddiges family of nurserymen, but initially it was thought it needed the same damp conditions as the American species. By the 19th century it was realized that this was not the case, and the species began to thrive. By the 1840s landowners were spreading the seeds in woodland to create game coverts.

Another gardening form that fed into the woodland garden in the 19th century was the arboretum and its specialized sub-type of the pinetum, specimen collections of trees in general, but mostly exotic, and of conifers. Various schemes for arranging these rose and fell in fashion, and were also used for woodland gardens: by botanical groups, by geographical origin, by size and shape, and finally and most popularly, by colour. Many woodland gardens set out to replicate as far as possible the scenery of exotically remote and distant landscapes, mostly Asian, which their owners and designers often knew only from books.

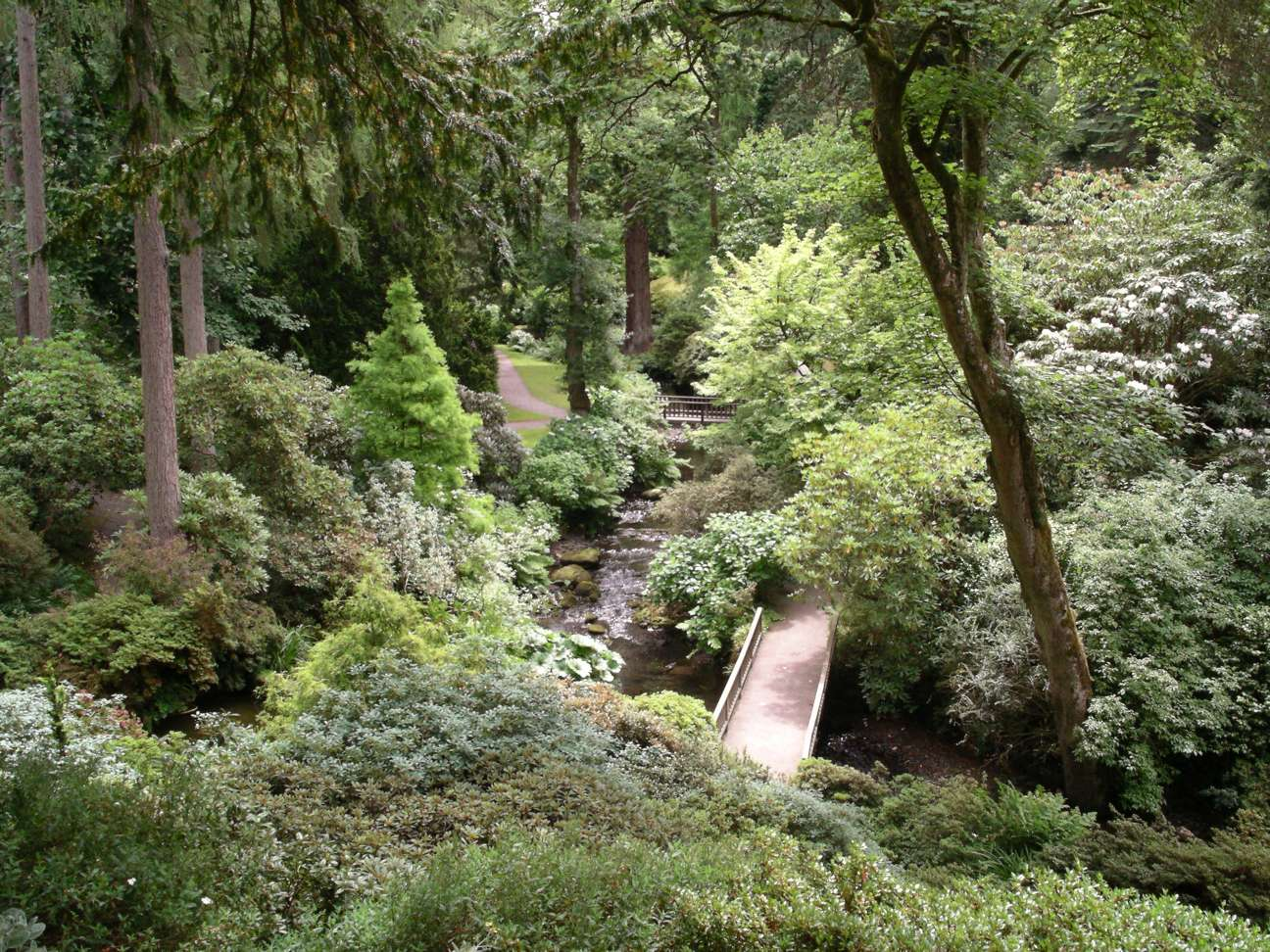
Bodnant Garden, Wales

Woodland gardens began to become a particular focus of gardening attention from the publication in 1870 of The Wild Garden by the opinionated gardener and writer William Robinson. In his "Preface" to the 1881 edition, Robinson explains that this essentially means "the placing of perfectly hardy exotic plants in places and under conditions where they will become established and take care of themselves". For woodland gardens Robinson's influence meant especially the mass planting of bulbs and other flowers, under and in front of deciduous trees and shrubs, which Robinson himself practised on an epic scale in his own garden at Gravetye Manor, bought in 1885.

A second crucial influence from the years around 1900 was the opening up of south-west China, especially Yunnan, and parts of the Himalayan foothills to European plant collectors, including George Forrest and Ernest Henry Wilson. These regions had a large number of flowering shrubs and trees that grew well in temperate climates, and often preferred acid soils that were little use for agriculture. Woodland gardens work well, arguably best of all, on sites with sharp but small contouring; the original habitat of most of the waves of new Asian plants was steep valleys or hillsides.

The steep garden at Cragside in Northumberland, created from the 1860s until about 1880, "may be regarded as the pioneering example" of this type of woodland garden, copied by several other gardens in the next three decades. The very large areas of garden developed by the rich in the early 20th century therefore used relatively cheap land, that was often already woodland. Some woodland gardens, like Sheffield Park Garden in East Sussex, took over a park laid out in the 18th-century English landscape garden style, in that case worked on by both Capability Brown and Humphry Repton. They also needed fewer gardeners per acre than intensive formal Victorian plantings. The style spread from the rich to the comfortably-off suburban middle-class. According to Charles Quest-Ritson, "The William Robinson style of woodland garden, colourfully planted with exotic shrubs and herbaceous plants, dominated English horticulture from 1910 to 1960".

After World War I new trends appeared in woodland garden design. Eric Savill (1895–1980) designed both the Savill Garden and the Valley Gardens in Windsor Great Park in a "new style in which glades and vistas became the major means of organizing the composition, and in which colour massing was downplayed", at least in the former.

=== The Japanese garden ===
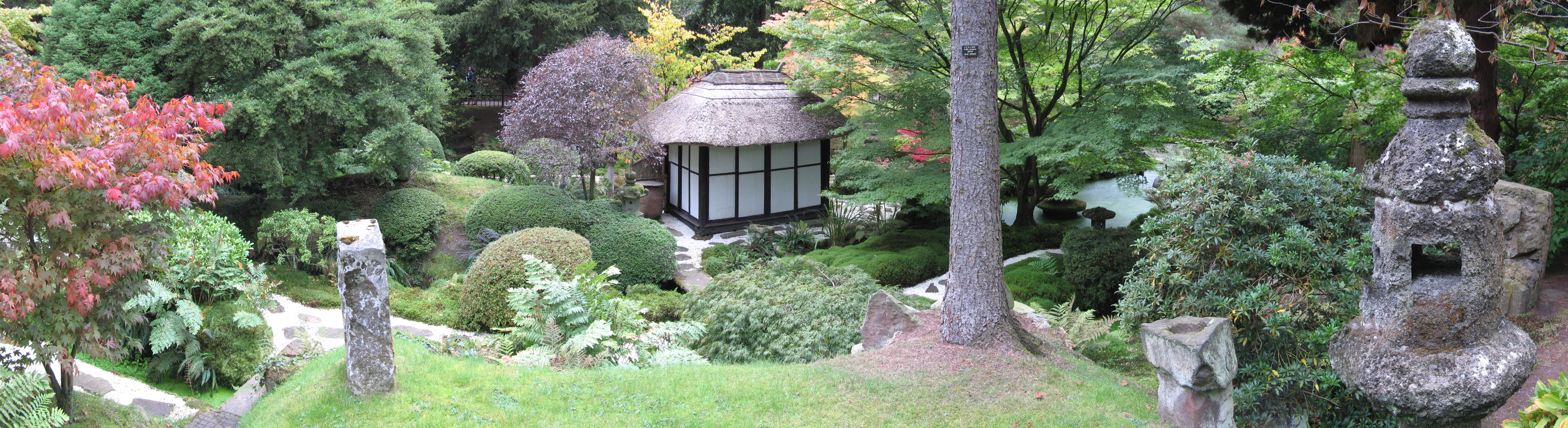
Japanese Garden in the Tatton Park Gardens, England, late September.

Another influence in the years around 1900 was the Japanese garden, whose distinct aesthetic was promoted in the West by Josiah Conder's Landscape Gardening in Japan (Kelly & Walsh, 1893). Conder was a British architect who had worked for the Japanese government and other clients in Japan from 1877 until his death. The book was published when the general trend of Japonisme, or Japanese influence in the arts of the West, was already well-established, and sparked the first Japanese gardens in the West. A second edition was required in 1912.

The traditional Japanese styles for larger gardens had long had many similarities with the Western woodland garden as it had by then developed. Initially Japanese gardens in the West were mostly sections of large private gardens, but as the style grew in popularity, many Japanese gardens were, and continue to be, added to public parks and gardens, and Japanese plants and styles spread into the wider Western garden. The Japanese had been breeding garden plants for centuries, and most imports to the West were garden varieties, though the plant collectors still made some useful finds in the wild.
