= Parco Burcina Natural Reserve =

Coordinates: 45.5817°N 8.0103°E

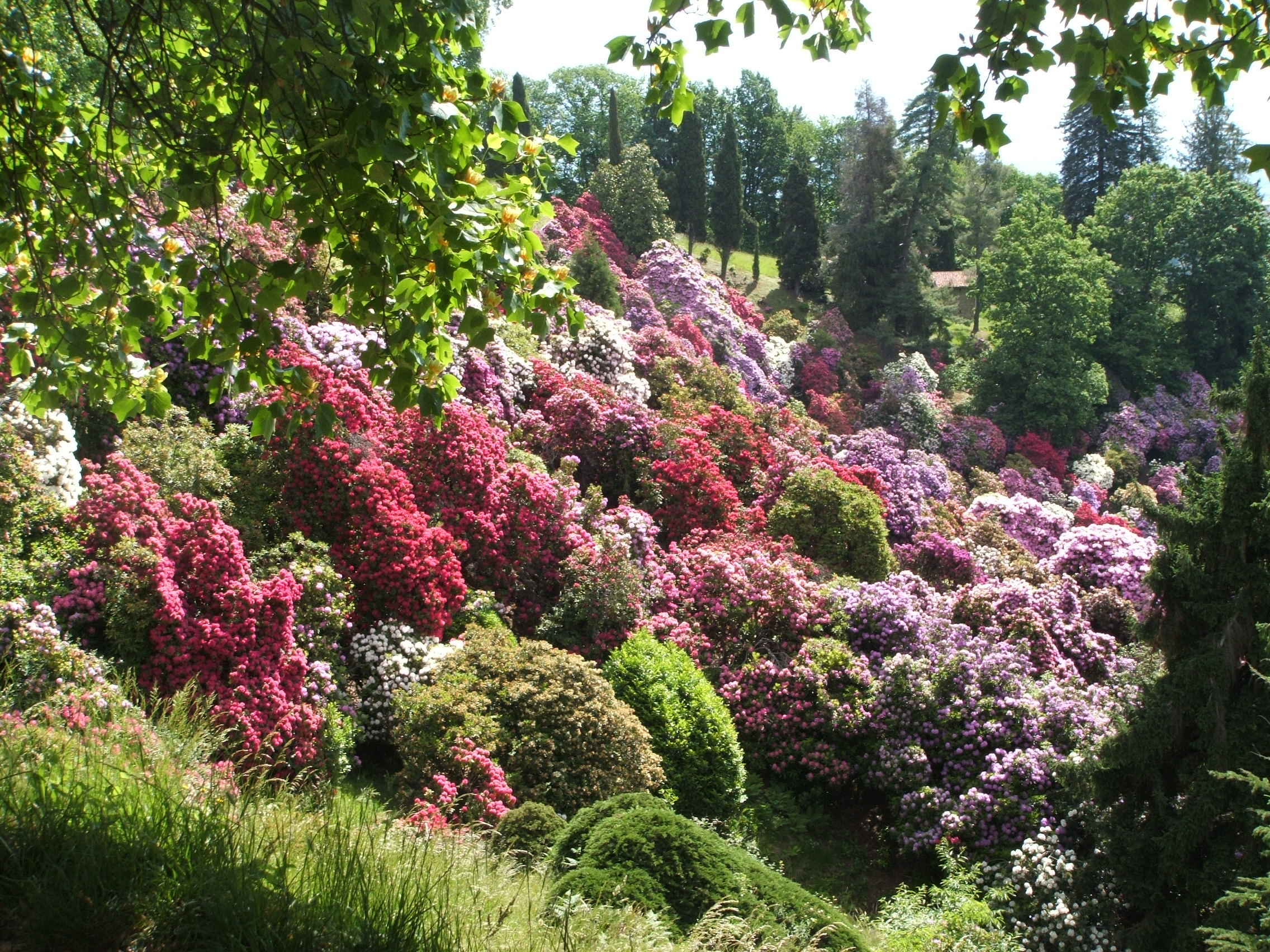
Rhododendrons

The Burcina Park “Felice Piacenza” Nature Reserve is a protected, wooded, about 57 hectares wide area. It was established in 1980 with a law of the Piedmont Region Government. It is located within the municipalities of Pollone and Biella. The Municipality of Biella owns almost three quarters of the whole surface.

The difference in altitude varies from 570 to 829 meters above sea level.

The reserve is situated on the Burcina hill, or bric (as locally called). It protects the natural, environmental and landscape characteristics of the area. More specifically, it supports and promotes scientific, cultural and educational activities, also involving schools.

== Geography ==
The Burcina is a woody hill crossed by the border between the Municipality of Pollone and the Municipality of Biella. Its north-eastern slopes belong to the basin of the stream Oropa, while the south-western ones, where the park is situated, are in the area of the stream Oremo. A pass at 730 m a.s.l. connects the Bric with the rest of the Biellese Alps.

Considering its quite isolated position, the Burcina is well recognizable within the area.

== Archaeology ==
Some findings in the area of the park attest the presence of Homo sapiens about 35.000 years ago. On the Burcina hill there is also evidence of a protohistoric establishment dating back to the Bronze Age and the Iron Age.

== Historic notes ==
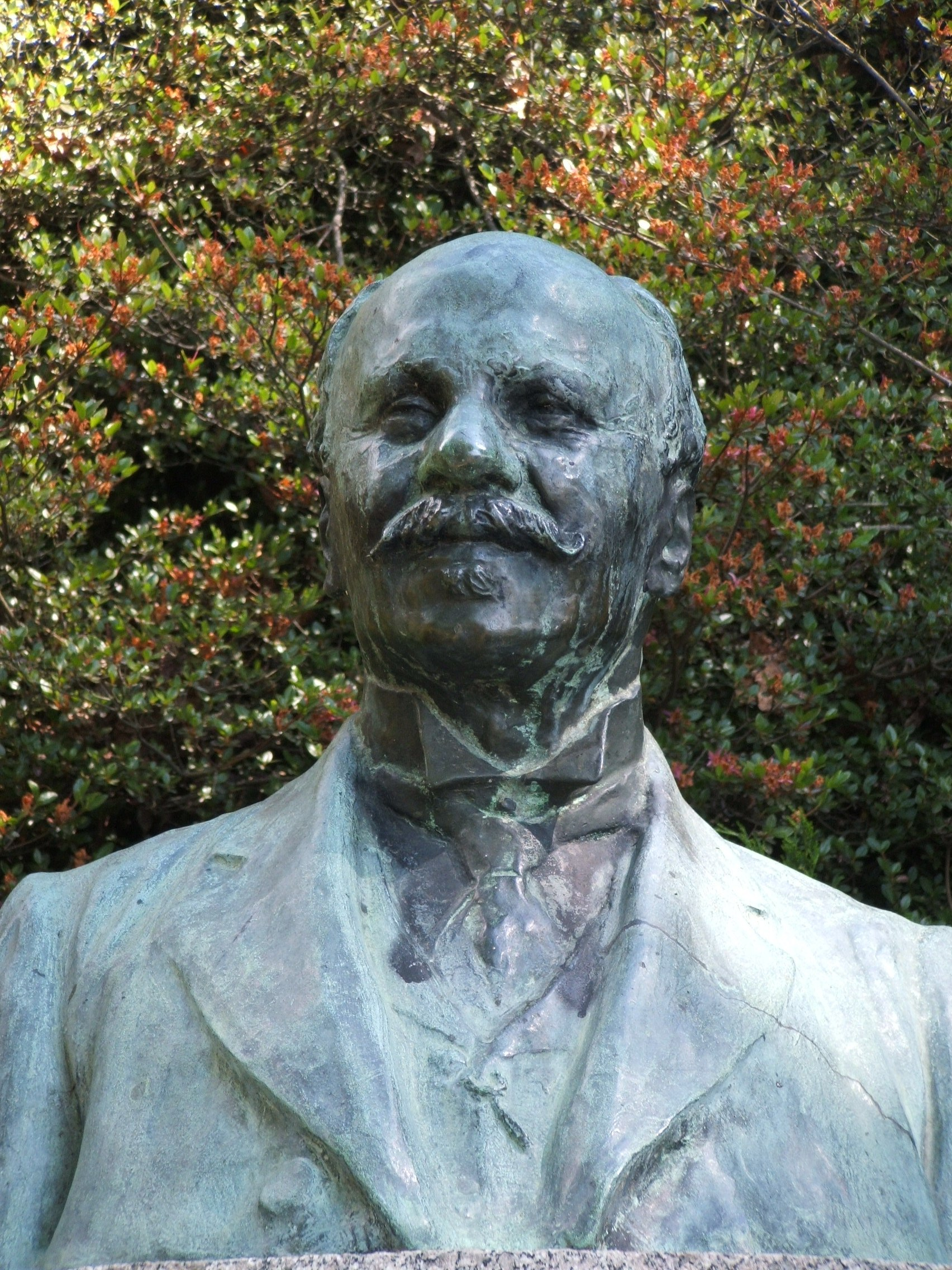
Statue of Felice Piacenza

Built in imitation of nature, the park can be reached through the main roads leading to Biella.

It is dedicated to Felice Piacenza, main creator of the green area and son of Giovanni Piacenza, who bought it. Giovanni Piacenza was an industrialist in the wool sector, born in Pollone. In the first half of the 19th century, he decided to transform the Burcina hill into a park drawing inspiration from the style of the English landscape garden, that had been in fashion in England since the 18th century, with woodland garden sections.

The first exotic plants (mainly giant sequoias) were planted in the lower part of the hill where, together with the first paths, a small, still existing, lake with fountains was created in 1848.

The park was then extended by Felice Piacenza, who dedicated more than fifty years of his life to this work. He realized a spectacular valley of rhododendrons, several paths and walkways and he planted several exotic species of plants.

The park was acquired by the Municipality of Biella in 1934. In the second postwar period it was modified with the opening of a new entry with o bridge over the brook Vandorba, designed by architect Pietro Porcinai. A bronze bust portraying Felice Piacenza, made by sculptor Leonardo Bistolfi, was placed in the park. In 1959 some archaeological evidence was found in the park, such as some adzes and a bronze jug.

== Valley of rhododendrons, imitation of nature ==
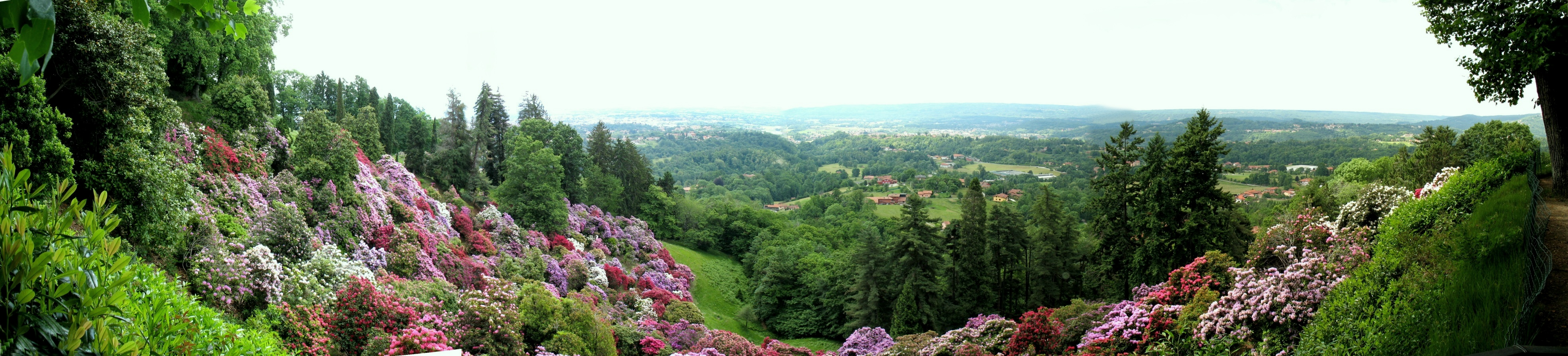
The valley of rhododendrons

The park has three foot entrances situated in the lower, middle and higher parts. It is known worldwide for its extraordinary valley of rhododendrons, covering two of the fifty-seven hectares of the park, that in the middle of May offers a unique floral display.

== The garden park ==
The wood is the natural background of the park, whose top can be reached by means of a road leading to the Martini Tower. The garden was designed as informal in order to enhance its spectacular, natural features. The plants are only apparently organized in a random order, with the aim of imitating what happens in nature. The internal woods are combined with meadows and clearings, while huge trees raise isolated and majestic.

The exotic species have been integrated into the local flora, that includes the typical broadleaved plants of the Mediterranean area:

- Beech
- Chestnut
- Maple
- Fraxinus
- Oak
- Prunus avium
- Birch

== Fauna ==
The Burcina Park is also interesting for its fauna, especially for birdwatchers.

Mammals living in the park are:

- Tree squirrel
- Hazel dormouse
- Common vole
- European hedgehog
- Red fox
- European badger
- Hare

Birds migratory or nonmigratory:

- House sparrow
- European robin
- Eurasian blackcap
- Tit
- Common chaffinch
- Common blackbird
- Emberizidae
- Eurasian sparrowhawk
- Hawfinch
- European pied flycatcher
- Eurasian magpie
- Eurasian jay
- Carrion crow
- Rook

== Gallery ==
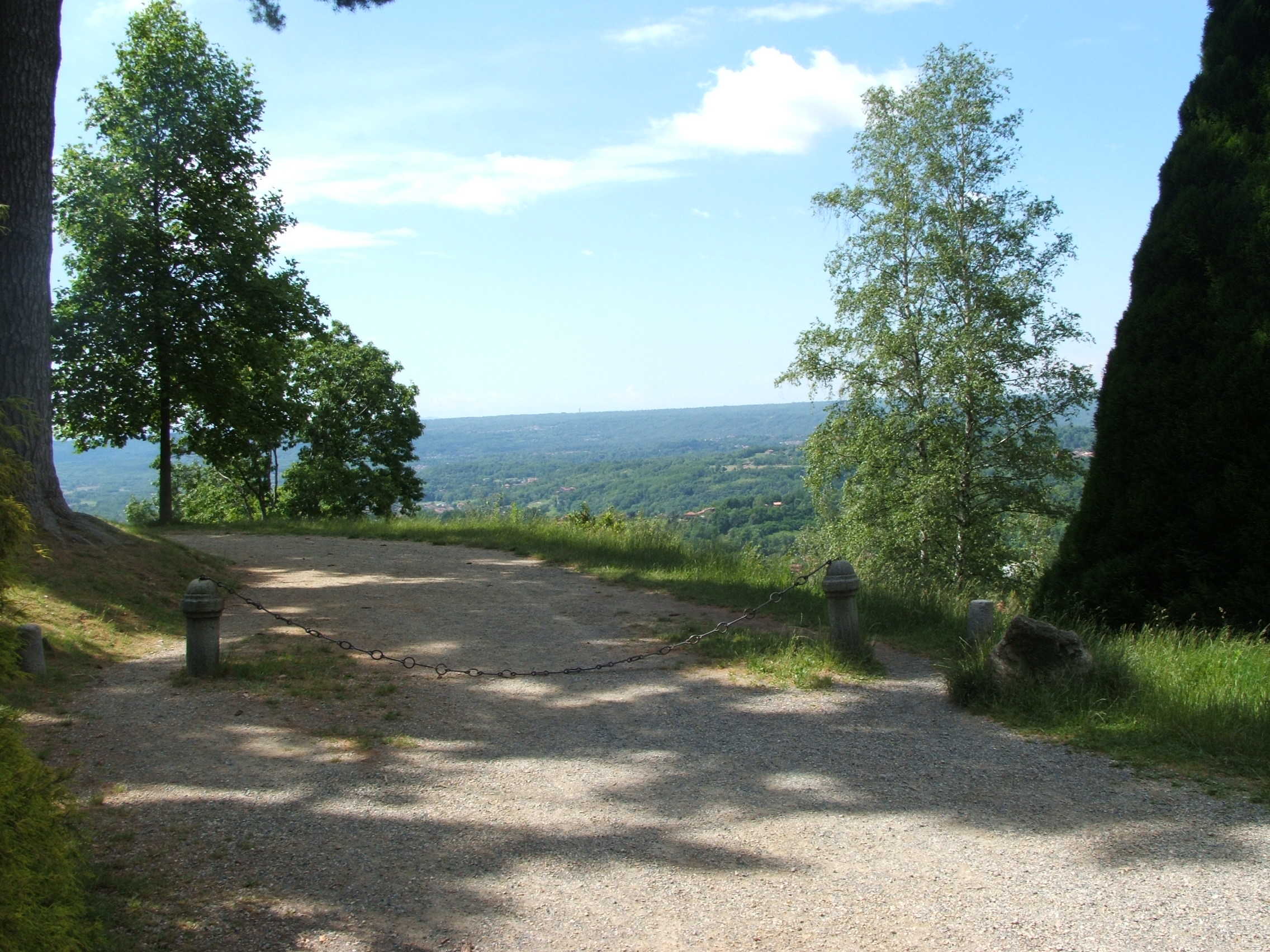
Burcina Park – entrance to the valley of rhododendrons. In the background the morainic hill of Serra (Ivrea)

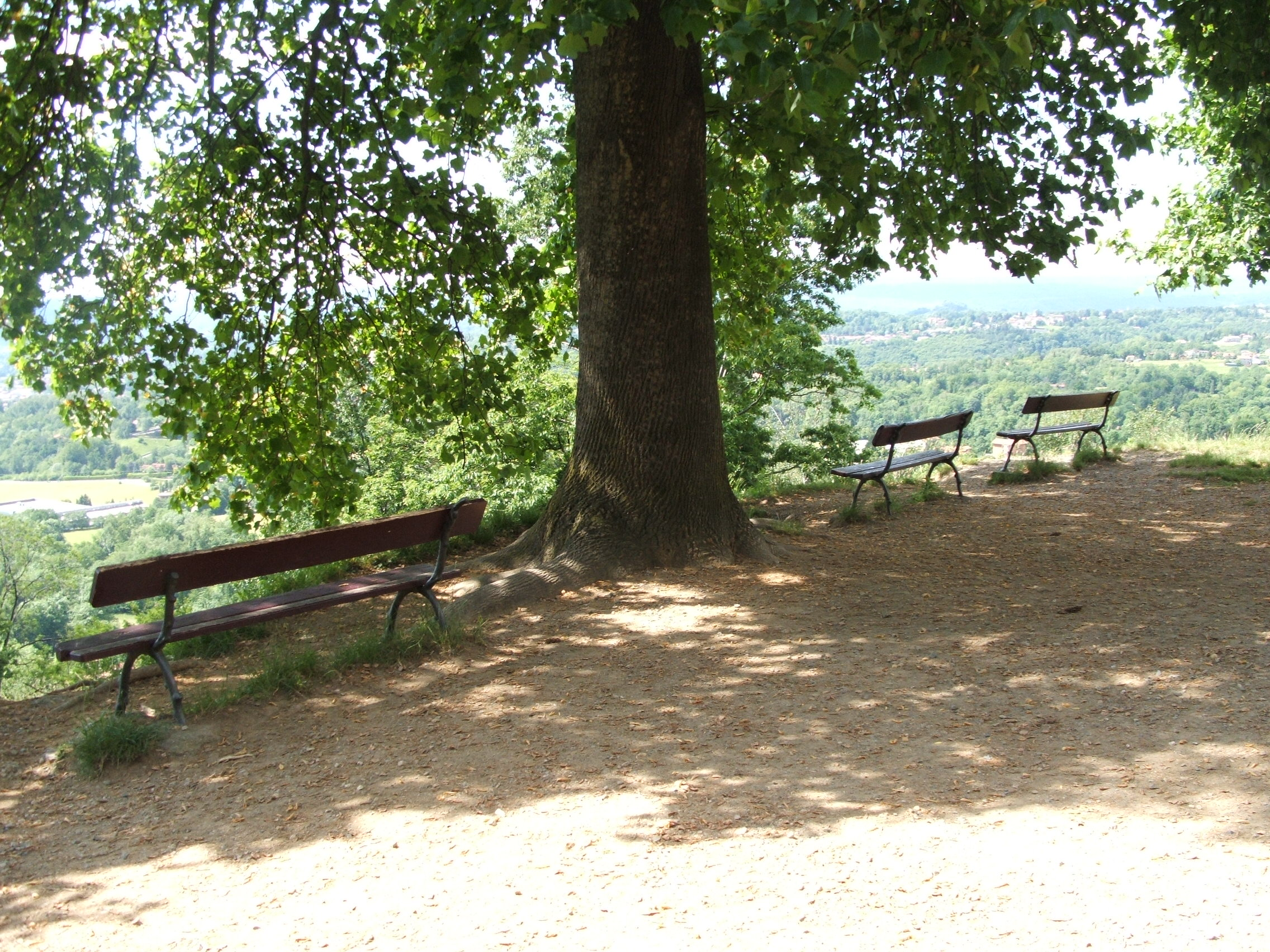
Panoramic point

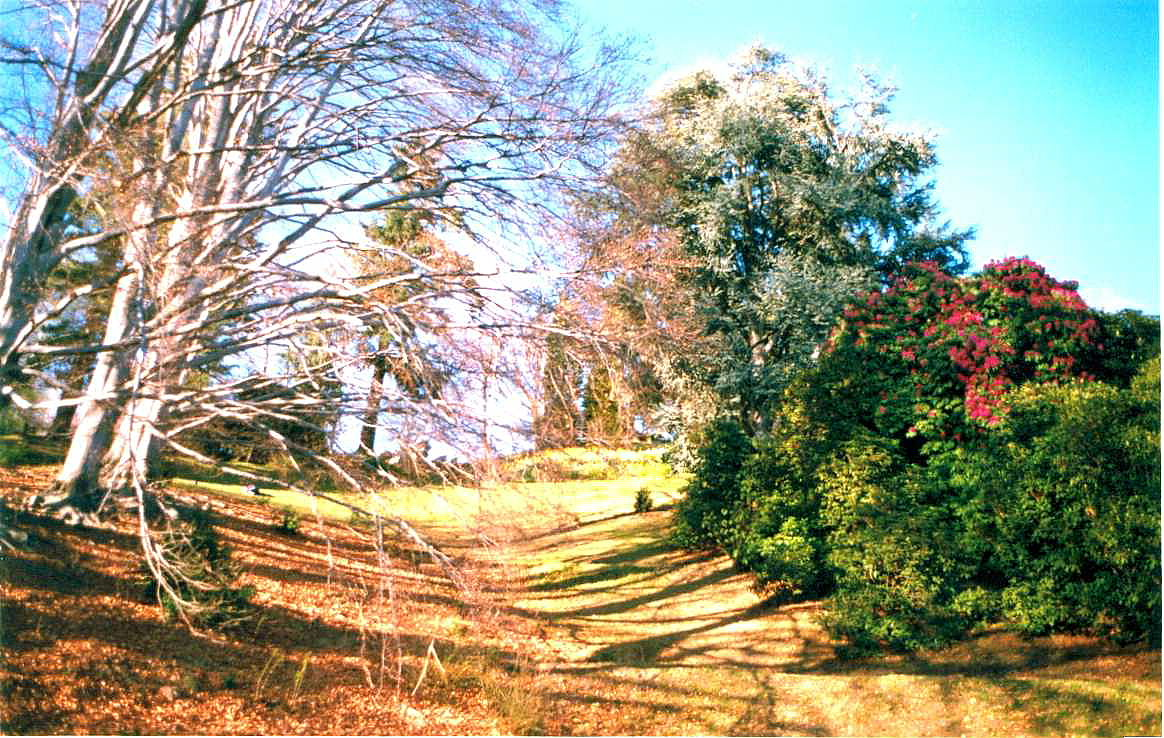
The park

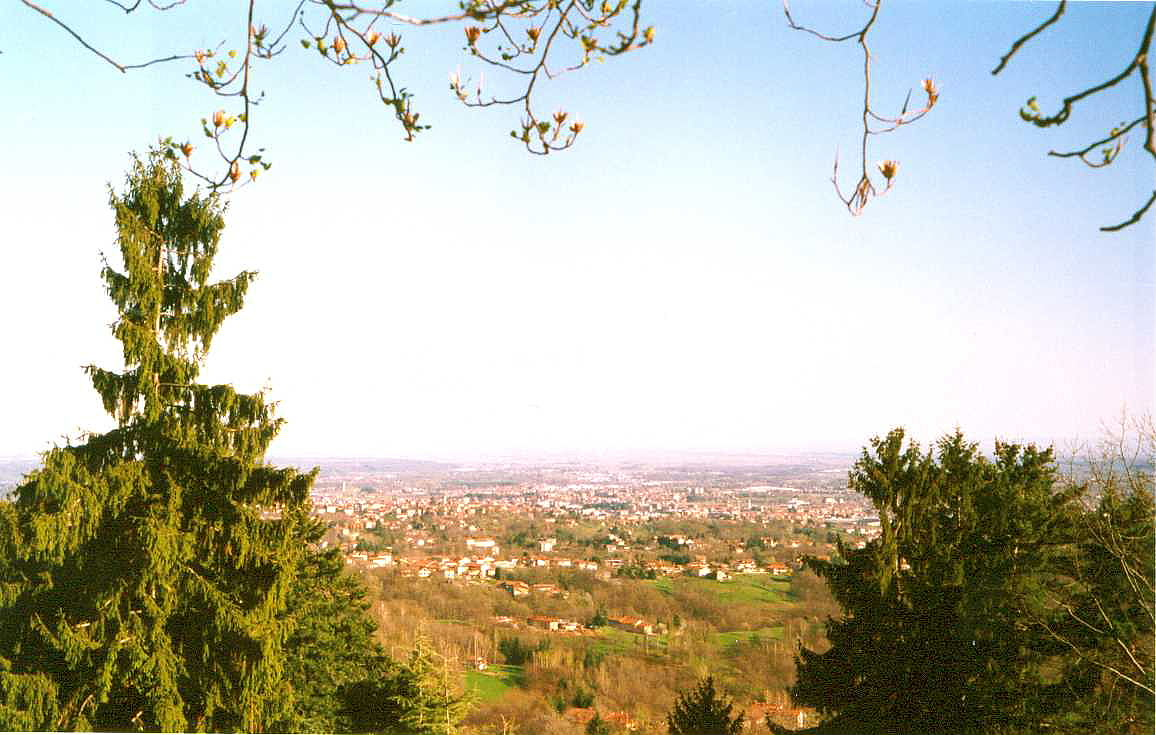
Biella from the Burcina

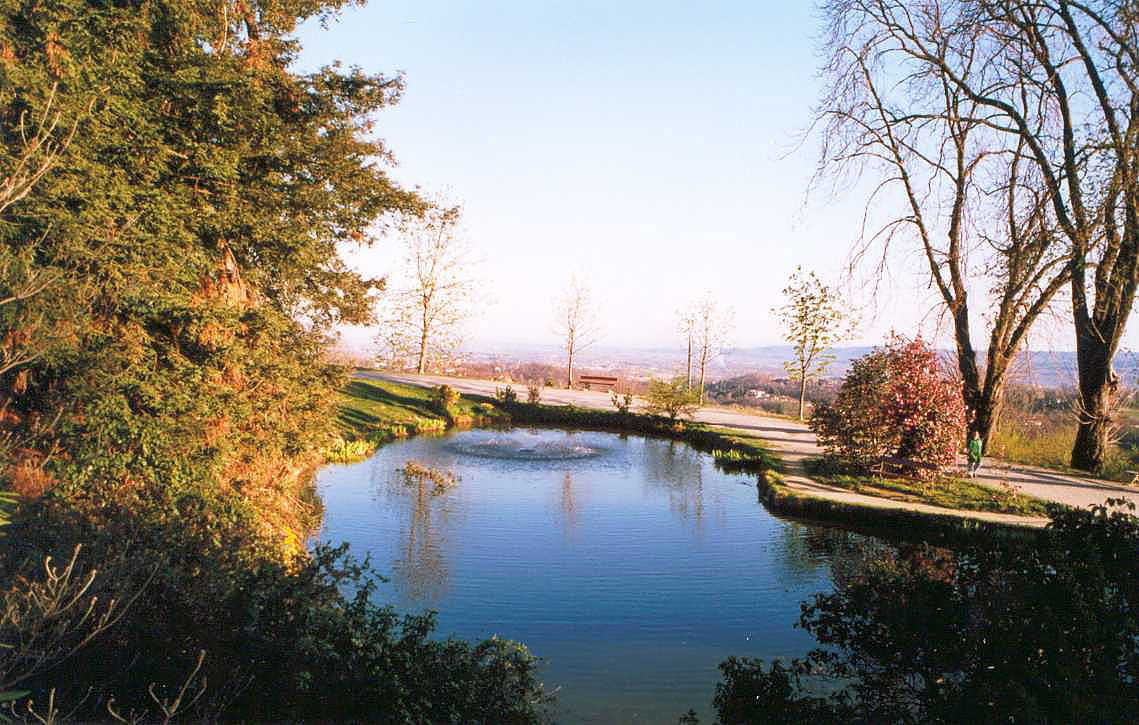
One of the lakes

== See also ==
- CoEur - In the heart of European paths
- Path of Saint Charles
