= DZST (Manila) =

- Manila; Philippines
- Broadcast area: Metro Manila
- Frequency: 860 kHz

Programming
- Format: College radio

Ownership
- Owner: University of Santo Tomas

History
- First air date: 1950; 76 years ago
- Last air date: 1969; 57 years ago
- Call sign meaning: University of Santo Tomas or Saint Thomas Aquinas

DZST (860 kHz) was an AM radio station owned and operated by the University of Santo Tomas in the Philippines. It also served both as a campus station and as a Catholic station. In 1969, the station went off the air.

The station was housed in the Main Building of the campus and broadcast from 1950 to 1969. The frequency was later reassigned to the newly-established Radyo Veritas as its inaugural frequency, prior to the realignment of AM broadcast frequencies under the 9kHz spacing rule.

== UST Tiger Radio ==
UST Tiger Radio
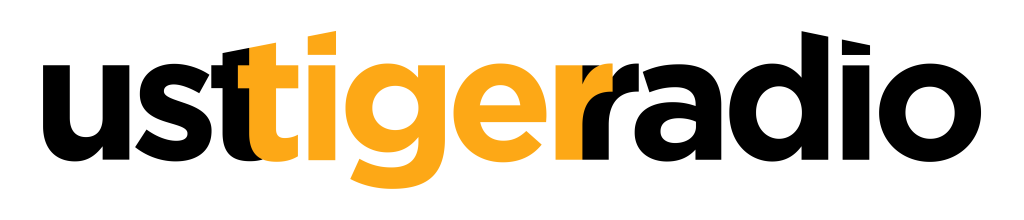
- Manila; Philippines
- Broadcast area: Pasay
- Branding: ustigeradio

Programming
- Format: College radio, Indie, Hit Radio

Ownership
- Owner: University of Santo Tomas
- Operator: Tiger Media Network

Links
- Webcast: Listen Live via Mixlr

Tiger Media Network (TMN) was established in 2018 by the university's Communications Bureau, serving as the successor of DZST.

TMN focuses on production and distribution of content by and for the Thomasian community. The network is operated by student volunteers who are passionate about multimedia storytelling, providing a platform for future media professionals to develop their skills.

TMN operates two main stations serving the entire campus: Tiger TV and Tiger Radio. TMN would later become its own entity as the Tomasian Cable Television (TOMCAT).

Tiger Radio was established in the late 2000s; it would later become part of TMN upon the 2018 formation. It serves as the official campus station of the UST community, which was formerly served by the defunct DZST.

UST Tiger Radio originates from the Communications Bureau's offices on the 12th floor of the Buenaventura Garcia Paredes, O.P. building within the university campus. The station operates online via web streaming from Monday to Friday, except during semester breaks.

== See also ==
- Timeline of the History of the University of Santo Tomas
