= Pollone =

- Comune
- Comune di Pollone
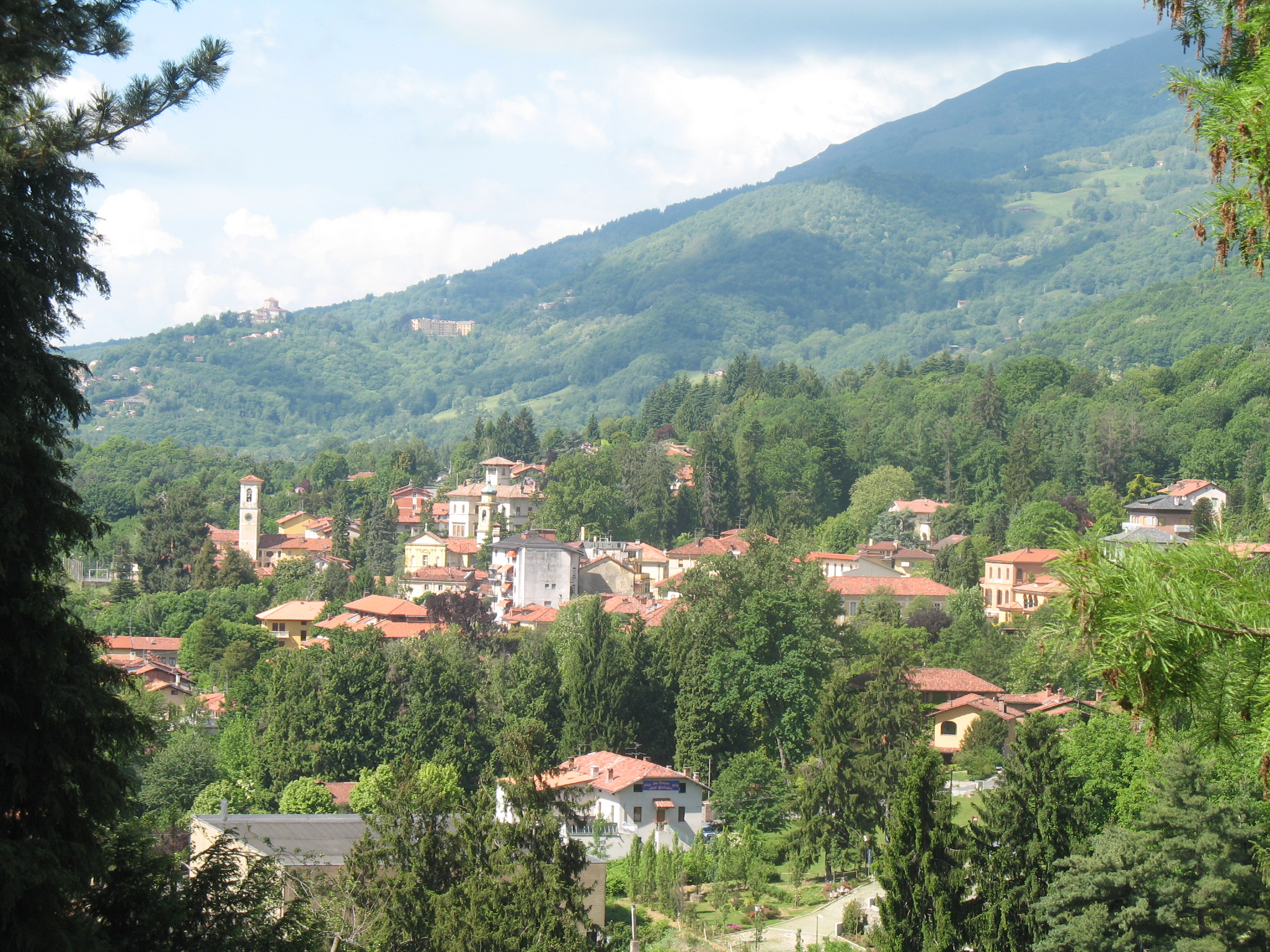
- View of Pollone

- Location within Italy Location within Piedmont
- Coordinates: 45°34′N 7°59′E
- Country: Italy
- Region: Piedmont
- Province: Biella (BI)

Government
  - Mayor: Vincenzo Ferraris

Area
  - Total: 16.22 km^{2} (6.26 sq mi)
- Elevation: 630 m (2,070 ft)

Population (31 December 2010)
  - Total: 2,192
  - Density: 135.1/km^{2} (350.0/sq mi)
- Demonym: Pollonesi
- Time zone: UTC+1 (CET)
  - Summer (DST): UTC+2 (CEST)
- Postal code: 13057
- Dialing code: 015
- Website: Official website

Pollone is a comune (municipality) in the Province of Biella in the Italian region Piedmont, located about 60 kilometres (37 mi) northeast of Turin and about 7 kilometres (4 mi) west of Biella. Pollone borders the following municipalities: Biella, Fontainemore, Lillianes, Occhieppo Superiore, Sordevolo.

== Economy ==
- Fratelli Piacenza

== See also ==
- Glomeris primordialis
- International Frassati Path of Pollone
- Parco Burcina Natural Reserve
