= Roque Ruaño =

Spanish civil engineer

Roque Ruaño Garrido
- Born: 16 August 1877; Palencia, Spain
- Died: 1 March 1935 (aged 57); Manila, Philippine Islands
- Engineering career
- Discipline: Civil
- Institutions: Colegio de San Juan de Letran (Rector, 1927–1930); UST Faculty of Engineering (Dean, 1930–1935); UST Faculty of Engineering (Regent)
- Significant design: UST Main Building; Dominican Residences in Baguio; Dominican Residences in Lingayen, Pangasinan
- Awards: Doctorate in Civil Engineering (UST)

Roque Ruaño Garrido, O.P. (August 16, 1877 – March 5, 1935) was a Spanish priest and civil engineer. He was known after he drew up plans for University of Santo Tomas (UST) Main Building, the first earthquake-shock resistant building in Asia, which was constructed at the Sulucan property of the Dominican order in city of Manila.

== Early life ==
Born on August 16, 1877, in Palencia, Spain, Fr. Roque Ruaño submitted himself in faith to the Dominican Order in 1894. He first arrived in the Philippines on July 21, 1904. Upon arrival in the country, he served his first few years in the Colegio de San Juan de Letran as Father Rector. He transferred to the University of Santo Tomas and was able to obtain a Doctorate in Civil Engineering.

== Significant design ==
As evidence of his work, Ruaño built the Dominican Residences in Baguio and Lingayen, Pangasinan. Among his most notable projects is the UST Main Building, which is recognised as the first earthquake-shock resistant building in the Philippines. Over the years, the building has withstood significant historical events, including World War II, Marcos dictatorial regime, and the country's revival of democracy. Recent studies indicate that the design of the main building is consistent with modern building code and regulation.

== Life at the University of Santo Tomas ==
Ruaño was also a professor in the then-School of Civil Engineering of the University of Santo Tomas. The subjects he handled were mineralogy, geology, and harbors and lighthouses. He also became the Dean of the college and Regent from 1930 to 1935. He was also a representative in various international conventions in Tokyo (1926), Ravenna (1931) and London (1932).

== Death and honor ==
Ruaño died on March 1, 1935, due to heart failure. In honor of his achievements, an edifice was named after him. It was in the corner of España Boulevard and A. H. Lacson Avenue (formerly Gov. Forbes), at first it was called the Architecture and Engineering Building. In its inauguration in 1950, the site was named after him, the Roque Ruaño Building which houses the students and faculty members of the Faculty of Engineering and formerly, the College of Information and Computing Sciences before it moved to the Frassati Building across España Boulevard.

== See also ==
- University of Santo Tomas (UST)
- UST Faculty of Engineering
- UST Main Building
- Civil engineering
- Order of Preachers

Academic offices
Preceded by Jesus Andres Villaverde	Rector Magnificus of Colegio de San Juan de Letran; 1927–1930	Succeeded by Juan Ylla
Preceded by Don Santiago Artiaga	Dean of the UST Faculty of Engineering; 1930–1935	Succeeded by Alberto Guevara y Sanchez
