= International Frassati Path of Pollone =

Hiking path in Piedmont, Italy

- Location: Pollone, Piedmont, Italy
- Established: 2000 (Jubilee Year)
- Use: Hiking, pilgrimage
- Difficulty: Moderate
- Sights: Poggio Frassati, Sanctuary of Oropa, Monte Mucrone
- Website: Official website

The International Frassati Path of Pollone is one of the paths devoted to the Blessed Pier Giorgio Frassati in Piedmont.

It begins in the village of Pollone, the native place of the Frassati family, where the Blessed Pier Giorgio went on vacation, and continues as far as the altar on Monte Muanda.

== History ==
For the 2000 Jubilee, the path that the Blessed Pier Giorgio Frassati walked through in order to reach the Sanctuary of Oropa, after starting from the family villa in Pollone, was inaugurated.

This track climbs on the Monte Muanda as far as the feet of the Monte Mucrone, where, on a hillock (called Poggio Frassati) an altar devoted to the Blessed has been built.

Along the way, there are panels with quotations of Frassati's thoughts.

== See also ==
- Pier Giorgio Frassati
- CoEur - In the heart of European paths
- Path of Saint Charles
