= University of Santo Tomas Publishing House =

Philippine university publishing house

- Parent company: University of Santo Tomas
- Status: Active
- Founded: 1593 (UST Press); 1996 (UST Publishing House)
- Founder: Order of Preachers
- Country of origin: Philippines
- Headquarters location: Sampaloc, Manila
- Distribution: Nationwide
- Key people: Benedict B. Parfan, Director; Paul A. Castillo, Deputy Director
- Publication types: Books, researches, monographs, textbooks, artworks and other educational printed materials
- Nonfiction topics: Religious studies, humanities and social sciences
- Fiction genres: Contemporary Philippine literature
- Official website: www.ust.edu.ph/administrative-offices/publishing-house/

University of Santo Tomas Publishing House (USTPH) is a Filipino academic and literary publishing house. USTPH, in its current form, was established in 1996. It was inspired by the four-century-old UST Press, which was founded in 1593. USTPH, formerly the UST Press, is the oldest continuing press in Asia today. It is even older than the University of Santo Tomas, which was established in 1611.

== History ==
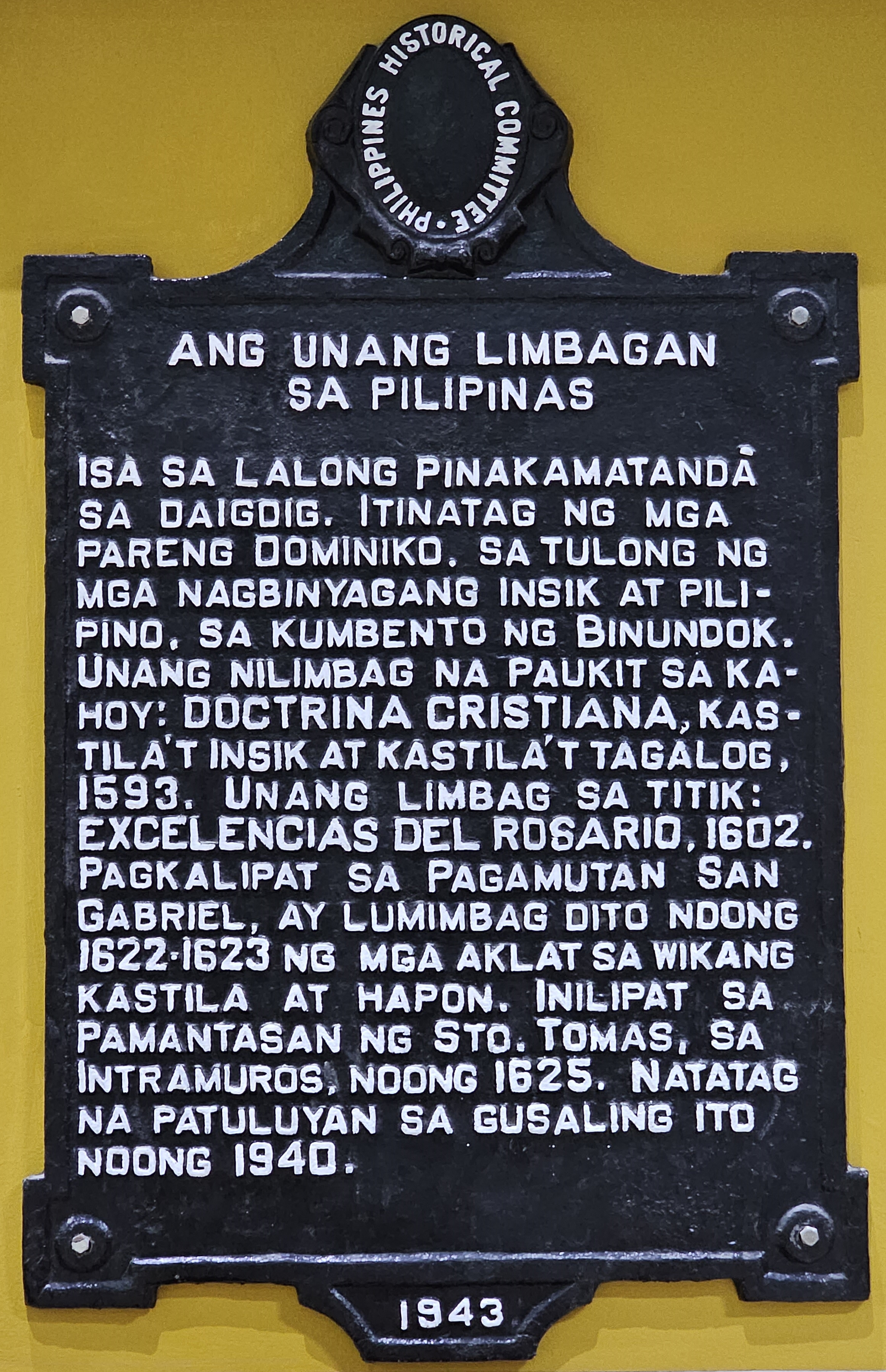
Historical marker installed in 1943 to commemorate the UST Press

- In 1593, the Dominicans pioneered printing in the Philippines by producing through the old technique of xylography, a wooden block printing press which was exhibited at the UST Museum of Arts and Sciences.
- In 1602, the Dominican Blancas de San Jose together with a Chinese convert in Binondo made molds, types and instruments needed for typography. Typographic printing in the Philippines was indigenous, not imported from other countries it was recognized by Wenceslao Retana as "the semi-invention" of the press in the country.
- In 1625, the press open up at the Colegio de Santo Tomás, soon became a university, and had since been known as the UST Press.
- In 1996, the UST Press was renamed UST Publishing House.
- Writer and literature professor Cristina Pantoja-Hidalgo was hired as director in 2010.

== Early Publications ==
- Doctrina Christiana - a catechism in Tagalog and Spanish. The first book published in the Philippines.
- Baybayin - ancient Tagalog alphabet
- Shih-Lu (Apologia de la Verdadera Religion) - a catechism for the Chinese in the Philippines
- Historia de la Provincia del Santo Rosario de Filipinas by Diego Aduarte - a book about the Dominican Missions in the Far East, which was widely considered to be the best printed book of the 17th century and the last of the incunabulas
- Flora en Filipinas - a classic book by Augustinian Manuel Blanco. It consists of four big volumes with 479 plates, half of them in splendid color lithographs (a copy of the colossal publishing project is preserved in the Rare Books Section of the UST Central Library).

== Present Publications ==
- scholarly books
- faculty researches
- monographs
- textbooks in all levels
- artworks and designs
- other educational printed materials
