= Buenaventura García de Paredes =

Dominican priest (1866-1936)

Buenaventura García de Paredes (17 Thomasian Martyrs)

Buenaventura García de Paredes (April 19, 1866 in Castañedo de Valdés – August 12, 1936) was a Spanish priest, martyr of the Spanish Civil War and Master of the Order of Preachers.

== Early biography ==
Paredes was born and baptized on April 19, 1866 in Castañedo de Valdés, near Luarca (Asturias). As a young boy he took care of his father’s sheep. Paredes' brother was a priest.

== Education ==
Paredes began his primary studies in his hometown and in a preceptory at the behest of the Dominican priest Esteban Sacrest, he entered the Apostolic School or the Minor Seminary of Corias (Asturias), where he continued his studies for two years, but his precarious health forced him to go home and rest. Later Paredes studied at the Apostolic School of Ocaña (Toledo) making his profession on August 31, 1884. Paredes studied philosophy at Ocaña, and theology at the convent of Santo Tomás at Ávila. After these initial studies he obtained his bachelor's degree in Civil Law from the University of Salamanca in 1891, the year of his ordination to the priesthood in Ávila on July 25. Later he continued his studies in Philosophy and Letters, in Valencia and Madrid receiving a doctorate in philosophy and letters in 1897 with a dissertation entitled Santo Tomás y la Estética moderna. Necesidad de restaurar el pensamiento estético del angélico doctor en la ciencia de lo bello. Paredes received a doctorate in Civil Law in 1898 with a dissertation entitled La Iglesia y el Estado en la Teoría jurídico-social de santo Tomás comparada con las Teorías modernas sobre el mismo asunto.

In 1899 Paredes became a university lector in Manila, and in 1900 he became Professor of Political and Administrative Law at the University of Santo Tomás in Manila. In 1901 Paredes took over the editorship of the Catholic Daily "Libertas" and defended the case of Bernardino Nozaleda, the Archbishop of Manila.

Paredes was elected Prior of Santo Tomás de Ávila (1901), Rector of the College of Santa María de Nieva (Segovia), and Prior de Ocaña (1910).

== Provincial ==
In 1910 Paredes was elected Provincial of the Dominican Province of Our Lady of the Rosary with residence in Manila. For seven years he developed a fruitful activity of service to the Province which was then the most numerous and the most extensive Province within the Order. He ceded some mission fields in China and Vietnam to other provinces. The House of the Province in Valencia was given up to begin the restoration of the Province of Aragon. He founded the Magazine «Misiones Dominicanas» and acquired new properties to build the new campus of the University of Santo Tomás in Manila. He founded the Apostolic School of La Mejorada, near Olmedo, Valladolid, and extended the presence of the Province to the United States (in Tangipahoa, and the Center of Studies at Rosaryville, New Orleans, (Louisiana), which was inaugurated in 1911).

In 1917 he took charge of the construction and was made superior of the Convent of the Rosary of Madrid (at Calle Conde de Peñalver) and for nine years, he dedicated himself to the ministry and the direction of souls.

== Master General ==
In 1926, Paredes was elected Master General of the Order. He prostrated on the floor to supplicate the Chapter Fathers to free him from this office, but seeing the insistence of the electors, he accepted the office in the end.

In 1927, Paredes purchased from the Italian government the ancient convent of Saints Dominic and Sixtus in Rome, returning it pleno iure to the Dominican Order. In this way Paredes put into action Cormier's plans for the Pontificium Institutum Internationale Angelicum, the future Pontifical University of Saint Thomas Aquinas, Angelicum to be established on that site. The monastery, which formerly had been established by Pope Pius V as a convent for Dominican nuns in 1575 had come into the possession of the Italian government in 1873 by virtue of the law of suppression of religious orders. Paredes celebrated the inaugural mass for the academic year 1928-1929 in the Church of Saints Dominic and Sixtus, and the solemn inaugural lecture was given by Reginald Garrigou-Lagrange. Paredes wrote various circulars and faithfully complied with the obligations of his office. In 1929, due to some problems and the precarious state of his health, he presented his resignation.

== Retirement and martyrdom ==
On retiring Paredes returned to Ocaña and was in Madrid in the middle of July 1936. Because of religious persecution in Spain between 1934 and 1937 Paredes had to seek refuge in various places in Spain, but maintained a great religious spirit and devotion to the Eucharist. He was convinced that only by confiding to the mercy of God can one conceive some hope during those chaotic situations. Paredes was detained on August 11 and brought to the checa «García de Paredes», and then to Fuencarral Madrid, where he was martyred by a firing squad on August 12. At a property called Valdesenderín del Encinar, they found a breviary and a rosary beside his cadaver.

== Sanctity ==
On October 28, 2007 Paredes was beatified by Pope Benedict XVI.

Preceded by Ludwig Theissling	Master General of the Dominican Order; 1926–1929	Succeeded by Martin Gillet
