= University of Santo Tomas Faculty of Engineering =

Engineering school of the University of Santo Tomas

- Former names: 1907: School of Civil Engineering
- Established: 18 May 1907
- Dean: Angelo R. Dela Cruz
- Regent: Roberto L. Luanzon, Jr.
- Students: 7,196 (as of 2011)
- Location: Roque Ruaño Building, Ruaño Drive, Sampaloc, Manila, Philippines
- Patron saint: Blessed Jordan of Saxony
- Colors: Gray
- Website: www.ust.edu.ph/engineering/

The University of Santo Tomas Faculty of Engineering, or UST-Eng, is the engineering school of the University of Santo Tomas, the oldest and the largest Catholic university in Manila, Philippines.

Established on May 18, 1907, the faculty is the first engineering school in the Philippines. It is proclaimed as a Center of Excellence in chemical engineering and as a Center of Development in civil engineering, electronics engineering, industrial engineering, mechanical engineering and electrical engineering by the Commission on Higher Education.

== History ==
The Engineering-Architecture Building, now known as Roque Ruaño Building, in 1950s.

Establishment of Degree Programs of UST Faculty of Engineering
1907	Civil Engineering
1930	Architecture; 1930–1938 under the Faculty
1934	Mining Engineering; Phased out in 1948
1934	Chemical Engineering
1940	Mechanical Engineering
1946	Electrical Engineering
1963	Electronics Engineering
1977	Industrial Engineering
2004	Computer Science; Information Technology; 2004–2014 under the Faculty
2006	Information Systems; 2004 as Information Management; 2006–2014 under the Faculty

The Faculty of Engineering of the University of Santo Tomas (UST) is the oldest engineering school in the Philippines. It was established on May 18, 1907, as School of Civil Engineering with one program offering leading to the degree of Master of Science in Civil Engineering (MSCE). From faculty records, it appears that it was only in 1912 when the earliest batch of students were conferred their MSCE degrees. The institution was actually patterned after the University of Havana in Cuba and was first set up at the second floor of the old UST building in Intramuros. Taking into consideration the pioneering works of the teaching staff and students, the college got its first taste of prestige as the government, under President Manuel L. Quezon gave her recognition on July 12, 1921.

After the formation of the Engineering's Students' Association in 1927, the first Engineering Student Council was organized the following year. Three years later, in 1930, the school established Architecture as its new program, with Rev. Fr. Roque Ruaño, O.P. as the new school dean. In 1931, UST Engineering included Plane and Spherical Trigonometry on its curriculum.

The number of students enrolling in Civil Engineering decreased in 1934. So as to compensate this, another program was offered in the college, Mining Engineering. This new program was placed under the Mining Department which was headed by Theodore Lawson. On the same year, a famous Dominican engineering alumnus, Maurico Andres, CE, became the provincial superior and vice grand chancellor of Dominicans in the Philippines. The college also introduced courses in Chemical Engineering, which were first placed under the Chemical Department of the College of Liberal Arts.

Eventually in 1938, the Department of Architecture became a separate college—School of Architecture and Fine Arts. With the addition of the other engineering disciplines, the School of Civil Engineering eventually became the Faculty of Engineering in 1940. The Department of Mechanical Engineering was also established on that year.

The university held classes up to 1941 but had to close when the Japanese turned its Sampaloc campus into a military camp during World War II. The Intramuros campus was burned down on February 8, 1944. On January 7, 1946, the university reopened at its present site in Sampaloc and the Faculty of Engineering was temporarily based in the UST Main Building. UST Engineering reopened with 300 students. Chemical Engineering accepted the first batch of women enrollees in the faculty. Electrical Engineering was offered on the same year to attract more students.

In 1948, Mining Engineering was phased out due to the decreasing number of students interested in mining.

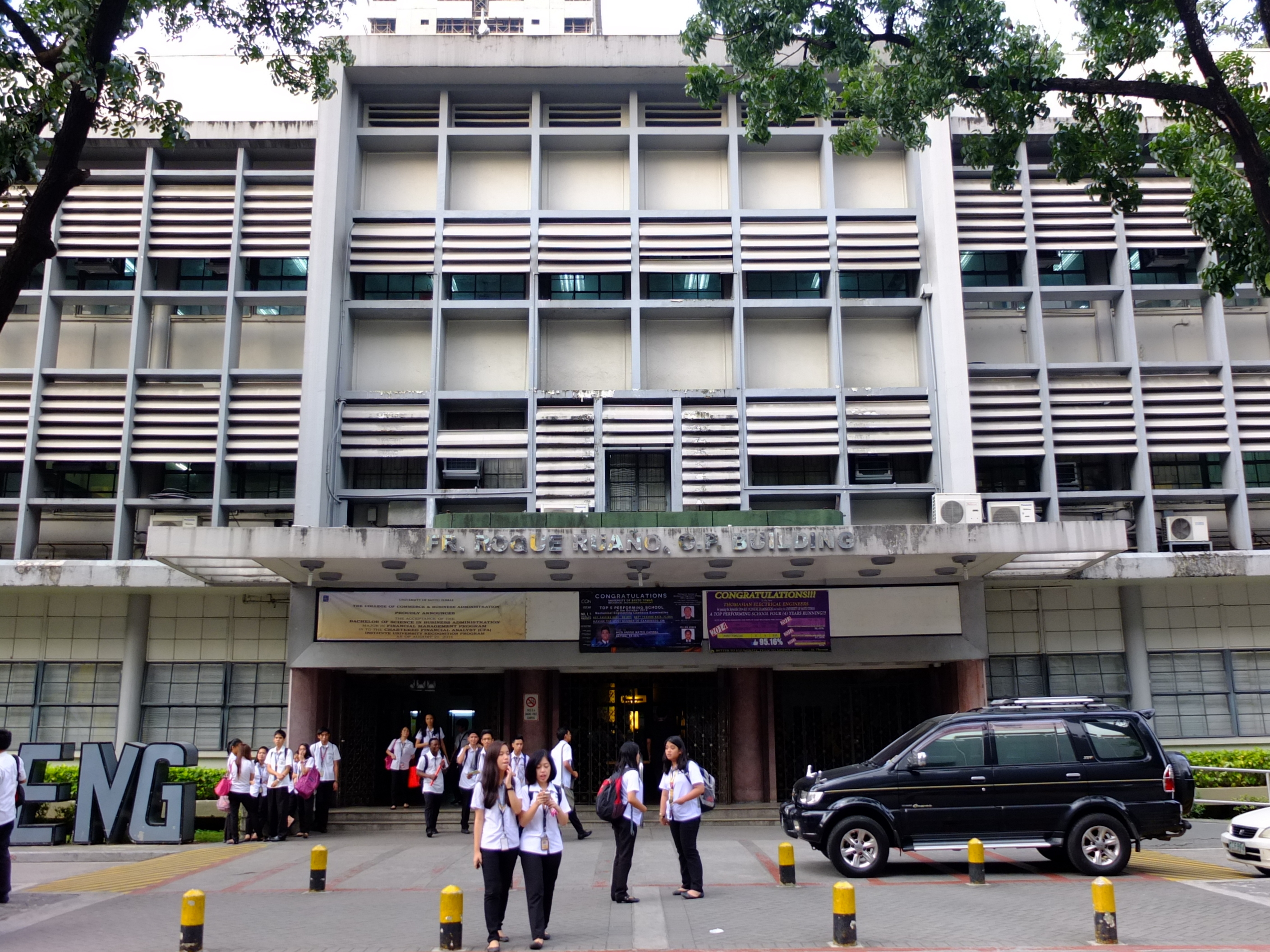
Roque Ruano Building

Things started to look good as the Faculty was given a new separate home in February 1950. The four-story, E-shaped building known as the Roque Ruaño Building, in honor of great civil engineer alumnus, Rev. Fr. Roque Ruaño, O.P. (Batch 1912) who is responsible for the construction of the UST Main Building. It housed not only the Faculty but included the College of Architecture and Fine Arts. On the same year, the Faculty produced the first women engineer: Purita Sarandi, Carmelita Reyes and Josefina Lamban, who graduated Magna cum laude.

From four-year course, in 1954, engineering course was extended to a five-year course to accommodate more subjects related to engineering. Electronics Engineering paved the way for a bachelor's degree in Electronics and Communications Engineering in 1963. The Institute of Technological Courses became part of the Faculty in 1972. Industrial Engineering is integrated into the college in 1977, with Dean Francisco G. Reyes as head. In 1979, the Engineering Sciences division that houses first and second year engineering students is formed to offer basic engineering-related subjects.

In 2003, College of Architecture and College of Fine Arts and Design vacated the Roque Ruaño Building, and replaced by Department of Information and Computer Studies.

Founded in 1999 as Institute of Computer Sciences under the College of Science, Information and Computer Studies was formally integrated to the Faculty of Engineering in 2004 due to its technically oriented character. However, in 2014, the department became a separate institute, and in 2021 it was elevated to a college, becoming the College of Information and Computing Sciences.

== Faculty of Engineering officials ==
Deans of University of Santo Tomas Faculty of Engineering
Name	Years of deanship
Don Ramón de Irureta-Goyena	1907–19??
Don Santiago Artiaga	19??–19??
Roque Ruaño	1930–1935
Alberto Guevara y Sanchez	1935–1942
Manuel Mañosa y Trounqued	1946–1950
Jose M. Mijares	1950–1951
Jose G. Cortez	1951–1954
Jose M. Mijares	1954–1956
Jose M. Inocencio	1956–1975
Francisco G. Reyes	1975–1981
Mariano M. Pangan	1981–1984
Alberto A. Laurito	1985–2000
Marilyn C. Mabini	2000–2006
Peter S. Lim	2006–2009
Josefin S. de Alban Jr.	2009–2012
Philipina A. Marcelo	2012–2022
Angelo R. Dela Cruz	2022–Present

=== Administrators ===
- Dean - Angelo R. Dela Cruz, PhD., PECE (Electronics Engineer)
- Assistant Dean - Cristina E. Tiangco, PhD. (Chemical Engineer)
- Regent - Rev. Fr. Roberto L. Luanzon Jr., O.P.
- Faculty Secretary - Ma. Luisa T. Asilo (Electronics Engineer)

=== Department chairs ===
- Civil Engineering - Rajiv Eldon E. Abdullah, MEngg
- Chemical Engineering - Divine Angela G. Sumalinog, PhD
- Mechanical Engineering - Nelson M. Pasamonte, PME, MSME, ASEAN Eng., FPSME
- Electrical Engineering - Carlito M. Gutierez, MS
- Electronics Engineering - Edison A. Roxas, PhD, PECE
- Industrial Engineering - Ninna S. Ocampo, MBA, PIE

=== Laboratory supervisors ===
- Civil Engineering Laboratory - Rocel A. Pioquinto, MEngg
- Chemical Engineering Laboratory - Divine Angela G. Sumalinog, PhD
- Mechanical Engineering Laboratory - Jeffrey G. Mercado, RMEE, MS
- Electrical Engineering Laboratory - Hyson Peter R. David, MEngg
- Electronics Engineering Laboratory - Kanny Krizzy D. Serrano, MSc
- Industrial Engineering Laboratory - Gabriel C. Bucu, CIE, AAE
- Chemistry Laboratory - Noel S. Sabarillo, M.Sc.
- Machine Shop - Rogelio O. Almira Jr., PME, MS
- Physics Laboratory - John Michael S. Abrera, MEng, MS
- Computer Laboratory - Armando V. Barreto, MBA, PECE

== Degree programs ==
- B.S. in Chemical Engineering
  - The Chemical Engineering (ChE) curriculum provides the student with the basic knowledge and skills needed for future leadership and global competitiveness in the practice of the Chemical Engineering profession. The core of its program is the Design of Equipment, Plants and Processes which are useful on several industries like the Petrochemical, Pharmaceutical, Biochemical, Biomedical, Food, Polymers, Metallurgical and Manufacturing also it provides a rich environment for research, and for imbibing Christian values distinct to Thomasian engineers.
- B.S. in Civil Engineering
  - The Civil Engineering (CE) curriculum covers, among others, the design, construction, and maintenance of roads, bridges, buildings, water supply, irrigation, flood control, and ports. It also includes environmental engineering infrastructure development and human settlements. The CE program prepares its students to be technically competent and socially responsible civil engineers.
- B.S. in Electronics and Communications Engineering
  - The Electronics & Communications Engineering (ECE) curriculum aims to fully equip the student with theoretical knowledge and practical experience in the design of electronic and communication circuits, in broadcast and acoustics technology, computer networks and hardware, telecommunication systems, and industrial automation.
- B.S. in Electrical Engineering
  - The Electrical Engineering (EE) curriculum emphasizes the application of the basic theories to the design, installation, operation, and maintenance of electrical apparatus and equipment. It also covers the use of these apparatus and equipment in the generation, transmission, distribution, and utilization of electrical energy for various commercial and industrial purposes.
- B.S. in Industrial Engineering
  - The Industrial Engineering (IE) program is designed to prepare the student for professional work in the design, improvement, installation, and maintenance of integrated systems of people, materials, information, equipment, and methods. The curriculum covers the engineering and social sciences, principles and methods of systems analysis and design, industrial management and human behavior.
- B.S. in Mechanical Engineering
  - The Mechanical Engineering (ME) curriculum provides the student with the fundamental knowledge and understanding of the various types of machines, their elements, construction, operation, and functions, in preparation for professional work on machine design. The curriculum also covers the cycles, construction, and operation of mechanical prime movers like the internal combustion engine and the spark-ignition engine for power generation.

== Student organizations ==
=== Student regulatory bodies ===
- Engineering Student Council (UST ESC) - the highest student government of the Faculty of Engineering
- Engineering Division for Student Alliance (UST EDSA) - the official umbrella organization of the Faculty of Engineering
- Engineering Commission on Elections (Engineering COMELEC) - the official student elections authority of the Faculty of Engineering

=== Major organizations ===
- Association of Civil Engineering Students (ACES)
- Chemical Engineering Society (ChES)
- Mechanical Engineering Club (MEC)
- Electrical Engineering Circuit (EEC)
- Network of Electronics Engineering Students (NECES)
- Industrial Engineering Circle (IEC)

=== Special interest groups ===
- Engineering Quiz Team
- Engineering Varsity Teams - Men's and Women's Basketball Team, Men's and Women's Volleyball Team, Men's and Women's Football Team, and Men's Judo Team
- The Thomasian Engineer - Official Publication of UST's Faculty of Engineering
- Pax Romana Engg - IICS
- Engineering Dance Troupe
- One Voice - The Official Chorale of UST Engineering
- ORSP UST
- UST Eco Tigers
- ASHRAE
- UST - IEEE Student Branch

== See also ==
- Roque Ruaño
