= Frassati Building =

Academic building in Manila, Philippines

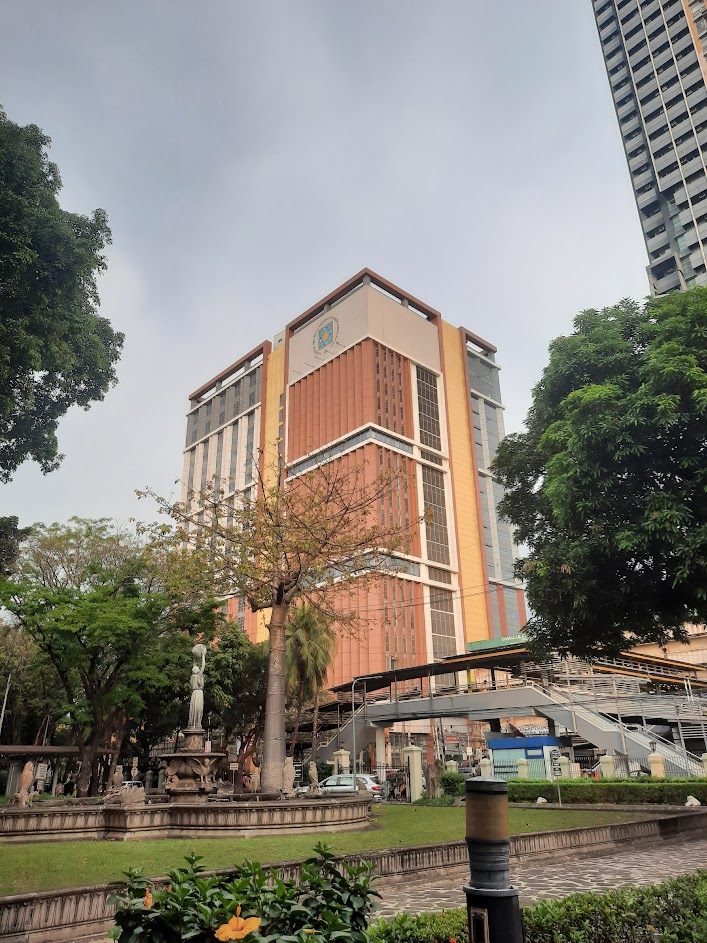
- Frassati Building in 2024

- Location within Metro Manila
- Alternative names: Saint Pier Giorgio Frassati, O.P. Building (full)

General information
- Status: Completed
- Type: School building
- Location: corner of Cayco Street and Extramadura Street, Sampaloc, Manila, Philippines
- Coordinates: 14.6086°N 120.9921°E
- Current tenants: UST Senior High School, UST College of Information and Computing Sciences, UST Faculty of Arts and Letters, Santo Tomas e-Service Providers, UST Educational Technology Center, DOST-TOMASInno Center
- Construction started: 2017
- Completed: 2021
- Opened: 2019
- Cost: ₱4.0 billion
- Owner: University of Santo Tomas

Technical details
- Floor count: 23

Design and construction
- Architect: Casas Architects

The Saint Pier Giorgio Frassati, O.P. Building, or simply the Frassati Building, is a 23-storey building in Sampaloc, Manila in the Philippines. It is part of the building complex of the University of Santo Tomas.

The University renamed the building from 'blessed' to 'saint' on November 22, 2025, after Frassati was canonized on 7 September 2025.

== Background ==
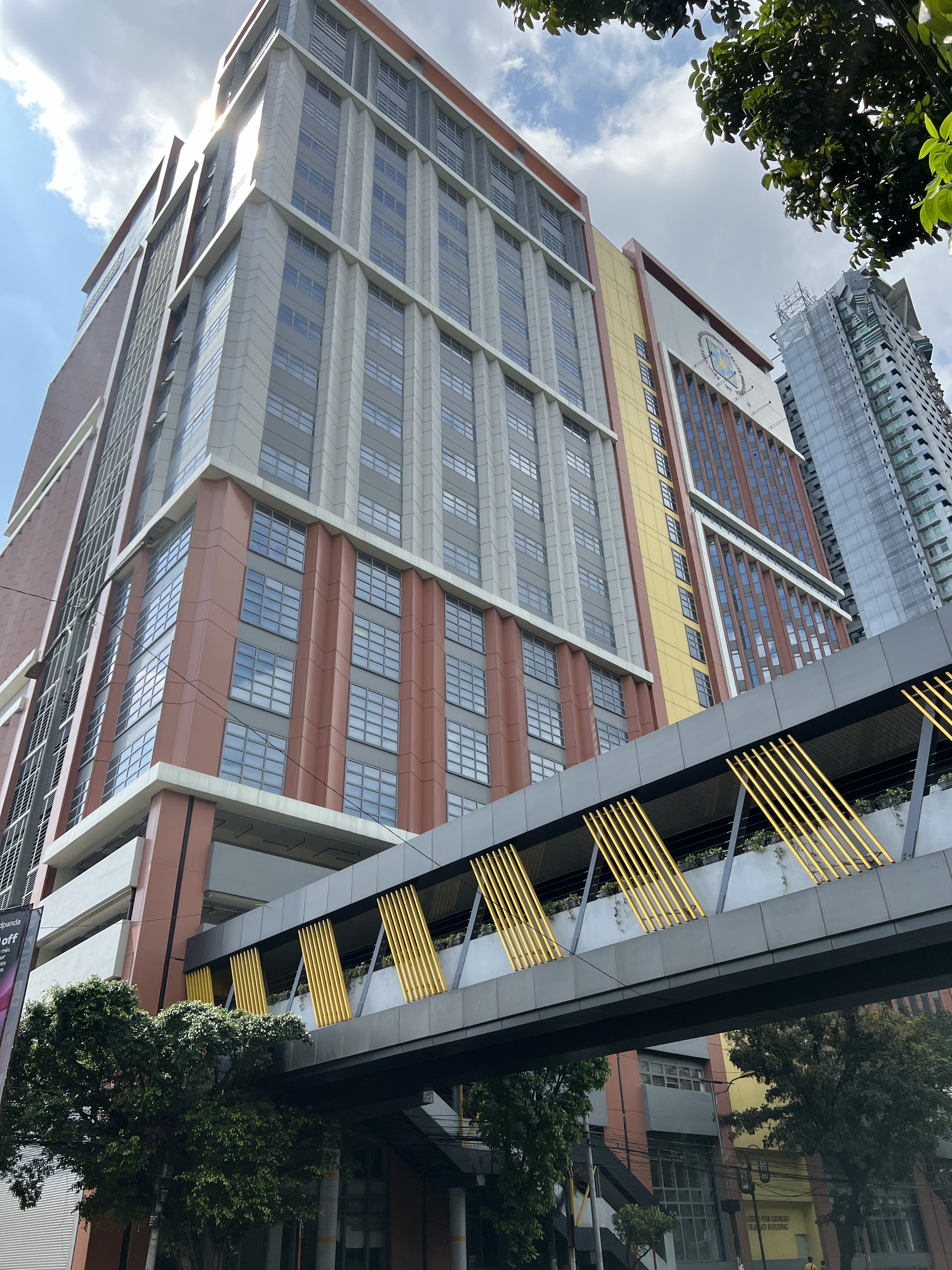
The Frassati Building with the UST Link Bridge

The Saint Pier Giorgio Frassati, O.P. Building is one of the university's major facilities located at the corner of Extremadura and Cayco Streets, just outside the University of Santo Tomas (UST) campus in Manila, Philippines. The building was officially completed and blessed on December 10, 2021.

The inauguration was also in line the of several key campus developments, including the UST Link Bridge and the campus Stormwater Drainage System.

Spanning 23 storeys, the Frassati Building also houses various academic units within UST, mainly accommodating the UST Senior High School, established in 2016.

Additionally, the building also houses the UST College of Information and Computing Sciences (CICS), DOST-TOMASInno Center, Santo Tomas e-Service Providers (STePs), and the Educational Technology Center.

On August 9, 2023, the UST CICS together with the Miguel de Benavides Library launched BiblioTech AI, an interactive library on the 19th floor.

On August 12, 2026, the UST Faculty of Arts and Letters also began using classrooms on the 17th floor of the building, sharing the facility with the UST CICS, to accommodate increasing student enrollment and expanded onsite class hours.

== Features and facilities ==
The architectural design of the Frassati Building incorporates state-of-the-art amenities, including:

- Smart classrooms
- A two-storey library
- An auditorium
- A cafeteria
- A chapel
- Gymnasium
- Laboratories
- Parking facilities

== Inauguration and blessing ==
The completion of the Frassati Building was marked by a series of blessing rites conducted on December 10, 2021, presided over by UST Vice Rector Rev. Fr. Isaias D. Tiongco, O.P., along with Dominican Fathers. Following the external blessings, a Eucharistic Celebration was held, signifying the building's consecration and commitment to the University's mission.

== Patronage ==
The building is named after Pier Giorgio Frassati, an Italian activist who is considered as a saint in Roman Catholicism, for embodying "a legacy of social justice and service to the marginalized". Beatified by Pope John Paul II in 1990, Frassati serves as the patron of UST's Senior High School, reflecting the institution's commitment to "holistic education and moral formation". On 7 September 2025, he was canonized by Pope Leo XIV.

== See also ==
- List of University of Santo Tomas buildings
