= List of University of Santo Tomas alumni =

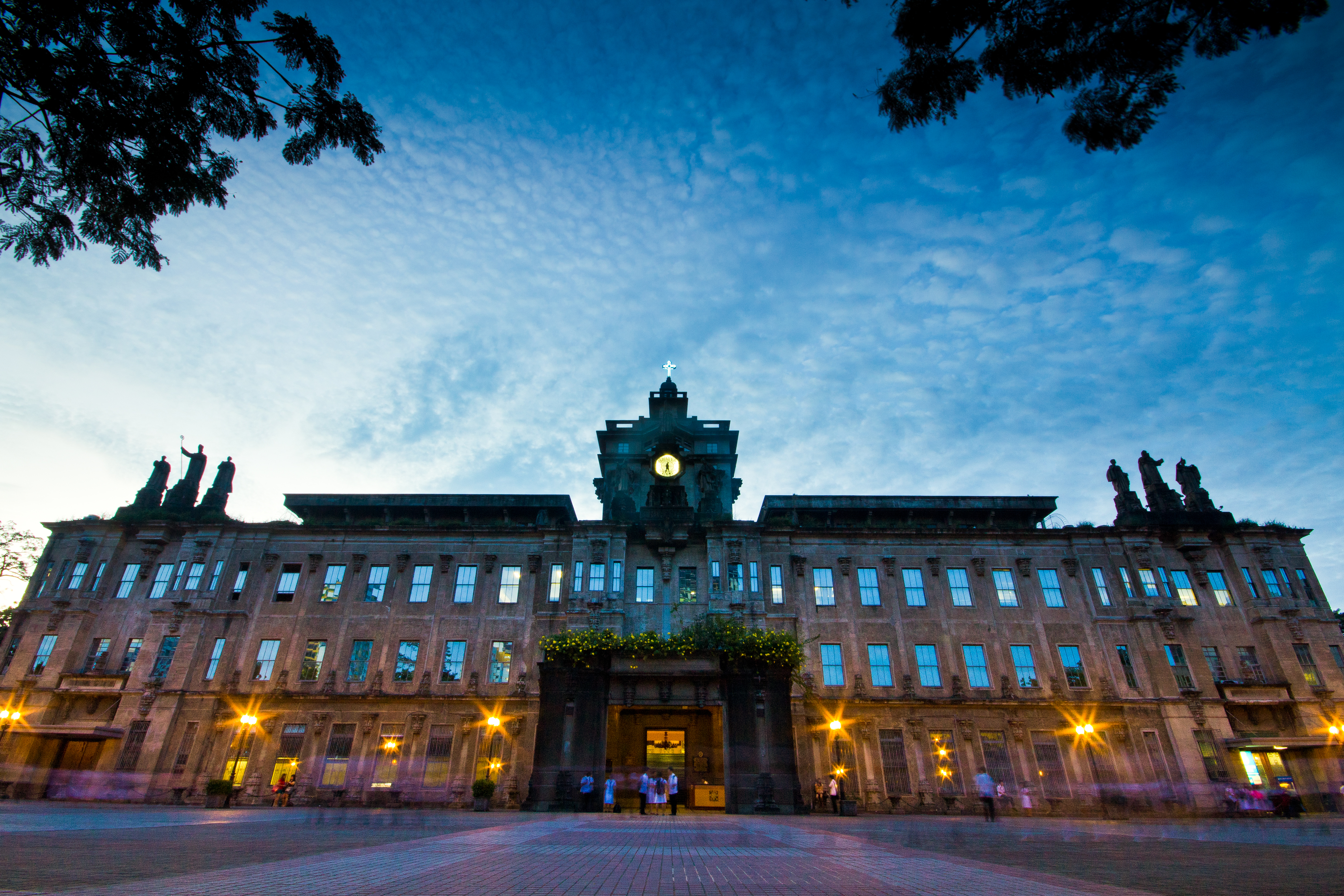
Front entrance to the main building of the University of Santo Tomas

This is a list of notable students, professors, alumni and honorary degree recipients of the University of Santo Tomas in Manila. The following Thomasians were distinguished in various fields such as public service, religion, literary arts, commerce, medicine, among others. The list includes people who have studied at various levels in the university, from elementary up to postgraduate school.

== National heroes ==
Name	Year/degree	Notability	Reference
Pedro Abad Santos	1891	Physician and lawyer, founder of Socialist Party of the Philippines, anti-Japanese guerrilla in World War II	
Gregorio Aglipay	A.B. 1881, LL.B. w/ theological studies 1882–1883 (transferred to Vigan Seminary)	Military Vicar General of the Revolutionary Government of the Philippines, Lieutenant general during the Philippine–American War, and First Supreme Bishop (Obispo Maximo) of the Iglesia Filipina Independiente	
Felipe Agoncillo	LL.B. 1879	Lawyer and cabinet member	
Baldomero Aguinaldo	LL.B.	Leader of the Philippine Revolution	
Sofio Alandy	(no year indicated)	Member of Malolos Congress	
José Alejandrino	A.B.	Filipino general during the Philippine Revolution and Philippine–American War, Senator of the Twelfth Senatorial District of the Philippines	
Cecilio Apostol	LL.B.	Epic poet of the Spanish	
Gregorio Araneta	LL.B. 1891	Nationalist and patriot, Solicitor General 1906–1908	
Jose Maria Basa	(no year indicated)	Financed the smuggling of Jose Rizal novels to the Philippines	
José Burgos	B.Th. 1859, M.Phil. 1860, M.Th. 1862, J.C.B. 1866, J.C.D. 1871	One of the Gomburza martyrs who were falsely accused of mutiny in Cavite by the Spanish colonial authorities	
Felipe Calderón	LL.B. 1893	Lawyer, and politician, known as the "father of the Malolos Constitution"	
Epifanio de los Santos	LL.B. 1896–1898	Known as "The First Filipino Academician", historian, jurist and great patriot	
Marcelo H. del Pilar	LL.B. 1881	Journalist, satirist, and one of the leading Ilustrado propagandist and revolutionary leader of the Philippine Revolution	
Jose Diokno	(never graduated)	Secretary of Justice 1961–1962, anti-martial law activist, human rights lawyer, and peace advocate	
Mariano Gomez	(no year indicated)	One of the Gomburza martyrs who were falsely accused of mutiny in Cavite by the Spanish colonial authorities	
Ladislao Diwa	(no year indicated)	Founding member of Katipunan	
Fernando María Guerrero	LL.B.	Politician, journalist, lawyer and polyglot	
Emilio Jacinto	(never graduated)	Revolutionary and known as the "brains of the Katipunan"	
Antonio Luna	BPharm	Pharmacist and general office who fought in the Philippine–American War	
Apolinario Mabini	LL.B. 1894	Staunch anti-imperialist during the American occupation	
Claro Recto	LL.M. 1914	Politician, jurist, poet and one of the foremost statesmen of his generation	
José Rizal	1877–1882 (transferred to Complutense University of Madrid)	Foremost Filipino patriot, polymath, novelist, and reformist writer	
Paciano Rizal	(never graduated)	Filipino general and revolutionary	
Mariano Trías	M.D.	Considered as the first de facto Philippine Vice President	
Jacinto Zamora	JUDr. 1858	One of the Gomburza martyrs who were falsely accused of mutiny in Cavite by the Spanish colonial authorities	

== Religion ==
=== Saints and martyrs ===
Name	Year/degree	Notability	Reference
Saint Pedro Jose Almato Ribera Auras	(no year indicated)	One of the martyrs of Vietnam	
Saint Guillaume Courtet	(no year indicated)	Professor of theology, French Dominican priest, one of the martyrs of Japan	
Saint Domingo Ibáñez de Erquicia	1621–1625	Professor of theology, Spanish Dominican priest, one of the martyrs of Japan	
Saint Vicente Liem de la Paz	B.Phil. 1753; B.Th. 1758	Vietnamese Dominican friar, one of the martyrs of Vietnam	
Saint Tomás Hioji de San Jacinto	B.Phil.	A Kirishitan, one of the martyrs of Japan	
Alfredo Obviar	Theological Studies, 1919	Servant of God, whose cause of sainthood is being promoted; Auxiliary Bishop of the Archdiocese of Lipa 1944–1951; Apostolic Administrator and 1st Bishop of the Diocese of Lucena 1951–1976	
Saint Lucas del Espiritu Santo	(no year indicated)	Lecturer of arts, Spanish Dominican priest, one of the martyrs of Japan	
Saint José Ma. Diaz Sanjurjo	(no year indicated)	Professor of theology, one of the martyrs of Vietnam	
Blessed Maximino Fernandez Marinas	B.Phil., B.Th. 1888	One of the martyrs of religious persecution in Spain during the Spanish Civil War	
Blessed Buenaventura García de Paredes	B.Th.	Professor of theology and civil law, Master General of the Dominican Order 1926–1929, one of the martyrs of religious persecution in Spain during the Spanish Civil War	
Blessed José María of Manila			
Saint Antonio Gonzalez	(no year indicated)	Professor of theology, acting Rector Magnificus ca. 1630, one of the martyrs of Japan	
Saint Domingo Henares	(no year indicated)	Professor of humanities; known for his contribution to the knowledge in fields of science in Vietnam; one of the martyrs of Vietnam	
Blessed José Ma. Lopez Carillo	B.Th. 1919	One of the martyrs of religious persecution in Spain during the Spanish Civil War	
Blessed Pedro Ibáñez Alonso	B.Th. 1915	One of the martyrs of religious persecution in Spain during the Spanish Civil War	
Blessed Manuel Moreno Martinez	J.C.B.	One of the martyrs of religious persecution in Spain during the Spanish Civil War	
Blessed Jesus Villaverde Andres	Th.D. 1919	Professor of dogmatic theology and canon law, Secretary General 1919–1921, Treasurer 1929–1932, Dean of the Faculty of Sacred Theology 1932–1934, one of the martyrs of religious persecution in Spain during the Spanish Civil War	

=== Clergymen ===
Name	Year/degree	Notability	Reference
Jose Advincula	S.T.L. (1975) ThD (Honoris causa) (2026)	Cardinal, current Archbishop of Manila	
Jose Tomas Sanchez	S.Th.D.	Cardinal, Archbishop of Nueva Segovia, Prefect of the Congregation for the Clergy	
Ernesto Arceo	S.T.L., M.Phil., PhD	Rector Magnificus of University of Santo Tomas 2006–2007	
Antonieto Cabajog	A.B., Ph.B., Ph.L., S.T.B. 1977, J.C.L. 1981	Professor of canon law 1991–1994, current bishop of Surigao	
Regino Cortez	Ph.L., S.T.L. 1966	Professor of Sacred Scriptures, Dean of Institute of Religion 1974–1978, Rector Magnificus of Colegio de San Juan de Letran 1980–1986, Regent of College of Fine Arts and Design 2001–2006	
Oscar Cruz	H.S. 1950, Ph.L. 1958	Archbishop-emeritus of Lingayen-Dagupan 1991–2009	
Pedro Dean	Ph.B. 1952, Ph.L. 1953, S.T.B. 1954, S.T.L. 1956	Archbishop of Palo 1985–2006	
Rolando dela Rosa	Ph.D/S.T.D	Rector Magnificus of University of Santo Tomas 1990–1998 and 2007–2012, professor of theology, chairman of Commission on Higher Education 2004	
Zeferino González	1848	Professor of theology and philosophy, first director of UST Museum of Arts and Sciences, Archbishop of Seville 1883–1885, Archbishop of Toledo 1885–1886	
Onesimo Gordoncillo	1961	Archbishop-emeritus of Capiz	
Deogracias Iñiguez	BSEd 1968	First Bishop of Caloocan (now Bishop-emeritus)	
Tamerlane Lana	S.T.B. 1979; S.T.L., M.A. 1981; S.T.D 1996	Current Rector Magnificus of Colegio de San Juan de Letran, Rector Magnificus of University of Santo Tomas 1998–2006	
Leonardo Legaspi	S.T.L. 1961; S.T.D 1962	First Filipino Rector Magnificus of University of Santo Tomas 1971–1977, Archbishop of Nueva Caceres 1984–2012, and first Vicar of the Dominican Province of the Philippines	
Raul Martirez	S.T.B. 1960	Bishop-Emeritus of San Jose de Antique 1983–2002	
Nicholas Mondejar	Ph.L., S.T.L. 1947	Bishop-Emeritus of San Carlos 1987–2001	
Edmund Nantes	(no year indicated)	Former Prior Provincial of the Dominican Province of the Philippines	
Joel Porlares	JCL 2003	Incumbent and 14th Supreme Bishop of the Philippine Independent Church (Iglesia Filipina Independiente)	
Miguel Purugganan	Ph.B., Ph.L 1953	Bishop of Ilagan 1974–1999	
Salvador Quizon	S.T.L. 1949	Former Auxiliary Archbishop of Lipa	
José Rojas, Jr.	S.T.B. 1980; S.T.L. 1982	Current Bishop of Libmanan	
José Salazar	S.T.L.	Parish priest, Auxiliary Bishop of Butuan 2002, Auxiliary Bishop of Lipa 2003	
Ernesto Salgado	S.T.L. 1962	Archbishop of Nueva Segovia 2005-2013, Bishop of Laoag 2000–2005, Vicar Apostolic of Baguio 1987–2000	
Manuel Sobreviñas	Ph.B. 1946, A.B. 1947, S.T.B. 1949, S.T.L. 1951	Bishop-Emeritus of Imus	
Diosdado Talamayan	Ph.L. 1953, S.T.L. 1957	Current Archbishop of Tuguegarao	
Jesus Tuquib	S.T.D 1967	Archbishop of Cagayan de Oro 1988–2006	
Fidel Villarroel	S.T.D	Dominican Master of Sacred Theology (title once held by St. Dominic de Guzman), former secretary to the Apostolic Nunciature, former UST archivist, Prefect of Libraries, Spanish Department head, and respected historian	

== Government ==
=== Presidents of the Philippines ===
Name	Year/degree	Notability	Reference
José Laurel	A.B., PhD 1919	Third president of the Philippines, president of the Second Republic	
Diosdado Macapagal	LL.B. 1936	Ninth president of the Philippines, fifth president of the Third Republic	
Sergio Osmeña	LL.B. 1903	Second president of the Commonwealth of the Philippines, and fourth president of the Philippines 1944–1946	
Manuel Quezon	LL.B. 1903	First president of the Commonwealth of the Philippines, considered the second president after Emilio Aguinaldo	

=== Vice Presidents of the Philippines ===
Name	Year/degree	Notability	Reference
Jejomar Binay	(did not finish)	Fifteenth vice president of the Philippines, Philippine Vice President 2010–2016 under Aquino Administration	
Fernando Lopez	LL.B. 1925	President pro tempore of the Senate of the Philippines 1958–1965; Senator of the Philippines 1947–1949; Vice President of the Philippines 1949–1953, 1965–1973; Secretary of Agriculture 1949–1953	
Arturo Tolentino	D.C.L. (meritissimus)	Ninth vice president of the Philippines, Philippine vice president February 16, 1986 – February 25, 1986 under Marcos Administration, 12th president of the Senate of the Philippines, also known as the "father of the Philippine Archipelagic Doctrine"	
Mariano Trías	M.D.	Considered the first de facto Philippine vice president	

=== Prime Minister of Spain ===
Name	Year/degree	Notability	Reference
Marcelo Azcárraga	LL.B.	Thirteenth prime minister of Spain following the restoration of the Spanish monarchy and the only Spanish prime minister of Filipino descent	

=== Chief Justices ===
Name	Year/degree	Notability	Reference
Manuel Araullo	LL.B. 1876	Chief Justice of the Supreme Court of the Philippines 1921–1924	
Cayetano Arellano	B.Phil. 1862; B.Th. 1867; J.C.B., B.C.L. 1871; LL.B. 1876	Chief Justice of the Supreme Court of the Philippines 1901–1920	
Ramón Avanceña	LL.B. 1898	Chief Justice of the Supreme Court of the Philippines 1925–1941	
Roberto Concepcion	LL.B. D.C.L. 1966	Chief Justice of the Supreme Court of the Philippines 1966–1973	
Renato Corona	D.C.L. 2011	Chief Justice of the Supreme Court of the Philippines 2010–2012	
Victorino Mapa	A.B. 1865; B.Phil., LL.B. 1877	Chief Justice of the Supreme Court of the Philippines 1920–1921	
Andres Narvasa	LL.B. 1951; D.C.L. (hc) 1992	Chief Justice of the Supreme Court of the Philippines 1991–1998	
Diosdado Peralta	LL.B 1979	Chief Justice of the Supreme Court of the Philippines 2019–present	

=== Law, governance, and politics ===
Name	Year/degree	Notability	Reference
Alice Bulos	Bachelor of Arts, Major in Sociology	Filipino-American civil rights leader who represented California in five Democratic National Conventions	
Joel Villanueva	Bachelor of Science in Commerce Degree, Major in Economics	Senator, former TESDA director general	
Pedro Tongio Liongson	Licentiates in Law and Jurisprudence 1892	Judge Advocate General, Army of the First Philippine Republic 1899	
Benigno Aquino, Sr.	LL.B. 1913	Speaker of the National Assembly of the Second Philippine Republic 1943–1944, Father of Ninoy and Grandfather of Noynoy	
Melecio Arranz	B.S. C.E.	Chairman of the Committee on Public Works and Communications 1936, President pro tempore of the Senate of the Philippines 1946–1949	
Lito Atienza	B.S.Arch.	Member of Parliament 1984–1986, vice mayor of Manila 1992–1998, mayor of Manila 1998–2007, secretary of the Environment and Natural Resources 2007–2009	
Ramon Paul Hernando	A.B. Litt	Associate Justice of the Supreme Court of the Philippines 2018	
José Avelino	LL.M.	Secretary of Labor 1935–1938, Secretary of Public Works and Transportation 1939–1941, Senator of the Philippines 1946–1951, President of the Senate of the Philippines 1946–1949	
Ramon Bagatsing	LL.M. 1971, LL.D. 1977	Member of the House of Representatives from Manila 1957–1971, longest serving mayor of Manila, 1971–1986	
Alfredo Benipayo	H.S. 1954, A.B. 1958, LL.B. 1962	Professor of law, former court administrator of the Supreme Court of the Philippines 1996–2001, chairman of Commission on Elections 2001–2002, Solicitor General 2002–2006, and former dean of Faculty of Civil Law	
Ruffy Biazon	B.S. Med.Tech.	Mayor of Muntinlupa 2022–present, Member of the Philippine House of Representatives from Muntinlupa 2001–2010 & 2016–2022, Commissioner of Bureau of Customs 2011–2013	
Cesar Climaco	A.A.	Mayor of Zamboanga City 1953–1954, Member of Parliament 1984	
Isabelo de los Reyes	LL.B. 1887	Founder/proclaimer of the Iglesia Filipina Independiente, politician, writer, and labor activist	
Jaime de Veyra	1897	Resident Commissioners from the Philippines 1917–1923	
Enrique dela Cruz, Jr.	A.B. (LegMa), LL.B. Master in Public Policy Harvard Master of Laws LLM	Board member of the second district of Bulacan	
Harriet Demetriou	LL.B. 1995	Chairman of the Commission on Elections 1999–2001	
Amado Dimayuga	LL.B. 1951	Professor of law, member of Judicial and Bar Council of the Philippines, former Dean of Faculty of Civil Law	
Loi Estrada	A.A. 1949, M.D. 1954	Professor of medicine, physician, First Lady of the Philippines 1998–2001, Senator of the Philippines 2001–2007	
Peter Favila	B.S.Comm. (B. F.)	Secretary of Trade and Industry 2005–2010	
Jose Feria	LL.B. 1940	Associate Justice of the Supreme Court of the Philippines 1986–1987, dean of Faculty of Civil Law 1979–1985	
Cancio Garcia	M.P.A. 1967	Associate Justice of the Supreme Court of the Philippines 2004–2007	
Raul Gonzalez	LL.B. 1955	Member of the Philippine House of Representatives from Iloilo 1995–2004, Secretary of Justice 2004–2009	
Arsenio Lacson	LL.B	First elected mayor of Manila 1952–1962, journalist	
Honey Lacuna	B.S. Biology	Mayor of Manila (2022–2025), former vice mayor of Manila (2016–2022), Councilor of Manila	
Joel Chua	B.S. Accountancy	Manila 3rd district representative (2022-present) and City Councilor of 3rd district of Manila (2007-2016 ,2019-2022)	
Frederick Siao	B.S. Business Administration, Major in Management	Mayor of Iligan, Lanao del Norte (2022–present), Member of the Philippine House of Representatives from Iligan lone district (2016-2022), and City Councilor of Iligan (2010-2016)	
Benito Legarda	B.C.L.	Resident Commissioner from the Philippines 1907–1912	
Joey Lina	A.B. (Econ) 1975, LL.B. 1979	Former governor of Laguna, Senator of the Philippines, former secretary of Interior and Local Government	
Fernando Lopez	LL.B. 1925	President pro tempore of the Senate of the Philippines 1958–1965; Senator of the Philippines 1947–1949; Vice President of the Philippines 1949–1953, 1965–1973; Secretary of Agriculture 1949–1953	
Francisco Rodrigo	B.S.Ed.	Senator of the Philippines 1955–1969, playwright, and broadcaster	
Angelina Sandoval-Gutierrez	LL.B. 1960	Associate Justice of the Supreme Court of the Philippines 2000–2008	
Arturo Tolentino	LL.M. 1937, LL.D. 1938	Former president of the Senate of the Philippines, vice president of the Philippines 1986	
Lorenzo Tañada	D.C.L.	Former Senator of the Philippines, Solicitor General of the Philippines, longest-serving senator in Philippine History	
Florin Hilbay	A.B. in Economics 1985	Former Solicitor General of the Philippines 2014–2016	
Monina Arevalo Zenarosa	LL.B. 1959	Retired Associate Justice of the Court of Appeals of the Philippines, former chairman of the Independent Commission Against Private Armies	
Victor Ziga	(no year indicated)	Former minister of General Services, former chairman of the Commission on Appointments	
Maybelle Blossom Dumlao-Sevillena	A.B. Polsci. 2000	Provincial Administrator (Province of Nueva Vizcaya), Provincial Local Government Unit of Nueva Vizcaya 2013–present, member, Sangguniang Panlalawigan of Nueva Vizcaya 2004–2013, Municipal Councilor, Sangguniang Bayan of the Municipality of Solano, Nueva Vizcaya 2001–2004	
Tranquil Salvador III	A.B. in Economics 1987	Remedial law reviewer; bar examiner, remedial law (2018 bar examinations); author of Criminal Procedure; dean of Manila Adventist College-School Law and Jurisprudence; former dean of Pamantasan ng Lungsod ng Pasay	
Jose Altavas	LL.B.	Former Senator of the Philippines, Constitutional Convention Delegate, former governor of Capiz	
José Ma. Veloso	LL.B.	Former Senator of the Philippines, former governor of Leyte	
Isauro Gabaldon	LL.B.	Former Senator of the Philippines, Resident Commissioner to the U.S. House of Representatives	
Filemon Sotto	LL.B.	Former Senator of the Philippines, Constitutional Convention Delegate	
Teodoro Sandiko	LL.B.	Former Senator of the Philippines, former governor of Bulacan, former Minister of Interior	
Alejo Mabanag	LL.B.	Former Senator of the Philippines	
Jose Hontiveros	LL.B.	Former Senator of the Philippines, Constitutional Convention Delegate	
Juan Sumulong	LL.B.	Former Senator of the Philippines, Revolutionary	
Salvador Z. Araneta	LL.B. 1920	Former Cabinet member of Quirino and Magsaysay Administration and a government official during Quezon and Roxas Administration. Delegate to both 1935 and 1971 Constitutional Convention.	

=== Military & law enforcement services ===
Name	Year/degree	Notability	Reference
Leandro Aragoncillo	(no year indicated)	USMC gunnery sergeant, spy	
Alberto F Braganza	A.B.	Army lieutenant general, Last Commanding General of AFP Southern Command	
Pedro R. Cabuay Jr	B.S.B.A 1968	Army lieutenant general, former commander; Intelligence Service AFP, former director of NICA	
Angel Sadang	B.S. 1956	Army brigadier general	
Vicente R Raval	B.S.	Brigadier general, former Chief of the Philippine Constabulary	
Alberto I Gabriel	M.D.	Medical Corps colonel, former Philippine Army Chief Surgeon	
Alfredo T. Dansico	M.D.	Medical Corps major, former Philippine Army surgeon, WW; 2nd battalion, 51st Infantry Platoon leader	

== Arts, literature, and humanities ==
=== National Artists ===
Name	Year/degree	Notability	Reference
Ernani Cuenco	H.S., B.Mus.	National Artist for Music, professor of music, composer, and musical director	
Daisy Hontiveros-Avellana	M.A.	National Artist for Theater and Film, "First Lady of Philippine theater", performer, film director, and writer	
Nick Joaquin	A.A.	National Artist for Literature, writer and journalist	
F. Sionil José	(dropped out)	National Artist for Literature, novelist	
Ang Kiukok	(never graduated)	National Artist for Visual Arts, painter, visual artist	
Leandro Locsin	B.S.Arch.	National Artist for Architecture, architect, and interior designer	
Bienvenido Lumbera	A.B.J. 1950	National Artist for Literature, editor-in-chief of The Varsitarian 1953, prizewinning poet, critic and dramatist	
Juan Nakpil	B.S.Arch.	National Artist for Architecture, architect, teacher and community leader	
Jeremias Elizalde Navarro	B.F.A. 1951	National Artist for Painting	
Ildefonso Santos	B.S.Arch. 1954	National Artist for Architecture, poet, sculptor, and writer	
Rolando Tinio	A.B.Phil.	National Artist for Theater and Film, poet, dramatist, director, actor, critic, essayist and educator	
José María Zaragoza	B.S.Arch. 1936	National Artist for Architecture	

=== Literary and visual arts ===
Name	Year/degree	Notability	Reference
Angelito Antonio	B.F.A, 1964	Painter of Filipino genre paintings	
Eugenia Apostol	A.B., 1949	2006 Ramon Magsaysay Award for Journalism awardee	
Arnold Molina Azurin	B.Phil, 1967	Poet, essayist, and anthropologist	
Jose Blanco	B.F.A.	Artist	
Charito Bitanga	B.F.A. in Advertising	Member of Art Verite', dean of Philippine Women's University College of Fine Arts	
Cirilo F. Bautista	A.B.	Critic and writer of nonfiction, fiction, and poetry	
Carmelo Casas	B.Arch., 1976	Architect, co-founder and partner of Recio+Casas Architects; designed First Pacific Bank in Hong Kong, Mandarin Hotel Macau, Thailand's Stock Exchange Building, Phuket Yacht Club Hotel, Pacific Plaza Towers in Fort Bonifacio, Salcedo Park Twin Towers in Makati and Richmonde Hotel in Ortigas	
Alfredo Esquillo	B.F.A, 1993	Visual artist, recipient of 13 Artist Awards in 2000	
Eric Gamalinda	A.B.	Poet	
Francisco Alonso Liongson	Licentiate in Civil Law, 1916	Playwright in the Golden Age of Philippine literature in Spanish	
Berlin Manalaysay	B.F.A in Advertising	Creator of Combatron comics	
Apolonio Medina Jr.	B.Arch., 1983	Creator of Pugad Baboy comics	
Danilo P. Santiago	B.F.A, 1978		
Washington "Tonton" Young	B.S. Business Administration	Creator of Pupung comics	
William Henry Scott	Ph.D. in History	Historian of the Gran Cordillera Central and Prehispanic Philippines	
Wilson Tortosa	B.F.A in Advertising, 2000	Filipino comic book artist	
Gregorio F. Zaide	Ph.D. in History, 1943	Historian, academician and politician, known as "dean of Filipino historiographers", former president of Philippine Historical Association	

=== Film and television ===
Name	Year/degree	Notability	Reference
Aiza Seguerra	College of Fine Arts and design, Conservatory of Music	Singer	
Albert Martinez	Educ H.S., 1978, B.S.Mechanical engineering	Actor	
Ali Sotto	A.B.Com. Arts	Actress, news anchor	
Allyzon Lualhati	Institute of Tourism and Hospitality Management	Actress	
Anne De Mesa	B.S. Accountancy	Beauty queen and model, won the Miss Tourism Worldwide 2026 competition.	
Archie Alemania	Bachelor of Arts Communication Arts	Actor	
Arnold Clavio	Bachelor of Arts Journalism	Journalist	
Aubrey Miles	Conservatory of Music	Actress, TV host, singer, model	
Bernardo Bernardo	B.A. Journalism	Stage actor, comedian, and film director	
Brillante Ma. Mendoza	B.F.A. Advertising	First Filipino Cannes Prix de la mise en scène, awarded in 2009	
Charlene Gonzales-Mulach	B.S. Psychology	Actress and beauty queen, won the Binibining Pilipinas-Universe 1994 title and represented the Philippines at the Miss Universe 1994	
Christian Esguerra	B.A. Journalism, M.A. Theology	Journalist, news anchor	
Dennis Padilla	A.B. Political Science	Actor, comedian and politician, Councilor of Caloocan 2001–2007	
Dominic Ochoa	B.S. Business Administration	Actor	
Eula Valdez	A.B. Asian Studies	Actress and commercial model	
Iza Calzado	B.F.A.	Actress, TV host and commercial model	
Jamie Rivera	A.B. Economics	Singer, known as "Inspirational Diva"	
Janine Tugonon	B.S. Pharmacy	Beauty queen, won the Miss Universe-Philippines 2012 title and placed 1st runner-up at Miss Universe 2012	
Jao Mapa	College of Fine Arts and design	Actor, model, painter	
Joem Bascon	B.S. Electrical Engineering	Actor	
Jojo Alejar	A.B. Political Science	Actor, comedian	
Karen Ibasco	B.S. Applied Physics, M.Sc. Applied Physics	Beauty queen, Won Miss Philippines Earth 2017, and won Miss Earth 2017	
Lourd de Veyra	A.B. Journalism	Musician, emcee, poet, journalist, and activist	
Maricar Reyes	Faculty of Medicine and Surgery	Actress, TV personality and commercial model	
Miriam Quiambao	B.S. Physical Therapy	Actress and beauty queen, Won the Binibining Pilipinas-Universe 1999 title and placed 1st runner-up at Miss Universe 1999	
Mikee Quintos	B.S. Architecture	Actress	
Nikki Buenafe Cheveh	A.B. Asian Studies	Beauty queen, won the 2025 Face of Beauty International competition	
Nonoy Zuñiga	Faculty of Medicine and Surgery	Musician, TV host, physician	
Piolo Pascual	A.B. Sociology	Actor and commercial model	
Radson Flores	Bachelor of Arts in Legal Management	Actor	
Sarah Geronimo	H.S., 2005	Singer, actress and television personality	
Sylvia La Torre	Bachelor of Music, major in Voice and minor in Piano	Queen of Kundiman	
Tessa Prieto-Valdes	B.S.Arch. (dropped out)	Columnist for Philippine Daily Inquirer, interior designer, media personality, philanthropist, and socialite	
Winnie Cordero	A.B. Communication Arts	Actress and host	

== Science, technology, and medicine ==
Name	Year/degree	Notability	Reference
Agnes Medenilla, R.M.T.	B.S. Med.Tech., 1962	President of the Philippine Association of Medical Technologist (PAMET), University of Perpetual Help System DALTA Faculty Member	
Amparo Marzan, R.N.	B.S.	Charge Nurse of Neonatal Intensive Care Unit, Naval Medical Center San Diego	
Angeles Tan-Alora, M.D.	M.D.	Former dean, University of Santo Tomas Faculty of Medicine and Surgery, executive director of Southeast Asian Center for Bioethics	
Carmencita Reodica	M.D.	Former Department of Health Secretary March 1996–June 1998	
Maria Ruth B. Pineda-Cortel, Ph.D.	Ph.D in Biological Sciences	Finalist for the 2020 ASEAN-U.S. Science Prize for Women	
Dr. Lilia Lantin	M.D.,1964	Served as the President of the Philippine American Medical Society in NJ and as the Chairman of the Foundation of the Philippine Medical Society of NJ.	

=== National Scientist ===
Name	Year/degree	Notability	Reference
Dr. Alfredo C. Santos, Ph.D.	PhD in Pharmacy	Outstanding Pharmacist Researcher of the Philippine Pharmaceutical Association, Magsaysay's Distinguished Service Star, PhilAAS Outstanding Scientist Award and former dean of University of the Philippines College of Pharmacy	

== Businesspeople ==
Name	Year/degree	Notability	Reference
Tony Tan-Caktiong	B.S. Chemical Engineering	Entrepreneur, founder, chairman, and CEO of Jollibee Foods Corporation	
Alice Eduardo		Entrepreneur, founder, president, and CEO of Sta. Elena Construction and Development Corporation	

== Sportspeople ==
The Royal and Pontifical University of Santo Tomas holds the most number of general championships in the University Athletic Association of the Philippines, 39 senior championships titles in 65 seasons. With a strong athletic program in different sporting events, the university also takes part in various sports leagues such as Filoil Flying V League, Home and Away Invitational League, Collegiate Champion's League, Shakey's V-League and UNIgames; and it continues to produce world-class athletes for the RP National Team.

=== Basketball ===
==== Glowing Goldies era ====
Name	Year/degree	Notability	Reference
Bogs Adornado		PBA 3-time MVP, former Ateneo de Manila University men's basketball coaching staff, former Adamson University men's basketball head coach	
Pacifico Arsenio, Sr.		Known as Little Giant of Philippine sports	
Gido Babilonia		Played in the PBA for Purefoods Hotdogs, Formula Shell, Pepsi Hotshots and San Miguel Beer	
Alfrancis Chua		PBA Barangay Ginebra San Miguel head coach	
Edgardo Cordero	B.S.Acct. M.B.A	PBA Toyota Super Corollas forward, former UAAP Commissioner Season 70	
Aric del Rosario		4peat UAAP Champion, Growling Tigers head coach	
Felicisimo Fajardo		Team captain of the Philippines' national basketball team in the 1948 London Olympics	
Gabby Fajardo		Member and co-captain of Philippine Team to the 1948 London Olympics; first "Mr. Basketball", a distinction from the Philippine Sportswriters Association	
Binky Favis		Former Coca-Cola Tigers head coach	
Danilo Florencio		One of PBA's 25 greatest players of all time	
Raymond Fran			
Aris Franco		Played in the PBA for Formula Shell in 1990; the oldest rookie of that season, at age 32	
Alfredo Jarencio		Present head coach of the UST men's varsity team, assistant coach PBA San Miguel Beermen	
Bobby Jose		Played in the PBA for the San Miguel Beermen, Alaska Aces, Ginebra San Miguel and Tanduay Rhum	
Gilbert Lao		PBA Sta. Lucia Realtors Center	
Christian Luanzon			
Francisco Maristela			
Larry Mumar		Member of the Philippine national basketball team in 1948 Summer Olympics & 1954 FIBA World Championship	
Rey Obias			
Iago Raterta			
Julian Rabbi Tomacruz		Played in the PBA for the San Miguel Beermen in 1992	
Edmund Yee			

==== 1990s (4-peat era) ====
Name	Year/degree	Notability	Reference
Ernesto Ballesteros			
Rudolph Belmonte			
Christopher Cantonjos		MVP, UAAP Season 58; assistant coach of UST Growling Tigers	
Bal David		Former starting point guard of Ginebra San Miguel (now Barangay Ginebra Kings)	
Lester del Rosario		Current assistant coach of the JRU Heavy Bombers	
Dennis Espino		MVP, UAAP Season 56 and 57; currently playing for the Powerade Tigers	
Rey Evangelista		Former captain of the Purefoods Tender Juicy Giants	
Patrick Roy Fran		Currently playing for Talk 'N Text Tropang Texters	
Gerard Francisco		Retired PBA player; MVP, UAAP Season 57	
Bong Hawkins		Star forward of the Tiger Cubs, played for the PHCR Altas in college, and the Alaska Aces in the PBA	
Henry Ong			
Edmund Reyes			
Dale Singson		Played for the Alaska Aces	
Joel Villanueva		Senator, former TESDA director general and former member from Untv Cup Player of Malacanang Patriots	
Siot Tanquingcen		Current head coach of the San Miguel Beermen	
Richard Yee		Currently playing for Barako Bull Energy Boosters	

==== 2000s ====
Name	Year/degree	Notability	Reference
Dylan Ababou		MVP, UAAP Season 72; Mythical 5, UAAP Season 72; member, 2006 UAAP championship team; currently playing for Smart Gilas Pilipinas	
Sylvester John Apo		2011 MVP Basketball Departmental League, 2011 UST Growling Tigers Men's Basketball Team B	
Francis Allera		Member, 2006 UAAP championship team; currently playing in the PBA	
Cyrus Baguio		Known as the Master Showman of the UAAP during his Tiger Days because of his high-flying dunks and clutch plays, currently playing in the PBA	
Mark Canlas		Member, 2006 UAAP championship team; currently playing for PBA Developmental League	
Jun Cortez		Two-time Juniors' MVP, UAAP Season 63 and 64; member, 2006 UAAP championship team	
Jervy Cruz		MVP, UAAP Season 70; Mythical 5, UAAP Season 69, 70, and 71; member, 2006 UAAP championship team; currently playing for Rain or Shine Elasto Painters	
John Paul Cuan		Two-time UAAP assists leader, UAAP Season 69 and 70; member, 2006 UAAP championship team	
Aries Dimaunahan		Currently playing for Alaska Aces	
June Dizon		2006 UAAP championship team	
Jojo Duncil		MVP, UAAP Season 69; member, 2006 UAAP championship team; currently playing for Petron Blaze Boosters	
Alwyn Espiritu		Juniors' MVP, UAAP Season 61	
Allan Evangelista		Team captain of the 2006 UST Growling Tigers men's basketball; member, 2006 UAAP championship team	
Jeric Fortuna		PBA Champion (2014–2015 Philippine Cup, 2015 Governors), ABL Champion (2013), PCCL Champion (2012), PCCL Myhtical Five (2012)	
Niño Gelig		Played for the Welcoat Dragons in the PBA	
Christian Luanzon		Played for the Alaska Aces in the PBA	
Jeric Teng		Rookie of the Year UAAP Season 72; PCCL 2012 Finals MVP; PCCL 2012 Mythical Five; currently playing for NorthPort Batang Pier	
Kiefer Ravena		Rookie of the Year UAAP	

=== Volleyball ===
Name	Year/degree	Notability	Reference
Mary Jean Balse	B.S.Comm.	Rookie of the Year, UAAP Season 67; Best Attacker, UAAP Season 70; Shakey's V-League three-time MVP	
Venus Bernal	B.S.Comm.	National team player; MVP, UAAP Season 69	
Rubie De Leon	(no year indicated)	Former member of the Philippines Women's National Team	
Kate Co Yu Kang	2008	Best Receiver, Shakey's V-League 1st Season 1st Conference	
Ray Karl Dimaculangan	2010	Three-time Best Server, MVP, UAAP Season 71	
Rhea Dimaculangan	B.S.S.S. 2012	Best Server and MVP, UAAP Season 72	
Lilet Mabbayad	(no year indicated)	Rookie of the Year, UAAP Season 68	
Aiza Maizo	B.S.F.T 2011	Three-time MVP in Shakey's V-League, Shakey's V-league season 5 conference 2 Best Server, Season 6 conference 1 Best Blocker, season 6 conference 2 conference MVP and finals MVP, Season 7 conference 1 Best Attacker and Finals MVP, UAAP Season 71 Best Attacker, UAAP Season 73 Best Scorer and Best Receiver	
Joyce Pano	(no year indicated)	Best Server, Shakey's V-League 1st Season 1st Conference	
Henry James Pecaña	2011	Best Receiver, UAAP season 71; Finals MVP, UAAP Season 72	
Roxanne Pimentel	(no year indicated)	Former member of the national team	
Mozzy Ravena	1991	Former middle blocker for UST and the national team; UAAP and V-League commentator	
Nazareno Roque	2009	MVP, UAAP Season 70	
Sisi Rondina	Sports Studies 2019	MVP, UAAP Beach Volleyball Season 78–81; MVP and Athlete of the Year, UAAP Indoor Volleyball Season 81	
Maria Angeli Tabaquero	A.B.Com. Arts 2010	Member of the national team	
Denise Patricia Tan	A.B.Com. Arts	Best Setter, UAAP Season 69	
John Paul Torres	2010	Best Scorer, UAAP Season 73; Best Attacker, UAAP Season 73; Most Valuable Player, UAAP Season 73	
Alyssa Valdez	H.S. 2011	MVP, UAAP Season 71 and 72; Junior Athlete of the Year, UAAP Season 71	

=== Taekwondo ===
Name	Year/degree	Notability	Reference
Angelito Oliver Imperio	BS Medical Technology 1999	Magna cum laude; member of National Team; assoc. head instructor, Philippine Taekwondo Federation	
Donald Geisler	A.B.Com. Arts	Member of national team; gold medalist, 2005 Southeast Asian Games and 2004 Summer Olympics	
Tshomlee Go	B.S.Ed.	MVP, UAAP Season 66; member of national team; gold medalist, 2005 Southeast Asian Games and 2004 Summer Olympics	
Esther Marie Singson	B.S.Ed.	Rookie of the Year, UAAP Season 66; member of national team; gold medalist, 2005 Southeast Asian Games and 2004 Summer Olympics	

=== Other sports ===
Name	Year/degree	Notability	Reference
Rubilen Amit	B.S.Acct.	Pool player	
David Basa	B.S. Tourism	Former player and forward, Philippines national football team	
Jethro Dionisio	B.S.Acct. 1994	Philippines' top steel shooter	
Gretchen Malalad	A.B.Com. Arts	Karate player, gold medalist, 2005 Southeast Asian Games; broadcast journalist	
Antonio Siddayao	A.B.	Dean of Filipino sportswriters	

== Academe ==
=== Administrators and faculty members ===
Name	Year/degree	Notability	Reference
Ophelia Alcantara Dimalanta	(no year indicated)	Executive director, UST Center for Creative Writing and Studies; former dean, UST Faculty of Arts and Letters	
Merlinda Bobis	(no year indicated)	Professor, Creative Writing Program, University of Wollongong in Australia; winner: Australian Writers' Guild Award, Ian Reed Radio Drama Prize, International Prix Italia, Steele Rudd Award for the Best Published Collection of Australian Short Stories, Judges' Choice Award at the Bumbershoot Bookfair in the Seattle Arts Festival, UMPIL (Union of Writers in the Philippines) awardee	
Rustica Carpio	2003	Former chairman, President's Committee on Culture and the Arts, Far Eastern University; former dean, College of Languages and Mass Communication, Polytechnic University of the Philippines; founder, Mass Communication Program, Pamantasan ng Lungsod ng Maynila; UMPIL (Union of Writers in the Philippines) awardee	
Alfredo Co	(no year indicated)	Post-doctoral Fellow, Sorbonne University of Paris	
Margarita Cojuangco	(no year indicated)	President, Philippine Public Safety College; former governor of Tarlac	
Rolando de la Rosa, O.P.	(no year indicated)	Former chairman, Commission on Higher Education; former rector, University of Santo Tomas	
Marilu Madrunio	(no year indicated)	Former dean, University of Santo Tomas Graduate School; forensic linguist	
Cristina Pantoja-Hidalgo	(no year indicated)	Vice president for Public Affairs, University of the Philippines; former dean, UP College of Arts and Letters; former executive director, UP Institute of Creative Writing; former director, UP Press	
Carlos A. Santos-Viola	(no year indicated)	Faculty, College of Architecture	
Henry Tenedero	(no year indicated)	Director, International Learning Styles Network; author and educational consultant	

== Noted honorary Thomasians ==
Through the years, the University of Santo Tomas has conferred the title of Doctor "honoris causa" (honorary degree) upon men and women who have been recognized for their contributions to the development of Philippine society.

Name	Year/degree	Notability	Reference
Corazon Aquino	LL.D. (hc) 1987	President of the Philippines 1986–1992	
Francis Arinze	(no year indicated)	Igbo Nigerian Cardinal of the Roman Catholic Church, current Cardinal Bishop of Velletri-Segni, Prefect Emeritus of the Congregation for Divine Worship and the Discipline of the Sacraments 2002–2008	
Sebastiano Baggio	(no year indicated)	Italian cardinal, president of the Pontifical Commission for Vatican City State 1984–1990	
Irina Bokova	2011	Bulgarian politician, incumbent Directors-General of UNESCO	
Paul Josef Cordes	S.T.D. (hc) 2007	German Cardinal of the Roman Catholic Church, president of the Pontifical Council Cor Unum 1995–2010	
Victorio Edades	D.F.A. (hc) 1977	1976 National Artist in Painting	
Damaskinos of Switzerland	D.Th. (hc) 1999	Senior bishop of the Eastern Orthodox Patriarchate of Jerusalem, current member of the Holy Synod of Jerusalem	
Juan Carlos de Borbón	LL.D. (hc) 1974	Incumbent king of Spain	
Józef Glemp	(no year indicated)	Polish Cardinal of the Roman Catholic Church, Archbishop of Warsaw 1981–2006	
Joseph Höffner	(no year indicated)	German Cardinal of the Roman Catholic Church, Archbishop of Cologne 1969–1987	
Alfonso López Trujillo	(no year indicated)	Colombian Cardinal Bishop of the Roman Catholic Church, president of the Pontifical Council for the Family 1990–2008	
Chiara Lubich	S.T.D. (hc) 1997	Italian Catholic activist and leader, foundress of the Focolare Movement	
Kōichirō Matsuura	LL.D. (hc) 2006	Japanese diplomat, Director-General of UNESCO 1999–2009	
Douglas MacArthur	LL.D. (hc) 1945	American general and field marshal of the Philippine Army	
Mah Soo-lay	D.Hum. (hc) 1988	Legislator of Republic of China	
Frank Murphy	LL.D. (hc) 1934	Politician and jurist from Michigan, Governor-General of the Philippines 1933–1935, U.S. High Commissioner of the Philippines 1935–1936	
Sergio Osmeña	LL.D. (hc) 1929	Second president of the Commonwealth of the Philippines, and fourth president of the Philippines 1944–1946	
Eduardo Francisco Pironio	(no year indicated)	Italian Cardinal-Bishop of the Roman Catholic Church	
Ricardo Po Sr.	Sc.D. (hc) 2022	Founder and chairman emeritus of Century Pacific Food Incorporated	
Aurora Quezon	PhD in Ped. (hc) 1940	First Spouse of the Philippines 1935–1944, first chairperson of the Philippine National Red Cross	
Rufino Jiao Santos	(no year indicated)	First Filipino Cardinal of the Roman Catholic Church 1953–1973	
Jaime Sin	S.T.D. (hc) 1977	Roman Catholic Archbishop of Manila 1974–2003	
Andres Soriano	D.Comm. (hc) 1940	Businessman, entrepreneur and philanthropist; primary capitalist of San Miguel Corporation	
Lucio Tan	D.Comm. (hc)	One of the most prominent business magnates in the Philippines	
Tony Tan Caktiong	D.B.A. (hc) 2018	Founder and chairman of Jollibee Foods Corporation	
Ricardo Vidal	(no year indicated)	Archbishop-emeritus of Cebu 1982–2010	

== See also ==
- Category:University of Santo Tomas alumni
