= Gamma Delta Epsilon =

Filipino legal fraternity

- ΓΔΕ
- Founded: February 1948; 78 years ago University of Santo Tomas Faculty of Civil Law
- Type: Professional
- Affiliation: Independent
- Status: Active
- Emphasis: Law
- Scope: Local
- Motto: Fiat Justitia Ruat Cælum "Let justice be done, though the heavens fall"
- Colors: Blue and Red
- Chapters: 1
- Members: 1,000+ lifetime
- Headquarters: Manila; Philippines

The Gamma Delta Epsilon Fraternity (ΓΔΕ) is a Philippine professional law fraternity. It was founded in 1948 at the University of Santo Tomas Faculty of Civil Law. Its members include four justices of the Supreme Court of the Philippines, two of whom became the Chief Justice of the Philippines. In 2018, the university suspended all fraternities and sororities after the hazing death of a member of the Aegis Juris fraternity. However, Gamma Delta Epsilon continues to operate sub rosa.

== History ==
Gamma Delta Epsilon was established at the University of Santo Tomas Faculty of Civil Law in February 1948 as a society for law students and lawyers. The fraternity's founding members were Gregorio Bilog, Jesus Borromeo, Jaime Claparols, Higino Francisco, Miguel Halili Jr., Maximo Maceren, Andres Narvasa, Pablo Tangco, Antonio Venecia, Geronimo O. Veneracion, and Onofre Villaluz.

The fraternity participated in charitable fundraising events, including an annual fundraiser that benefits the Bar Exam operations and examinees and other activities to support local communities. Its sister organization was the Astrea Law Sorority which was founded in 1936.

As of 2018, the fraternity had initiated more than 1,000 active members. In 2018, the university suspended all fraternities and sororities after the hazing death of a member of Aegis Juris fraternity. However, Gamma Delta Epsilon continues to operate sub rosa. It celebrated its 75th Diamond Anniversary and inducted new members on November 11, 2023 at Club Filipino.

== Symbols ==
Gamma Delta Epsilon's motto is Fiat Justitia Ruat Cælum or "Let justice be done, though the heavens fall". The fraternity's colors are blue and red.

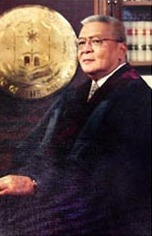
Andres R. Narvasa, 19th Chief Justice of the Philippines

== Notable members ==
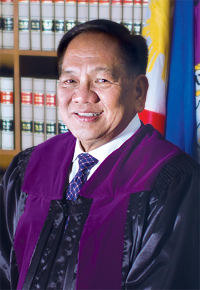
Diosdado M. Peralta, 26th Chief Justice of the Philippines

Gamma Delta Epsilon members include justices of the Supreme Court of the Philippines, the Court of Appeals of the Philippines, Sandiganbayan and the Court of Tax Appeals; lower court judges; academicians and law school deans; prosecutors and lawyers; and public servants. Following are some of its notable members:

- Arturo Buena – Associate Justice of the Supreme Court of the Philippines
- Caesar A. Casanova – Associate Justice of the Court of Tax Appeals
- Onofre A. Villaluz – Associate Justice of the Court of Appeals of the Philippines
- Amado Dimayuga – Dean Emeritus of the University of Santo Tomas Faculty of Civil Law, Former member of the Judicial and Bar Council and Commission on Higher Education Technical Panel for Legal Education
- Maximo Maceren – Former Commissioner of the Presidential Commission on Good Government
- Francisco Villa – Former Acting Ombudsman and Overall Deputy Ombudsman of the Ombudsman of the Philippines
- Jose Feria – Associate Justice of the Supreme Court of the Philippines and Dean of the University of Santo Tomas Faculty of Civil Law
- Joel Sarsiban Garcia – 28th Commandant of the Philippine Coast Guard
- Oscar C. Herrera Jr. – Associate Justice of Sandiganbayan
- Ronald Moreno – Associate Justice of Sandiganbayan
- Andres Narvasa – 19th Chief Justice of the Supreme Court of the Philippines and Dean of the University of Santo Tomas Faculty of Civil Law
- Diosdado Peralta – 26th Chief Justice of the Supreme Court of the Philippines
- Oscar B. Pimentel – Judge of the Makati Regional trial court and criminal law professor at the University of Santo Tomas Faculty of Civil Law

== Controversies and member misconduct ==
On August 6, 2008, a member of the Suprema Lex Fraternity was attacked by members of Gamma Delta Epsilon on the University of Santo Tomas campus. This took place after a heated argument between members of the two fraternities the previous day. The incident was investigated by the University of Santo Tomas Security Affairs, who noted that the two fraternities had been "at odds" for some time.

In 2012, following the death of San Beda Law freshman Marvin Reglos in 2012, members of Gamma Delta Epsilon sought to distance themselves from the incident. They voluntarily appeared before the National Bureau of Investigation (NBI) to clear their names and denied any participation in the initiation rites of Lambda Rho Beta, the fraternity allegedly involved in the fatal hazing.

Among those implicated was Christian Adobo, who, together with seventeen others, was charged with murder before the Regional Trial Court of Antipolo City. Accompanied by his fellow Gamma Delta Epsilon fraternity members from the University of Santo Tomas (UST) Faculty of Law, Adobo maintained his innocence. Although he declined to speak to the media, his fraternity brothers asserted that while he had indeed reserved Guillan's Place Resort in Antipolo City, the alleged site of the hazing, the reservation was made not for Lambda Rho Beta but for a Gamma Delta Epsilon meeting. According to their counsel, Galileo Angeles, the resort had been reserved from 10:00 p.m. on February 18 until 7:00 a.m. on February 19 for a planning meeting in preparation for Gamma Delta Epsilon's 64th anniversary celebration.

Gamma Delta Epsilon has a rivalry with Aegis Juris, another law fraternity at the University of Santo Tomas Faculty of Civil Law. In October 2014, the university temporarily suspended both fraternities as a precautionary measure after two non-physical "standoffs" between members. In November 2016, members of the two fraternities had several altercations before a November 13 fight in the lobby of Manila Hotel, resulting in injuries to four members of Gamma Delta Epsilon and the arrest of seven members of Aegis Juris. Gamma Delta Epsilon members came to the fight armed with batons and belts. While the Faculty of Civil Law's dean investigated the incident, members of both fraternities were not allowed to attend classes or enter the campus.

== See also ==
- List of fraternities and sororities in the Philippines
- Professional fraternities and sororities
