= Damaskinos =

Damaskinos or Damaskenos (Greek: Δαμασκηνός, "from Damascus"), is a Greek name, found both as a first name and as a surname. It can refer to:

- Nikolaos Damaskenos (1st century BC), Greek historian and philosopher
- John of Damascus (c. 676–749), named Ioannes Damaskenos in Greek
- Michael Damaskinos (c. 1530–1593), post-Byzantine painter from Crete
- Damaskinos Stouditis (died 1577), Greek Orthodox bishop
- Archbishop Damaskinos of Athens (1891–1949), Greek Orthodox Archbishop of Athens and Regent of Greece
- Archbishop Damaskinos of Jaffa (born 1952), Greek Orthodox bishop
- Eli Damaskinos, vampire overlord in the film Blade II
