= Thomasian =

Thomasian is an eponymous noun or adjective denoting that which is of, or related to, one of the following:

- Thomas Aquinas
- Christian Thomasius
- Dylan Thomas
- Students of University of Santo Tomas
- A Resident of St. Thomas's Hall in Madras Christian College
