= Nilo Divina =

Filipino lawyer, professor, author and educational administrator

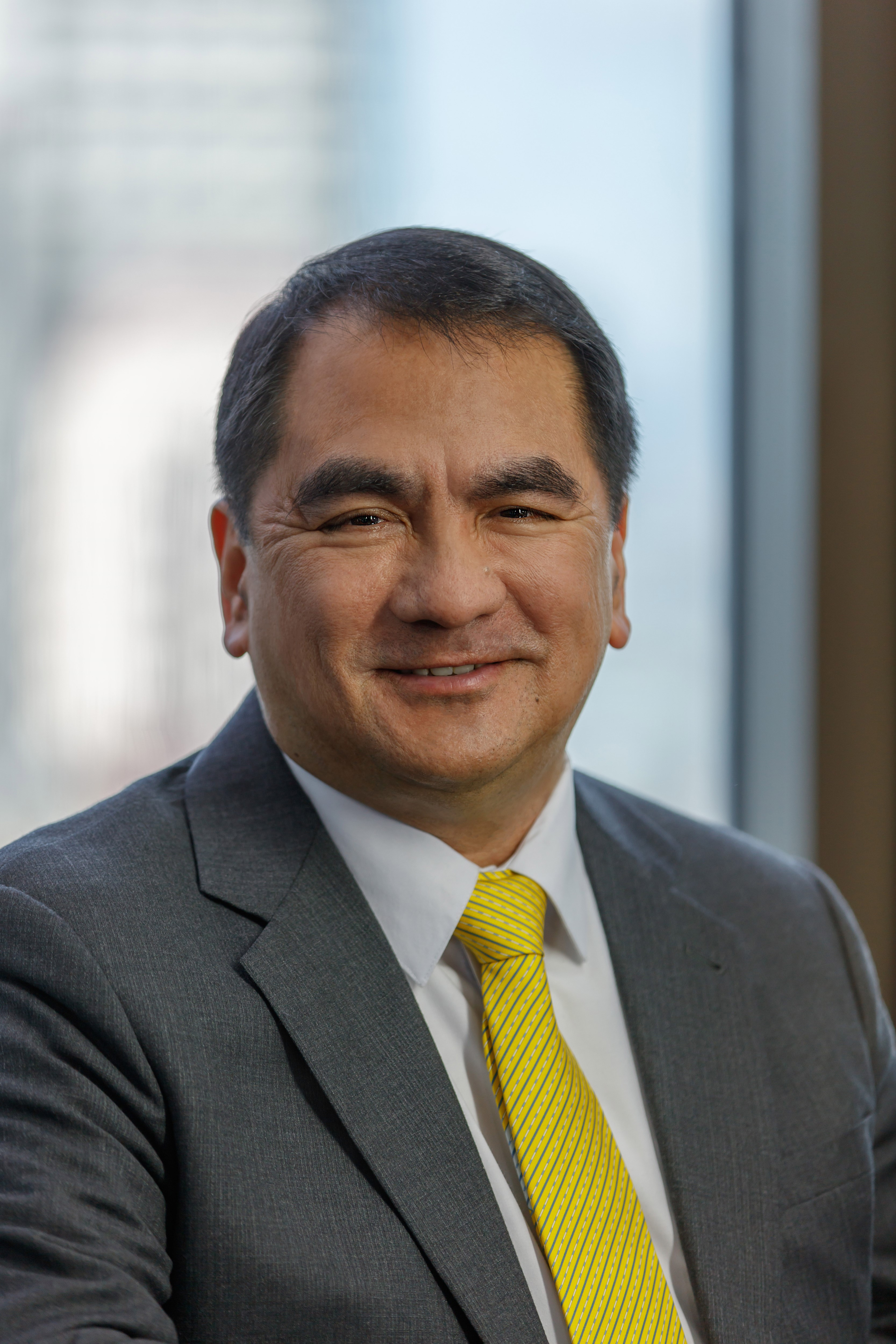

Dean of the UST Faculty of Civil Law
- Incumbent
- Assumed office 2009

Personal details
- Born: Nilo T. Divina; February 20, 1965 (age 61) Roxas, Isabela, Philippines
- Party: United Citizens of Caloocan Party
- Parent(s): Lando Divina; Aurora Divina
- Education: University of Santo Tomas; Robert Kennedy College
- Occupation: Lawyer, Professor
- Website: DivinaLaw Official website

Nilo Divina (born February 20, 1965) is a Filipino lawyer, professor, author, and educational administrator. He is the founding and managing partner of Divina Law, a law firm in the Philippines based in Makati. He is a former president of the Philippine Association of Law Schools.

In October 2023, Divina was named one of the top 100 lawyers in the Philippines by the Asia Business Law Journal for six consecutive years, from 2018 to 2023. He was also named Managing Partner of the Year in the 2021 Asian Legal Business (ALB) Philippine Law Awards held in November 2021.

In 2022, Divina was named Outstanding Thomasian Alumni for Law and Justice in the University of Santo Tomas' The Outstanding Thomasian Alumni (TOTAL) Awards. He was also named Executive of the Year for the Legal Industries in the 19th Annual International Business Awards.

== Education ==
Divina is an alumnus of the University of Santo Tomas Faculty of Arts and Letters, graduating Bachelor of Arts in Behavioral Science with honors in 1985. He pursued law at the University of Santo Tomas Faculty of Civil Law and graduated magna cum laude as valedictorian in 1989.

== Career ==
Divina started as Clerk of Court at a Regional Trial Court in Pasig. In 1992, he became an associate attorney at Misa, Castro, and Associates. He was also appointed corporate secretary of the Philippine Charity Sweepstakes Office, and was promoted to General Manager and Chief Legal Adviser. In 1993, Divina started consultancy services for Equitable PCI Bank he was ultimately promoted as executive vice president, corporate secretary, and general counsel.

In 2006, Divina and another lawyer named Edwin Uy established a law firm in Makati, Philippines that would eventually be known as Divina Law Offices. From 5 lawyers when it started, the firm now has more than 100 lawyers, including those included in the list of Philippines' Top 100 Lawyers by the Asia Business Law Journal. Under Divina's leadership, the firm has been receiving many accolades. In 2021, Divina Law Offices was named a top law firm in the banking, litigation, and restructuring and insolvency in the Philippines Law Firm Awards by the Asia Business Law Journal. In 2022, the firm received a Silver Anvil Award in the 57th Anvil Awards by the Public Relations Society of the Philippines. Divina's law firm celebrated its 20th anniversary in April 2026. The firm has more than 100 lawyers, some of which have been included in the list of top 100 lawyers in the Philippines for 8 consecutive years. The firm also conducts free legal assistance through its program Dulog Legal, which was awarded the Award of Excellence and Communication Management at the 20th Philippine Quill awards. In 2026, the firm was named Law Firm of the Year during the Philippine Law Awards by Asian Legal Business while also receiving the Energy and Resources Law Firm of the Year and Immigration Law Firm of the year awards.

He authored the law textbooks Handbook on Philippine Commercial Law, Questions & Answers on the Revised Corporation Code, and Divina on Commercial Law: A Comprehensive Guide (volumes 1 and 2). In 2023, he co-authored the "Divina Bar Review Series" with his fellow lawyers from his law office. In February 2024, the second edition of Questions & Answers on the Revised Corporation Code was launched.

He was also part of the board of directors of the United Coconut Planters Bank. He was appointed dean of the University of Santo Tomas Faculty of Civil Law in 2009, succeeding Roberto A. Abad who was appointed by then President Gloria Macapagal Arroyo into the Supreme Court of the Philippines as Associate Justice. During his tenure, the school reestablished its reputation for academic excellence, producing bar topnotchers and upholding high ethical standards in legal education. He implemented scholarship programs, provided financial assistance to students in need, and en hanced academic rigor to ensure that financial constraints would not prevent qualified individuals from pursuing a legal education.

In 2023, Divina opened a restaurant called Café Aurora in Makati City as a tribute to his mother's home-cooked meals. The restaurant, which offers Asian-inspired dishes, was renamed Aurora in 2024. It was named 2024 Best New Restaurant by Tatler Dining and was named a Michelin-selected restaurant in the inaugural MICHELIN Guide in the Philippines. In May 2025, He opened a second brand called Bistro Aurora at the Podium Social of The Podium Mall in Ortigas, Mandaluyong City. In 2025, he expanded his ventures further by opening a restaurant called Norlando's in Makati and a fitness and mixed martial arts center called Fight League in Ortigas, Pasig City.

== Awards and recognitions ==
In 2024, Nilo Divina was recognized at the Stevie International Business Awards. He was awarded the Gold Award for Achievement in Web Writing/Content for his biweekly column in the Daily Tribune, "A Dose of Law," which also evolved into a podcast and TikTok series. Award judges commended Divina's column for simplifying complex legal concepts, making them accessible to both legal professionals and the general public. In addition to Divina's personal awards, his law firm DivinaLaw received the Gold Award for Company of the Year (medium-size) in the legal industry and a Silver Award for its Corporate Social Responsibility Program of the Year in the Asia, Australia, and New Zealand region for Dulog Legal. He also won a Silver Award for Thought Leader of the Year, recognizing his leadership in the business, legal, and education sectors.

Divina has been recognized for the eighth consecutive year as one of the top lawyers in the annual list by the Asia Business Law Journal. In 2025, Divina, along with nine other lawyers from DivinaLaw, was featured in the publication's prestigious A-List, which highlights the top 100 lawyers in the Philippines. Additionally, for the second consecutive year, he was distinguished as one of the legal icons included in the list.

In January 2026, Divina was recognized by CentralBooks as the best-selling law book author of all time, and his 2025 Divina Compendious Bar Review Series was named the best-selling law book series of all time.

== Philanthropic work ==
Nilo Divina spearheads various initiatives to provide accessible legal aid through his firm's Dulog Legal program. This initiative offers free legal clinics to individuals in need of expert legal advice. Dulog Legal has conducted outreach in Malabon and Caloocan, addressing issues such as civil registry errors and estate planning. Divina also supports Bahay Kanlungan ni Maria Domenica, a home for destitute elderly women and persons with disabilities in Antipolo City. He also founded the Jomar's Haven of Hope Foundation in memory of his late son Josemaria Javier “Jomar” A. Divina. The foundation helps adults with neurodevelopmental disabilities by providing opportunities for skills development, therapy, and community connection through various activities.

In 2025, Divina joined Museo del Galeón, a non-stock, non-profit museum dedicated to recognizing the historic relationship of the Philippines and Mexico. As a member of its board of trustees, Divina and its law firm will provide pro bono legal services to the museum.

== Issues ==
=== UST Hospital tax case ===
UST Hospital was audited and it was discovered that there was a failure to disclose more than P700 million income in 2006. Divina was the lawyer for UST Hospital when the Court of Tax Appeals of the Philippines ruled against the Bureau of Internal Revenue (Philippines) on a case involving P171.5 million in income tax and a compromise penalty of P56,000. The win of the UST hospital was due to a technicality of jurisdiction where tax assessment is invalidated because the "letter of authority" issued by the tax bureau to open the hospital's books in 2007 came from BIR Manila Region 6, but the hospital is already under the jurisdiction of the tax bureau's "Large Taxpayers Services" based in Quezon City.

=== Andres Bautista case ===
In 2017, Commission on Elections chairman Andres Bautista's estranged wife pointed that Bautista was involved in corrupt practices as chairperson of the Presidential Commission on Good Government, claiming that Bautista received commissions from Divina for helping the latter's clients with the Commission on Elections. Patricia Bautista called for Divina's disbarment. Divina countered the accusations by filing perjury and libel cases against Patricia Bautista and her lawyer Lorna Kapunan.

=== Horacio Castillo case ===
In 2018, Horacio Castillo, III, a law student of the University of Santo Tomas Faculty of Civil Law was killed due to hazing. The fraternity Castillo was applying for is the same fraternity that Divina was a member of. He was summoned into a senate inquiry, where the line of questioning pertained to his alleged tolerance of hazing in the university, and for supposedly failing to stop the fraternity, Aegis Juris, from performing the illegal act. However, the Department of Justice (Philippines) did not find him criminally liable for the incident.

=== Kris Aquino case ===
Divina was among the lawyers of Kris Aquino for a case against Aquino's former staff, Nicko Falcis, whom she has accused of stealing P1,270,980.31 charged using the credit card of Aquino's entertainment production company.

=== Integrated Bar of the Philippines-Central Luzon Illegal Campaign case ===
In 2024, the SC en banc per ponente Justice Samuel Gaerlan found Divina guilty of simple misconduct under Canon II, Sections 1 and 2 of the Code of Professional Responsibility and Accountability and fined him P100,000. The Court held he donated excessive gifts to the IBP-Central Luzon local for illegal campaign. The Supreme Court's decision followed an anonymous complaint alleging that Divina engaged in illegal campaigning for the position of IBP-Central Luzon governor. The Court, however, noted that no specific IBP by-laws concerning elections were violated, as there was no concrete evidence that Divina intended to run for the position of governor of IBP-Central Luzon or that his actions amounted to illegal election activities. In response to the ruling, Divina acknowledged the Supreme Court's decision and stressed that his actions, while constituting simple misconduct, did not involve corruption or any intention to violate IBP's by-laws. Divina welcomed the Court's finding that he was not guilty of illegal campaigning. Divina also expressed his intention to file a motion for reconsideration, hoping that further context might influence the Court's view on the matter.
