= Estela Perlas-Bernabe =

Filipina jurist (born 1952)

The Honorable Estela Perlas-Bernabe
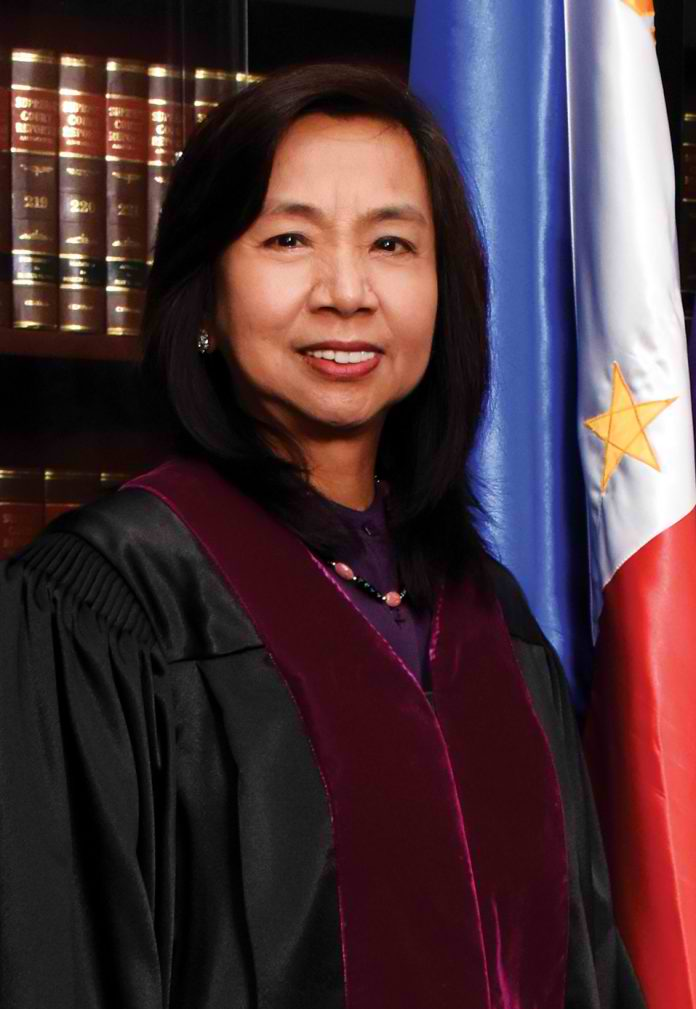

35th Senior Associate Justice of the Supreme Court of the Philippines
- In office October 26, 2019 – May 14, 2022
- Preceded by: Antonio Carpio
- Succeeded by: Marvic Leonen

171st Associate Justice of the Supreme Court of the Philippines
- In office September 16, 2011 – May 14, 2022
- Appointed by: Benigno Aquino III
- Preceded by: Conchita Carpio-Morales
- Succeeded by: Maria Filomena Singh

Associate Justice of the Philippine Court of Appeals
- In office March 15, 2004 – September 16, 2011
- Appointed by: Gloria Macapagal Arroyo

Regional Trial Court Judge for Branch 142 of Makati
- In office 2000–2004
- Appointed by: Joseph Ejercito-Estrada

Metropolitan Trial Court Judge for Branch 66 of Makati
- In office 1996–2000
- Appointed by: Fidel V. Ramos

Personal details
- Born: Estela Marcelino Perlas; May 14, 1952 (age 74) Plaridel, Bulacan, Philippines
- Spouse(s): Ricardo C. Bernabe, Jr.
- Education: St. Paul College, Manila (BS); Ateneo de Manila University (LL.B.)

Estela Marcelino Perlas-Bernabe (born May 14, 1952) is a former associate justice of the Supreme Court of the Philippines, serving from 2011 to 2022. She was the third appointee to the Supreme Court by President Benigno Aquino III on September 16, 2011.

== Background ==
Estela Perlas-Bernabe was born in Plaridel, Bulacan. She earned her Bachelor of Science in Commerce degree, major in Banking and Finance magna cum laude at St. Paul College of Manila and earned her law degree from the Ateneo de Manila Law School graduating as Class Salutatorian in 1976. She passed the Philippine Bar examination in 1977 with a bar rating of 85.156%.

== Early judicial posts ==
Perlas-Bernabe served the Judiciary as Regional Trial Court Judge of Makati from January 2000 to March 2004, Metropolitan Trial Court Judge of the same city from March 1996 to January 2000, and as Technical Assistant in the Office of the Court Administrator, Supreme Court of the Philippines from 1977 to 1979. She also worked in various private and government offices, namely, as legal assistant, legal department of China Banking Corporation (1979–1980); senior manager, legal department of Paramount Finance Corp. (1980–1987); legal manager, corporate secretary and legal consultant of the National Home Mortgage and Finance Corp. (1990–1993); and senior partner at Bernabe Perlas Morte and Associates (1993–1996).

== Supreme Court of the Philippines ==
Bernabe was the third appointee of President Benigno Aquino III to the Supreme Court of the Philippines as an associate justice on September 16, 2011. She replaced Conchita Carpio Morales, who retired from the Court on June 19, 2011, and later assumed the position of Ombudsman of the Philippines.

Legal offices
Preceded by Conchita Carpio-Morales	Associate Justice of the Supreme Court; 2011–2022	Succeeded by Maria Filomena Singh
Preceded by Antonio Carpio	Senior Associate Justice of the Supreme Court; 2019–2022	Succeeded by Marvic Leonen
