= Rosalinda Asuncion Vicente =

Former Associate Justice of the Philippine Court of Appeals

Associate Justice of the Philippine Court of Appeals
- In office July 16, 2003 – November 23, 2013
- Nominated by: JBC
- Appointed by: Gloria Macapagal Arroyo
- Preceded by: Hilarion Aquino
- Succeeded by: Maria Filomena Singh

Rosalinda Asuncion Vicente is an associate justice of the Philippine Court of Appeals, the second highest judicial court in the Philippines, next only to the Philippine Supreme Court.

== Early life and education ==
Vicente was born on November 23, 1943, in Tondo, Manila.

She earned degrees in Bachelor of Arts, magna cum laude, and Bachelor of Laws, cum laude, from the University of Santo Tomas, the oldest and largest Catholic university in Manila, Philippines.

== Career ==
Vicente started working for the Philippine government as a lawyer at the Land Registration Authority in 1969. Later, she was promoted to senior special attorney. In 1975, she was a state counsel at the Department of Justice. Soon, she was promoted as Assistant Chief State Counsel. Vicente worked as Associate Commissioner of the Professional Regulation Commission from 1989 to 1990. Soon, she was appointed as Associate Justice of the Philippine Court of Appeals.

== Academe ==
Vicente has been teaching in the University of Santo Tomas Faculty of Civil Law, the oldest law school in the country, for several years. She is currently a Law Professor, Bar Reviewer, and Coordinator of the Student Welfare and Development Board in the same institution.

== Private life ==
Vicente is married to Dr. Carlos Vicente, a practicing dentist. The couple has three children.
