= Roman Del Rosario =

Filipino jurist

The Honorable Roman G. Del Rosario
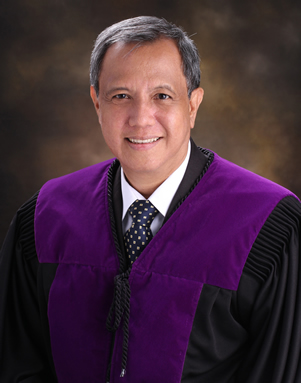
- Del Rosario official portrait

Presiding Justice of the Court of Tax Appeals
- In office March 13, 2013 – October 6, 2025
- Preceded by: Ernesto Acosta
- Succeeded by: Maria Belem Ringpis-Liban

Personal details
- Born: October 6, 1955 (age 70)
- Children: 3
- Education: University of Santo Tomas (A.B. Economics) University of the Philippines College of Law (LL.B.)
- Profession: Judge

Roman G. Del Rosario (born October 6, 1955) is a Filipino jurist who has served as the Presiding Justice of the Court of Tax Appeals (CTA) since his appointment on March 13, 2013. As Presiding Justice, he presides over the proceedings of the CTA En Banc and serves as Chairperson of the CTA First Division. He is also a member of the Board of Trustees of the Philippine Judicial Academy (PHILJA) and part of its Corps of Professors.

== Education ==
Del Rosario earned his undergraduate degree in A.B. Economics from the University of Santo Tomas and obtained his law degree from the University of the Philippines College of Law in 1981, passing the Philippine Bar Examination the same year with a rating of 85.55%. In 1998 and 2000, he attended and completed the Harvard Law School Program of Instruction for Lawyers.

== Career ==
=== Early legal career ===
Del Rosario began his career at the Bureau of Internal Revenue as Technical Assistant to the Planning and Policy Service Chief. In 1983, he joined the Office of the Solicitor General (OSG) as Trial Attorney I. He was promoted several times and in 1994 was appointed Assistant Solicitor General, with the rank of an Associate Justice of the Court of Appeals.

=== Anti-Money Laundering Council ===
From 2001 to 2010, Del Rosario headed the team representing the Anti-Money Laundering Council (AMLC), handling civil forfeiture cases, freezing of bank accounts, and bank inquiry proceedings. He attended several local and international conferences as speaker and participant on the role of the OSG in anti-money laundering litigation.

=== Special Committee on Naturalization ===
From June 2006 to March 2013, he served as Executive Director of the Special Committee on Naturalization, which processed and approved applications for administrative naturalization of aliens.

=== Court of Tax Appeals ===
On March 13, 2013, Del Rosario was appointed Presiding Justice of the Court of Tax Appeals. In this capacity, he presides over the CTA En Banc and the First Division.

=== Court Composition ===
The del Rosario Court was formed after He was appointed.

Note: Ang Blue the vertical blue line Denotes "now" (5 October 2026).

Bar Key:
Macapagal-Arroyo appointee Aquino III appointee Duterte appointee Marcos Jr. appointee

== Recognitions ==
- 2013 – Recognized by the Supreme Court for his role in drafting the Rules of Civil Procedure.
- 2014 – Recognized by the University of the Philippines College of Law for distinguished achievements and public service.
- 2016 – Recognized by the Office of the Ombudsman for his service as lecturer at the Multi-Sectoral Investment Forum.
- 2016 – Recognized by the AMLC for his contributions to the drafting of procedural rules and prosecution of anti-money laundering cases.

== Personal life ==
Del Rosario is married to Ma. Lourdes Filler, with whom he has three children: Benedetto, Lamara, and Laselina.
