= Ogie Narvasa =

Filipino lawyer and basketball executive

Gregorio Y. Narvasa II

3rd Commissioner of Metropolitan Basketball Association
- In office 2000–2001
- Preceded by: Ramon Fernandez
- Succeeded by: Butch Antonio

4th Commissioner of the Philippine Basketball League
- In office 1991–1992
- Preceded by: Andy Jao
- Succeeded by: Philip Ella Juico

Personal details
- Born: October 30, 1959 (age 67)
- Party: PDP (2026-present)
- Spouse: Ma. Cristine Charity Tutaan (died 2001)
- Parent: Andres Narvasa
- Relatives: Chito Narvasa (brother)
- Occupation: Lawyer, basketball league commissioner
- Basketball career

Career information
- College: Ateneo

Career history

Coaching
- 1985–1986: Ateneo

Gregorio Y. Narvasa II, also known as Ogie Narvasa, is a Filipino lawyer, basketball commissioner and coach. He is the son of Andres Narvasa, a former Chief Justice of the Supreme Court of the Philippines, and Janina Yuseco. Aside from practicing law, Narvasa was the commissioner of the Philippine Basketball League, the country's top amateur league, and the professional Metropolitan Basketball Association.

He is currently serving as legal counsel of the Philippine Basketball Association. He is the father of lawyer Carlo Joaquin Narvasa, with both of them serving as defense counsels in the 2026 impeachment trial of Vice President Sara Duterte.

== See also ==
- Andres Narvasa
- Philippine Basketball League
- Metropolitan Basketball Association

Preceded by Andy Jao	Philippine Basketball League Commissioner; 1991-1992	Succeeded by Philip Ella Juico
Preceded by Ramon Fernandez	Metropolitan Basketball Association Commissioner; 2000-2001	Succeeded by Butch Antonio
