= Maria Rowena Modesto-San Pedro =

Filipino lawyer and academic

The Honorable Maria Rowena Modesto-San Pedro
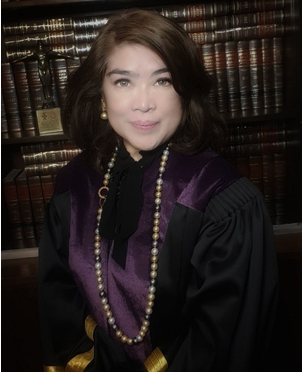

Associate Justice of the Court of Tax Appeals
- Incumbent
- Assumed office July 11, 2019
- Preceded by: Cesar A. Casanova

Personal details
- Born: Maria Rowena G. Modesto; August 21, 1964 (age 62) Philippines
- Spouse: Augusto A. San Pedro Jr.
- Children: 2
- Education: University of the Philippines College of Mass Communication (BA, cum laude); University of the Philippines College of Law (LLB, Top 20 of batch)
- Occupation: Judge, professor

Maria Rowena Modesto-San Pedro (born August 21, 1964) is a Filipino lawyer, academic, and jurist who currently serves as Associate Justice of the Court of Tax Appeals (CTA). She was appointed to the court on July 11, 2019, by President Rodrigo Duterte.

== Early life and education ==
San Pedro studied at the Assumption Convent for grade school and high school. She graduated cum laude with a degree of Bachelor of Arts in communications, major in Broadcast Communications, from the University of the Philippines College of Mass Communication. She later entered the University of the Philippines College of Law, graduating as part of the Top 20 of her batch.

== Legal and early professional career ==
Before joining the judiciary, San Pedro worked in private practice with various law offices and corporations. She was a legal researcher at the Fiscal Administration Foundation Incorporated, Office of former Commission on Audit Chairman Francisco Tantuico Jr., and a legal officer at the Quezon City Council under former councilor Francisco P. N. Pangilinan.

She also worked as a Court Attorney in both the Court of Appeals of the Philippines and the Supreme Court of the Philippines.

== Judicial career ==
San Pedro was appointed as judge of the Metropolitan Trial Court and later the Regional Trial Court in Pasig, where she presided over both family and commercial court cases.

In 2011, she was honored by the Supreme Court of the Philippines, in cooperation with the Society for Judicial Excellence, as one of three outstanding judges for that year.

On July 11, 2019, she was appointed Associate Justice of the Court of Tax Appeals.

== Academic and professional work ==
San Pedro has been active in judicial education and training. She ranked first in the Second Pre-Judicature Program given by the Philippine Judicial Academy (PHILJA) and now serves as a Professorial Lecturer in its Commercial Law Department and Committee on Curriculum Review.

She also lectures at the Ateneo Law School on Court Practice and Trial Technique. Her international training includes being a Fellow of the Commonwealth Judicial Education Institute in Canada, attendance at the Intellectual Property Summer Institute of the Center for Advanced Study and Research on Intellectual Property (CASRIP) at the University of Washington School of Law in Seattle, and programs organized by the U.S. Department of State on prosecuting terrorism and organized crime.

San Pedro has participated in various technical working groups and Supreme Court committees, including those on cybercrime warrants, intellectual property rights cases, revision of civil procedure rules, court forms, and continuous trial guidelines.

She has lectured extensively in the Philippines and abroad on cybercrime, intellectual property, gender issues, terrorism, and children's rights, including invitations from the World Intellectual Property Organization (WIPO) and United Nations agencies. She currently sits on the first advisory board of Judges of WIPO.

In 2012, she was commissioned by USAID and the American Bar Association to write a manual on the Financial Rehabilitation and Insolvency Act (FRIA) and highlights of the new rules on intellectual property rights procedure. She is also co-authoring a helpbook on trafficking in persons with the U.S. Department of Justice's Office of Prosecutorial Development, Assistance and Training.

== Personal life ==
Justice San Pedro is married to Augusto San Pedro Jr., a lawyer and professor at the University of the Philippines College of Law and Co-Managing Partner at Villaraza & Angangco Law Offices. They have two sons.

Legal offices
Preceded by Cesar Casanova	Associate Justice of the Court of Tax Appeals; 2018–present	Succeeded by incumbent
