= Maria Filomena Singh =

Filipino judge (born 1966)

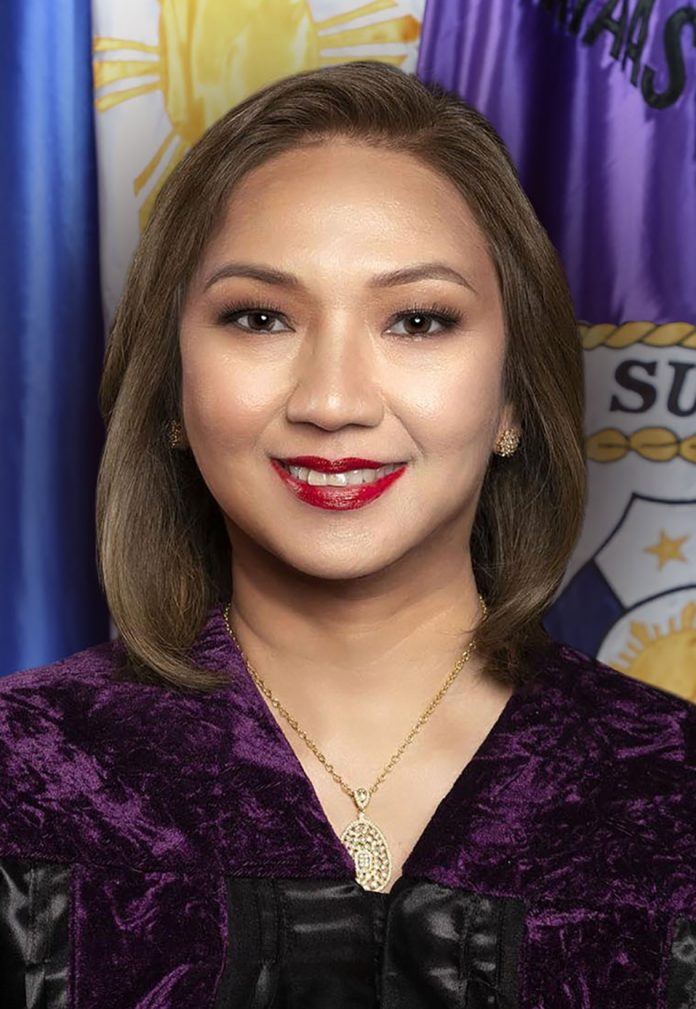
- Singh in December 2022

Associate Justice of the Supreme Court of the Philippines
- Incumbent
- Assumed office May 18, 2022
- Appointed by: Rodrigo Duterte
- Preceded by: Estela Perlas-Bernabe

Associate Justice of the Court of Appeals of the Philippines
- In office March 13, 2014 – May 18, 2022
- Appointed by: Benigno Aquino III
- Preceded by: Rosalinda Asuncion Vicente
- Succeeded by: Raymond Joseph Javier

Member of the Marikina City Council from the 2nd district
- In office June 30, 1998 – June 30, 2001

Personal details
- Born: Maria Filomena Dumandan Singh; June 25, 1966 (age 60)
- Other political affiliations: Liberal (2001); Lakas (1997–2001)
- Relations: Maria Rosario Vergeire (sister)
- Education: University of the Philippines Diliman (BA); Ateneo de Manila University (JD); American University (LLM)

Maria Filomena "Monette" Dumandan Singh (born June 25, 1966) is a Filipino judge who has served as associate justice of the Supreme Court of the Philippines since 2022.

== Early life and education ==
Maria Filomena Singh was born on June 25, 1966. She is the eldest of six children born to barangay chairman and political strategist Harry Francisco Macalanda Singh (1940–2020) and lawyer Clara Dizon Dumandan-Singh (1934–2021), both residents of Marikina. Her younger sister, Maria Rosario Singh-Vergeire, is a public health doctor who briefly served as Secretary of Health in an interim capacity.

She graduated from the University of the Philippines Diliman, cum laude, with a Bachelor of Arts in English major in imaginative writing. She earned a Juris Doctor from the Ateneo Law School with second honors distinction. She studied at the Washington College of Law of the American University in Washington, D.C., for a Master of Laws in International Legal Studies.

== Judicial career ==
Singh joined the Philippine judiciary in October 2002 as presiding judge of the Metropolitan Trial Court, Branch 31, in Quezon City, and was promoted to the Regional Trial Court of the same city in June 2007, to Branch 85 thereof.

She then served as an associate justice of the Court of Appeals of the Philippines from 2014 to 2022, succeeding Justice Rosalinda Asuncion-Vicente who retired in November 2013. She previously served as the senior member in the 3rd Division of the Court of Appeals under the chairpersonship of Justice Fernanda Lampas-Peralta.

== Associate Justice of the Supreme Court ==
On May 18, 2022, Singh was appointed by President Rodrigo Duterte as an associate justice of the Supreme Court of the Philippines to fill the vacancy left by the retirement of Justice Estela Perlas-Bernabe. Singh is Duterte's last appointment to the Supreme Court.

On October 20, 2026, Singh authored the landmark En Banc decision in Del Socorro et al. v. Office of the Ombudsman (G.R. No. 254680, April 26, 2026), affirming that the Office of the Ombudsman possesses independent constitutional authority to investigate and prosecute public officials without waiting for a final Commission on Audit (COA) report. The case involved former Palawan provincial officials contesting administrative liability over procurement anomalies in the ₱2.572-billion Malampaya Fund project, arguing that a COA audit finding was a mandatory condition precedent to an anti-graft probe. Rejecting this claim, Singh clarified the distinct constitutional mandates of both bodies, holding that while the COA is an administrative auditing agency, the Ombudsman is empowered under Article XI, Section 13(1) of the 1987 Constitution and Republic Act No. 6770 to investigate any illegal or improper act of a public officer on its own initiative. Grounding her opinion in anti-corruption efficiency and institutional integrity, Singh warned that treating a pending COA audit as a suspensive condition to Ombudsman investigations would severely paralyze state accountability mechanisms, thereby affirming the dismissal and perpetual disqualification from public office of the erring local officials.

== Interpretation of the Anti-VAWC Act ==
Some controversies have focused on Singh's interpretation of Republic Act No. 9262, also known as the Anti-Violence Against Women and Their Children Act (Anti-VAWC Act). In her separate concurring opinions and public statements, Singh has argued that the statute should be understood as a compensatory, gender-specific measure, and that its interpretation should be grounded in addressing structural inequalities within intimate relationships. Within this framework, she has supported, in certain circumstances, a reduced emphasis on traditional criminal law requirements regarding mens rea, and has opposed gender-neutral interpretative approaches, arguing that such approaches may weaken the law's preferential protection for women.

These interpretative positions were met with direct opposition from members of the Supreme Court. In G.R. No. 252739, Justice Alfredo Benjamin Caguioa explicitly criticized the reasoning advanced by Singh in his dissenting opinion. Caguioa argued that introducing policy considerations aimed at correcting marital or gender power imbalances into criminal adjudication risks amounting to "judicial legislation" and undermining the principles of mens rea and legality in criminal law. His dissent characterized aspects of the reasoning as "absurd" and employed the metaphor of a "feminist pendulum" to caution that excessive reliance on gender policy objectives could increase uncertainty in criminal norms and raise the risk of unjust convictions. Academic commentators have also engaged in discussions and critiques concerning these interpretative issues.

== Personal life ==
Singh has at least one child. In 2026, Singh revealed that she had been undergoing treatment for cancer.

Legal offices
Preceded by Rosalinda Asuncion Vicente	Associate Justice of the Court of Appeals of the Philippines; 2014–2022	Vacant
Preceded by Estela Perlas-Bernabe	Associate Justice of the Supreme Court of the Philippines; 2022–present	Incumbent
