= Henry Tenedero =

Author, professor, and entrepreneur

Henry Soleta Tenedero
- Born: April 3, 1958 (age 68); Manila, Philippines
- Education: University of Santo Tomas; Asian Institute of Management; Harvard University
- Occupation: Professor
- Writing career
- Notable work: Breaking the IQ Myth

Henry Tenedero is an author, professor, education consultant, entrepreneur, and former youth leader in the Philippines. He is an active advocate and mentor at Go Negosyo and served as Vice President and President of the Philippine Marketing Association in 2011 and 2015 respectively. He was a former President of the UST Alumni Association, Inc. He represented the Filipino youth during Pope John Paul II's visit at the Pontifical University of Santo Tomas Manila in 1981.

He was a professorial lecturer at Oxford University, Georgetown University, and the United Nations International Learning Styles Center in New York City. He is currently serving as dean of St. Clare College of Caloocan.

== Books ==
- Breaking the IQ Myth
- Super Teacher Excellent in Teaching
- Aha! I Gotcha
- Impact of Learning-Style Instructional Strategies on Students' Achievement and Attitudes
