= Jean Marie Bacorro-Villena =

Filipino lawyer, jurist, and associate justice of Court of Tax Appeals

The Honorable Jean Marie Bacorro-Villena
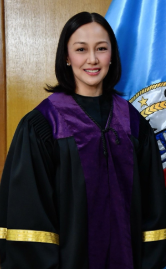

Associate Justice of the Court of Tax Appeals
- Incumbent
- Assumed office July 8, 2019
- Preceded by: Lovell Bautista

Personal details
- Born: Jean Marie Alcantara Bacorro; March 19, 1973 (age 53) Manaoag, Pangasinan, Philippines
- Spouse: Vincent L. Villena
- Children: 2
- Education: University of the Philippines (BA Mass Comm.) Arellano University School of Law (LLB)
- Occupation: Judge, professor

Jean Marie Alcantara Bacorro-Villena (born March 19, 1973) is a Filipino lawyer, academic, and jurist who currently serves as Associate Justice of the Court of Tax Appeals (CTA). Appointed at age 46 in 2019, she is noted as the youngest magistrate to join the CTA.

== Early life and education ==
Bacorro-Villena was born in Laoac, Pangasinan to physicians Arnulfo Bacorro and Ermelinda Alcantara-Bacorro. A consistent honor student, she graduated valedictorian in elementary school and first honorable mention in high school at the Holy Rosary Academy (now Colegio de San Juan de Letran, Manaoag).

She earned her Bachelor of Arts degree in Mass Communication, major in Journalism, from the University of the Philippines Diliman, where she was a dean's lister. She later obtained her Bachelor of Laws (LLB) degree from Arellano University School of Law in 2000 and was admitted to the Philippine Bar in 2001.

== Judicial career ==
Prior to her appointment to the CTA, Bacorro-Villena served the Philippine judiciary for more than 18 years. She began her career as a court attorney for Supreme Court Associate Justices Jose C. Vitug and Renato C. Corona.

In March 2008, she was appointed Presiding Judge of the Manila Metropolitan Trial Court (MeTC), Branch 6. Her branch maintained one of the lowest case dockets and she was nominated multiple times as one of the Outstanding First Level Court Judges. She was recognized by the City Government of Manila in 2011 as an Outstanding First Level Court Judge.

She was later promoted to Presiding Judge of the Manila Regional Trial Court (RTC), Branch 28 in April 2012. Her RTC docket consistently remained among the lowest in Manila, and in 2016 she was named Outstanding RTC Judge of the City of Manila. From 2017 to 2018, she was thrice recognized by the RTC Judges Association of Manila as one of its outstanding members.

On July 8, 2019, President Rodrigo Duterte appointed her as Associate Justice of the Court of Tax Appeals.

== Academic career ==
Apart from her judicial work, Bacorro-Villena has been teaching in the academe for more than 18 years. She has taught subjects such as Criminal Procedure, Public International Law, Insurance Law, Transportation and Public Service Law, Legal Writing, Legal Bibliography, and Practice Court.

She has also lectured for the Philippine Judicial Academy, served as a Bar reviewer in Remedial Law, and conducted Mandatory Continuing Legal Education (MCLE) lectures at institutions such as the UP College of Law, Ateneo Law School, and Arellano Law Foundation.

== Awards and recognition ==
- Outstanding First Level Court Judge – City Government of Manila (2011)
- Outstanding RTC Judge – City of Manila (2016)
- Special Citation – San Beda College of Law Alumni Association (2014)
- Commendations – Arellano University School of Law (2009, 2016); Colegio San Juan de Letran Manaoag

== Personal life ==
Justice Bacorro-Villena is married to Vincent L. Villena, Chief City Prosecutor of Taguig City. They have two daughters, Margaret Vience and Patricia Vience.

== Sources ==
This article incorporates text from a free content work. Licensed under public domain as a work of the Philippine government. Text taken from PHILJA In Pursuit of Judicial Excellence, 14, Government of the Republic of the Philippines, Philippine Judicial Academy.

Legal offices
Preceded by Lovell Bautista	Associate Justice of the Supreme Court of the Court of Tax Appeals; 2018–present	Succeeded by incumbent
