= Maria Ruth B. Pineda-Cortel =

Philippine scientist

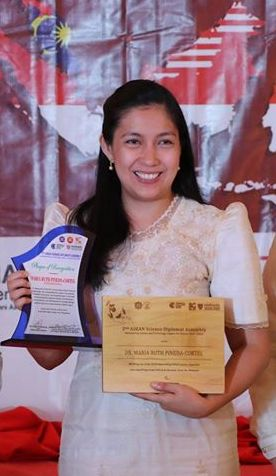
- Education: University of Santo Tomas (B.S., M.S., and Ph.D.)
- Known for: Gestational Diabetes mellitus, Climate change, dengue and malaria
- Awards: ASEAN-US Science Prize for Women 2020 (finalist)
- Scientific career
- Fields: Biological sciences and medical technology

Dr. Maria Ruth B. Pineda-Cortel is a full professor and laboratory coordinator at the University of Santo Tomas (UST) where she teaches at the Department of Medical Technology of the Faculty of Pharmacy. She also does research at the university's Research Center for the Natural Sciences and Applied Sciences (RCNAS). Pineda-Cortel has done extensive research focusing on gestational diabetes mellitus (GDM, also known as diabetes during pregnancy) and polyendocrine metabolic ovarian syndrome (PMOS) as a way to shed light on diseases that only affect women. As a woman of science, she advocates and works towards improving healthcare for women. Pineda-Cortel has also done research covering many health-related issues that include the effects of climate change on infectious diseases that are prevalent in the Philippines, such as dengue and malaria.

== Education ==
Pineda-Cortel studied at the University of Santo Tomas in Manila, Philippines where she received all of her degrees: Bachelor of Science in Medical Technology, Master of Science in Medical Technology, and Doctor of Philosophy with a major in Biological Sciences.

== Career and research ==
=== Gestational Diabetes Mellitus ===
Pineda-Cortel focuses her research on early-detection and diagnosis of GDM in pregnant women in the Philippines. The prevalence of GDM in the Philippines is around 30%, and Pineda-Cortel aims to increase accessibility and availability of standard diagnostic and screening tests for GDM to prevent further health complications in the mother and the baby. Her goal is to find early genetic biomarkers that can be identified in pregnant women to prevent the development of GDM. She carries out her experiments by collecting blood samples every trimester from a group of pregnant women with no diabetes (non-GDM group) and another group of pregnant women that have diabetes before pregnancy and/or had GDM during past pregnancies (GDM group). The RNA from the blood samples are then analyzed through differential gene expression to compare the read counts of relevant genes between the non-GDM group and the GDM group during first, second, and third trimester. In one of her studies, she concludes that the gene variant rs7754840 of the CDKAL1 gene (known to inhibit insulin production) does not increase susceptibility to GDM. Another one of her studies also suggests that iron deficiency anemia in pregnant women decreases the risk of developing GDM. Pineda-Cortel's research is an effort to end the cycle of transgenerational diabetes as its prevalence continues to increase all over the world.

=== Dengue and climate change ===
Pineda-Cortel also does research to determine the effects of climate change and other environmental factors on dengue incidence and number of cases per region. Her studies show a strong correlation between the incidence of dengue and temperature, rainfall and humidity. Because the Philippines lie in the tropics, these three climate variables are the main driving force of dengue fever. Warmer temperatures speed up the extrinsic incubation period of the dengue virus and the development of mosquitoes which increases disease transmission rates. In addition, her research also demonstrates that rainfall contributes to an increase in dengue cases as stagnant water provides breeding grounds for mosquitoes. With these contributing factors in mind, Pineda-Cortel developed prediction models of dengue cases in four studied regions in the Philippines.

== Selected publications ==
- Villavieja, Adrian; Pineda-Cortel, Maria Ruthb.; Baybayan, Karlo; Bello, Peterlouie; Camenforte, Latiffalois; Ching, Stefanyjane; Conti, Kathleen; Ignacio, Jeremiahjose; Diaz, Jiovanni; Pandac, Jefferylkae; Alejandro, Emilynu (2021). "Genetic association of rs7754840 and rs7756992 polymorphisms in the CDKAL1 gene and gestational diabetes mellitus in selected Filipino pregnant women". Asian Pacific Journal of Reproduction. 10 (4): 155. doi:10.4103/2305-0500.321123. S2CID 236483869.
- Pineda-Cortel, Maria Ruth B.; Bunag, Jose Angelo A.; Mamerto, Therriz P.; Abulencia, Miguel Francisco B. (2021). "Differential gene expression and network-based analyses of the placental transcriptome reveal distinct potential biomarkers for gestational diabetes mellitus". Diabetes Research and Clinical Practice. 180 109046. doi:10.1016/j.diabres.2021.109046. PMID 34530062. S2CID 237545700.
- Alejandro, Emilyn U.; Mamerto, Therriz P.; Chung, Grace; Villavieja, Adrian; Gaus, Nawirah Lumna; Morgan, Elizabeth; Pineda-Cortel, Maria Ruth B. (2020). "Gestational Diabetes Mellitus: A Harbinger of the Vicious Cycle of Diabetes". International Journal of Molecular Sciences. 21 (14): 5003. doi:10.3390/ijms21145003. PMC 7404253. PMID 32679915.
- Tiongco, R.E.; Paragas, N.A.; Dominguez, M.J.; Lasta, S.L.; Pandac, J.K.; Pineda-Cortel, M.R. (2020). "ABO blood group antigens may be associated with increased susceptibility to schistosomiasis: A systematic review and meta-analysis". Journal of Helminthology. 94: e21. doi:10.1017/S0022149X18001116. PMID 30526698. S2CID 54472613.
- Pineda-Cortel, Maria Ruth B.; Cabantog, Rachel Joy R.; Caasi, Paulo M.; Ching, Charles Anson D.; Perez, Joseph Benjamin S.; Godisan, Paulo Gabriel M.; Latorre, Cheska Marie G.; Lucero, Danielle R.; Salonga, Reginald B. (2019). "Larvicidal and ovicidal activities of Artocarpus blancoi extracts against Aedes aegypti". Pharmaceutical Biology. 57 (1): 120–124. doi:10.1080/13880209.2018.1561727. PMC 6383622. PMID 30776315.
- Tiongco, Raphael Enrique; Arceo, Engracia; Clemente, Benjie; Pineda-Cortel, Maria Ruth (2019). "Association of maternal iron deficiency anemia with the risk of gestational diabetes mellitus: A meta-analysis". Archives of Gynecology and Obstetrics. 299 (1): 89–95. doi:10.1007/s00404-018-4932-0. PMID 30315412. S2CID 52973732.
- Pineda-Cortel, Mariaruth B.; Clemente, Benjiem; Nga, Phamthi Thanh (2019). "Modeling and predicting dengue fever cases in key regions of the Philippines using remote sensing data". Asian Pacific Journal of Tropical Medicine. 12 (2): 60. doi:10.4103/1995-7645.250838. S2CID 92837751.

== Awards and recognition ==
Year	Title	Institution	Ref.
2021	Educators Excellence Award in Research	Philippine Association of Schools of Medical Technology	
2020	ASEAN-U.S. Science Prize for Women National Finalist	Association of Southeast Asian Nations	
2018	ASEAN Science Diplomat	Association of Southeast Asian Nations	
2016	Gawad Pananaliksik (Outstanding Performance in Research)	University of Santo Tomas Faculty of Pharmacy	
2014-2015	Crisanto Almario Research Award – Most Outstanding Researcher in the field of Medical Technology	Philippine Association of Medical Technologists, Inc.	
