= Monina Arevalo Zenarosa =

Monina Arevalo-Zenarosa

Commissioner, Commission on Human Rights
- Incumbent
- Assumed office March 23, 2023

Associate Justice of the Philippine Court of Appeals
- In office March 15, 2004 – August 22, 2009
- Appointed by: Gloria Macapagal Arroyo
- Preceded by: Buenaventura J. Guerrero
- Succeeded by: Pamela Ann Abella-Maximo

Personal details
- Born: 22 August 1939 (age 87) Masbate, Philippines
- Education: University of Santo Tomas (LLB); Far Eastern University (LLM)

Monina Arevalo Zenarosa (born August 22, 1939) is a retired Associate Justice of the Philippine Court of Appeals. The Court of Appeals is the second highest judicial court in the Philippines, next to the Supreme Court of the Philippines. She was appointed as a commissioner of the Commission on Human Rights in March 2023.

She served as the chairperson of the Independent Commission Against Private Armies, (a.k.a. "The Zenarosa Commission") created by then-President Gloria Macapagal Arroyo, tasked with dismantling private armed groups in the Philippines. Additionally, she held the position of Commissioner of the Presidential Anti-Graft Commission of the Philippines.

== Early life and education ==
Zenarosa was born in 1939 in Masbate. She earned her Bachelor of Laws degree from the University of Santo Tomas Faculty of Civil Law in 1959, passing the Philippine Bar Examination in the same year at the age of 20. From 1961 to 1963, she pursued a Master of Laws at the Far Eastern University Institute of Law, completing its academic requirements.

Throughout her career, Zenarosa attended various legal seminars and conferences both locally and internationally, focusing on the application of specific laws and legal concerns. She also observed court proceedings in the United States, Europe, and Latin America.

She was the sixth among nine siblings, born to Dr. Salvador B. Arevalo and Concepcion Altarejos, a pharmacist.

== Career ==
Zenarosa began her judicial career in May 1990 as a Regional Trial Court (RTC) judge in Angeles City. She was later designated as the acting Presiding Judge of RTC Branch 80 in Quezon City from January 16 to March 31, 1992. In April 1992, she was appointed Presiding Judge of Branch 76 of the Quezon City RTC, which was later designated as a Special Criminal Court on May 3, 1996. She also served as the acting Presiding Judge of Branch 96 from April 22, 2003, until her appointment as Associate Justice of the Philippine Court of Appeals by President Gloria Macapagal Arroyo on March 15, 2004.

Before joining the judiciary, Zenarosa worked as a prosecutor for over 15 years in Quezon City, holding various key positions such as Deputized Tanodbayan Prosecutor, Chief of the Prosecution Division, Inquest Fiscal for the Anti-Narcotics Unit, Chief of the Review Division, Member of the Anti-Subversion Prosecution Panel, Member of the Anti-Obscenity Task Force, Special Attorney at the Office of the Solicitor General, and Chairperson of the Committee on Legal Affairs in the Quezon City Consultative Council. Earlier in her career, she served as Projects Officer for Legal Affairs in the Task Force on Human Settlements in 1974, Technical Assistant at the Abaca Development Board from 1966 to 1972, and Election Registrar in Mercedes, Camarines Norte from 1964 to 1966.

Throughout her career, Zenarosa received numerous accolades for her contributions to the legal profession. She was named Most Outstanding RTC Judge of 2003 by the Citizens Anti-Crime Assistance Group (CAAG) and received the Award for Judicial Excellence for 1997–1998 from Rotary International, District 3780. In 2009, she was conferred the Huwarang Ina Award in the Law and Judiciary Category by the National Mother’s Day and Father’s Day Council and the Ideal Parents and Family Foundation.

== Personal life ==
Zenarosa was married to Hernando P. Zenarosa (deceased), a retired diplomat and journalist. They had five children: Jose Salvador, currently with the Supreme Court; Dean Hernando, a physician, married to Mary Heidi Teves; Anna Karenina, a lawyer; Charisse Del Castillo (deceased); and Ernest, now based in New York City. She also has five grandchildren: Hans and Sabrina Del Castillo, as well as Deanne Margaret, Hern Thomas, and Francesco Antonio Zenarosa.
