= Court of Tax Appeals =

Special tax appellate collegial court in the Philippines

- Hukuman ng Apelasyon sa Buwis; Hukuman ng Pag-aapela sa Buwis
- Seal of the Court of Tax Appeals

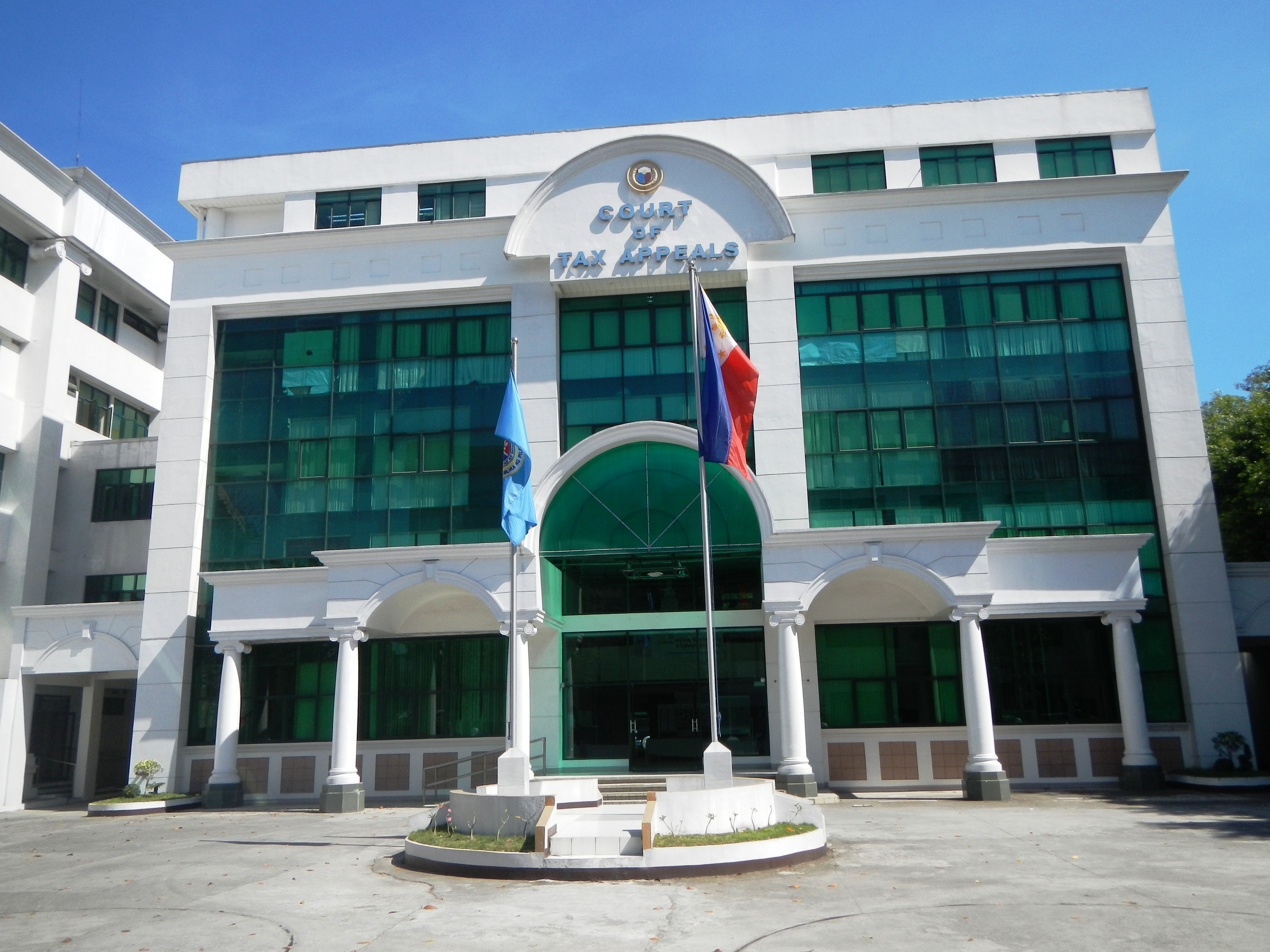
- Facade of the Court of Tax Appeals
- Established: June 16, 1954
- Jurisdiction: Philippines
- Location: Senator Miriam P. Defensor-Santiago Avenue, Diliman, Quezon City
- Composition method: Presidential appointment from the short-list submitted by the Judicial and Bar Council
- Authorized by: Republic Act No. 1125 and Republic Act No. 9282
- Appeals to: Supreme Court of the Philippines
- Appeals from: Regional Trial Courts
- Number of positions: 9
- Annual budget: ₱577.90 million (2020)
- Website: cta.judiciary.gov.ph

Presiding Justice
- Currently: Maria Belem Ringpis-Liban
- Since: December 17, 2025
- Lead position ends: February 25, 2027

The Court of Tax Appeals (Filipino: Hukuman ng Apelasyon sa Buwis) is the special court of limited jurisdiction, and has the same level with the Court of Appeals. The court consists of 8 Associate Justices and 1 Presiding Justice. The Court of Tax Appeals is located on Senator Miriam P. Defensor-Santiago Avenue (formerly Agham Road), Diliman, Quezon City in Metro Manila.

== History ==
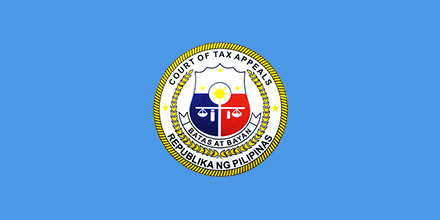
Flag of the Court of Tax Appeals

The Court of Tax Appeals was originally created by virtue of Republic Act No. 1125 which was enacted on June 16, 1954, composed of three (3) Judges with Mariano B. Nable as the first Presiding Judge. With the passage of Republic Act Number 9282 on April 23, 2004, the CTA became an appellate Court, equal in rank to the Court of Appeals. Under Section 1 of the new law, the Court is headed by a Presiding Justice and assisted by five (5) Associate Justices. They shall have the same qualifications, rank, category, salary, emoluments and other privileges, be subject to the same inhibitions and disqualifications and enjoy the same retirement and other benefits as those provided for under existing laws for the Presiding Justice and Associate Justices of the Court of Appeals. A decision of a division of the CTA may be appealed to the CTA en banc, and the latter's decision may further be appealed by verified petition for certiorari to the Supreme Court.

On June 16, 2019, the Court celebrated its 65th Founding Anniversary.

== Expanded jurisdiction ==
On June 12, 2008, Republic Act Number 9503 (R.A. 9503) was enacted and took effect on July 5, 2008. This enlarged the organizational structure of the CTA by creating a Third Division and providing for three additional justices. Hence, the CTA is now composed of one Presiding Justice and eight Associate Justices. The CTA may sit en banc or in three divisions with each division consisting of three justices. The CTA, as one of the courts comprising the Philippine Judiciary, is under the supervision of the Supreme Court of the Philippines.

Previously, only decision, judgment, ruling or inaction of the Commissioner of Internal Revenue, the Commissioner of Customs, the Secretary of Finance, the Secretary of Trade and Industry, or the Secretary of Agriculture, involving the National Internal Revenue Code and the Tariff and Customs Code on civil matters are appealable to the Court of Tax Appeals. The expanded jurisdiction transferred to the CTA the jurisdiction of the Regional Trial Courts and the Court of Appeals over matters involving criminal violation and collection of revenues under the National Internal Revenue Code and Tariff and Customs Code. It also acquired jurisdiction over cases involving local and real property taxes which used to be with the Regional Trial Court and the Court of Appeals.

== 2008 organizational expansion ==
Gloria Macapagal Arroyo on June 12, 2008, signed into law Republic Act 9503 (An Act Enlarging the Organizational Structure of the Court of Tax Appeals, Amending for the Purpose Certain Sections of the Law Creating the Court of Tax Appeals, and for Other Purposes), which added three more members (and one more division) to the court. The new law was enacted "to expedite disposition of tax-evasion cases and increase revenues for government to fund social services, food, oil and education subsidies and infrastructure".

== Current Justices ==
The Court of Appeals is currently composed of a Presiding Justice and Eight Associate Justices. Among the Incumbent members, Jean Marie Bacorro-Villena is the longest-serving Associate Justice, With a tenure of 2640 days (7 years, 114 days) as of October 30, 2026; the most recent justice to enter the court is Paolo Teston, whose and Debbie Jean Centeno-Dijamco tenure started on July 27, 2026 and June 28, 2026, respectively.

* Presiding Justice
* Associate Justice

Rank	Office	Name of Justice Birthdate and age	Appointment date	Appointing President	Retirement Date (70 years old)	Replacing
1	Maria Belen Ringpis-Liban; February 25, 1957 (age 69); Manila	Presiding Justice	17 December 2025	Marcos Jr.	25 February 2027	Del Rosario
2	Jean Marie Bacorro-Villena; March 19, 1973 (age 53); Manaoag, Pangasinan	Senor Associate Justice	8 July 2019	Duterte	19 March 2043	Bautista
3	Maria Rowena G. Modesto-San Pedro; August 21, 1964 (age 62); Makati City	Associate Justice	8 July 2019	Duterte	21 August 2034	Bautista
4	Marian Ivy F. Reyes-Fajardo; March 6, 1975 (age 51); Cagayan de Oro	Associate Justice	20 May 2021	Duterte	6 March 2045	Mindaro-Grulla
5	Lanee S. Cui-David; April 1, 1964 (age 62); Manila	Associate Justice	20 May 2021	Duterte	1 April 2034	Mindaro-Grulla
6	Corazon Ferrer-Flores; August 22, 1957 (age 69); Manila	Associate Justice	11 October 2022	Marcos Jr.	22 August 2027	Castañeda Jr.
7	Henry S. Angeles; July 23, 1978 (age 48); Manila	Associate Justice	26 September 2023	Marcos Jr.	23 July 2048	Piñera-Uy
8	Paolo Teston; April 19, 1974 (age 52)	Associate Justice	Jul 27, 2026	Marcos Jr.	Apr 19, 2044	Manahan
9	Debbie Jean Centeno-Dijamco; September 3, 1975 (age 51)	Associate Justice	July 29, 2026	Marcos Jr.	September 3, 1975	Ringpis-Liban

=== Divisions ===
Role	First Division	Second Division	Third Division
Chairperson	M. Ringpis-Liban; Presiding Justice	J. Bacorro-Villena; Senior Associate Justice	M. Modesto-San Pedro
Members	M. Reyes-Fajardo; H. Angeles	L. Cui-David; P. Teston*	C. Ferrer-Flores; D. Centeno-Dijamco*

== Court demographics ==
=== By law school ===
Law School	Total (Percentage)	Justices
UP	2 (22.22%)	M. Modesto-San Pedro; M. Ringpis-Liban Presiding Justice
ADMU	1 (11.11%)	M. Reyes-Fajardo
UE	1 (11.11%)	L. Cui-David
UST	1 (11.11%)	C. Ferrer-Flores
AUSL	2 (22.22%)	J. Bacorro-Villena Senior Associate Justice; H. Angeles
Vacant	1 Associate Justice vice Maria Belem Ringpis-Liban; Associate Justice vice Catherine T. Manahan	22.22%

=== By appointing President ===
President	Total	Percentage	Justices
Duterte	5	44.44%	J. Bacorro-Villena Senior Associate Justice; L. Cui-David; M. Modesto-San Pedro; M. Reyes-Fajardo
Aquino III	1	11.11%	M. Ringpis-Liban; Presiding Justice
Marcos Jr.	2	22.22%	C. Ferrer-Flores; H. Angeles
Vacant	2 AJ vice Maria Belem Ringpis Liban; AJ vice Catherine T. Manhattan	22.22%-->	

=== By gender ===
Gender	Total (Percentage)	Jusices
Male	1 (11.11%)	H. Angeles
Female	6 (77.78%)	J. Bacorro-Villena Senior Associate Justice; L. Cui-David; C. Ferrer-Flores; M. Modesto-San Pedro; M. Reyes-Fajardo; M. Ringpis-Liban Presiding Justice
Vacant	2	22.22%

=== By tenure ===
Year	Total Retiring	Justices
2027	2	M. Ringpis-Liban Presiding Justice; C. Ferrer-Flores
2034	1	M. Modesto-San Pedro
2038	1	L. Cui-David
2043	1	J. Bacorro-Villena; Senior Associate Justice
2045	1	M. Reyes-Fajardo
2048	1	H. Angeles

== Court of Tax Appeals Justices since June 11, 1954 ==
=== Presiding Judges and Justices ===
==== Presiding Judges ====
No.	Presiding Judge	Date of Appointment	Appointing President	Replacing	End of Term	Time in office
Presiding Judge
1	Mariano Nable	June 18, 1954	Magsaysay	First	January 10, 1965	10 years, 206 days
2	Teofilo Reyes Jr.	May 4, 1965	Macapagal	Nable	January 26, 1966	267 days
3	Roman Umali	May 23, 1966	Marcos Sr.	T. Reyes Jr.	January 17, 1976	9 years, 239 days
4	Amante Filler	June 21, 1980	Marcos Sr.	Umali	November 11, 1990	19 years, 143 days
5	Alex Reyes Jr.	November 21, 1990	Aquino	Filler	November 24, 1991	1 year, 3 days
6	Ernesto Acosta	March 13, 1992	Aquino	A. Reyes Jr.	April 26, 2004	12 years, 44 days

==== Presiding Justices ====
No.	Presiding Justice	Date of Appointment	Appointed by	Replacing	End of Term	Time in office
1	Ernesto Acosta	April 26, 2004	Macapagal-Arroyo	Himself as Presiding Judge	December 21, 2012	8 years, 239 days
2	Roman Del Rosario	March 13, 2013	Aquino III	E. Acosta	October 6, 2025	12 years, 207 days
3	Maria Belen Ringpis-Liban	December 17, 2025	Marcos Jr.	del Rosario	Incumbent	317 days

==== Timeline of Presiding Judges and Justices ====
Note: The blue vertical line denotes "today" (October 30, 2026). Bar Key:
Magsaysay appointee Macapagal appointee Marcos Sr. appointee C. Aquino appointee Aquino III appointee Marcos, Jr. appointee

=== Associate Judges and Justices ===
Associate Judge
No.	Justice	Date of appointment	Most recent office held prior to appointment	Appointed By	Succeeded	Term Ended	Time in office
1	Augusto Luciano	June 16, 1954	Assistant Solicitor, OSG	(new seat)	Magsaysay	January 10, 1965	10 years, 208 days
2	Roman Umali	August 27, 1955	Chief Counsel of the Bureau of Internal Revenue (BIR)	(new seat)	Magsaysay	May 29, 1966	10 years, 275 days
3	Alejandro Alfurong	June 18, 1965	Chief of the Law Division (Legal Department) of the Bureau of Internal Revenue	Luciano	Macapagal	January 17, 1966	213 days
4	Estanislao Alvarez	January 18, 1966	Chief of the Management and Planning Department of the Bureau of Internal Revenue	Alfurong	Marcos	January 26, 1976	10 years, 8 days
5	Ramon Avanceña	May 29, 1966	Assistant Solicitor General, Office of the Solicitor General	Umali	Marcos	January 26, 1976	9 years, 253 days
6	Amante Filler	June 30, 1976	Clerk of Court, CTA	Alvarez	Marcos	June 27, 1980	3 years, 363 days
7	Constante Roaquin	June 30, 1976	Chief Legal Officer and Technical Assistant to the Presiding Judge	Avanceña	Marcos	May 25, 1992	15 years, 330 days
8	Alex Reyes Jr.	June 27, 1980	Chief Tax Adviser and Special Assistant to the Secretary of Finance (DOF)	Filler	Marcos	November 21, 1990	10 years, 147 days
9	Ernesto Acosta	April 16, 1991	Vice-President - Legal at the Finasia Investment & Finance Corporation	Reyes	Aquino	March 13, 1992	332 days
10	Manuel Gruba	September 17, 1992	Senior Revenue Executive Assistant I	Acosta	Ramos	June 25, 1996	3 years, 282 days
11	Ramon De Veyra	September 17, 1992	Chief Legal Officer and Senior Executive Legal Officer, BIR	Roaquin	Ramos	February 26, 2001	8 years, 162 days
12	Amancio Saga	April 21, 1997	Regional Director IV, BIR	Gruba	Ramos	April 16, 2001	4 years, 360 days
13	Juanito Castañeda Jr.	October 1, 2001	Office of the State Prosecutor, Department of Justice	De Veyra	Macapagal-Arroyo	June 24, 2022	20 years, 265 days
14	Lovell Bautista	January 3, 2003	Private Lawyer	Saga	Macapagal-Arroyo	August 14, 2018	15 years, 223 days
15	Erlida Piñera-Uy	October 5, 2004	Presiding Judge of the Regional Trial Court (RTC), Branch 162, Pasig City (1999-2004)	(new seat)	Macapagal-Arroyo	May 28, 2023	18 years, 235 days
16	Olga Palanca-Enriquez	October 29, 2004	Presiding Judge of the Regional Trial Court (RTC), Branch 273, Marikina City (1995-2004)	(new seat)	Macapagal-Arroyo	December 14, 2012	8 years, 46 days
17	Cesar Casanova	November 3, 2004	Presiding Judge of the Regional Trial Court (RTC), Branch 83, Malolos, Bulacan (1995-2004)	(new seat)	Macapagal-Arroyo	September 9, 2018	13 years, 310 days
18	Esperanza Fabon-Victorino	November 27, 2009	Presiding Judge of the Regional Trial Court (RTC), Branch 157, Pasig City (1997-2009)	(new seat)	Macapagal-Arroyo	August 3, 2020	10 years, 250 days
19	Cielito Mindaro-Grulla	November 27, 2009	Executive Judge and Presiding Judge of the Regional Trial Court (RTC), Branch 29, Manila	(new seat)	Macapagal-Arroyo	June 17, 2020	10 years, 203 days
20	Amelia Cotangco-Manalastas	Executive Judge of the Pasig City Regional Trial Court Branch 268 (1994-2009)	December 15, 2009	(new seat)	Macapagal-Arroyo	September 11, 2016	6 years, 271 days
21	Maria Belen Ringpis-Liban	May 29, 2013	Presiding Judge of the Regional Trial Court (RTC), Branch 85, Malolos, Bulacan (1996-2013)	Palanca-Enriquez	Aquino III	December 17, 2025	12 years, 202 days
22	Catherine Triumfante- Manahan	December 6, 2016	Chief Legislative Officer to the Office of the Senate President, Senator Aquilino "Koko" Pimentel III	Cotangco-Manalasatas	Duterte	January 2, 2026	9 years, 28 days
23	Jean Marie Bacorro-Villena	July 8, 2018	Presiding Judge of the Regional Trial Court (RTC), Branch 28, Manila (2012-2020)	Bautista	Duterte	incumbent	8 years, 115 days
24	Maria Rowena Modesto-San Pedro	July 11, 2019	Presiding Judge of the Regional Trial Court (RTC), Branch 158, Pasig City (2007-2018)	Casanova	Duterte	incumbent	8 years, 111 days
25	Marian Ivy Reyes-Fajardo	May 20, 2021	Duterte	Private Lawyer	Mindaro-Grulla	incumbent	5 years, 163 days
26	Lanee S. Cui David	November 24, 2021	Deputy Commissioner of the Bureau of Internal Revenue (2016-2021)	Fabon-Victorino	Duterte	incumbent	4 years, 340 days
27	Corazon Ferrer-Flores	October 11, 2022	Deputy Clerk of Court and Chief of the Fiscal Management and Budget Office (FMBO), Supreme Court (2016-2022)	Castañeda Jr.	Marcos Jr.	incumbent	4 years, 19 days
28	Henry Angeles	September 26, 2023	Assistant Solicitor General, OSG (2016-2023)	Piñera-Uy	Marcos Jr.	present	3 years, 34 days

==== Timeline of Justices ====
Note: The blue vertical line denotes "today" (October 30, 2026).

Bar Key:
Magsaysay appointee Macapagal appointee Marcos appointee Aquino appointee Ramos appointee Macapagal-Arroyo appointee Aquino III appointee Duterte appointee Marcos. Jr. appointee

== Timeline Judges and Justices of the Court of Tax Appeals (since 1954) ==
=== Members of the Nable Court ===
Bar key:
Magsaysay appointee

=== Members of the T. Reyes Court (1965–1966) ===
Bar Key:
Magsaysay appointee Macapagal appointee

=== Members of the Umali Court (1966–1976) ===
Bar Key:
Marcos appointee

=== Members of the Filler Court (1980–1990) ===
Bar Key:
Marcos appointee

=== Members of the A. Reyes Court (1990–1991) ===
Bar Key:
Marcos appointee Aquino appointee

=== Members of the Acosta Court (1992–2012) ===
Bar key:
Marcos appointee Aquino appointee Ramos appointee Macapagal-Arroyo appointee

=== Members of the Del Rosario Court (2013-2025) ===
Note: Ang Blue the vertical blue line Denotes "now" (30 October 2026).

Bar Key:
Macapagal-Arroyo appointee Aquino III appointee Duterte appointee Marcos Jr. appointee

=== Members of the Ringpis-Liban Court (2025-Present) ===
Note: The Blue the vertical blue line Denotes "now" (30 October 2026).

Bar Key:
Duterte appointee Marcos Jr. appointee

== The rule of seniority ==
The Associate Justices of the Court are usually ordered according to the date of their appointment. There are no official ramifications as to this ranking, although the order determines the seating arrangement on the bench and is duly considered in all matters of protocol. Within the discretion of the Court, the ranking may also factor into the composition of the divisions of the Court.

The incumbent Justice with the earliest date of appointment is deemed the Senior Associate Justice. The Senior Associate Justice has no constitutional or statutory duties, but usually acts as Acting Presiding Justice during the absence of the Presiding Justice. The Senior Associate Justice is also usually designated as the chairperson of the second division of the Court.

The following became Senior Associate Justices in their tenure in the Court of Tax Appeals:

* Appointed as Supreme Court Associate Justice
* Appointed as CTA Presiding Justice

No.	Senior Associate Justice	Date Appointed	Tenure
1	Augusto Luciano	Jun 1954	Jun 1954–Mar 1965
2	Roman Umali*	Aug 1955	Mar 1965–May 1966*
3	Estanislao Alvarez	Jan 1966	May 1966–Jan 1976
4	Amante Filler*	Jun 1976	Jan 1976–Jun 1980*
5	Constante Roaquin	Jun 1976	Jun 1980–May 1992
6	Manuel Gruba	Sep 17, 1992	Sep 17, 1992–Jun 25, 1996
7	Ramon De Veyra	Sep 17, 1992	Jun 25, 1996–Feb 2001
8	Amacio Saga	Apr 1997	Feb 2001–Apr 2001
9	Juanito Castañeda Jr.	Oct 1, 2001	Oct 1, 2001–Jun 24, 2022
10	Erlinda Piñera-Uy	Oct 5, 2004	Jun 24, 2022–May 28, 2023
11	Maria Belen Ringpis-Liban*	May 17, 2013	May 28, 2023–Dec 17, 2025
12	Catherine Manahan	Dec 6, 2016	Dec 17, 2025–Jan 2, 2026
13	Jean Marie Bacorro-Villena	Jul 8, 2019	Jan 2, 2026–present

== See also ==
- Supreme Court of the Philippines
- Court of Appeals of the Philippines
- Sandiganbayan
- Philippines
- Political history of the Philippines
- Constitution of the Philippines
