= Andres Narvasa =

Chief Justice of the Philippines from 1991 to 1998

The Honorable Andres R. Narvasa
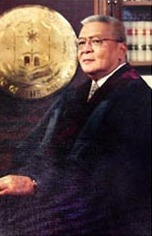
- Official Portrait of Chief Justice Narvasa

19th Chief Justice of the Supreme Court of the Philippines
- In office December 1, 1991 – November 30, 1998
- Appointed by: Corazon Aquino
- Preceded by: Marcelo Fernan
- Succeeded by: Hilario Davide Jr.

112th Associate Justice of the Supreme Court of the Philippines
- In office April 10, 1986 – December 1, 1991
- Appointed by: Corazon Aquino
- Preceded by: Buenaventura S. De La Fuente
- Succeeded by: Josue N. Bellosillo

Personal details
- Born: November 30, 1928 Manila, Philippine Islands
- Died: October 31, 2013 (aged 84) Quezon City, Philippines
- Resting place: Basilica of the National Shrine of Our Lady of Mount Carmel Crypt, Quezon City
- Spouse: Janina Yuseco
- Children: Andres "Chito" Narvasa, Jr. Raymundo "Ray" Narvasa; Gregorio Narvasa II; Socorro "Cory" Narvasa; Martin Narvasa; Regina Narvasa
- Education: University of Santo Tomas
- Affiliation: Gamma Delta Epsilon

Andres dela Rosa Narvasa (November 30, 1928 – October 31, 2013) was the Chief Justice of the Supreme Court of the Philippines from December 1, 1991, to November 30, 1998.

He served as chairman of the Preparatory Commission for Constitutional Reform, a special agency tasked to look into potentially positive amendments to the Philippine Constitution, from 1999 to 2000.

== Education ==
During his youth, Narvasa managed to excel in both academics and athletics. He was the captain of the University of Santo Tomas Intramural Basketball Team, as well as the top student in his class at the University of Santo Tomas Faculty of Civil Law.

Narvasa graduated elementary at Colegio de San Juan de Letran, 1938 (salutatorian), and secondary school at the Arellano High School, 1945 (valedictorian). He obtained his Bachelor of Laws, University of Santo Tomas in 1951 (magna cum laude), and received his Doctor of Laws (honoris causa), Pamantasan ng Lungsod ng Maynila on April 15, 1992, Doctor of Laws (honoris causa), University of Santo Tomas on November 21, 1992, and Doctor of Laws (honoris causa), Angeles University Foundation on April 1, 1993.

Narvasa graduated magna cum laude from the University of Santo Tomas Faculty of Civil Law, and placed second in the 1951 Philippine Bar Examinations, with a bar rating of 91.6%

== Career ==
Narvasa taught at the University of Santo Tomas Faculty of Civil Law. Soon, he became a full professor of law, and eventually Dean of the University of Santo Tomas Faculty of Civil Law|Faculty of Civil Law.

Narvasa started as a law practitioner in 1952, as head, Andres R. Narvasa & Associates. He then became professor of law, 1952, bar reviewer, 1959, legal counsel, University of Santo Tomas, 1973, dean, Faculty of Civil Law, University of Santo Tomas, 1967–1973, vice-rector for student affairs, University of Santo Tomas, 1969–1972, member of the board of trustees, University of Santo Tomas, 1974 and president of the Faculty Club, University of Santo Tomas, 1969.

Narvasa was appointed as the general counsel for the Agrava Fact-finding Commission, formed by then President Ferdinand Marcos and tasked to investigate the death of former senator and staunch Marcos critic Benigno Aquino Jr. The commission was chaired by former Philippine Court of Appeals Associate Justice Corazon Juliano-Agrava. As general counsel, Narvasa meticulously pieced together evidence to point out the military in the Aquino-Galman murders.

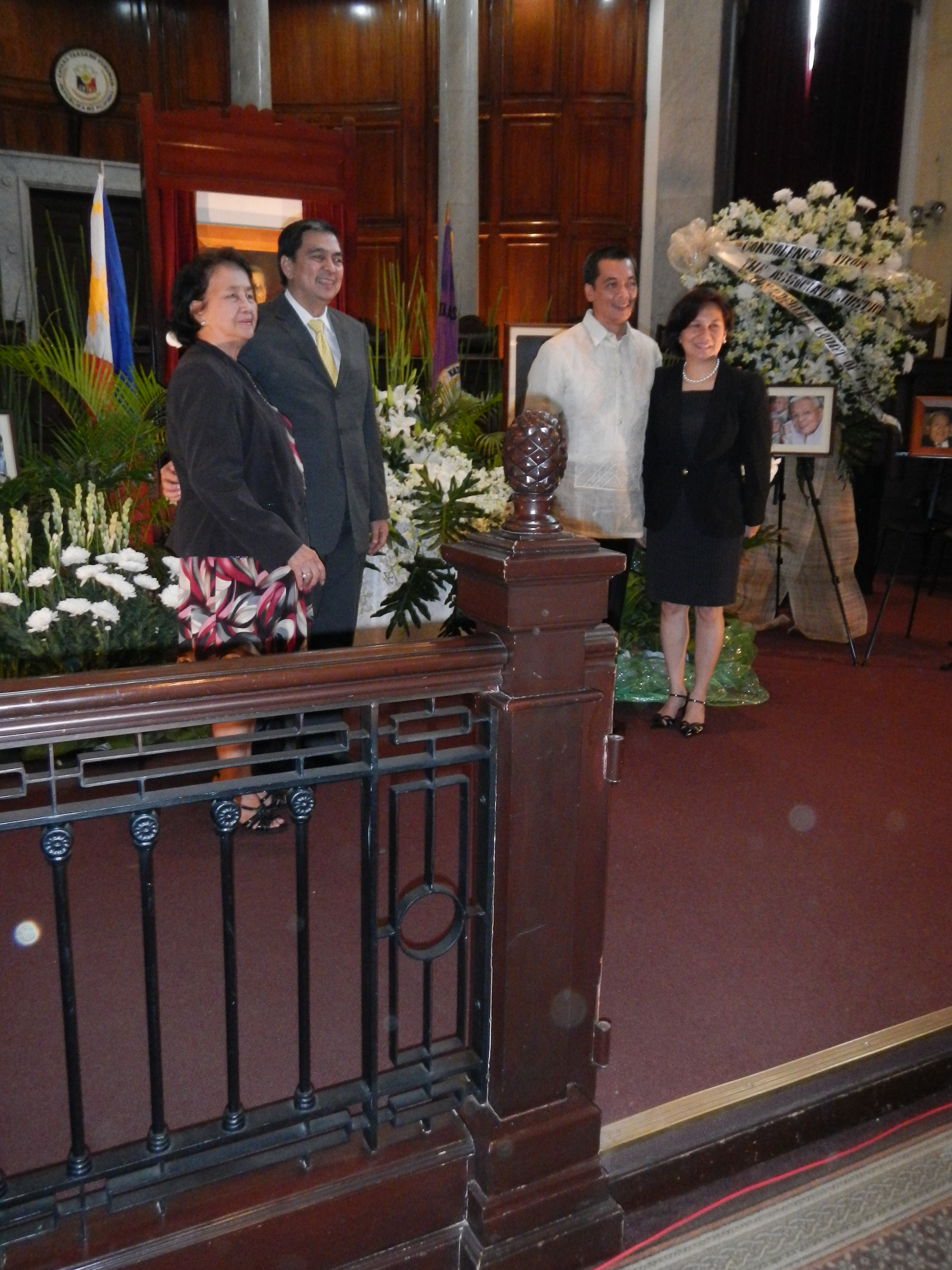
Family of CJ Andres Narvasa at his Eulogy.

President Corazon Aquino appointed Narvasa as associate justice of the Philippine Supreme Court on April 10, 1986. Narvasa served as associate justice until his appointment as chief justice on December 1, 1991, also by Aquino.

Narvasa administered the oath of office during the inaugurations of Philippine presidents Fidel V. Ramos and Joseph Estrada.

After his retirement in 1998, he was appointed by President Estrada to serve as chair of the Preparatory Commission for Constitutional Reform, an independent commission formed to study the basic charter and suggest potentially positive modifications. He served in this capacity from 1999 to 2000.

In November 2000, Narvasa became counsel for Estrada in his impeachment proceedings before the Philippine Senate.

== Private life ==
Married to Janina Yuseco, Narvasa has six children: Andres, Jr., Raymundo, Gregorio II, Socorro, Martin, and Regina. Narvasa's son, Andres, Jr., was Commissioner of the Philippine Basketball Association. Another son, Gregorio II, served as commissioner for both Philippine Basketball League and the Metropolitan Basketball Association, but now concentrates on practicing law. Narvasa and son, Gregorio, run the Fortun Narvasa & Salazar Law Office in partnership with Sigfrid A. Fortun and Roderick R.C. Salazar III.

== Awards ==
Narvasa received the following awards:

- Award of Distinction, University of Santo Tomas, February 28. 1972
- Award for Outstanding Achievements in Legal Education, Faculty of Civil Law, University of Santo Tomas, September 2, 1981
- Appreciation Certificate, UST College of Nursing, 1970
- Certificate of Appreciation and Recognition, 1st Summer Seminar on Educational Management, University of Santo Tomas, May 1972
- Appreciation Certificate, Faculty of Medicine and Surgery, University of Santo Tomas, August 11, 1973, Plaque of Appreciation, Faculty Association of UST, October 18, 1978
- Award for Meritorious Service, Faculty of Civil Law, September 2, 1981 & September 4, 1982
- Plaque of Appreciation, 1953 Law Class of UST, March 26, 1983
- Award as Most Outstanding Honor Graduate for 1983–1984 for exemplary public service, July 28, 1984
- Plaque of Merit as Most Outstanding Alumnus of Faculty of Civil Law, UST Alumni Foundation, Inc., September 1, 1984
- Papal Award Pro Ecclesia et Pontifice, May 1977
- Human Rights Award, Concerned Women of the Philippines, December 9, 1984
- Ninoy Aquino Movement for Freedom, Justice, Peace and Democracy of the United States of America, August 1985
- Knight Grand Cross of Rizal, June 19, 1992
- Outstanding Manilan '93, 422nd Araw ng Maynila Executive Committee, June 24, 1993

== See also ==
- Andres Narvasa, Supreme Court of the Philippines Eulogies

Legal offices
Preceded by Marcelo Fernan	Chief Justice of the Supreme Court of the Philippines; 1991–1998	Succeeded by Hilario Davide, Jr.
