= Damaskinos Gaganyaros =

Senior bishop of the Orthodox Church of Jerusalem

Archbishop Damaskinos of Jaffa and Arimathea (secular name Anastasios Gaganiaras) is a senior bishop of the Eastern Orthodox Patriarchate of Jerusalem and a current member of the Holy Synod of Jerusalem.

He was born in 1952 in Agia, Larissa. He became a monk in 1968, was ordained deacon (1970) and priest (1977), became archimandrite in 1980, and archbishop in 1998. He holds degrees from the University of Bethlehem and the University of Thessalonica, and has been on the faculty of the University of Thessalonica since 1984.
