= University of Santo Tomas Faculty of Civil Law =

Law school of the University of Santo Tomas

- Facultad de Derecho Civil (Spanish)
- Established: 1734; 292 years ago
- Dean: Atty. Nilo T. Divina, LL.B.
- Regent: Rev. Fr. Isidro Abano, O.P.
- Students: 700+ (as of 2015)
- Location: Main Building, UST, Sampaloc, Manila
- Patron saint: Saint Raymond of Peñafort
- Colors: Red
- Website: www.ustcivillaw.com

The University of Santo Tomas Faculty of Civil Law or "UST Law" (as distinguished from the Faculty of Canon Law) is a law school in Manila, Philippines. It is administered under the jurisdiction of the University of Santo Tomas, the oldest existing university in the Asia. It is one of the three law schools of the University of Santo Tomas in Manila, with the other two being the Faculty of Canon Law and the Graduate School of Law.

Established in 1734, it is the first lay law school in the Philippines. It is among the top performing and prestigious law schools in the Philippines, consistently topping the Bar Examinations. Jose Hontiveros, who graduated the university in 1911, holds the highest bar exam grade in the history of bar examinations in the Philippines. The faculty has produced numerous alumni in government, public service and the academe globally.

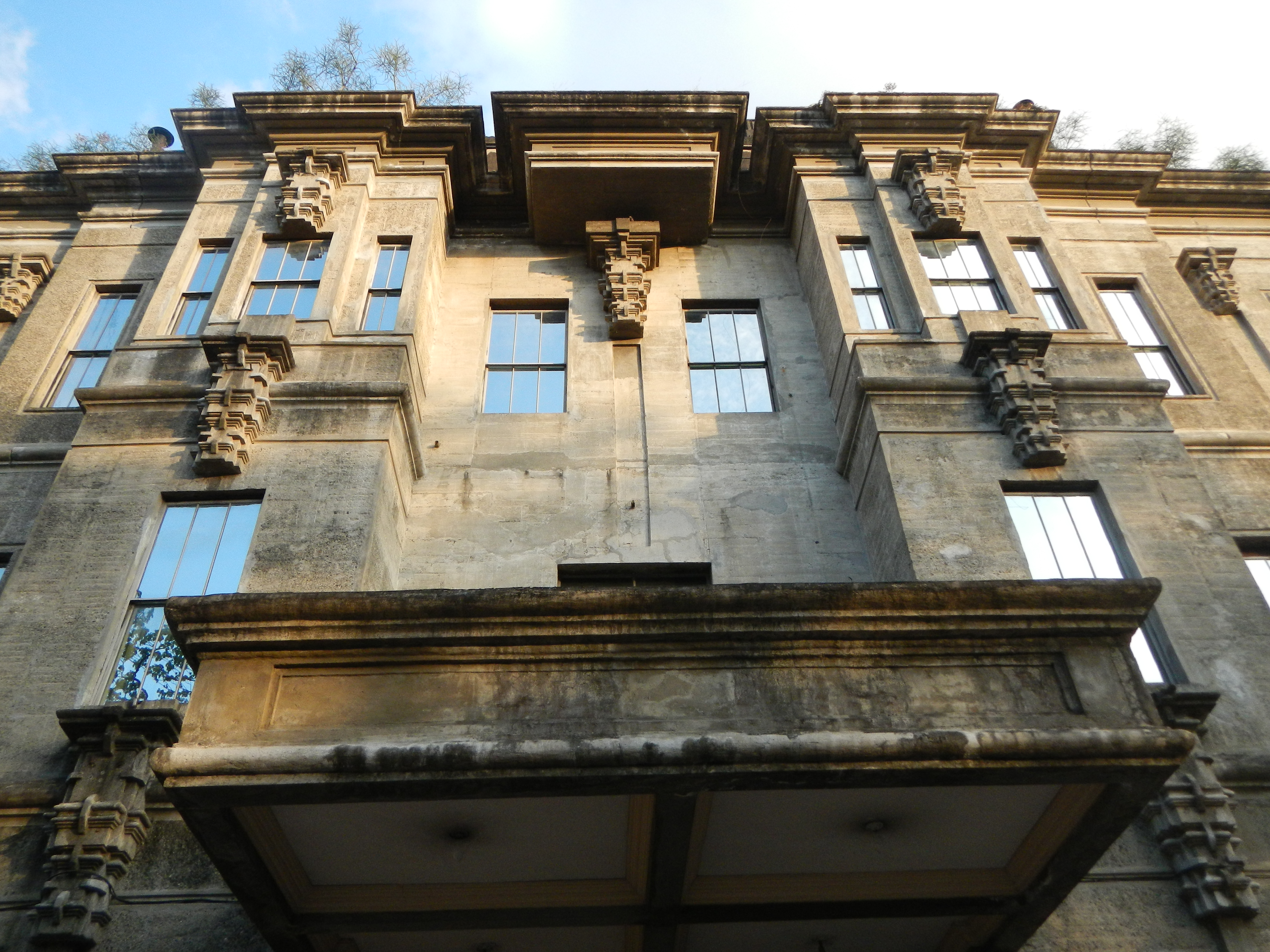
Facade of the UST Main Building which houses the Faculty of Civil Law

== History ==
Known as Facultad de Derecho Civil, the University of Santo Tomas Faculty of Civil Law is the oldest lay college in the university as well in the Philippines. It was established on September 2, 1734, the same year that the Faculty of Canon Law was founded, with a curriculum identical to that adopted during the time in leading universities in Europe.

The number of subjects in the curriculum was later enriched and expanded. During the major part of the Spanish regime the course consisted of twelve semesters (six years), based upon a year of preparatory work.

On several occasions during the American regime, the University of Santo Tomas modified the curriculum of the Faculty of Civil Law in order to meet the changing conditions. But firm in the resolve of turning out worthy members of the Bar and practical Catholic lawyers, the university adhered to its basic policy of retaining in its curriculum important subjects introduced during the Spanish regime in order to fully accomplish the aims and purposes of a sound Catholic legal education.

== Curriculum ==
The Faculty maintains a curriculum of mandatory law courses, focusing on the eight subjects covered in the Philippine Bar Examinations. Upon completing all law courses for the first three years in the program, the student is required to engage in an internship program of at least two-hundred hours before being admitted to the fourth and final year.

As a final graduation requirement, a student undergoes a Revalida, an oral recitation covering the most important aspects of every subject in the Philippine Bar Examinations. An applicant for graduation must pass the Revalida, Mid-term Examinations, Final Examinations, daily class recitations, quizzes, and special projects to graduate and be qualified to take the Philippine Bar Exam.

The Faculty remains one of the top performing law schools in the national bar exams.

== Preparatory legal education ==
The Faculty requires applicants to hold at least a bachelor's degree in any field, provided they meet certain academic requisites. Majority of graduates have completed preparatory law degrees in Asian Studies, Media Studies, Sociology, Legal Management, Political Science, Accountancy, and Philosophy.

== Advanced legal education ==
Since 2017, University of Santo Tomas started offering higher law degrees through the UST Graduate School of Law. Prior this, the Faculty of Civil Law, through the University of Santo Tomas Graduate School Law Department administers the program content and delivery of advanced courses in legal education. These postgraduate programs are made available only to holders of Bachelor of Laws and Juris Doctor degrees from accredited law schools in the Philippines and other countries.

The following postgraduate programs were offered:

- Master of Laws (LL.M.) - postgraduate legal education for holders of basic law degrees (i.e., Bachelor of Laws, Bachelor of Science in Law, Juris Doctor, etc.) who are members of the bar and active legal practitioners or academicians in their respective countries.
- Doctor of Civil Law (DCL) - the first and so far only doctoral program in law offered in the Philippines. Notable alumni include Supreme Court Late Chief Justice Renato Corona, late Manila Mayor Ramon D. Bagatsing Sr. and Sandiganbayan Justice Catalino R. Castañeda Jr.

== Alumni ==
This is a list of notable alumni of the school.

- Manuel L. Quezon, 2nd President of the Philippines; 4th placer (87.83%), 1903 Bar Exams
- José P. Laurel, 3rd President of the Philippines
- Sergio Osmeña, 4th President of the Philippines; 2nd placer (95.66%), 1903 Bar Exams
- Diosdado Macapagal, 9th President of the Philippines; 1st placer (89.85%), 1936 Bar Exams
- Fernando Lopez, 4th Vice President of the Philippines
- Emmanuel Pelaez, 7th Vice President of the Philippines
- Arturo Tolentino, 9th Vice President of the Philippines
- Jose Hontiveros, former Senator of the Insular Government of the Philippine Islands; former Associate Justice of the First Supreme Court of the Philippines; former Associate Justice of the Court of Appeals; former 1934 Constitutional Convention delegate; former governor of Capiz; 1st placer (98%), 1911 Bar Exams
- Cayetano Arellano, former Chief Justice of the Supreme Court of the Philippines
- Victorino Mapa, former Chief Justice of the Supreme Court of the Philippines
- Manuel Araullo, former Chief Justice of the Supreme Court of the Philippines
- Ramón Avanceña, former Chief Justice of the Supreme Court of the Philippines
- Roberto Concepcion, former Chief Justice of the Supreme Court of the Philippines; 1986 Constitutional Commission Member; 1st placer (89.1%), 1924 Bar Exams
- Andres Narvasa, former Chief Justice of the Supreme Court of the Philippines; 2nd placer, 1951 Bar Exams
- Renato Corona, former Chief Justice of the Supreme Court of the Philippines
- Apolinario Mabini, former Prime Minister of the Philippines
- Marcelo H. del Pilar, revolutionary leader of the Philippine Revolution
- Emilio Jacinto, revolutionary leader
- Gregorio S. Araneta, former member of the Revolutionary Congress, former Associate Justice in the first Supreme Court, former Secretary of Justice
- Felipe G. Calderón, known as the "Father of the Malolos Constitution"
- Felipe Agoncillo, representative to the negotiations in Paris that led to the Treaty of Paris (1898), ending the Spanish–American War
- Epifanio de los Santos, Filipino historian, literary critic, jurist, prosecutor
- José W. Diokno, former senator and Secretary of Justice; 1st placer (95.3%), 1944 Bar Exams
- Claro M. Recto, former Senator
- José Avelino, former Senator
- Arsenio Lacson, former mayor of the City of Manila, former Congressman
- Gregorio Aglipay, first Filipino Supreme Bishop of the Philippine Independent Church
- Ladislao Diwa, Filipino patriot, one of the founders of the Katipunan that initiated the Philippine Revolution against Spain
- Baldomero Aguinaldo, former cabinet member, revolutionary leader of the Magdalo chapter of the Katipunan
- Angelina Sandoval-Gutierrez, Associate Justice of the Philippine Supreme Court
- Raul Gonzales, Philippine Secretary of Justice, former Iloilo Representative and Special Prosecutor (Tanodbayan)
- Diosdado Peralta, Chief Justice of the Supreme Court of the Philippines, former Sandiganbayan Presiding Justice
- Amy Lazaro-Javier, Associate Justice of the Supreme Court of the Philippines, former Court of Appeals Associate Justice
- Rosalinda Asuncion Vicente, Associate Justice of the Court of Appeals
- Monina Arevalo Zenarosa, Associate Justice of the Court of Appeals
- Ernesto L. Pineda, former Undersecretary of the Department of Justice
- Vicente A. Mayo, former Governor of Batangas
- Arlene M. Maneja, 1st placer (92.9%), 2002 Bar Exams
- Ephraim P. Bie, 1st placer (89.2625%) 2023 Bar Exams

== Faculty ==
The faculty has a pool of full-time law professors and part-time professorial lecturers from both the public and private sectors. Most have held high positions in the judiciary and other branches of the Philippine government.

== See also ==
- Legal education in the Philippines
- Philippine Bar Examinations
- University of Santo Tomas
- Gamma Delta Epsilon
