= University of Santo Tomas Faculty of Arts and Letters =

Liberal arts school of the University of Santo Tomas

- Fakultad ng Sining at Panitik (Filipino)
- Former names: 1896 – Facultad de Filosofía y Letras; 1926 – College of Liberal Arts; 1964 – Faculty of Arts and Letters (Absorption of the Liberal Arts degrees from the College of Liberal Arts)
- Established: 1896
- Dean: Melanie D. Turingan-Marcos, Ph.D.
- Regent: Rev. Fr. George Phe Mang, O.P.
- Students: 4,664 (as of 2026)
- Location: St. Raymund de Peñafort Building, Quezon Drive, UST, Sampaloc, Manila
- Newspaper: The Flame
- Patron saint: Saint Thomas More
- Colors: Navy blue
- Nickname: Artlets or AB
- Mascots: Athena and Glaucus / Mulat the Owl

The University of Santo Tomas Faculty of Arts and Letters, popularly known as "UST Artlets" or "UST AB", is the liberal arts school of the University of Santo Tomas, the oldest and the largest Catholic university in Manila, Philippines.

Established in 1896 with the name Facultad de Filosofía y Letras, following Spanish tradition, the faculty is the first and oldest liberal arts tertiary school in the Philippines. It offers a Bachelor of Arts degree in different areas of Media Studies, Social Sciences and Humanities. It is proclaimed to be a Center of Excellence in Philosophy and a Center of Development in Communication, Literature, and in Journalism by the Commission on Higher Education.

== History ==
The University of Santo Tomas started offering courses in liberal arts and philosophy since its foundation in 1611. These courses were later institutionalized with the establishment of the Faculty of Philosophy and Letters in 1896. A College of Liberal Arts was also established in 1926 which was known for its preparatory courses for Law and Medical schools.

The College of Liberal Arts was divided into Arts and Pure Sciences. The Pure Sciences department diversified due to scientific advancements in the era and has since developed into the UST College of Science. Consequently, the College of Liberal Arts merged with the Faculty of Philosophy and Letters in 1964, thus modifying the faculty's name into "Arts and Letters".

At its onset, the faculty offered a limited number of programs—Associate in Arts (A.A.), Bachelor of Arts (A.B.), Bachelor of Literature (Litt. B.), and Bachelor of Philosophy (Ph. B.). In later years, new courses and majors gradually developed.

In 1971, the faculty started offering Bachelor of Arts degree programs in Asian Studies, Behavioral Science (originally Liberal Arts-Commerce), Communication Arts, Economics, Journalism, Literature, Philosophy, Political Science, Sociology, and Translation. The A.B. major in Translation was eventually phased out due to lack of enrollment and funding.

In 1994, the faculty started offering a major in Legal Management, an interdisciplinary degree program in business management and law designed to suit the needs of students intending to go to law school after graduation with intentions to have other career prospects.

In 2002, the faculty teamed up with the UST College of Education to offer a double degree—Bachelor of Arts-Bachelor of Secondary Education major in Social Sciences/Studies (AB-BSE). The program was discontinued in 2007 because of government regulations that would stretch the time to complete the AB-BSE degree to at least 5 years and 4 summers.

In June 2011, the faculty started offering A.B. History and A.B. English Language Studies; and in August 2018, the faculty started offering A.B. Creative Writing.

The faculty is set to offer A.B. Modern Languages in 2028, with Spanish and French as its initial specializations.

== Deans ==
DEANS
UST FACULTY OF PHILOSOPHY AND LETTERS
1927 – Fr. Manuel Arellano, O.P. 1928 – Fr. Juan Sanchez, O.P. 1932, 1933 – Fr. Julio Vicente, O.P. 1933–1938 – Fr. Eugenio Jordan, O.P. 1938–1939 – Fr. Ciriaco Pedrosa, O.P.	1939–1946 – Fr. Evergisto Bazaco, O.P. 1946–1952 – Fr. Juan Labrador, O.P.	1952–1953 – Fr. Evergisto Bazaco, O.P. 1953–1964 – Fr. Alfredo Panizo, O.P.
UST FACULTY OF ARTS AND LETTERS
1964–1969 – Fr. Tomas Martinez, O.P. 1969–1976 – Fr. Frederik Fermin, O.P. 1976–1987 – Magdalena Alonso-Villaba, Ph.D. 1987–1990 – Milagros Muñoz, Ph.D. 1990 – Rev. Fr. Virgilio Abad Ojoy, O.P., S.Th.D., Ph.D. 1990–2000 – Ophelia Alcantara-Dimalanta, Ph.D.	2000–2003 – Armando F. de Jesus, Ph.D. 2003–2006 – Belen Lorezca-Tangco, O.P., Ph.D. 2006–2009 – Armando F. de Jesus, Ph.D. 2009–2019 – Michael Anthony C. Vasco, Ph.D.	2019–2022 – Marilu Rañosa-Madrunio, Ph.D. 2022–2023 – Jacqueline Lopez-Kaw, D.C.L. 2023–present – Melanie D. Turingan-Marcos, Ph.D.

== Academics ==
The UST Faculty of Arts and Letters offers thirteen undergraduate degrees, having been recognized by the Commission on Higher Education (CHED) as a Center of Excellence in Philosophy and as a Center of Development in Communication, Journalism, and Literature.

As of 2026, twelve undergraduate programs have been assessed by the Philippine Association of Colleges and Universities Commission on Accreditation (PACUCOA): Economics, Legal Management, Literature, and Philosophy are reaccredited at PACUCOA Level IV (valid through September 2030). Asian Studies, Behavioral Science, Communication, Journalism, Political Science, and Sociology hold PACUCOA Level III reaccreditation (valid through March 2026), while History and English Language Studies have Level II accreditation (valid through September 2030). The Communication and Journalism programs were accredited with the ASEAN University Network-Quality Assurance (AUN‑QA) certification in November 2022.

All undergraduate degrees offered by the faculty are Bachelor of Arts (AB/BA).

=== Programs/Degrees ===
- Asian Studies – Interdisciplinary studies in Asian history, philosophy, literature, religion, geography, politics, culture, and foreign service.
- Behavioral Science – Combines psychology, anthropology, cognitive science, and human resource management.
- Communication – Covers media studies, linguistics, advertising, and production in film, television, and digital platforms.
- Creative Writing – Specializes in fiction, poetry, playwriting, screenwriting, and creative nonfiction.
- Economics – Focuses on economic theory, research methods, and applications.
- English Language Studies – Covers syntax, pragmatics, grammar, applied linguistics, and World Englishes.
- History – Offers courses in Philippine, Asian, European, and world history, with emphasis on historiography.
- Journalism – Training in news, feature, and investigative writing, broadcast journalism, and layout.
- Legal Management – Integrates legal studies with business, public policy, and management preparation.
- Literature – Focuses on literary theory, genre studies, translation, and stylistics.
- Philosophy – Studies classical and contemporary philosophy, ethics, and Thomistic thought.
- Political Science – Offers coursework in governance, international relations, public administration, and diplomacy.
- Sociology – Focuses on social theory, research, policy, and community immersion programs.

The most populated programs in 2026 were Communication, Legal Management, Political Science, Behavioral Science, and Journalism.

== Facilities ==
=== St. Raymund de Peñafort Building ===
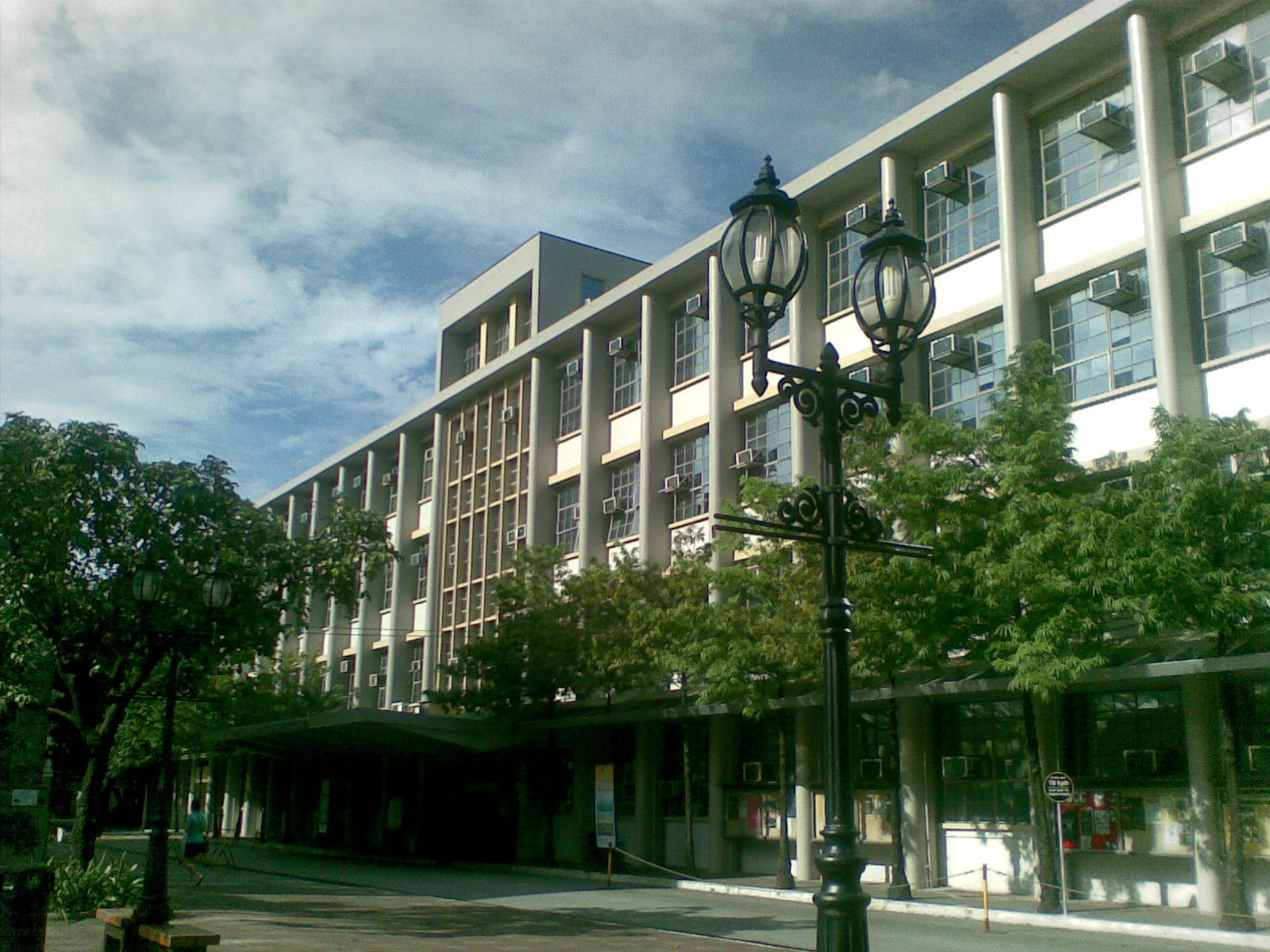
St. Raymund de Peñafort Building, which houses both the Faculty of Arts and Letters and the College of Commerce and Business Administration.

The faculty is located in the first and second levels of St. Raymund de Peñafort Building in the northeastern part of the UST campus, near Dapitan Street. The college shares the building with the College of Commerce and Business Administration, which occupies the third and fourth levels.

It has several audio-visual conference rooms, a fully wired computer laboratory, a student activity center, a faculty hall, fully air-conditioned classrooms, free Wi-Fi access, photocopying machines, and formerly a medium-sized auditorium (Jose Rizal Conference Hall) which was transformed into three expandable multimedia rooms.

=== Buenaventura Garcia Paredes, O.P. Building ===
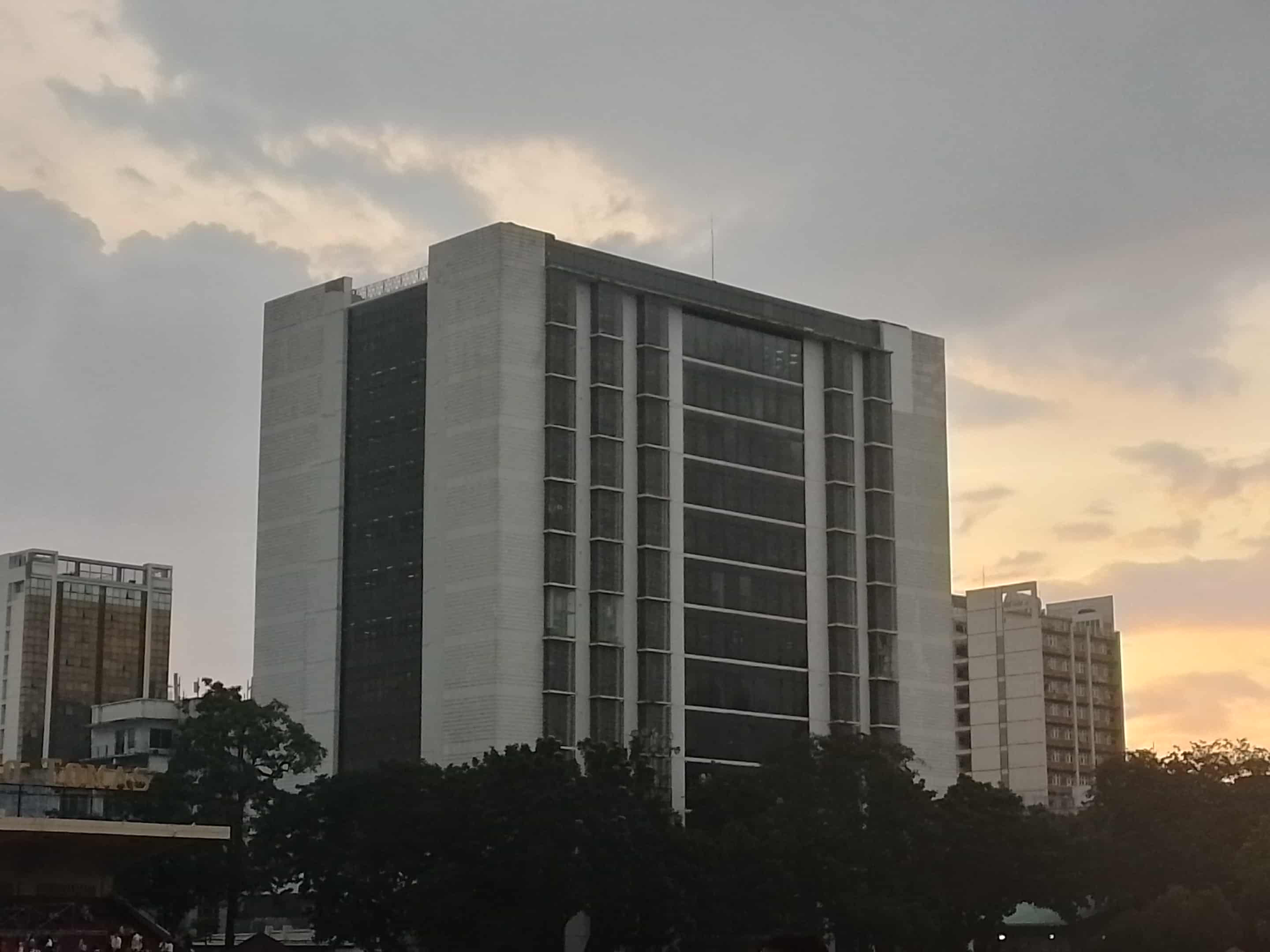
Buenaventura Garcia Paredes, O.P. Building, which houses both the Faculty of Arts and Letters and the College of Tourism and Hospitality Management.

Two of its programs, Communication and Journalism, utilize the 11th and 12th floors of the Buenaventura Garcia Paredes, O.P. Building which is also home to the university's Communications Bureau.

=== Miguel de Benavides Library ===
UST Miguel de Benavides Library

Among its many departments, the Miguel de Benavides Library has nine departments which suit the academic requirements of the college:

- Humanities Section – books on world literature and philosophy.
- Languages Section – books on languages, linguistics, and speech communication.
- Filipiniana Section – books on economics, history, arts, culture, literature, etc. that was published in the Philippines.
- Civil Law Section – books on laws and jurisprudence.
- Social Sciences Section – books on history, education, economics, political science, psychology etc.
- Asian Studies Section – books on Asian history, geography, politics, society, etc.
- Religion Section – books on religion and philosophy.
- Periodicals Section – hard copies of major newspapers and magazines from the pre-war period up to the present.
- General References Section – encyclopedias, dictionaries, atlases, almanacs, etc.
- Educational Technology Center (EdTech Center) – supervises the Tomcat, a student-run cable television network. The center has mini-theatres, audio-visual rooms, and an archive of important films, television documentaries, and audio-CDs.

The library also has conference rooms readily available and free-of-charge to students and faculty upon prior reservation.

== Research centers ==
Arts and Letters faculty members are affiliated with the following research institutes:

- UST Center for Creative Writing and Literary Studies – a special academic unit run by literature professors and active writers (poets, essayists, and novelists) in the country and abroad. The center conducts literary workshops for a select group of literary enthusiasts, dubbed as Fellows. The Thomasian Writers Guild (TWG) is an independent association of UST students, faculty and alumni who are actively engaged in the literary field. Members frequently run or at least participate in the projects of the center.
- UST Research Center for Social Sciences and Education – the social science research arm of the university, which conducts meaningful and responsive research in the fields of social sciences and education.
- UST Research Center for Culture, Arts, and the Humanities – an institution dedicated to advancing Filipino heritage studies and producing new knowledge in various humanistic fields.
- UST Research Center for Theology, Religious Studies, and Ethics (RCTRSE) – a center that promotes research and scholarly engagement on theological, religious, ethical, and moral issues.

== The Flame ==
The Flame
- Type: Student publication
- Format: Broadsheet and Magazine
- Owner(s): University of Santo Tomas Faculty of Arts and Letters
- Editor-in-chief: Veancy Palad
- Associate editor: Yelah Israel
- Managing editor: Jessica Luna
- Adviser: Alexis B. Romero, MA
- Founded: October 16, 1964
- Language: English, Filipino
- Headquarters: St. Raymund de Peñafort Building, Quezon Drive, UST, Sampaloc, Manila
- Website: www.abtheflame.net

The Flame is the official student publication of the University of Santo Tomas Faculty of Arts and Letters. Established on October 16, 1964, it was formed through the merger of Blue Quill and the Journal of Arts and Science, in order to serve the interests of the newly unified student body Faculty of Arts and Letters student body, known as Artlets. Rey Datu, who had previously served as vice president of the Faculty of Arts and Letters Student Council, became its first editor‑in‑chief.

=== History ===
Originally focused on the Arts and Letters community and university affairs, The Flame later expanded its scope during the turbulent political climate of the 1970s. Amid Martial Law—marked by Proclamation No. 1081—the publication transitioned into the Journal of the Humanities to include essays and articles addressing national issues.

During Martial Law, the student newspaper faced challenges such as censorship and financial constraints. In September 1972, the editorial board published an all-Tagalog issue titled Lagablab. Fearing that authorities might interpret its contents as inciting rebellion, thousands of copies were destroyed before distribution, although editorial board member Bong Osorio managed to circulate some copies.

On May 11, 1992, The Flame released a lampoon issue titled The Phlegm, which offered humorous critiques of the general elections. The publication also continues to feature its literary folio, Dapitan (named after Dapitan Street).

=== Literary contributions and alumni ===
Over the years, The Flame has featured contributions from many esteemed writers. Among those who have contributed to its literary folio (Dapitan) are Palanca Award–winning authors and poets such as Rebecca Añonuevo, Joel Toledo, Edgar Calabia Samar, Eros Atalia, and Merlinda Bobis, as well as Benedict “Ned” Parfan, Angelo Suárez, Nerisa del Carmen Guevarra, Jose Victor Torres, and Lourd Ernest de Veyra. The late Artlets dean Ophelia Dimalanta—who also served as a publication adviser—was among its contributors. The publication's alumni include not only celebrated writers but also prominent professionals in law (e.g. Avelino Sebastian, Jr. and 2024 bar topnotcher Ephraime Bie) and media (such as journalist Sandra Aguinaldo, authors Angelo Suárez and J. Pocholo Goitia, and associate editor Parfan). Torres, for instance, served as The Flame’s publication adviser in 2008, while alumni Glenda Gloria (co-founder and executive editor of Rappler) and Aaron Favila (a photographer for the Associated Press) have also contributed to its legacy. Palanca Award–winning author and journalist Joselito Zulueta—currently the publication adviser of The Varsitarian—is another alumnus.

=== Reporting and recognition ===
In recent years, The Flame has garnered recognition in mainstream Philippine media for its investigative and human‑interest stories. Its reporting on the financial burdens imposed on UST faculty and staff by the Manila City Ordinance No. 8793 (a health permit requirement) was later cited or reported by The Philippine Star. In 2024, The Flame also published the feature story of Roberto Solis—a 63‑year‑old journalism student—chronicling his journey to complete his degree.

On February 23, 2024, The Flame published an editorial on a case of alleged censorship involving a student organization. The editorial sarcastically thanked the Office for Student Affairs (OSA) for the ensuing bad press, a move that led to significant campus debate over issues of press freedom. TomasinoWeb, a UST‑based media outlet who was the student organization mentioned, eventually resumed operations on March 8, 2024, following the appointment of an interim adviser.

On May 21, 2025, the article published by The Flame titled "From streets to sheets: Motorcycle drivers ride on sex work as they traverse hard times" authored by its editor-in-chief Zoe Airabelle Aguinaldo, associate editor Joss Gabriel Oliveros, Jianzen Deananeas, and Ma. Alyanna Selda won the first place in-depth reporting category at the 2024 Society of Professional Journalists (SPJ) Mark of Excellence Awards for Region 11, making it the first campus publication based in Asia to receive the award in this category. Earlier, in January 2025, the same article was also awarded Best In-Depth Report at the 10th UST National Campus Journalism Awards, hosted by The Varsitarian.

In April 2026, The Flame received four awards at the 2025 SPJ Region 2 Mark of Excellence Awards, marking its second consecutive year of receiving honors from the international journalism competition. The publication won first place in the campus reporting category for its coverage of the labor dispute between the University administration and the UST Faculty Union. The winning articles were "CHED sets 15-day deadline for UST to explain alleged violation of tuition hike share allocation" by issues editor Veancy Palad and John Martin Revilla, “UST says it provided benefits beyond what is required by the law as a ‘gesture of goodwill’” by Selda, and “UST faculty members to get P220 million tuition hike shares, 100% medical coverage” by news editor Mei Lin Weng.

== Faculty of Arts and Letters Student Council ==
The Faculty of Arts and Letters Student Council (formally known as the Artlets Student Council, and referred to as ABSC for brevity) is the primary student governing body of all students of the Faculty of Arts and Letters. It is currently divided into two bodies: the executive board, and the Board of Majors. The executive board is composed of the seven faculty-wide elective officers (president, vice president for external affairs, vice president for internal affairs, secretary, treasurer, auditor, and public relations officer), and the Board of Majors, colloquially referred to as "BOM", which exercises quasi-legislative and quasi-judicial powers, and is composed of the highest executive officer of each existing academic society in the faculty. The ABSC Constitution provides for a need to have a Speaker in the Board of Majors. Current initiatives of the Board of Majors include the de facto Deputy Speaker and Secretary.

The contemporary ABSC can trace its roots from the Pax Romana (UST's religious organization) which exercised the functions of a student forum in the university during the Martial Law period in the Philippines under the dictatorship of President Ferdinand E. Marcos. A student council was already in operation when the Marcos administration discouraged the formation of student councils. The former AB Student Council ceased operations, though some academic societies were founded in the 1970s that are still existing today. However, no academic society in the faculty held the specific term "Student Council" and there was no unifying student council for the students of the faculty.

Malacañang heard of the students' initiative to create a faculty-wide student council and summoned its founder into the Palace, Reynaldo Lopez, then president of the Pax Romana, to defend the rationale behind the creation of the student council in front of President Marcos himself. Through the efforts of its student leaders, the ABSC was founded as the first student council of its kind in the country in 1980. Lopez became the first vice president, and Ronald Llamas, a future member of President Benigno "Noynoy" Aquino's cabinet, served as the first president of the newly-established student council.

The ABSC president, along with other presidents of college and faculty student councils, make up the legislative branch of the university-wide Central Student Council (which was also reinstituted by Lopez, patterned after the organizational structure of the Pax Romana). They are known as the UST CSC Central Board and are the counterpart to the executory branch of the Central Student Council, the UST CSC Executive Board, who are elected via university-wide voting. Student council elections are held during the last few weeks of the school year. However, it was not until 1991, under the presidency of Lito Villanueva, that this practice came into surface. Villanueva was the first ABSC president to serve for two academic years (1990–1992), a feat followed during the UST Quadricentennial Celebration by Julius Fernandez (2011–2013) who initiated the Quasquicentennial celebration of the faculty. Aside from contributing to university-wide changes, the ABSC is known to lead the portion of Thomasian students who are serving as the frontliners in rallies and causes, events of national essence, and sociopolitical gatherings inside or outside the university.

== Student life ==
=== Student organizations ===
==== Program-based organizations ====
As with other programs in the university, each program of the faculty is supported by a recognized student society. Some societies have gained accreditation from organizations outside of the university. The UST Asian Studies Society gained accreditation from the Philippine National Commission for United Nations Educational, Scientific, and Cultural Organization (UNESCO) in 2016. The UST Communication Arts Students' Association is a founding member of the Metro Manila Alliance of Communication Students and a partner of the Philippine Association of Communication Educators (PACE). The UST History Society is a member of the Local Historical Committees Network of the National Historical Commission of the Philippines (NHCP). The UST Journalism Society is a founding member of the Talamitam Network of Schools, who promote community journalism in the country. The UST Legal Management Society is a founding member of the Philippine Alliance of Legal Management Society and the Alliance of Legal Management Associations of the Philippines, Inc. (ALMAP, Inc.). The UST Political Science Forum is affiliated with the Association of Political Science Organizations of the Philippines (APSOP), and its faculty members are part of the Philippine Political Science Association (PPSA). Established as the Political Science Society in 1980, it was renamed TPSF in 1991.

- UST Asian Studies Society (ASSOC)
- UST Behavioral Science Society (BESSOC)
- UST Communication Arts Students’ Association (CASA)
- UST MaKatha Circle (MKC)
- UST Artlets Economics Society (AES)
- UST English Language Studies Society (ELSSOC)
- UST History Society (HSTSOC)
- UST Journalism Society (JRNSOC)
- UST Legal Management Society (LMSOC)
- UST Literary Society (LITSOC)
- UST Concilium Philosophiae
- The Political Science Forum (TPSF)
- UST Sociological Society (USTSS)

==== College-based organizations ====
Artistang Artlets (AA) is the official theater organization of the Faculty of Arts and Letters, founded in 1980 by Marie Luz Datu and Nick Galvez of the Philippine Educational Theater Association. The UST Chorus of Arts and Letters (AB Chorale/ABC) is the official student choral group of the college, officially founded in 1995 by Ophelia Dimalanta. BA Dauncen is the official dance troupe of the faculty and is the successor of the defunct Dance Synergy.

The AB Debate Parliament (ABDP) is the official debate organization of the faculty. The AB team won the Dialectics Debate Competition, sponsored by the university-wide Thomasian Debaters Council, in 2008. The Pax Romana – Arts & Letters Unit is the faculty's unit of the Central Pax Romana, the university's official religious organization. RCYC AB (Red Cross Youth Council – AB Unit) is the faculty’s unit of the Philippine Red Cross Youth Council.

The Artlets Basketball Team and the Artlets Volleyball Team are the official student basketball and volleyball teams of the college, respectively, and compete with other colleges in thenames. The AB Pautakan Team is the official student quiz bee team of the college, having reigned as Pautakan champions in 1979, 1989, from 2002 to 2006, and in 2009.

Former student organizations in the faculty include the AB International Youth Council (AB IYC), the AB Knighted Owls (AVA; the official drum line organization of the faculty), and the AB Football Club (ABFC; the official student football team of the college)

- Artistang Artlets (AA)
- UST Chorus of Arts and Letters (AB Chorale/ABC)
- BA Dauncen
- AB Debate Parliament (ABDP)
- Artlets Basketball Team
- Artlets Volleyball Team
- AB Pautakan Team
- Pax Romana – Arts & Letters Unit
- Red Cross Youth Council – AB Unit (RCYC AB)

Student political parties

The Students' Democratic Party (SDP) is the oldest student political party in the Philippines. It was established on June 12, 1981, during the Ferdinand Marcos regime. SDP is one of the founding parties of the Lakas Tomasino Coalition (LTC), a university-wide political party, and remains its affiliate.

The Democratic Knights for Academic Advancement (DEKADA) is the second oldest political party in the Faculty of Arts and Letters. Originally called Dekada Nobenta, it was founded on December 2, 1992, and is affiliated with the AKLAS (Alyansa ng Kristiyanong Lakas) Central Political Party.

The Grand Alliance for Progress (GAP) was the first political party in the faculty established after the year 2000. In its early years, GAP actively joined the EDSA II that led to the ouster of President Joseph Estrada. It was also a founding member of the Lakas Tomasino Coalition (LTC) but pulled out of the coalition in 2006.

The Student Alliance for the Advancement of Democratic Rights in UST (STAND-UST) was established in 2015. Tindig UST - AB was founded in 2024 as a chapter of the TINDIG party formed in UST Senior High School (TINDIG UST-SHS). The newest party is the Lakas ng Alyansang Yaman ay Aksyon (LAYA-AB), which debuted in 2026, having first existed as a party in the elections of TPSF (LAYA-TPSF).

- Students' Democratic Party (SDP)
- Democratic Knights for Academic Advancement (DEKADA)
- Grand Alliance for Progress (GAP)
- Student Alliance for the Advancement of Democratic Rights in UST (STAND-UST)
- Tindig UST - AB
- Lakas ng Alyansang Yaman ay Aksyon (LAYA-AB)

==== Student regulatory bodies ====
The Faculty of Arts and Letters - Commission on Elections (AB COMELEC) is the official student elections authority of the college.

== Prominent alumni ==
Some of the college's notable alumni (graduates and former students), in alphabetical order:

=== Academe ===
- Richard Ang – Filipino divinity scholar; 97th rector magnificus of the University of Santo Tomas
- Alfredo Co – Filipino philosopher; full professor of philosophy, University of Santo Tomas; president, Philippine Academy of Philosophical Research
- Ophelia Alcantara Dimalanta – S.E.A. Write Awardee; former executive director, UST Center for Creative Writing and Studies; former dean, UST Faculty of Arts and Letters; textbook author; literary critic
- Cristina Pantoja-Hidalgo – former vice president for public affairs, University of the Philippines System; former director, UP Institute of Creative Writing, current director UST Center for Creative Writing and Literary Studies (CCWLS)
- Bienvenido Lumbera – professor, School of Humanities, Ateneo de Manila University, professor emeritus, UP College of Arts and Letters; professor of literature and creative writing, De La Salle University-Manila College of Liberal Arts; co-founder, Bienvenido N. Santos Creative Writing and Research Center, DLSU-Manila
- Ponciano Pineda – former chairman, National Commission on the Filipino Language; editor-in-chief, Diksyunaryo ng Wikang Filipino
- Alejandro Roces – president, CAP College Foundation; former Secretary of Education; columnist, The Philippine Star
- Liza Lopez-Rosario – inaugural dean of the University of Santo Tomas Graduate School of Law
- Tranquil Salvador III – Bar examiner, remedial law (2018 Bar Examinations); author, criminal procedure; dean, Manila Adventist College-School of Law and Jurisprudence; Former dean, Pamantasan ng Lungsod ng Pasay, College of Law; professor of law, University of the Philippines and Ateneo de Manila University, School of Law
- Michael Anthony Vasco – Filipino Thomist philosopher; former dean, UST Faculty of Arts and Letters; dean, UST Graduate School
- Magdalena Villaba – former dean, UST Faculty of Arts and Letters; Pro Ecclesia et Pontifice awardee, dean emerita, UST Graduate School

=== Business ===
- Henry Tenedero – GoNegosyo mentor; professor; entrepreneur; motivational speaker
- Jeffrey Tarayao – president, One Meralco Foundation, Chief Corporate Social Responsibility Officer of Meralco; Grand Anvil Awardee

=== Media ===
- Bong Osorio - Vice President for Corporate Communications, ABS-CBN
- Crispin Maslog – communication educator
- Sandra Aguinaldo – investigative reporter and field correspondent, GMA Network; 2008 Silver Screen Awardee, US International Film & Video Festival; 2008 Silver Medalist, New York Festivals
- Arnold Clavio – newscaster and public affairs host, GMA Network; 2008 Silver Screen Awardee, US International Film & Video Festival; 2008 Bronze Medalist and UNDP Special Awardee, New York Festivals
- Ali Sotto – newscaster and public affairs host, ABC-5; radio program host, DZBB; television and film actress
- Gil Portes – film director
- Bernardo Bernardo – stage, TV and film actor; Best Actor Urian Awards (Ishmael Bernal's Manila by Night); singer, writer, director, comedian; Tagalog lecturer, University of California Riverside
- Winnie Cordero (Rowena Cordero) – main cast at Sine'skwela, Batibot, Magandang Umaga Pilipinas and Umagang Kay Ganda; television and film actress; television host at ABS-CBN; 2005 & 2006 Golden Dove Awardee for Best Variety Radio Program Host
- Faye Martel – television producer, actress, and professor; executive producer of Artista Academy; founding chairperson of the Tiger Media Network
- Lourd Ernest de Veyra – songwriter and lead vocalist of rock band Radioactive Sago Project
- Johnny Delgado – film, television and stage actor; drama instructor, Asia Pacific Film Institute
- Jun Lana – playwright, screenwriter and director
- Wado Siman – celebrity chef
- Frank Lloyd Mamaril - entertainment director
- Gretchen Malalad – field reporter, ABS-CBN; former housemate, Pinoy Big Brother: Celebrity Edition; Southeast Asian Games gold medalist for Karate
- Glenda Gloria – co-founder and executive of Rappler, served as a news writer for The Flame.
- Piolo Pascual – actor, singer, and commercial model, honorary member, Teatro Tomasino
- Eula Valdez – television and film actress; commercial model
- Jennifer Sevilla – movie and television actress; member of That's Entertainment
- John Manalo – movie and television actor; FAMAS and Star Awards Best Child Actor
- Kristel Fulgar – television and film actress; host; social media influencer

=== Government and diplomatic affairs ===
- Alice Bulos - former commissioner of the United States Federal Council on the Aging, appointed by Bill Clinton
- Guiller Asido – chief administrator of the Intramuros Administration; former Corporate Secretary and Legal Counsel, Philippine Tourism Authority
- Alfredo Benipayo – former court administrator of the Philippine Supreme Court; Commission on Elections Chairman; Solicitor General; and former dean of the UST Faculty of Civil Law
- Harriet Demetriou – former Commission on Elections Chairperson, Sandiganbayan Associate Justice
- Joey Lina – former governor of Laguna; former senator of the Philippines; former secretary of interior and local government
- Susan Ople – first secretary of the Department of Migrant Workers
- Andres Narvasa – former Supreme Court chief justice; chairman of the Preparatory Commission for Constitutional Reform
- Francisco Tatad – former Philippine senator and minister of public information
- Ramon Paul Hernando – Associate Justice of the Supreme Court of the Philippines
- Florin Hilbay – former Solicitor General of the Philippines
- Rosalinda Asuncion Vicente – Associate Justice, Philippine Court of Appeals
- Victor Ziga – former Philippine senator
- Ronald Llamas – political analyst, activist; first president of the Arts and Letters Student Council; presidential adviser for political affairs under the presidency of Noynoy Aquino.

=== History and historical figures ===
- Gregorio F. Zaide – history professor; author, History of Asian Nations; former president, Philippine Historical Association

=== Literature ===
- Alejandro Abadilla – Carlos Palanca Awardee for Literature; Founder, Kapisanang Balagtas
- Roberto T. Añonuevo – Hall of Fame, Don Carlos Palanca Memorial Awards for Literature
- Teo Antonio – renowned poet
- Cirilo F. Bautista – literary contributor, Panorama Lifestyle Magazine; renowned poet, fictionist, critic and writer of nonfiction
- Jose Wendell Capili – Carlos Palanca Awardee for Literature
- Lourd Ernest de Veyra – poet, songwriter
- Eric Gamalinda – poet
- J. Neil Garcia – poet and literary critic; director, UP Press
- Avelina Gil – writer
- Amado V. Hernandez – poet, journalist, novelist, playwright
- Cristina Pantoja-Hidalgo – professor; former executive director, UP Institute for Creative Writing; Carlos Palanca Awardee for Literature; former dean, UP College of Arts and Letters; former director, UP Press; former director, UST Center for Creative Writing and Literary Studies
- Nick Joaquin – National Artist for Literature
- F. Sionil Jose – National Artist for Literature; Ramon Magsaysay Awardee
- Bienvenido Lumbera – National Artist for Literature; Ramon Magsaysay Awardee
- Jose Villa Panganiban – Commissioner on Filipino language; editor-in-chief, Diksyunaryo-Tesauro Pilipino-Ingles
- Ponciano Pineda – Carlos Palanca Awardee for Literature; chairman, National Commission on the Filipino Language; editor-in-chief, Diksyunaryo ng Wikang Filipino
- Rogelio R. Sikat – Carlos Palanca Awardee for Literature; fictionist, playwright, translator and educator.
- Rolando Tinio – poet, director, actor, critic, essayist and educator

=== Publishing ===
- Eugenia Duran Apostol – founder, Philippine Daily Inquirer; first recipient, UP Gawad Plaridel (highest individual media award); Ramon Magsaysay Awardee
- Teodoro Benigno (Teddy Benigno) – journalist; chief speechwriter of President Corazon Aquino
- Cirilo F. Bautista – literary contributor, Panorama Lifestyle Magazine
- Rina Jimenez-David – columnist, The Philippine Daily Inquirer and Sunday Inquirer Magazine
- Lourd Ernest de Veyra – journalist; lead vocalist of rock band Radioactive Sago Project

=== Society, fashion, and culture ===
- Rosemarie Arenas (Baby Arenas) – philanthropist, socialite, concert producer
- Evangeline Pascual – Miss Republic of the Philippines 1973; Miss World 1973 1st Runner-up; television and film actress
- Joanne Quintas-Primero – Binibining Pilipinas-Universe 1995; Miss Universe 1995 11th placer (preliminary round); Miss Tourism International 1997; television and film actress
- Daisy Reyes – Binibining Pilipinas-World 1996; Miss Personality of the World 1996; Miss Expo International 1997 4th Runner-up; entrepreneur

=== Socio-civic affairs and public advocacy ===
- Eugenia Duran Apostol – founder, Foundation for Worldwide People Power; one of 65 Great Asian Heroes, Time Magazine (Nov. 2006)
- Lourd Ernest de Veyra – member, Artists for the Removal of Gloria (ARREST Gloria); lead vocalist, Radioactive Sago Project

== See also ==
- University of Santo Tomas
