= Evelyn Songco =

Filipino historian and administrator (born 1952)

- Born: Evelyn Ariola; 18 August 1952 (age 74); Banate, Iloilo, Philippines
- Education: University of Santo Tomas (BA Magna cum laude); University of Santo Tomas (MA); University of Santo Tomas (PhD)
- Occupation: Professor
- Writing career
- Notable work: Teaching Strategies in the Social Sciences for Elementary Grades

Evelyn Ariola-Songco (née Ariola; born August 18, 1952) is a Filipino historian, professor, and educational administrator. She has been among the longest-serving deans of students in the Philippines as she held a rector's cabinet position in the University of Santo Tomas for more than two decades. She was a former president of Philippine Historical Association and the Philippine Association of Administrators of Student Affairs. She is the current president of the UST Alumni Association, Inc.

== Education ==
She finished her secondary education at Concordia College in 1969 and obtained her Bachelor of Science in Education Magna cum laude from the University of Santo Tomas College of Education in 1973. She has a Master of Arts (1995) and Doctor of Philosophy (2000) degrees in Development Education from the University of Santo Tomas Graduate School.

== Professional life ==
Ariola-Songco started her career as a teacher at the University of Santo Tomas Junior High School and subsequently became a Supervising Teacher for History at the University of Santo Tomas College of Education. Ariola-Songco was a faculty member at the University of Santo Tomas College of Education where she previously served as secretary of the College and was promoted to assistant rector for student affairs in 1990.

Ariola-Songco was instrumental in the founding of the university's community development arm during the 1990s, which was rebranded in 2011 as the UST Simbahayan Office, with the coined word simbahayan being an amalgamation of three Filipino words simbahan (church), bahay (home), bayan (country). The rebranding coincided with the 400th anniversary of the university. The community development arm has partnered with several industry leaders in many projects.

Upon the discovery of UST student Mark Chua's death, several groups in the Philippines have put the Reserve Officers' Training Corps system under fire and Ariola-Songco's doctoral dissertation became instrumental in the implementation of the National Service Training Program in the Philippines.

Ariola-Songco was instrumental in the building of the UST Tan Yan Kee Student Center, a four-storey modern edifice within the España campus, which serves as the hub of student organizations.

Ariola-Songco headed the volunteers during the Papal visit at the University of Santo Tomas in 2015 and served as Deputy Incident Commander during the Metro Manila Shake Drill.

== Select bibliography ==
- Cultural Education in the Philippines: An Impact Assessment (2018)
- Uncovering Initiatives Around the World That Foster Holistic Student Development (2010)
- Teaching Strategies in the Social Sciences for Elementary Grades (2002)
- Distance Education Model (2000)

== See also ==
- Richard Ang
- Nilo Divina
- Liza Lopez-Rosario
- Marilu Madrunio
