= List of University of Santo Tomas publications =

This list includes all the newspapers and academic journals published by the University of Santo Tomas.

== Academic and research journals ==
Publication	ISSN	Notes	Foundation	Reference
Acta Manilana	0567-7688	a journal for the natural and applied sciences	1965	
The Antoninus Journal (formerly Ad Veritatem)	2423-3048, 1655-4434	the multi-disciplinary research journal of the UST Graduate School		
The Asian Journal of English Language Studies	2350-773X	the journal of the UST Department of English		
Boletin Ecclesiastico	1908-5567	the Interdiocesian journal of UST	1923	
De Las Casas	2449-3759	the UST Community Development journal		
Hasaan: Journal ng Wikang Filipino		the journal of the UST Department of Filipino		
Kritike	1908-7330	the journal of the UST Department of Philosophy	2007	
Philippine Journal of Allied Health Sciences	1908-5044	the research journal of the UST Center for Research on Movement Science	2006	
Philippiniana Sacra	0115-9577	the publication of the Ecclesiastical Faculties	1966	
Santo Tomas Journal of Medicine	0371-3520	the publication of the Faculty of Medicine and Surgery		
Tomas	0119-7908	the literary journal of the UST Center for Creative Writing and Studies	1999	
Unitas	0041-7149	a quarterly journal for the arts and sciences	1922	
UST Law Review	0047-5734	the journal of the Faculty of Civil Law	1950	

== Newsletters ==
Publication	ISSN	Notes	Foundation	Reference
The Academia	0117-0082	International bulletin of the university		
Thomasian Sunscope		alumni newsletter of the university		

== University-wide ==
Publication	Notes	Foundation	Reference
The Varsitarian	Student publication of the university	1928	
Montage	Literary folio of The Varsitarian		
Breaktime	Summer magazine of The Varsitarian		

== College-based ==
Publication	ISSN	Notes	Foundation	Reference
The Accountancy Journal		The official student publication of UST- AMV College of Accountancy	2006	
The Commerce Journal	0566-8727	College of Commerce and Business Administration		
Dapitan		University of Santo Tomas Faculty of Arts and Letters, literary folio of The Flame		
Docere		College of Education, student newspaper of the UST Education Journal		
The Education Journal	0015-3021	The official student publication of the College of Education. In 2012, it became a pure student research journal of the UST Education Journal Office.	1956	
The Flame		The official student publication of the University of Santo Tomas Faculty of Arts and Letters.	1964	
Kahel		College of Education, the literary, art, photography folio of the UST Education Journal		
Momentum		College of Science		
The Nursing Journal	0048-9123	College of Nursing	1946	
Nursing Newsletter		College of Nursing		
Purple Gazette		Faculty of Pharmacy	1967	
Science Journal	0580-891X	College of Science		
Therapeutic Currents		College of Rehabilitation Sciences		
Transcend Daily		The official student publication of UST College of Tourism and Hospitality Management.	2024	
Thomasian Engineer		Faculty of Engineering		
The Thomasian Philosopher	0118-296X	Faculty of Philosophy		
The UST Medical Gazette		Faculty of Medicine and Surgery, supplement of the Santo Tomas Journal of Medicine		
Vision	0042-692X	College of Architecture		
Voyage		College of Tourism and Hospitality Management		
La Stampa		Formerly known as The Compendium, it is the official student publication of UST Senior High School.		
The Aquinian		UST Junior High School		
The Rosarian		Education High School		
