= Magdalena Villaba =

Filipino educational administrator and philosopher (1928–2023)

Magdalena Alonso Villaba, Ph.D.

Dean Emerita of the University of Santo Tomas Graduate School

Personal details
- Born: Magdalena Vicente Alonso; July 22, 1928 Philippine Islands
- Died: September 11, 2023 (aged 95)
- Spouse: Mamerto Villaba
- Children: 2
- Parent(s): Jose Mario Gonzales Alonso Sr. (Father); Victoria Lagasca Vicente (Mother)
- Education: University of Santo Tomas
- Occupation: Educational administrator; philosopher
- Awards: Pro Ecclesia et Pontifice

Magdalena Vicente Alonso Villaba (July 22, 1928 – September 11, 2023) was a Filipino educational administrator and philosopher. One of the country's most respected philosophy academics, Alonso Villaba published several books and articles on oriental philosophy and Christian philosophy. In 1987, she was awarded the Pro Ecclesia et Pontifice by Saint John Paul II, then the highest honor a Catholic lay woman could be conferred with.

== Early life and education ==
Magdalena Vicente Alonso was born on July 22, 1928 to Jose Mario Gonzales Alonso Sr. and Victoria Lagasca Vicente. Magdalena Alonso Villaba finished high school from St. Paul College Manila. She graduated from the University of Santo Tomas with a Bachelor of Philosophy degree in 1957, Master of Arts in philosophy in March 1968, and a Doctor of Philosophy degree in May 1976.

One year after graduating in 1957, she was recruited to teach Philosophy at the University of Santo Tomas by Filipino philosopher Dr. Emerita Quito (1929-2017).

== Career ==
Magdalena Alonso Villaba was assistant dean and dean of University of Santo Tomas Faculty of Arts and Letters from 1972 to 1976 and 1976 to 1987 respectively, and was dean of the University of Santo Tomas Graduate School from 1987 to 1995. She was full professor and dean emeritus at the time of her retirement in 1996 but remained teaching at the University of Santo Tomas Graduate School until 2008 at the age of 80. Her dissertation "An Interpretation on the Doctrine of Transmigration" was published in full by Philippiniana Sacra in 1976. Her master thesis "The Atman-Brahman Relationship in the Upanishads" was published in full by Unitas in 1972.

== Death ==
Villaba died on September 11, 2023, at the age of 95.

== Bibliography ==
- Philosophy of the East (1980, 1995)
- Prelude to the Wisdom of the East (1979)
- The Mission of Women: A Return to their Original Role (1976)
- An Interpretation of the Doctrine of Transmigration (1975)

== Honors ==
- Pro Ecclesia et Pontifice (1987)
