= Colleges of the University of Santo Tomas =

Interdependent academic constituents

The University of Santo Tomas in Manila, Philippines has 22 colleges and 3 basic education school departments. The colleges are interdependent academic constituents of the university that offer undergraduate and graduate programs. Historically, the colleges are named as Faculty, College, Institute, School, or Conservatory. There are 19 colleges that offer civil courses and 3 faculties that also offer ecclesiastical programs.

The Faculties of Ecclesiastical Studies, though governed by its particular statutes, is still an integral part of the university.

A dean heads a faculty, college, or school. He is assisted by a faculty council and an assistant dean. All academic units are also supervised by a Dominican regent. In a faculty, college or school where the dean is a member of the Order of Preachers, the dean also functions as the regent. A director heads an institute.

Founded in 2017, the Graduate School of Law is the newest unit in the University.

== Types of college ==
Colleges that were founded with the university in 1611 up until the beginning of the twentieth century use the title of Faculty. This is an accordance with statutes of the medieval University of Salamanca and the Royal and Pontifical University of Mexico which used "facultad" for their constituent colleges. Various faculties on grammar, humanities, arts, and sciences existed in the early years of the university. These faculties evolved to become the present colleges, like the College of Science and the College of Fine Arts and Design. The Faculty of Sacred Theology, Faculty of Philosophy, and the Faculty of Canon Law, which are housed in the Faculties of Ecclesiastical Studies, are considered to be the oldest faculties in the university. The Faculty of Civil Law, founded in 1734, is usually dubbed as the "oldest lay faculty", while the Faculty of Engineering, founded in 1907, is regarded as the "youngest faculty". The term faculty is only historical and does not signify dominance over the "newer" colleges. UST is the only university in the Philippines that uses faculty.

College is used by independent degree-granting units that were founded since the American period in the 1920s until the present time. The College of Education, founded in 1926, is often called to be the "oldest college".

A department under a certain academic unit, which is being developed to become an independent entity, is given the title Institute. An Institute may also be established in the university as an organically independent body, like the Institute of Physical Education and Athletics. In 1974, the Institute of Physical Therapy was founded and was supervised by the College of Science and the Faculty of Medicine and Surgery. The institute was granted a full autonomy in 1993 and became independent in 2000, renamed as the College of Rehabilitation Sciences. In 2006, the Institute of Tourism and Hospitality Management was founded from the College of Education. It became an independent college in 2008. The Institute of Information and Computing Sciences (IICS) was established in 2014 from the Faculty of Engineering. In 2021, the IICS was elevated to the status of a College. Though referred to as an "Institute", the Institute of Religion does not confer undergraduate or graduate programs. It is a department that supervises the theology classes in the lay colleges.

School was earlier used by the School of Civil Engineering, School of Architecture and Fine Arts, School of Commerce, School of Nursing, and the defunct Normal School. Only the Graduate School and Graduate School of Law uses the style today.

Conservatory is used by the University's music school, the Conservatory of Music. It offers complete bachelor's degrees in music.

== Academic units ==
=== Present colleges ===
Below is the list of the present academic units of the university with their corresponding logos and symbols. The coat of arms of the older faculties and colleges of the university were designed by Cenon M. Rivera, former director of the fine arts department of the university. Each college also has a patron saint that was chosen based on the field or profession of the college. The selection is administered by the council of regents of the university.

Founded	College Other names	Departments/Programs	Logo symbols	Patron saint	Colors	Ref.
1611	Sacred Theology; Spanish: Facultad de Teología	Sacred Theology	Holy Chalice	St. Thomas Aquinas		
1611	Philosophy; Spanish: Facultad de Filosofía	Philosophy (Classical)	Owl of Minerva, Catherine wheel	St. Catherine of Alexandria		
1733	Canon Law; Spanish: Facultad de Cánones	Canon Law; Doctor of Canon Law; Licentiate in Canon Law	Keys of Heaven	St. Raymond of Peñafort		
1734	Civil Law; Filipino: Pakultad ng Batas Sibil; Spanish: Facultad de Jurisprudencia, Facultad de Derecho, Facultad de Derecho Civil; Latin: Facultas Legis Civilis	Juris Doctor	Balance scale, sword	St. Raymond of Peñafort		
1871	Medicine and Surgery; Filipino: Pakultad ng Medisina at Siruhiya, Pakultad ng Panggagamot at Pagtitistis; Spanish: Facultad de Medicina y Cirugia; Latin: Facultas Medicinae et Chirurgiae	Basic Human Studies; Master of Clinical Audiology; Master of Pain Management	Rod of Asclepius	Sts. Cosmas and Damian		
1871	Pharmacy; Filipino: Pakultad ng Parmasya; Spanish: Facultad de Farmacia	Biochemistry; Medical Technology; Pharmacy (Pharmacy, Clinical Pharmacy, Doctor of Pharmacy)	Bowl of Hygieia	Sts. Cosmas and Damian, Immaculate Conception		
1896	Arts and Letters; Filipino: Pakultad ng Sining at Panitik; Spanish: Facultad de Filosofia y Letras (defunct)	Asian Studies; Behavioral Science; Creative Writing; Communication; Economics; English Language Studies; History; Journalism; Legal Management; Literature; Philosophy; Political Science; Sociology	Athena, owl, scroll, quill	St. Thomas More		
1907	Engineering; Filipino: Pakultad ng Inhinyeriya; Spanish: Facultad de Ingenieria	Chemical; Civil; Electrical; Electronics and Communications; Industrial; Mechanical	Pylon, tower, factory, microprocessor, gear wheel, Erlenmeyer flask, laptop	Blessed Jordan of Saxony		
1926	Education; Filipino: Kolehiyo ng Pagtuturo; Spanish: Colegio de Pedagogia	Early Childhood Education; Elementary Education; Secondary Education (English, Filipino, Mathematics, Religious and Values Education, Science, Social Studies); Special Needs Education; Food Technology; Library and Information Science; Nutrition and Dietetics	Torch	St. Joseph of Calasanz		
1926	Science; Filipino: Kolehiyo ng Agham; Spanish: Colegio de Artes Liberales (defunct)	Applied Physics major in Instrumentation; Biology (Environmental, Industrial, Medical); Chemistry; Data Science and Analytics; Mathematics major in Actuarial Science; Molecular Biology and Biotechnology; Microbiology; Psychology	Globe	St. Albertus Magnus		
1930	Architecture; Filipino: Kolehiyo ng Arkitektura; Spanish: Colegio de Arquitectura y Bellas Artes (defunct)	Architecture	Ionic capital	Thomas the Apostle		
1934	Commerce and Business Administration; Filipino: Kolehiyo ng Kalakal at Pamamahalang Pang-negosyo; Spanish: Colegio de Comercio y Administracion	Business Administration (Marketing Management, Financial Management, Human Resource Management, and Business Economics); Entrepreneurship	Winged wheel	Matthew the Evangelist		
1938	Graduate School; Filipino: Paaralang Gradwado	Accountancy, Business, and Management; Health; Humanities and Social Sciences; Music, Arts, and Design; Sacred Sciences; Science, Technology, Engineering, and Mathematics	Biretta, an open book	St. Antoninus of Florence		
1945	Music; Filipino: Konserbatoryo ng Musika; Spanish: Conservatorio	Music	Harp of David	St. Cecilia		
1946	Nursing; Filipino: Kolehiyo ng Impirmeriya; Spanish: Escuela de Enfermeras	Nursing	Maltese cross, Lamp of Nightingale	St. Elizabeth of Hungary		
1974	Rehabilitation Sciences; Filipino: Kolehiyo ng Agham Pampabagong-tatag	Occupational Therapy; Physical Therapy; Speech–Language Pathology; Sports Science	Symbol of Access	St. Martin de Porres		
2000	Fine Arts and Design; Filipino: Kolehiyo ng Sining at Dibuho	Advertising Arts; Industrial Design; Interior Design; Painting	Paint brush, pencil, technical and dip pens	Blessed Fra Angelico		
2000	Physical Education and Athletics; Filipino: Instituto ng Edukasyong Pang-pisikal at Pang-palakasan	Sports and Wellness Management	Bengal tiger	Pope John Paul II		
2005	Accountancy; Filipino: Alfredo M. Velayo Kolehiyo ng Akawntansi, Kolehiyo ng Pagtutuos	Accountancy; Accounting Information System; Management Accounting	Abacus	St. Joseph		
2009	Tourism and Hospitality Management; Filipino: Kolehiyo ng Turismo at Pangasiwaang Pang-hospitalidad	Hospitality Management; Hotel and Restaurant Management; Tourism Management; Travel Management	Globe, laurel, torch	St. Hyacinth		
2014	Information and Computing Sciences; Filipino: Kolehiyo ng Agham Pang-kaalaman at Pang-kompyuter	Computer Science; Information Systems; Information Technology	Binary numeral system, artificial intelligence, gear wheels, mathematical symbols	St. Vincent Ferrer		
2017	Graduate School of Law; Filipino: Paaralang Gradwado ng Batas	Master of Laws; Doctor of Civil Law	Balance scale, Sword, an open book	St. Ivo of Kermartin		

=== Defunct colleges ===
- Faculty of Liberal Arts - 1611
- Faculty of Morals, Sacred Scripture & Liturgy - 1825
- School of Drawing and Painting - 1865
- College of Notaries - 1875
- School of Matrons/Midwifery - founded in 1879. It is the first academic unit to that accepted women.
- School of Ministering Surgeons - 1880
- School of Pharmacy for the Practitioner - 1880
- Faculty of Sciences - 1896
- Facultad de Carreras Especiales
- College of Dentistry - 1904
- College of Liberal Arts - founded in 1926. The college was reorganised to become two separate colleges of the Faculty of Arts and Letters and College of Science in 1964.
- Normal School - founded in 1940, merged with the College of Education in 1971.
- Institute of Nutrition - founded in 1970. It formed as an independent body from the College of Education. It eventually closed in the 1980s.
- Institute of Technological Courses - 1972

=== Basic education schools ===
Founded	High school unit	Logo	Patron saint	Colors
1928	Junior High School	UST Main Building tower	Blessed Mannes of Guzman	
1950	Education High School and Senior High School	Bible and torch	St. Joseph of Calasanz	
2016	Senior High School	Arch of the Centuries	Blessed Pier Giorgio Frassati	

== Renamed and separated colleges ==
The Faculty of Medicine and Surgery and the Faculty of Pharmacy were both founded in 1871 as the Facultad de Medicina y Farmacia and separated in 1901 to become two different faculties.

In 1896, the Faculty of Philosophy and Letters was founded, while the College of Liberal Arts was founded in 1926. In 1964, the College of Liberal Arts was reorganized, with the A.B. programs merged with the Faculty of Philosophy and Letters, becoming the Faculty of Arts and Letters. The programs leading to Bachelor of Science degrees were reorganized to become the College of Science. The College of Science retained the college color and seal of the College of Liberal Arts.

The College of Commerce and Business Administration had several name changes. It was first called as the School of Commerce in 1933. Later on, it developed to become the College of Commerce in 1934, College of Commerce and Accountancy in 1988, and eventually to its present name in 2004.

The College of Fine Arts and Design and the Conservatory of Music were originally part of the College of Architecture and Fine Arts. The Conservatory of Music separated in 1946, while the remaining Departments of Fine Arts and Architecture separated in 2000 to become the College of Fine Arts and Design and the College of Architecture, respectively.

The Institute of Physical Therapy was renamed as the College of Rehabilitation Sciences in 2001.

The Alfredo M. Velayo College of Accountancy became an independent college from the College of Commerce and Accountancy in 2004. It was also the first and currently, the only college of the university to be named after an alumnus.

In 2006, the Institute of Tourism and Hospitality Management was founded from the College of Education. It became the College of Tourism and Hospitality Management in 2008.

The Institute of Information and Computing Sciences was established in 2014 from the Faculty of Engineering. Originally named as the Institute of Information and Computer Studies, it became the College of Information and Computing Sciences in 2021.

== Roll call ==
In university events, like the Thomasian Welcome Walk and the sending-off rights, the roll call of the university colleges is done according to their foundation year instead of the usual alphabetical order. Founded in 1611, the Faculty of Sacred Theology is called and introduced first. Being the youngest, founded in 2017, the Graduate School of Law is called last.

The Thomasian, the university website, USTET application forms, and most official publications follow the same way of presenting the colleges.
