= Bong Osorio =

Filipino media executive and professor (1953–2020)

- Born: Ramon R. Osorio; 5 November 1953
- Died: 30 April 2020 (aged 66); Makati, Philippines
- Education: Paco Catholic School; Pontifical and Royal University of Santo Tomas (BA); Ateneo de Manila University (MBA)
- Occupations: Media Executive, Professor, Columnist

Ramon "Bong" Osorio (November 5, 1953 – April 30, 2020) was a Filipino media executive and communication professor at the University of Santo Tomas Faculty of Arts and Letters. He served as head of ABS-CBN Integrated Corporate Communications, the media company's public relations department, from 2007 to 2013. Osorio was President of the Public Relations Society of the Philippines and Council Member of the National Council for Children’s Television.

== Early years and education ==
Osorio finished his basic education from Paco Catholic School and pursued a communication degree from University of Santo Tomas Faculty of Arts and Letters graduating in 1974. Osorio was a student leader, being a member of his faculty's newspaper The Flame and the university student publication The Varsitarian. Osorio is also the founding president of the Communication Arts Students' Association.

He attained his Master of Business Administration from Ateneo de Manila University and attended trainings at Johns Hopkins University and George Washington University.

== Career ==
Osorio taught at the University of Santo Tomas and was promoted as the inaugural chairperson of the university's Department of Communication. He held the position for 17 years. While teaching in university, he practiced public relations and marketing for several media firms such as J. Walter Thompson, Saatchi & Saatchi, and DYR Alcantara. He worked as head of ABS-CBN Integrated Corporate Communications (also known as ABS-CBN PR, ABS-CBN Public Relations, ABS-CBN Corporate Communications, and ABS-CBN Social Media Newsroom) from 2007 until he was replaced by Kane Errol Choa upon his retirement in 2013. He continued writing for dailies in the Philippines such as The Philippine Star and BusinessMirror. He is a recipient of the prestigious TOTAL (The Outstanding Thomasian Alumni) Award from the University of Santo Tomas.

== Health and death ==
Osorio was diagnosed with brain tumor in September 2019 and has undergone surgery in October 2019. He died on April 30, 2020. An online eulogy was produced by the University of Santo Tomas Communications Bureau and the program was hosted by Osorio's former student Jeffrey Espiritu.
