= Ronald Llamas =

Filipino political commentator

Presidential Adviser on Political Affairs
- In office January 20, 2011 – June 30, 2016
- President: Benigno Aquino III
- Preceded by: Gabriel Claudio
- Succeeded by: Francis Tolentino

Member of the Board of Directors of the Development Bank of the Philippines
- In office June 30, 2010 – January 20, 2011

President of Akbayan
- In office 1998–2010

Personal details
- Party: Akbayan
- Education: University of Santo Tomas (BA in Journalism, 1978–1982)
- Occupation: Political analyst, consultant
- Known for: Former Presidential Political Adviser; Former President of Akbayan

Rolando "Ronald" M. Llamas is a Filipino political commentator, strategist, activist, and former political affairs adviser to President Benigno Aquino III. He also served as the president of the Akbayan Citizens' Action Party, where he played an influential role in policy and political advisement.

== Education ==
Llamas studied at the University of Santo Tomas (UST), where he took a Bachelor of Arts degree in journalism from 1978 to 1982. During his university years, he was actively involved in student publications, serving as a writer for Hudyat and The Flame, and as features editor of The Varsitarian.

He is also a graduate of Notre Dame of Greater Manila, HS Class of 1978.

=== Student activism ===
During his college years, he became a writer. Llamas started working for the Faculty of Arts and Letters (AB) Student Council during 1981 as their leader.

== Political career ==
Philippine President Benigno Aquino III with Llamas on 25 May 2012

=== Akbayan ===
Leaving UST without graduating, Llamas became active in trade unionism, organized labor, and other sectoral groups. He helped in establishing several non-governmental organizations, which focused on different marginalized sectors.

Llamas became active in the campaign for the approval of the party-list law. He is one of the founding members and was the first president of Akbayan Citizens' Action Party in 1998, and served as one of the party leaders. In that year's national elections, Akbayan won one seat in the Philippine House of Representatives.

On February 25, 2006, he and other personalities were arrested in Santolan, Quezon City, while leading a protest rally. Those arrested included sociologist Randy David, lawyer Argee Guevarra, and Akbayan party-list representative Risa Hontiveros. The reason for the arrest was the lack of a permit. They were later released with all charges dropped. In May 2006, the Supreme Court declared the arrests invalid.

=== As Presidential Adviser on Political Affairs ===
He was initially appointed by President Benigno Aquino III as a member of the board of directors of the Development Bank of the Philippines (DBP) in 2010.

In 2011, he was appointed as presidential adviser for political affairs. The choice of President Benigno Aquino III to appoint him surprised some media outlets. Aquino later explained his choice that Llamas was a member of his coalition.

In October 2011, Llamas faced controversy when it was revealed that he owned an AK-47 rifle, which some considered a firearms violation. He also stated that he would resign if President Aquino questioned him about the issue. In February 2012, after buying pirated DVDs at Circle C Mall in Quezon City, he only got a reprimand from the president.

He was said to have played a significant role during the impeachment of Renato Corona, working in the background as an emissary to key personalities and groups. During his testimony before the Senate impeachment court, Chief Justice Renato Corona accused Llamas of controlling President Benigno Aquino III "by the neck" and that his impeachment was a "left-wing" plot hatched by Llamas and his "leftist" allies to take-over the government. Llamas denied these allegations, saying that "While I suppose I should be flattered that he attributed so much influence to me – which is so untrue – the obvious motivation behind the statement is to once again attribute the dire straits he finds himself in to a supposed conspiracy." President Aquino defended Llamas and Akbayan from Corona's accusations.

=== Post-cabinet career ===
After stepping down from his cabinet position, Llamas kept a low profile but remained active in cause-oriented groups. In December 2018, Paolo Duterte accused Llamas as part of a massive opposition network, including several politicians linked with the Liberal Party, Catholic bishops, and private companies, allegedly seeking to oust President Rodrigo Duterte from office. The alleged ouster network included the popular food chain Jollibee, the long-deceased Catholic bishop Julio Xavier Labayen, and a non-existent catholic bishop named "Arturo Santos". Defense Secretary Delfin Lorenzana dismissed the allegations made by Duterte and called them "fake news".

Llamas became active in the media after the death of Benigno Aquino III in 2021, regularly appearing on talk shows, news programs, and political discussions. He co-hosted One PH’s Wag Po! and Bilyonaryo News Channel's Kwatro Kantos.

Llamas has made frequent appearances on shows and podcasts like Facts First with Christian Esguerra, where he shares his perspective on current political events. Notably, one of his forecasts in the podcast was that then re-electionist Senator Ronald dela Rosa would lose in the 2025 elections, which eventually did not happen (as dela Rosa placed 3rd). Currently, he is the resident political pundit of One News’ “Storycon”. He currently pens a weekly newspaper column for The Philippine Star under the title The Political Heckler and for Pilipino Star Ngayon under the byline Bardagulan. He also wrote a weekly column for Abante.
