= 1953 Palanca Awards =

Philippine literary award

3rd Palanca Memorial Awards

The 3rd Carlos Palanca Memorial Awards for Literature was held to commemorate the memory of Carlos T. Palanca, Sr. through an endeavor that would promote education and culture in the country.

== English Division ==
=== Short Story ===
- First Prize: Andres Cristobal Cruz, "The Quarrel"
- Second Prize: N.V.M. Gonzales, "Lupo and the River"
- Third Prize: Rony V. Diaz, "The Centipede"

== Filipino Division ==
=== Maikling Kwento ===
- First Prize: Buenaventura S. Medina Jr., "Kapangyarihan"
- Second Prize: Hilario Coronel, "Ang Anluwage"
- Third Prize: Ponciano B. Pineda, "Malalim ang Gabi"

== Sources ==
- "The Don Carlos Palanca Memorial Awards for Literature | Winners 1953". Archived from the original on 2009-10-22.
