= Artistang Artlets =

Theatre guild of the UST Faculty of Arts and Letters

- Founded: July 3, 1980
- Founders: Marie Luz Datu; Nicolas Galvez, Jr.
- Type: Theatrical productions
- Location: Manila, Philippines
- Affiliations: University of Santo Tomas; UST Faculty of Arts and Letters; Philippine Educational Theater Association

Artistang Artlets, (formerly known as The Arts and Letters Theater Guild; now colloquially known with the abbreviation AA), is a Filipino theatre company founded by Marie Luz Datu and Nicolas Galvez, Jr. at the University of Santo Tomas. It was subsequently recognized as the official theatre guild of the UST Faculty of Arts and Letters.

AA is composed of writers, composers, actors, musicians, choreographers, and other theatrical production staff from the UST Faculty of Arts and Letters, constantly partnering with Teatro Tomasino and the Philippine Educational Theater Association for several productions.

== Select productions ==
Year	Title	Venue
2026	Hanggang Humupa	Pilar Hidalgo Lim Auditorium, Girl Scouts of the Philippines
2026	Sa Tama	Benavides Auditorium
2026	OKATOKAT	Tan Yan Kee Auditorium
2025	Binibining Maria Clara	TARC Auditorium
2025	UST'o Na!	Benavides Auditorium
2025	Mula sa Akin	Medicine Auditorium
2025	Abye	Benavides Auditorium
2024	Pagmaya, Pagsangli	TARC Auditorium
2020	Sundowning	Online
2018	Balikan	Albertus Magnus Auditorium
2017	VAW Experiential Museum	PETA Quezon City Theater
2016	Pendulum	Albertus Magnus Auditorium
2013	Dyip	Albertus Magnus Auditorium
2012	2B Kontinyud	Albertus Magnus Auditorium
2010	Anatomiya ng Pag-ibig	Rizal Auditorium

== Alumni ==
- Winnie Cordero
- Faye Martel
- Keavy Vicente
- Isay Alvarez
