= Keavy Eunice Vicente =

Filipino screenwriter

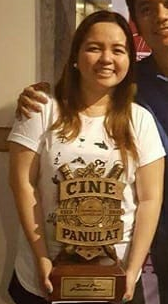
- Vicente in 2020
- Born: Keavy Eunice Evora Vicente
- Education: University of Santo Tomas
- Occupation: Writer
- Writing career
- Period: 2011-present
- Notable works: Unforgettable; Pearl Next Door
- Notable awards: Gawad Ustetika
- Website: IMDb page

Keavy Eunice Vicente is a Filipino screenwriter. She is most famous for writing Pearl Next Door, a girls love spin off of the Filipino boys love web series Gameboys.

== Education and personal life ==
Vicente attended and finished high school at Miriam College in 2007. She finished her journalism degree at the University of Santo Tomas, Manila in 2011. She was Artistic Director of the 30th season of the Artistang Artlets at the University of Santo Tomas Faculty of Arts and Letters.

== Select work ==
Productions
Year	Title	Role
2013	My Little Juan	Writer
2018	Distance	Writer
2019	Unforgettable	Writer
2020	I am U	Writer
2020	Pearl Next Door	Writer
