= Michael Anthony Vasco =

Filipino professor (born 1977)

Dean of the UST Graduate School
- Incumbent
- Assumed office 2019

Personal details
- Born: Michael Anthony C. Vasco; 1972 (age 53–54) Philippines
- Education: University of Santo Tomas
- Occupation: Professor
- Website: University of Santo Tomas Graduate School

Michael Anthony Vasco (born 1977) is a Filipino professor and educational administrator who currently serves as the dean of the graduate school of the University of Santo Tomas. He is also a Full Professor at the university's Faculty of Arts and Letters and Professorial Lecturer at the UST Graduate School.

== Education and career ==
Born in 1972, Vasco took his Bachelor of Arts, major in Philosophy (Cum Laude) at the UST Faculty of Arts and Letters in 1992. He then took his Master of Arts major in Philosophy (Benemeritus = Magna Cum Laude) in 1994 and Doctor of Philosophy major in Philosophy (Summa Cum Laude) in 1999 at the UST Graduate School. He was elevated to the rank of Professor in 2004. He became the College Secretary of the UST College of Nursing. His scholarly work focuses on Thomistic philosophy, Contemporary European philosophy, social and political philosophy, Indian philosophy, Buddhist philosophy and comparative philosophy.

He served as Dean of the Faculty of Arts and Letters from 2009 to 2019. During his Deanship, the Philosophy program was declared Center of Excellence, while the Literature, Communication and Journalism programs were declared Centers of Development by the CHED (Commission on Higher Education). The A.B. Philosophy, Literature, Economics and Legal Management programs were accorded Level 4 reaccredited and Level 4 1st reaccredited status, while the AB Asian Studies, Behavioral Science, Communication, Journalism, Political Science and Sociology programs were accorded Level 3 accreditation by the PACUCOA (Philippine Association of Colleges and Universities Commission on Accreditation). New academic programs were also introduced, such as A.B. History and A.B. English Language Studies in 2011, and A.B. Creative Writing in 2018.

He then served as Faculty Secretary of the Graduate School. In 2019, he was appointed as the Graduate School's Dean.

== Renato Corona and Graduate School controversy ==
Filipino educator Antonio Calipjo-Go requested the university for evaluation of his academic and professional work for college degree equivalence. The program is called Expanded Tertiary Education Equivalency and Accreditation Program (ETEEAP). This came after reports that the Graduate School had reportedly bent its rules to grant former Chief Justice Renato Corona a doctorate in law, summa cum laude. Vasco said Go's letters were “bereft of detail” and didn't even enclose “a simple curriculum vitae highlighting the professional and academic related achievements” impacting on the journalism degree sought.

== See also ==
- University of Santo Tomas
