= Hey It's Saberdey! =

2011–12 Philippine defunct television musical variety show

- Genre: Variety show
- Created by: TV5 Network, Inc.
- Developed by: TV5 Entertainment Division
- Written by: Wado Siman
- Directed by: Al Quinn
- Presented by: Alex Gonzaga; Kean Cipriano; JC de Vera; Danita Paner; IC Mendoza
- Country of origin: Philippines
- Original language: Filipino
- No. of episodes: 34

Production
- Executive producer: Faye Martel
- Running time: 1 hour

Original release
- Network: TV5
- Release: June 18, 2011 – February 4, 2012

Hey It's Saberdey! was a Saturday noontime musical variety show that aired on TV5. It aired from June 18, 2011, to February 4, 2012.

== Hosts ==
=== Main host ===
- Alex Gonzaga
- Kean Cipriano
- JC de Vera
- Danita Paner
- IC Mendoza
- Mo Twister

=== Performers ===
- Arci Muñoz
- Dianne Medina
- Rodjun Cruz
- Jasmine Curtis-Smith
- Rainier Castillo
- Carla Humphries
- Edgar Allan Guzman
- Lucky Mercado
- Jay Durias
- Gerald Santos
- Wendy Valdez
- Princess Ryan
- Yana Asistio
- Annyka Asistio
- Ritz Azul
- Morissette Amon
- Christian Samson
- Meg Imperial
- Aki Torio
- Eula Caballero
- Rico dela Paz
- Shy Carlos
- AJ Muhlach
- Nadine Lustre
- Josh Padilla

== Studios ==
- Westside Studio, Broadway Centrum (TV5 Broadway Centrum, June 18, 2011, to February 4, 2012)

== See also ==
- List of TV5 (Philippine TV network) original programming
