= Unforgettable (2019 film) =

Filipino film

- Theatrical release poster
- Directed by: Jun Robles Lana; Perci Inatalan
- Screenplay by: Keavy Eunice Vicente; Ash M. Malanum
- Story by: Jun Robles Lana
- Produced by: Vic del Rosario Jr.
- Starring: Sarah Geronimo
- Cinematography: Mackie Galvez
- Edited by: Lawrence Ang
- Music by: Emerzon Texon
- Production companies: Viva Films; The IdeaFirst Company
- Distributed by: Viva Films
- Release date: October 23, 2019
- Running time: 86 minutes
- Country: Philippines
- Language: Filipino
- Box office: ₱150 million

Unforgettable is a 2019 Filipino drama film starring Sarah Geronimo, directed by Perci Intalan and Jun Robles Lana. The film was released in cinemas on October 23, 2019, under Viva Films. It also stars the celebrity dog Milo, Gina Pareño, Ara Mina, Meg Imperial and Kim Molina. Sarah Geronimo won Best Actress Award at the 4th Guild of Educators, Mentors, and Students (GEMS) Hiyas ng Sining Awards.

== Synopsis ==
Jasmine, a young woman with autism takes her new found canine friend Happy on a journey to her grandmother in Baguio, where they face challenges and help strangers along the way.

== Cast ==
=== Main cast ===
- Sarah Geronimo as Jasmine Mijandro Lagman
- Milo (Celebrity dog) as Happy

=== Supporting cast ===
- Gina Pareño as Lola Olive Mijandro
- Ara Mina as Dahlia Lagman
- Yayo Aguila as Nanette
- Kim Molina as Chuchay
- Meg Imperial as Violet Lagman
- Caleb Santos as Carlo
- Lander Vera-Perez as Mark Lagman
- Alessandra Malonzo as Sabi Lagman
- Lhian Gimeno as Cia Lagman

=== Special participation ===
- Tirso Cruz III as Lola Olive's doctor
- Anne Curtis as Nurse Gem
- Arlene Muhlach as Dulce Mijandro
- Angie Castrence as Ella Lagman
- Gene Padilla as Pido Lagman
- Cherie Gil as Customer
- Regine Velasquez-Alcasid as Janet
- Alessandra de Rossi as Dog pound staff
- Marco Gumabao as Happy's doctor
- Dennis Padilla as a taxi driver
- Delfin Geronimo as Dog pound driver
- Empoy Marquez
- Precious Anika Reuyan as marketer
- Bob Jbeili as Je, Chuchay's Friend

== Reception ==
=== Box office ===
Unforgettable performed moderately upon release, earning ₱5.1 million on its first day on the theaters. The film saw an increase on its second day, earning ₱8 million.
