= Alejandro G. Abadilla =

Filipino poet, essayist and fiction writer

- Born: March 10, 1906; Rosario, Cavite, Philippine Islands
- Died: August 26, 1969 (aged 63)
- Other names: AGA
- Occupations: Poet; essayist; fiction writer
- Known for: Ako ang Daigdig

Alejandro G. Abadilla (March 10, 1906 – August 26, 1969), commonly known as AGA, was a Filipino poet, essayist, and fiction writer. Critic Pedro Ricarte referred to Abadilla as the father of modern Philippine poetry, and was known for challenging established forms and literature's "excessive romanticism and emphasis on rhyme and meter". Abadilla helped found the Kapisanang Panitikan in 1935 and edited a magazine called Panitikan. His Ako ang Daigdig collection of poems is one of his better-known works.

== Early life ==
Abadilla was born to an average Filipino family on March 10, 1906, in Rosario, Cavite. He finished elementary school at Sapa Barrio School, then continued for high school education in Cavite City. After graduation, he went abroad and worked for a small printing shop in Seattle, Washington. He edited several sections of the Philippine Digest, Philippines-American Review and established Kapisanang Balagtas (Balagtas' Organization). In 1934, he returned to the Philippines where he finished AB Philosophy at the University of Santo Tomas. Until 1934, he became a municipal councilor of Salinas before shifting to an insurance selling job.

== Major works ==
Aside from writing Ako ang Daigdig, Abadilla wrote several poems and a compilation of his works:

- Mga Kuwentong Ginto (Golden Stories) – he co-edited with Clodualdo del Mundo.
- Mga Piling Katha: Ang Maikling Kathang Tagalog (Chosen Works: An Anthology of Short Stories in Tagalog) – he co-edited with F.B. Sebastian and A.D.G. Mariano.
- Maiikling Katha (Short Stories) – together with Commission on the Filipino Language head Ponciano B.P. Pineda.
- Mga Piling Sanaysay (Several Essays).
- Parnasong Tagalog: Katipunan ng Mga Piling Tula Mula Kina Huseng Sisiw at Balagtas Hanggang sa Kasalukuyang Panahon ng Pamumulaklak at Pagkaunlad (Tagalog Works: Compilation of Poems from Huseng Sisiw through Francisco Balagtas until Present Times of Flourishing Philippine Poetry).
- Ako ang Daigdig at Iba Pang Mga Tula (I am the World and Other Poems).
- Tanagabadilla, Una at Ikalawang Aklat (Tanagabadilla: First and Second Books)- a compilation of Abadilla's tanagas. In Filipino poetry, a tanaga is a short poem of one stanza with 7-7-7-7 syllabic verse, with an AAAA rhyme scheme. Usually, a tanaga is embedded with symbols. Tanagabadilla is a coined term consisting of tanaga and Abadilla.
- Pagkamulat
- "Awit 101866"

== "Ako ang Daigdig" ==
According to Pedro Ricarte, Abadilla's major breakthrough in Philippine poetry was when he wrote the poem "Ako ang Daigdig" ("I Am the World") in 1955. Initially, poetry critics rejected the poem since it does not follow the traditional poetry that uses rhyme and meter. In the poem, the repetition of the words ako (I), daigdig (world) and tula (poem) leaves an impression that the poet, Abadilla, is not himself. The speaker of the poem says that he himself, his world of poem and his poems are united as one.
