= Marilu Madrunio =

Filipino applied linguist

Marilu R. Madrunio
- Born: Marilu Rañosa; Manila
- Education: College of the Holy Spirit Manila (BA); University of Santo Tomas (MA); De La Salle University Manila (PhD)
- Occupation: Professor
- Writing career
- Notable works: Assessment education of pre-service English teachers in the Philippines in English language teacher preparation in Asia: Policy, Research and Practice published by Routledge (2019)

Marilu Rañosa Madrunio is an applied linguist. Her works have been published in various international publications on World Englishes, Philippine English, English sociolinguistics, English language education and Forensic Linguistics.

She is a professor at the University of Santo Tomas. As the pioneer of forensic linguistics in the Philippines, Dean Madrunio of English was elected into the International Association of Forensic Linguistics as an Ordinary Member in the executive committee in 2019. Her term as Ordinary Member would end in 2023. She was Dean of the University of Santo Tomas Graduate School from 2013 to 2019 and was the Dean of the University of Santo Tomas Faculty of Arts and Letters in Manila, Philippines from 2019 to 2022.

She was the first Filipino recipient of the EFL Foreign Educators Program in Georgetown University, Washington, DC awarded by the US State Department in 2010. In 2013, she became the holder of the Br. Andrew Gonzalez, FSC Distinguished Professorial Chair in Linguistics and Language Education awarded by De La Salle University. In 2019, she also became the holder of the Fr. Valentin Marin, OP Professorial Chair in Communication awarded by the University of Santo Tomas. She is a regular speaker at the Philippine Judicial Academy (PHILJA), the education arm of the Supreme Court of the Philippines.

== Education ==
Madrunio took a BA in English at College of the Holy Spirit Manila in 1982, a MA in English summa cum laude at the University of Santo Tomas in 1997, and a PhD in applied linguistics with distinction at De La Salle University in 2003. Madrunio has a diploma in TESOL from the SEAMEO Regional Language Centre in Singapore. She also has a certificate in Forensic Linguistics from the International Summer School in Forensic Linguistic Analysis (ISSFLA) which was held in Malaysia in 2012.

== Select bibliography ==
- “What’s in my medicine?”: Evaluating the readability and comprehensibility of patient information leaflets of selected Philippine nonprescription drugs (2020)
- Move Structure and Terms of Agreement Reflecting Legal Value in Memoranda of Agreement on Academic Partnerships (MOA) (2020)
- Language and Power in the Courtroom: Examining the Discourse in the Philippine Rape Trials (2016)
- The interrogator and the interrogated: The questioning process in Philippine courtroom discourse (2013)
- English Language Teacher Preparation in Asia: Policy, research, practice (2019)
- English language education in the Philippines: Policies, problems, and prospects (2016)
- Power and Control in Philippine Courtroom Discourse (2014)
- English language instruction in the Philippines: Methods and practices (2013)

== See also ==
- University of Santo Tomas
