= Alfredo Co =

Sinologist

Alfredo P. Co 许培堆
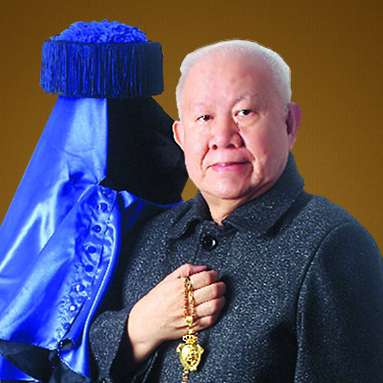
- Born: November 30, 1949 (age 76)
- Education: University of Santo Tomas; Chinese University of Hong Kong; Université Paris-Sorbonne
- Occupations: Philosopher, Sinologist
- Writing career
- Language: English, Min Nan Chinese (Hokkien), French, Filipino, Bikolano, Cebuano
- Genres: Chinese philosophy Comparative Philosophy

Alfredo Pimentel Co (Chinese: 许培堆; born on November 30, 1949) is a Filipino Sinologist and philosopher. He is the only contemporary Asian scholar to deliver a plenary lecture at the COMIUCAP conference, in 2008.

== Early years and education ==
In 1967, Co was named "Outstanding Chinese Youth in the Philippines" by the Republic of China during his sophomore year in high school in Naga City. Co graduated with a philosophy degree at the Faculty of Arts and Letters at the Pontifical and Royal University of Santo Tomas in 1972 and earned a master's degree in 1974. He also earned a doctorate degree in 1976 at the same university.

== Career ==
Co holds two post-doctorates and two fellowships abroad. He was a Special Scholar of the "Soka University" to the International Asian Studies Program of the Chinese University of Hong Kong for his Post Doctorate on Chinese Classical Philosophy from 1977 to 1978. He took classes in French at the Universite de Poitiers, Technical French at Universite de Bordeaux, and Comparative Philosophy at the Paris Sorbonne University as a French Government Scholar from 1979 to 1981. He wrote a dissertation in French entitled: La notion de Yi chez Kong Zi et la concepcion de la liberte chez Jean-Jacques Rousseau: La Politique du devoir et la politique du droit (The Notion of Yi in Confucius and the Concept of Liberty in Jean-Jacques Rosseau: The Politics of Duty and the Politics of Liberty).

He was also Special Fellow of the Pacific Cultural Foundation of Taiwan and a Special Fellow of the International Society for Intercultural Studies and Research (India). He has been invited as visiting professor in Ateneo de Manila University, De la Salle University, and University of San Carlos.

He founded the Philosophy Circle of the Philippines in 1972, and at present, he is the incumbent president of the Philippine Academy of Philosophical Research and the Editor of Karunungan – A Journal of Philosophy. He is also a member of the Federation Internationale des Societies de Philosophie based in Fribourg, Switzerland, the Asian Association of the Catholic Philosophers, and Vice President for Asia of the Conférence Mondiale des Institutions Universitaires Catholiques de Philosophie. Co is also consultant to CULTURE and Quest, a publication of the University of Calcutta, India; UNITAS, UNITAS journal of the U.S.T.; and BUDHI, a journal of Ateneo de Manila. He is currently a chair of the Philippine Commission on Higher Education's (CHED) Technical Committee for Philosophy and a full Professor of Philosophy in U.S.T.

In 2008, along with Franck Budenholzer, Juan Luis Scannone, and Jean-Luc Marion, Co was the first and only Asian scholar to date to deliver a plenary lecture at any COMIUCAP conference.

In 2017, Co was conferred the title Professor Emeritus by the University of Santo Tomas. The title is conferred to faculty members who have reached retirement but highly distinguished due to excellence in teaching, research, or extension services. This distinction was conferred due to local and international recognitions, publications, and university commendations. As Professor Emeritus, Co continues to teach at the University of Santo Tomas both at the undergraduate and graduate levels.

== Bibliography ==
- Across the Ancient Philosophical World (2015)
- La Philosophie Comparee : Sur la politique l'humour, et la transcendance (2009)
- Ethics and Philosophy of the Human Person (2009)
- Issues in Eastern Philosophy, Arts, and Culture (2009)
- 5 Comparative Philosophy and Postmodern Thoughts (2009)
- Doing philosophy in the Philippines and other essays (2009)
- Two Filipino Thomasian Philosophers on Postmodernism (2004)
- Under the Bo Tree, On the Lotus Flower (2003)
- The Blooming of a Hundred Flowers (1992)

== Festschrift ==
In 2010 he was awarded with an eight-volume festschrift by the University of Santo Tomas to honor him for his distinguished and outstanding achievements in the field of Philosophy. The Festschrift that contains collection of his writings and celebratory essays by colleagues and former students is considered a milestone in the history of philosophy in the Philippines.
