= Wado Siman =

- Born: Eduardo Tan Siman; 22 June 1988 (age 38); UST Hospital; Manila, Philippines
- Education: University of Santo Tomas
- Culinary career
- Cooking style: Filipino; Italian; Asian; Fusion; French; Pastries
- Current restaurant: Wadoughs
- Website: RestaurantGuru Page for Wadough's

Wado Siman (Tagalog pronunciation: [ˈwado ˈsiman], born Eduardo Tan Siman; June 22, 1988) is a Filipino chef, entrepreneur, entertainment producer, screenwriter, and television personality in the Philippines. He owns the Wadoughs Cafe at Sikatuna Village and Brutal in Quezon City, Philippines.

== Early career ==
Siman finished high school in 2006 at the Sacred Heart College in Lucena City, Quezon Province and finished his undergraduate in communication at the University of Santo Tomas in 2010. Siman was a student leader in the University of Santo Tomas and was active with extra-curricular, being president of the now reorganized Tomasian Cable Television and an actor for university theatre guild Teatro Tomasino.

Siman played the role of the English-speaking pedicab driver in the television show Wow Mali.

== Wadoughs ==
Siman started Wadoughs as an online business in 2012, while he is producing and writing for television. He joined food bazaars and weekend markets to sell his creations and became a finalist in a reality television show The Clash: Search for the Next Great Dessert Master. From then, Siman bagged the grand prize for Globe Pitch Tuesdays’ search for the next big food entrepreneur.

== Minimalist Cakes ==
Due to the COVID-19 lockdown in the Philippines, more people have been further exposed to Korean content on streaming television and music platforms. With the trends of the dalgona coffee and baked samgyup coming to the Philippines, the minimalist cakes were also hyped online. Wadoughs trended over social media by posting minimalist cakes with captions relating to Filipino sentiments during the lockdown.

== Television credits ==
Production
Year	Title	Role	Network
2010	Wow Mali	Writer	TV5
2010	Everybody Hapi	Writer	TV5
2011	Hey It's Saberdey!	Writer	TV5
2011	Lokomoko U	Writer	TV5
2011	Sugo Mga Kapatid	Writer	TV5
2012	Artista Academy	Writer	TV5
2012	Sunday Funday	Writer	TV5
2014	The Clash: Search for the Next Great Dessert Master	Contestant	Lifestyle
2015	Ingredients of Success	Host	IBC 13
2016	A Pinch of Portia	Writer	Metro Channel
2017	Ang Foodtrip Ko	Host	Chinatown TV
2018	Women of Style with Joey Mead King	Producer	Metro Channel
