= Ophelia Dimalanta =

Filipino poet, editor, author, and academician (1932-2010)

- Born: Ophelia Alcantara; June 16, 1932; San Juan, Rizal, Philippine Islands, U.S.
- Died: November 4, 2010 (aged 78); Navotas, Philippines
- Education: University of Santo Tomas
- Occupations: Author, poet
- Writing career
- Notable work: Montage
- Notable awards: S.E.A. Write Award

Ophelia Alcantara Dimalanta (June 16, 1932 – November 4, 2010) was a Filipino poet, editor, author, and academician. One of the country's most respected writers, Dimalanta published several books of poetry, criticism, drama, and prose and edited various literary anthologies. In 1999, she received Southeast Asia's highest literary honor, the S.E.A. Write Award.

== Early years ==
Born in San Juan, Rizal (part of modern day Metro Manila) in the Philippines, Dimalanta took up her bachelor's degree, Master's Degree, and Doctor of Philosophy at the University of Santo Tomas (UST). Trained as a concert pianist, Dimalanta focused on poetry, publishing her first collection of poems, Montage in 1974.

== Career ==
Dimalanta served as the Writer in Residence and a Full Professor of Literature and Creative Writing at the UST Graduate School and at the Faculty of Arts and Letters until her untimely passing. During her academic career, she held various administrative posts, including the position of Dean of the Faculty of Arts and Letters and Director of the Center for Creative Writing and Studies.

A panelist for various writing workshops at UST, University of the Philippines, Silliman University in Dumaguete, and Mindanao State University-Iligan Institute of Technology in Iligan, Dimalanta served as a judge in prominent literary award-giving bodies such as the National Book Awards by the Manila Critics' Circle, Philippines Free Press Literary Awards, and Don Carlos Palanca Memorial Awards for Literature. This status, alongside her teaching experience, enabled her to reach and influence generations of journalists and creative writers like Recah Trinidad, Arnold Azurin, Cirilo Bautista, Albert B. Casuga, Cristina Pantoja-Hidalgo, Eric Gamalinda, Jose Neil Garcia, Mike Coroza, and Lourd de Veyra.

Dimalanta published several books in her lifetime: seven books on poetry, one on drama, one on criticism, and one on her collected prose. Her first collection of poems, Montage, won the Iowa State University Best Poetry Award (1969), and first prize (poetry category) in the Palanca Memorial Awards for Literature (1974).

She was a founding member and served as chairman of the Manila Critics Circle and an honorary fellow of the Philippine Literary Arts Council. Poet and critic Cirilo F. Bautista hailed her as "not only our foremost woman poet but also one of the best poets writing now, regardless of gender."

Dimalanta also wrote critical reviews in international journals and local periodicals and taught at Colegio de San Juan de Letran and De La Salle University. The Ateneo de Manila University honored Dimalanta with the 13th Paz Marquez-Benitez Memorial Lecture and Exhibit which was organized by the Ateneo Library of Women’s Writings (Aliww).

In 2002, UST published Dimalanta's verse drama, "Lorenzo Ruiz, Escribano: A Play in Two Acts," with a Filipino translation by Florentino H. Hornedo and Michael M. Coroza. It was premiered on 22–24 February 1994 at UST in a production directed by Isagani R. Cruz.

Aside from her career in Literature, Dimalanta is also known to have founded in 1995 the UST Faculty of Arts and Letters' official choir, the UST Chorus of Arts and Letters, (or the AB Chorale) with Mr. Paulo Zarate as its first musical director. She also penned the lyrics of the Hymn of the said Faculty.

Dimalanta lived with her family until her death in Navotas.

== her works ==
Poetry

- Finder Loser
- Montage (1974)
- Time Factor (1983)
- Flowing On (1988)
- Lady Polyester (1993)
- Love Woman (1998)
- Passional (2002)
- The Ophelia Alcantara Dimalanta Reader, Volume 1, Poetry (2005)

Criticism

- The Philippine Poetic

Anthology

- Anthology of Philippine Contemporary Literature
- Readings from Contemporary English

Prose

- The Ophelia Alcantara Dimalanta Reader, Volume 2, Prose (2006)

Drama

- Lorenzo Ruiz, Escribano: A Play in Two Acts (2002)

== Honors ==
- Poet and Critic Best Poem Award from Iowa State University (1968)
- Palanca Awards for Poetry (1974, 1983)
- Fernando Maria Guerrero Award (1976)
- Focus Literary Award for Fiction (1977, 1981)
- Cultural Center of the Philippines Literature Grant for Criticism (1983)
- Gawad Pambansang Alagad ni Balagtas from the Writers' Union of the Philippines (1990)
- Southeast Asia (SEA) Write Award from King Bhumibol of Thailand (1999)
- Parangal Hagbong, University of Santo Tomas (2008)
