= Faye Martel =

Filipino entertainment executive

- Born: March 9, 1972 (age 54); Sampaloc, Manila
- Education: University of Santo Tomas (BA); Ateneo de Manila University (MA); University of the Philippines Diliman (PhD)
- Occupations: Producer, Actress, Content Creator, Professor
- Website: IMDB-Faye Martel; Faye__TH Tiktok

Faye Martel Abugan (née Martel; born March 9, 1972) is a Filipino entertainment executive, producer, director, actress, professor, content creator, and educational administrator.

== Early years and education ==
Martel graduated from Sacred Heart Academy of Novaliches in 1989 and proceeded to the University of Santo Tomas to pursue a bachelor's degree in communication. She was a member of the Artistang Artlets, the theatre society of the UST Faculty of Arts and Letters. Martel graduated in 1993. She attained her Master of Arts in communication from the Ateneo de Manila University in 2008, and has been admitted to the University of the Philippines Diliman doctorate program with concentration on media studies.

== Career ==
Martel started working in media as road manager for the Filipino hip hop group Masta Plann and as production assistant at the Associated Broadcasting Company (ABC5). She was a longtime faculty adviser of the Tomasian Cable Television and the UST Tiger Radio which operate under the UST Educational Technology Center. The latter was reorganized in 2018 to become the UST Communications Bureau. Martel is the Founding Director of the UST Educational Broadcasting Unit. She is a tenured professor in the University of Santo Tomas, teaching at the UST Faculty of Arts and Letters and at the UST College of Fine Arts and Design with the rank of Assistant Professor. She is known for teaching courses on television production and theatre arts, and directing shows and events within the said university. She retired from UST in 2026, after more than 3 decades with the university, stating her plans to venture into content creation.

Martel was an Executive Producer for several shows of TV5 Network from 1994 to 2016. She has been involved in several television programs and movies, and was credited as an actress in the 2007 film Tribu by Jim Libiran.

Martel was awarded by the University of Santo Tomas as a Distinguished Thomasian Alumna in November 2025.

== Bibliography ==
- Toward Cultural Diversity and Symbiosis in Asian Media (2005)
- Asian Media Project for Media Literacy and Cross Cultural Communication in 5 countries (2018)

== Select television credits ==
Production
Year	Title	Role	Network
1996	Wow Mali	Segment Producer	TV5
1996	Eezy Dancing	Supervising Editor	TV5
1998	Sing Galing! (1998 TV program)	Segment Producer	TV5
2000	By Request	Executive Producer	TV5
2004	Anime Ring Kaisho	Executive Producer	TV5
2006	Believe it or not	Executive Producer	TV5
2008	Everybody Hapi	Executive Producer	TV5
2008	Kiddie Kwela	Executive Producer	TV5
2010	Camp Tiger	Executive Producer	TV5
2010	McDonald's Kiddie Summer Workshop Special	Executive Producer	TV5
2011	Hey It's Saberdey!	Executive Producer	TV5
2012	Sugo mga Kapatid	Executive Producer	TV5
2012	Artista Academy	Executive Producer	TV5
2012	Sunday Funday	Executive Producer	TV5
2013	Boracay Bodies	Executive Producer	TV5
2013	Misibis Bay	Assistant Director	TV5
2012	Tropa Mo Ko Unli	Assistant Director	TV5
2013	SpinNation	Executive Producer	TV5
2015	Who Wants to be a Millionaire?	Executive Producer	TV5
2015	Move It: Clash of the Streetdancers	Executive Producer	TV5
2021	John En Ellen	Line Producer	TV5
