= Liza Lopez-Rosario =

Filipino lawyer

Dean of the UST Graduate School of Law
- In office 2017–2024

Personal details
- Born: Maria Liza Lopez; October 12, 1963 (age 62) Philippines
- Education: University of Santo Tomas (BA, LLB, BCL); Universidad Complutense de Madrid (DCL)
- Occupation: Professor, Lawyer

Maria Liza A. Lopez-Rosario (born October 15, 1963) is a Filipino lawyer, professor, author, and educational administrator. She is also an expert on the canon law of the Catholic Church.

== Education ==
Lopez-Rosario is a graduate of the University of Santo Tomas for her degrees of Bachelor of Arts in Philosophy magna cum laude in 1984 and her Bachelor of Laws magna cum laude in 1988. She attained her Doctor of Civil Law cum laude degree in 1997 from the Universidad Complutense de Madrid in Spain, where she also worked as an au pair.

She also earned her Bachelor in Canon Law in 2013 from the UST Faculty of Canon Law.

== Career ==
Lopez-Rosario started her legal career as a public attorney. She started teaching at UST Law since 1989. She is a senior associate at Romulo Mabanta Buenaventura Sayoc & De Los Angeles. Lopez-Rosario was a bar examiner for civil law in the 2014 Philippine Bar Examination. She authored Natural Moral Law and Philippine Civil Law.

Lopez-Rosario is the legal counsel of the Roman Catholic Diocese of Parañaque, Roman Catholic Archdiocese of Manila, and the Catholic Bishops Conference of the Philippines. Cardinal Jaime Sin was among her former clients. She is the inaugural dean of the University of Santo Tomas Graduate School of Law, founded in 2017.

== See also ==
- University of Santo Tomas Faculty of Arts and Letters
- University of Santo Tomas Faculties of Ecclesiastical Studies
- University of Santo Tomas Faculty of Civil Law
- Universidad Complutense de Madrid
