= Avelina Gil =

Filipino writer (1917–2021)

- Born: Avelina Juan; 12 May 1917; Laoag, Ilocos Norte, Philippines
- Died: 20 April 2021 (aged 103)
- Occupation: Writer
- Spouse: Genero Gil
- Children: 10

Avelina Gil (née Juan, 12 May 1917 – 20 April 2021) was a Filipino writer.

== Personal life and education ==
Avelina Juan was born 12 May 1917 in the city of Laoag in the Philippine province of Ilocos Norte. Her parents were Valentin S. Juan, a captain in the Philippine Constabulary and Visitacion Raval, a school supervisor and political and civic leader. In 1932 she received her teaching diploma from Zamboanga Normal School. She was awarded a B.Sc. degree in Education cum laude in 1936 by the University of the Philippines.

In 1955, she completed a master's degree in English at the University of Santo Tomas. In 1972, she completed a doctorate at the University of the Philippines.

Avelina Juan married Genero Gil and they had ten children, four of whom reached adulthood. She died on 20 April 2021, at the age of 103.

== Career ==
Gil was known for her writing, which she produced while working as a teacher and lecturer. She wrote textbooks about English communication in the arts and literature as well as poems, children's books and essays.

Gil began teaching at Zamboanga Normal School in 1938 and later taught in schools in the cities of Lucena and Bacolod. After the end of the Second World War, she lectured at Philippine Normal College, University of San Carlos, and the University of the East. Gil was a member of the Board for Professional Teachers of the Professional Regulating Commission.

After retiring from academia, she was editor-in-chief at Phoenix Publishing House in Manila from 1977 to 1988.

== Publications ==
Gil has written a large number of books that include:

- A critical analysis of the post war English courses of the University of San Carlos, Cebu City (scriptie; 1955)
- Reading for skill and pleasure (1964)
- Reading for skill and pleasure [for] first year (1964, 1972)
- World horizons : reading for skill and growth (1965, 1972)
- Beyond Philippine shores (1973)
- This challenging world (1973)
- Adventures in communication (1976)
- Our challenging world (1977)
- Beyond Philippine shores Grade VI (1977)
- Youth in today's world - Asia and Africa (1977)
- In the beginning: reading in folk literature (1977, 1994)
- New reading for learning and living 5 (1983)
- English studies for college (1984)
- Adventures in English (1985, 1992)
- Horizons near and far (1988)
- Literature and art (1988)
- Literature and art : first year : teachers guide (1988)
- Skill builders for efficient reading (1988)
- Phoenix english for secondary schools 1 (1989)
- Phoenix English series: teacher's guide (1990)
- Across the country (1994)
- Dialogue: : teaching computer literacy in today's schools
- Narratives Old & New: And Other Selections (2013)

Gil also published in academic journals. These include:

- Avelina Gil (1973) Mayyang and the crab: A Cinderella variant. Philippines Quarterly of Culture and Society volume 1, pages 26–32.
- Avelina Gil (1973) The farmer's wife: portraits by Gonzalez, Arguilla and Villa. Philippines Quarterly of Culture and Society volume 1, pages 86–91.

== Awards ==
Gil received several awards for writing, including a Distinguished Achievement in Education Award for outstanding textbook writer from the UP Education Alumni Association in 1986, Centennial Award for Education and Resource Developments in 1988 and National Centennial-Women Sector Award in 1998.

In 2017 she was awarded P100,000 and a plaque of recognition by the Makati City government for becoming a centenarian living in the city.
