= Jeffrey Tarayao =

Filipino business executive (born 1980)

- Born: March 9, 1980 (age 46); Sampaloc, Manila
- Education: Holy Infant Montessori Center; Lourdes School of Quezon City; Pontifical and Royal University of Santo Tomas; Harvard University; Macquarie University
- Occupations: President, OneMeralco

Jeffrey Tarayao (born March 9, 1980) is a Filipino business executive. He is currently President of OneMeralco Foundation, the corporate foundation and social development arm of the Manila Electric Company, the largest electric utility company in the Philippines. He is currently a faculty member of the University of Santo Tomas.

Tarayao was formerly Head of Community Relations for Globe Telecom, a major telecommunications corporation in the Philippines, owned by the Zóbel de Ayala family through the Ayala Corporation. He is also a former student leader in the Philippines.

== Early life and education ==
Tarayao was born in the charity ward of University of Santo Tomas Hospital to Pito Tarayao and Leny Ochoa. He attended Holy Infant Montessori Center and Lourdes School of Quezon City for basic education, and proceeded to the University of Santo Tomas for his Bachelor in Communication degree. He graduated with honors in 2001.

He holds a Master in Sustainable Development degree from Macquarie University, Sydney which he attained in 2018.

== One Meralco Foundation ==
Tarayao leads Meralco's corporate social responsibility projects and the company's communications thrusts. Several business communications and advocacy campaigns under his leadership were awarded by the Philippine Gold Quill Awards.

He was recognized by Devex's Manila as one of the 40 Under 40, for the school electrification program of Meralco launched in 2012.
