= Philippine Journal of Allied Health Sciences =

- Discipline: Physical therapy, Occupational therapy, Sports Science, Speech language pathology, Allied health sciences
- Language: English
- Edited by: Ivan Neil B. Gomez, PhD

Publication details
- History: 2006–2008; 2019–present
- Publisher: University of Santo Tomas-College of Rehabilitation Sciences (Philippines)
- Frequency: Biannually

Standard abbreviations
- ISO 4: Philipp. J. Allied Health Sci.

Indexing
- ISSN: 1908-5044

Links
- Journal homepage

The Philippine Journal of Allied Health Sciences is the official scientific journal of the University of Santo Tomas- College of Rehabilitation Sciences and is published biannually. It is a peer-reviewed journal which encourages authors to publish original scholarly articles in the field of human biomechanics, exercise physiology, physical activity in pediatrics and geriatrics, ergonomics, physiologic profiling of athletes, sports injury monitoring, and clinical practice patterns. An 11-year gap between volumes 2 and 3 is due to the difficulty of sustaining enough quality articles for publication in the journal.

== List of editors-in-chief ==
- Janine Margarita R. Dizon (2006–2008)
- Ivan Neil Gomez (2019–present)
