= Cristina Pantoja-Hidalgo =

Filipina fictionist, critic and pioneering writer

Cristina Pantoja-Hidalgo (born Cristina Pantoja on August 21, 1944) is a Filipina fictionist, critic and pioneering writer of creative nonfiction. She is currently Professor Emeritus of English & Comparative Literature at the University of the Philippines Diliman and Director of the University of Santo Tomas (UST) Center for Creative Writing and Literary Studies. She was given the S.E.A Write Award for Literature for 2020 by the Royal Family of Thailand in 2023.

== Academic career ==
Pantoja-Hidalgo is a high school valedictorian of St. Paul College Quezon City. She received both her Bachelor of Philosophy (Faculty of Philosophy and Letters) (1964) magna cum laude and MA in Literature (1967), meritissimus, from the University of Santo Tomas. She later received a PhD in Comparative Literature from the University of the Philippines Diliman in 1993. She is a member of the Philippine Literary Arts Council (PLAC).

She previously served as the Vice President for Public Affairs of the University of the Philippines System, Director of the University of the Philippines Press and coordinator of the Creative Writing Program at the Department of English and Comparative Literature of the University of the Philippines Diliman. At UST, Pantoja-Hidalgo held the post of UST Publishing House Director.

Before and after her fifteen years abroad, Hidalgo was a teacher first at the University of Santo Tomas and later at the University of the Philippines. Completing the requirements for her PhD in Comparative Literature, Hidalgo has found many opportunities to read Literary Theory as well as put these into practice in her own works. Hidalgo claimed that she had never considered herself a literary critic; but, just the same, she found it useful to collect five of her critical essays in A Gentle Subversion: Essays on Philippine Fiction in English (1998).

== Literary career ==
Pantoja-Hidalgo has been writing for Philippine newspapers and magazines since the age of fifteen. She has worked as a writer, editor and teacher in Thailand, Lebanon, Korea, Myanmar (Burma) and New York, United States. Her interesting lifestyle, the result of her husband's fifteen-year connection with UNICEF, is reflected in her writing. Pantoja-Hidalgo was originally best known for an unusual kind of autobiographical/travel writing, which includes Sojourns (1984), Skyscrapers, Celadon and Kimchi (1993), I Remember (1991) and The Path of the Heart (1994), "Passages: Travel Essays" (2007), "Looking for the Philippines" (2009), and "Travels With Tania" (2009). Pantoja-Hidalgo later won numerous prizes for her fiction, creative nonfiction, literary scholarship and edited anthologies. She has frequently published many of her creative and critical manuscripts in major publications in Finland, Korea, the Philippines, Thailand and the United States.

Besides travel essays, Hidalgo has published collections of personal essays, The Path of Heart (1994),Coming Home (1997) and "Stella and Other Friendly Ghosts" (2012). She has also edited several anthologies, like "Creative Nonfiction: A Reader" (2003, 2005), "The Children's Hour" (2007, 2008), "Sleepless in Manila: Funny Essays, Etc. on Insomnia by Insomniacs" (2003), "My Fair Maladies: Funny Essays and Poems on Various Ailments and Afflictions" (2005), and "Tales of Fantasy and Enchantment" (2008).

She has encouraged many aspiring writers' efforts by editing their works: Shaking the Family Tree (1998) and Why I Travel and Other Essays by Fourteen Women (2000) with Erlinda Panlilio. Hidalgo found the idea of writing short and simple initiation stories appealing. It reflects in her collection of short stories: Ballad of a Lost Season and Other Stories (1987), Tales for a Rainy Night (1993), Where Only the Moon Rages: Nine Tales (1994), Catch a Falling Star (1999) and the most recent one Sky Blue After The Rain: Selected Stories and Tales (2005).

Hidalgo's critical essays, which reflect her interest in fictional writing by Filipino women, serves a much-needed contribution to a developing body of feminist scholarship in the country today. These are: "Filipino Woman Writing: Home and Exile in the Autobiographical Narratives of Filipino Women" (1994, 2015); "Fabuilists and Chroniclers" (2008); "Over a Cup of Ginger Tea: Conversations on the Narratives of Filipino Women"; "A Gentle Subversion: Essays on Philippine Fiction" (1998)

She received the Southeast Asia Write Award (S.E.A. Write Award), given by the Royal Family of Thailand, on Aug. 10, 2024 in Bangkok, Thailand. The award is presented annually, since 1979, to selected Southeast Asian writers, generally for lifetime achievement, but sometimes also for a specific work. She has also received other lifetime achievement awards, such as the Dangal ng Lahi Award from the Carlos Palanca Memorial Awards, and the Gawad Balagtas from Unyong ng mga Manunulat sa Pilipinas (UMPIL). She has also received the Carlos Palanca Grand Prize for the Novel, and several National Book Awards (given by the Manila Critics Circle and the National Book Development Board).

Dr. Hidalgo is one of the country’s most distinguished writers. She is a writer of fiction and nonfiction, a critic and a literary scholar, having published more than 40 books, including three novels, five short story collections, four books of literary criticism, and numerous nonfiction collections.

Her latest books are What I Wanted to Be When I Grew Up: Early Apprenticeship of a Writer (UP Press, 2021) and Collected Stories and Tales (USTPH, 2019). Another volume of memoirs is forthcoming.

== Novel: Recuerdo ==
Recuerdo is an epistolary novel which consists of messages sent through email. The messages are written by Amanda, a middle-aged widow, to her daughter Marisa, a university student. Amanda lives in Bangkok while Marisa is situated in Manila. Through these messages, Amanda manages to sort out her life and helps Marisa understand their family's past. Amanda often tells her own mother's (Isabel) stories in many of these letters.

This way of storytelling resulted to a "Dynasty in Cyberspace" against a backdrop that juxtaposes two entirely different cultures: the first being superstitious while the other sophisticated. The story aims in this way to provide readers a history with which to possibly relate to ---- as it discusses the complexity of life in a world where families share so much heritage and stories often unknown and untold.

Hidalgo espouses a particularly pragmatic stance on this particular novel. It is not rooted in realism nor does it have any attempt on realism ---- it is a romantic novel. Fellow writer Ophelia Dimalanta supports Hidalgo as she says in her review of "Recuerdo", that readers might have the tendency of commenting on "the contravening of some degree of verisimilitude in the narrating of the stories rendered through letters which come regularly and with such contrived continuity and incessantness." Clearly, Dimalanta's response is a way of reinforcing Hidalgo's claim of "Recuerdo" being a romantic novel.

== Novel: A Book of Dreams ==
A novel all about dreams and their respective dreamers. A novel in which the characters live in their own dreams, in particular, those of Angela's. But before readers mistakenly take this for a postmodern novel, the book's blurb adds, "But for all its affinity to the postmodern pastiche, its plot is the traditional one of the search... the quest."

== Works ==
=== Short fiction ===
- Ballad of a Lost Season, 1987;
- Tales for a Rainy Night, 1993;
- Where Only the Moon Rages, 1994;
- Catch a Falling Star, 1999
- Sky Blue After The Rain: Selected Stories and Tales, 2005

=== Novels ===
- Recuerdo, 1996;
- Book of Dreams, 2001

=== Essays / Creative Non-fiction ===
- Sojourns, 1984
- Five Years in a Forgotten Land: A Burmese Notebook, 1991
- I Remember...Travel Essays, 1992
- Skyscrapers, Celadon and Kimchi: A Korean Notebook, 1993;
- The Path of the Heart, 1994;
- Coming Home, 1998
- Passages: Travel Essays, 2007
- Looking for the Philippines, 2009
- Travels with Tania, 2009
- Six Sketches of Filipino Women Writers, 2011
- Stella and Other Friendly Ghosts,, 2012
- " The Thing with Feathers: My Book of Memories, 2017

=== Literary Criticism ===
- Woman Writing: Home and Exile in the Autobiographical Narratives of Filipino Women, 1994;
- A Gentle Subversion: Essays on Philippine Fiction, 1998
- Over a Cup of Ginger Tea: Conversations on the Narratives of Filipino Women Writers, 2006
- Fabulists and Chroniclers, 2008
- To Remember to Remember: Reflections on the Literary Memoirs of Filipino Women, 2015

=== Anthologies (as editor) ===
- Selections from Contemporary Philippine Literature in English, 1971
- Philippine Post-Colonial Studies, 1993 (coedited with Priscelina Patajo-Legasto)
- The Likhaan Book of Poetry and Fiction: 1995, 1996
- Shaking the Family Tree, 1998
- An Edith Tiempo Reader, 1999
- The Likhaan Book of Poetry and Fiction: 1997, 1999
- Pinay: Autobiographical Narratives by Women Writers, 1926-1998, 2000
- Why I Travel and Other Essays, 2000
- Sleepless in Manila: Essays on Insomnia by Insomniacs, 2003
- My Fair Maladies, 2005

=== Textbooks ===
- Creative Nonfiction: A Manual for Filipino Writers, 2003
- Creative Nonfiction: A Reader, 2003

=== Honors and awards ===
- Carlos Palanca Memorial Awards for Short Fiction, Essay and the Novel
- Philippine Graphic Awards for Fiction
- "Philippines Free Press Awards for Fiction". Archived from the original on 31 August 2004.
- Focus Awards for Fiction
- National Book Awards from The Manila Critics' Circle
- British Council Fellowship to Cambridge
- U.P. President's Award for Outstanding Publication
- U.P. Gawad Chancellor for Artist of the Year
- U.P. Gawad Chancellor for Outstanding Teacher (Professor Level)
- Ellen F. Fajardo Foundation Grant for Excellence in Teaching
- Outstanding Thomasian Writer Award
- U.P. Gawad Chancellor Hall of Fame Award
- U.P. System International Publication Awards
- Henry Lee Irwin Professorial Chair in Creative Writing, Ateneo de Manila University
