= Renato Corona =

Chief Justice of the Philippines from 2010 to 2012

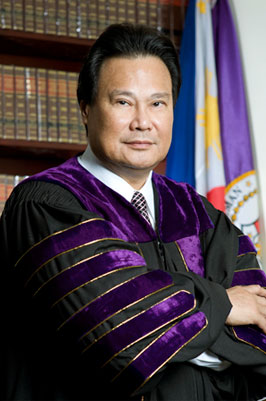
- Official portrait, 2012

23rd Chief Justice of the Supreme Court of the Philippines
- In office May 17, 2010 – May 29, 2012
- Appointed by: Gloria Macapagal Arroyo
- Preceded by: Reynato Puno
- Succeeded by: Maria Lourdes Sereno (De facto); Teresita de Castro (De jure)

Associate Justice of the Supreme Court of the Philippines
- In office April 9, 2002 – May 17, 2010
- Appointed by: Gloria Macapagal Arroyo
- Preceded by: Arturo Buena
- Succeeded by: Bienvenido L. Reyes (De jure)

Chief of Staff to the President
- In office January 20, 2001 – April 9, 2002
- President: Gloria Macapagal Arroyo
- Preceded by: Aprodicio Laquian
- Succeeded by: Rigoberto Tiglao

Personal details
- Born: Renato Tereso Antonio Coronado Corona; October 15, 1948 Santa Ana, Manila, Philippines
- Died: April 29, 2016 (aged 67) Pasig, Philippines
- Cause of death: Heart attack
- Resting place: Heritage Memorial Park, Taguig, Philippines
- Spouse: Cristina Roco
- Children: 3
- Education: Ateneo de Manila University (BA, LL.B, MBA); Harvard University (LL.M); University of Santo Tomas (DCL)
- Affiliation: Fraternal Order of Utopia

Renato Tereso Antonio Coronado Corona (October 15, 1948 – April 29, 2016) was a Filipino judge who served as the 23rd Chief Justice of the Philippines from 2010 until his removal from office in 2012.

Corona worked as a law professor and private practitioner before joining the cabinets of Presidents Fidel V. Ramos and Gloria Macapagal Arroyo. Arroyo appointed him Associate Justice of the Supreme Court in 2002, then Chief Justice in 2010 following the mandatory retirement of Reynato Puno.

During his tenure, the Supreme Court issued the landmark ruling in Hacienda Luisita, Inc. v. PARC (2011), which upheld the distribution of land to the hacienda's farm workers under the agrarian reform law and revoked the stock distribution option (SDO) agreement implemented in 1989.

In May 2012, Corona was impeached and convicted for failing to disclose his financial assets as required by the Constitution, making him the first Philippine government official to be removed from office through impeachment.

== Early life and education ==
Renato Tereso Antonio Coronado Corona was born on October 15, 1948, at the Lopez Clinic in Santa Ana, Manila to Juan M. Corona, a lawyer from Tanauan, Batangas, and Eugenia Ongcapin Coronado, a summa cum laude Bachelor of Science in Commerce (major in Accountancy) graduate of the University of Santo Tomas, from Santa Cruz, Manila. He graduated with gold medal honors from Ateneo de Manila Grade School in 1962 and from Ateneo de Manila High School in 1966.

Corona earned his Bachelor of Arts degree with honors from Ateneo de Manila University in 1970, where he also served as editor-in-chief of The Guidon, the university student newspaper. He completed his Bachelor of Laws at Ateneo Law School in 1974, placing 25th out of 1,965 candidates in the bar examination with a rating of 84.6 percent. After his law studies, he obtained a Master of Business Administration degree at the Ateneo Professional Schools.

In 1981, he was admitted to the Master of Laws program at Harvard Law School, where he specialized in foreign investment policies and the regulation of corporate and financial institutions. He earned his LL.M. degree in 1982. He later obtained his Doctor of Civil Law degree from the University of Santo Tomas, graduating summa cum laude and as class valedictorian.

== Chief Justice ==
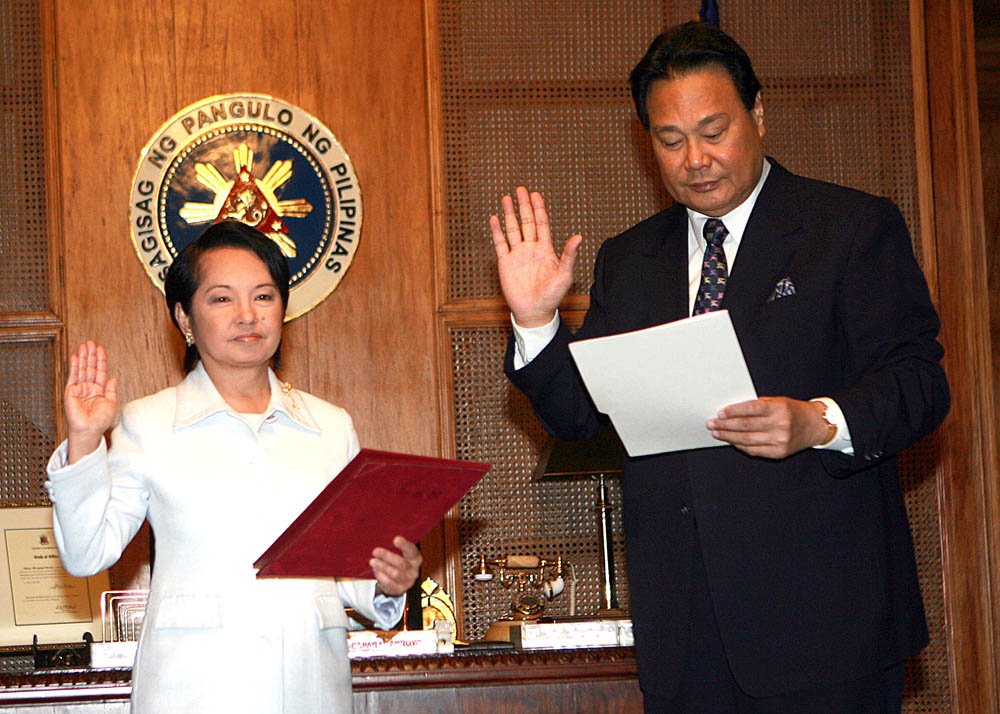
President Gloria Macapagal-Arroyo administered the oath of office to Renato C. Corona as Chief Justice of the Supreme Court of the Philippines at Malacañang Palace on May 17, 2010

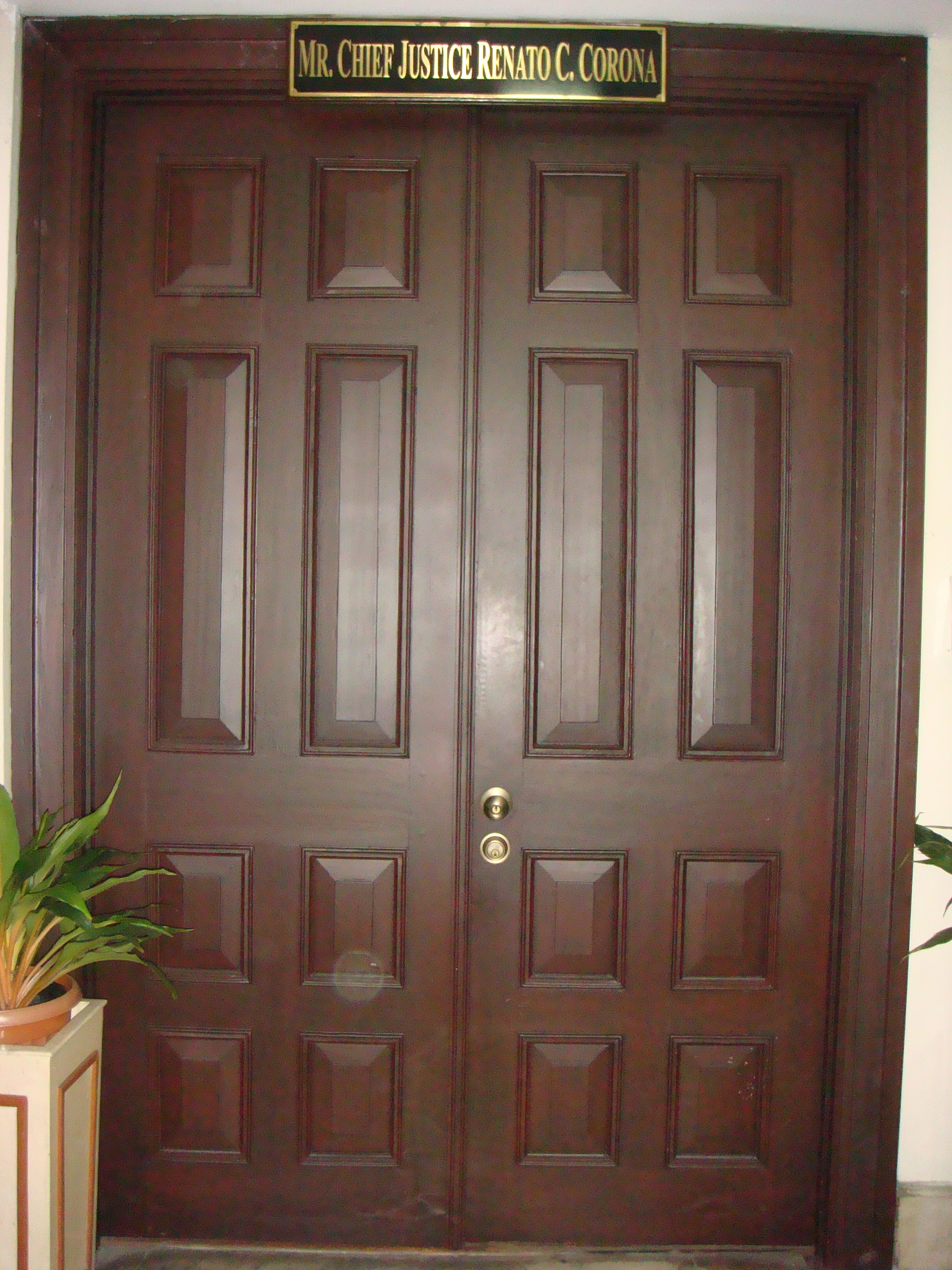
Chambers of Renato C. Corona in the Supreme Court of the Philippines building.

On May 12, 2010, two days after the general election and a month before the end of President Gloria Macapagal Arroyo's term, Corona was appointed as the 23rd Chief Justice of the Supreme Court of the Philippines, succeeding Reynato Puno, who had reached the mandatory retirement age.

His appointment was criticized by then president-elect Benigno Aquino III, who cited the constitutional prohibition on presidential appointments during the election period. The Supreme Court, however, ruled in March 2010 that the prohibition applied only to appointments in the executive branch.

=== Supreme Court ruling ===
The Supreme Court held that the election-period prohibition against presidential appointments did not apply to appointments to the Court. The ruling stated: "Had the framers intended to extend the prohibition contained in Section 15, Article VII to the appointment of members of the Supreme Court, they could have explicitly done so."

=== Hacienda Luisita, Inc. v. PARC ===
Hacienda Luisita is a 6,453-hectare sugar estate covering 11 barangays in Tarlac City and the municipalities of La Paz and Concepcion. It was part of the Central Azucarera de Tarlac owned by the Cojuangco family.

In 1988, President Corazon Aquino, a member of the Cojuangco family, signed Republic Act No. 6657, the Comprehensive Agrarian Reform Law, which allowed the distribution of shares of stock in lieu of land. This provision initiated the Comprehensive Agrarian Reform Program (CARP) and included a Stock Distribution Option (SDO). The Cojuangco family availed of this provision, with their company Tarlac Development Corporation (TADECO) forming Hacienda Luisita, Inc. (HLI).

In 1989, two referendums on the SDO were held. Several farm workers alleged that they were coerced into agreeing to the arrangement. Some 4,915 hectares were converted into shares, with TADECO holding 67 percent and the farm workers on the 1989 master list controlling 33 percent. In 2003, about 5,000 farm workers filed a supplemental petition seeking the revocation of the SDO and the distribution of land.

In November 2004, farm workers launched a strike over mass retrenchments and demands for higher pay. The protest was dispersed by the police on orders of then Labour Secretary Patricia Santo Tomás, resulting in the deaths of seven people and the arrest of 133 others. The incident came to be known as the Hacienda Luisita massacre.

In 2005, the Department of Agrarian Reform (DAR) recommended the revocation of the SDO. By December of that year, the Presidential Agrarian Reform Council (PARC) issued Resolution No. 2005-32-01, which revoked the SDO plan of TADECO/HLI and placed the lands under compulsory coverage of CARP.

On July 5, 2011, the Supreme Court, led by Chief Justice Corona, upheld the DAR and PARC rulings, revoking the 1989 SDO in lieu of land distribution under CARP. The Court, however, allowed farm workers to choose between a parcel of farmland or shares of stock.

In November 2011, in a unanimous en banc ruling, the Court ordered the distribution of the contested land to the original 6,296 farmer-beneficiaries, pursuant to the PARC's December 2005 resolution. The Court also lifted a temporary restraining order (TRO) that HLI had earlier secured.

=== Doctoral degree ===
On December 22, 2011, investigative journalist Marites Dañguilan Vitug of the online news site Rappler published an article alleging that the University of Santo Tomas (UST) "may have broken its rules" in granting Corona a doctorate in civil law and in conferring honours upon him. The UST Graduate School denied the claim, stating that Corona had completed and passed all the required subjects for the degree. It also questioned the objectivity of the article, citing Vitug's previous disagreements with Corona and the Court.

UST further stated that, as an autonomous higher education institution (HEI) under the Commission on Higher Education, it had the authority to set its own academic standards and determine to whom degrees may be conferred. The university added that questions regarding Corona's residency and academic honours were moot because of academic freedom.

== Impeachment ==
On December 12, 2011, 188 of the 285 members of the House of Representatives signed an impeachment complaint against Corona. As only one-third of the House membership, or 95 signatures, were required under the 1987 Constitution, the complaint was immediately transmitted to the Senate for trial.

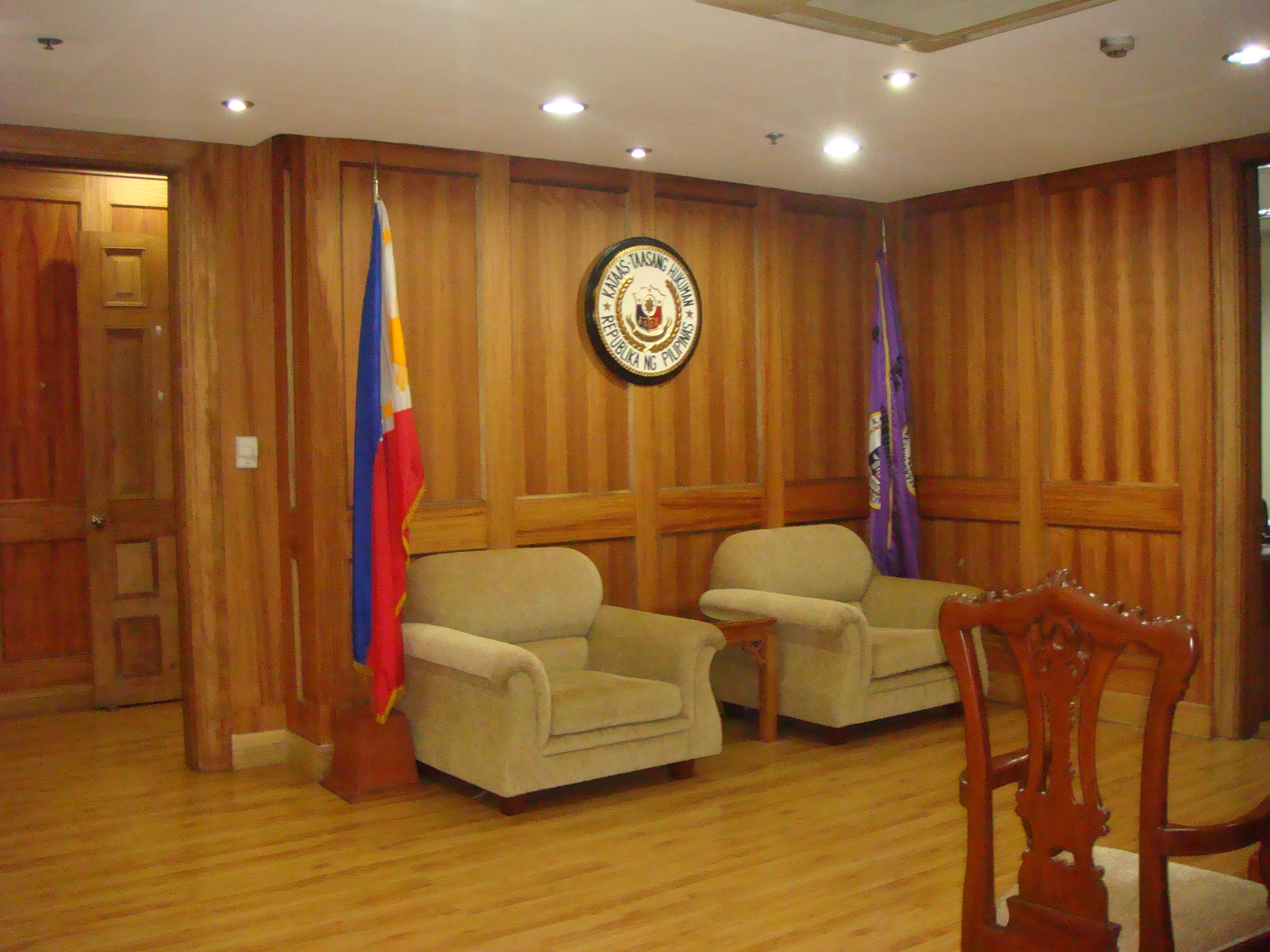
Corona's judicial chambers after the impeachment.

Corona described the case as politically motivated and part of then President Benigno Simeon Aquino III's alleged persecution of his perceived political opponents. In a speech during the blessing of the Justicia Room at the Ateneo Law School, he stated: "This whole sordid affair has all been about politics from beginning to end… It is about Hacienda Luisita: the ₱10 billion compensation which the President's family reportedly wants for the land that was simply lent to them by the government; the need to terrorize and instill a chilling effect on the justices of the Supreme Court to be able to bend their decisions in favour of the Malacañang tenant."

Corona noted that the Supreme Court heard oral arguments on the Hacienda Luisita case in August 2010, after he had become Chief Justice, and issued a ruling adverse to the Cojuangco–Aquino family in November 2011, a month before the impeachment complaint was filed.

In his defence, he argued that he was not required to disclose US$2.4 million in bank deposits, citing the secrecy of foreign currency accounts under the Foreign Currency Deposit Act (Republic Act No. 6426). He also maintained that his peso accounts were commingled funds.

Corona further pointed to incidents that, in his view, reflected Aquino's hostility towards him. In December 2011, Aquino publicly criticised him and the Court during the First National Criminal Justice Summit organised by the Department of Justice. The Supreme Court later issued a statement describing the remarks as "disturbing," noting that while disagreements between the executive and judiciary were not unusual, it was uncommon for the President to openly denounce the Court's independence in public and directly to its members. Aquino also criticised Corona at the 30th anniversary of the Makati Business Club, and in February 2012 at events in Aurora province commemorating its 33rd founding anniversary and the 124th birth anniversary of Doña Aurora Aragon-Quezon.

On May 29, 2012, the Senate, sitting as an impeachment court, found Corona guilty of Article II of the articles of impeachment for failing to disclose his statement of assets, liabilities, and net worth (SALN) as required by the Constitution. Twenty senators voted to convict, three voted to acquit. A two-thirds majority, or 16 votes, was required for conviction. Corona responded by saying that "ugly politics prevailed" but that his "conscience is clear." He thus became the first high-ranking Philippine official to be removed from office through impeachment.

=== Allegations of incentives and appeals to convict ===
On September 25, 2013, Senator Jinggoy Estrada, who had voted to convict, delivered a privilege speech claiming that ₱50 million had been released to each senator who voted for Corona's conviction. He later clarified that the amount was not a bribe but an "incentive" or "appeal." Several senators allied with Aquino confirmed that funds had been released, but denied any connection to the impeachment trial.

On January 20, 2014, Senator Bong Revilla alleged that Aquino and his allies had personally asked him to convict Corona. Revilla said that he was fetched by then Transportation Secretary Mar Roxas, a close ally of Aquino, and brought to Aquino's residence, where the President appealed for his vote. The President's spokesperson confirmed that Aquino had met with Revilla and other senators but denied that he instructed them to convict Corona. Malacañang declined to comment on the propriety of the meetings between the President and senator-judges.

== After the Supreme Court ==
In June 2016, the Sandiganbayan Third Division dismissed the pending criminal cases against Corona following his death.

On November 3, 2022, the Sandiganbayan dismissed the last case against Corona, his heirs, trustees, assignees, transferees, and successors-in-interest, ruling that they were able to "adequately prove that their income could enable them to acquire the questioned assets."

The court noted that "it remained undisputed that respondents both came from families of very comfortable means and that even before his appointment to the Supreme Court, CJ Corona had financial capabilities to shoulder huge expenses and had lived a very contented life with his family." It further stated that Corona was a successful lawyer whose "engagement with the private sectors appeared to have been lucrative as shown by the positions he held in the private banking and tax consulting institutions, as well as his position as Professor of Law at the Ateneo de Manila University School of Law."

The Sandiganbayan also observed that the prosecution's computations merely added Corona's earned income without considering his money market placements and substantial interest income accumulated over a ten-year period. The decision concluded: "For the future's worth, as stressed by the Supreme Court in In Re: Ma. Cristina Roco Corona, the SALN is a tool for public transparency and never a weapon for political vendetta."

On January 30, 2023, the Sandiganbayan ruling was declared final and executory.

== Personal life and death ==
Corona was married to Cristina Basa Roco. They had three children and six grandchildren.

He died on April 29, 2016, at 1:48 a.m. at The Medical City Ortigas, Pasig, due to complications from a heart attack. He was 67 years old. He had also been suffering from kidney disease and diabetes.

== Notable opinions ==
- Islamic Da'Wah Council v. Office of the Executive Secretary (2003) — on the authority of the national government to act as the exclusive body to issue halal certifications.
- Republic v. Sandiganbayan (2003) — on the forfeiture of the Swiss assets of the Marcos family.
- Francisco v. House of Rep. (2003) - Separate Opinion — on the impeachment resolution against Chief Justice Hilario Davide, Jr..
- Uy v. PHELA Trading (2005) — on the constitutional right to counsel.
- Taruc v. De la Cruz (2005) — on court jurisdiction over challenges to religious excommunication.
- Neypes v. Court of Appeals (2005) — on the period for appeal from trial court decisions.
- Lambino v. COMELEC (2006) - Dissenting Opinion — on the use of People's Initiative as a mode to amend the Constitution.

Political offices
Preceded by Aprodicio Laquian	Chief of Staff to the President; 2001–2002	Succeeded by Rigoberto Tiglao
Legal offices
Preceded by Arturo Buena	Associate Justice of the Supreme Court; 2002–2010	Succeeded by Bienvenido L. Reyes
Preceded by Reynato Puno	Chief Justice of the Supreme Court; 2010–2012	Succeeded by Teresita Leonardo-de Castro de jure
