= University of Santo Tomas Graduate School =

Graduate school of the University of Santo Tomas

- Established: 1938
- Dean: Prof. Michael Anthony C. Vasco, PhD
- Regent: Rev. Fr. Rodel E. Aligan, OP, S.Th.D.
- Location: Thomas Aquinas Research Complex, UST, Sampaloc, Manila, Philippines
- Patron saints: St. Antoninus of Florence | Blessed Iustus Takayama Ukon
- Colors: Gold, white and blue
- Website: graduateschool.ust.edu.ph

The University of Santo Tomas Graduate School is the graduate school of the University of Santo Tomas, the oldest and largest Catholic university in Manila, Philippines.

As early as the seventeenth (17th) century, the University of Santo Tomas (UST) had already been granting master's and doctoral degrees. The different faculties and colleges supervised their respective undergraduate, graduate and postgraduate programs

== General information ==
Academic programs have grown from a handful of academic offerings to around ninety graduate degree programs, spanning a cross-section of disciplines. Regular classes, colloquia and oral defenses are held at the Thomas Aquinas Research Complex. Laboratories and conference halls are maintained at the left wing of the Benavides Building. The UST Graduate School publishes The Antoninus Journal (formerly Ad Veritatem), a refereed multidisciplinary scholarly journal.

== Academic recognition ==
The UST Graduate School is recognized by the Commission on Higher Education of the Philippines as a Center of Excellence in several fields of the arts and humanities, allied health sciences, natural sciences, and engineering. Its programs in business management, public management, and education were also recognized by the Commission on Higher Education's Fund for Center of Excellence also and Assistance to Private Education (FAPE) in its periodic and systemic Evaluation of Graduate Education Programs (EGEP).

Six of its business-related degrees are also included in the 2011-2017 list of top international master's programs by the Paris-based Eduniversal International Scientific Committee. The following programs are ranked in the Far East Asian region, according to their respective categories: MA in communication (10th place); MA in economics (14th); MS in Human Relations Management (14th); Master of Public Administration (17th); MS in Management Engineering (39th); and MBA in Entrepreneurship program (99th).

The Graduate School has Level III accreditation status for its Master's programs granted by the Philippine Association of Colleges and Universities Commission on Accreditation (PACUCOA), maintains two Centers of Development (M.S./Ph.D. Psychology and M.A. Literature) and three Centers of Excellence (M.A./Ph.D. Philosophy, Master in Music and M.S./Ph.D. Chemistry) and has been recognized by EDUNIVERSAL as one of best Master's Programs worldwide.

== U.S.T. Academic Deans ==
- 1938-1941: Rev. Fr. Silvestre Sancho, O.P., S.Th.D.
- 1946-1951: Rev. Fr. Eugenio Jordan, O.P., Ph.LittD.
- 1952: Rev. Fr. Jesus Castañon, O.P., Litt.D.
- 1952: Rev. Fr. Antonio Gonzalez, O.P., Ph.D.
- 1953-1957: Rev. Fr. Angel de Blas, O.P., Ph.D.
- 1958-1960: Rev. Fr. José Cuesta, O.P., M.A.
- 1961-1964: Rev. Fr. Vidal Clemente, O.P., S.Th.D.
- 1965-1970: Rev. Fr. Alfredo Panizo, O.P., Ph.D.
- 1970-1974: Prof. Estela Llenado-Zamora, Ph.D.
- 1974-1976: Rev. Fr. Antonio Gonzalez, O.P., Ph.D.
- 1976-1982: Prof. Carmen Kanapi, Ph.D.
- 1982-1986: Rev. Fr. Paul Zwaenepoel, C.I.C.M., Ph.D.
- 1987-1995: Prof. Magdalena Villaba, Ph.D.
- 1995-1999: Rev. Fr. José Antonio E.
  Aureada, O.P.
- 2000-2013: Prof. Lilian J. Sison, Ph.D.
- 2013-2015: Prof. Marilu R. Madrunio, Ph.D.
- 2016–present: Prof. Michael Anthony C. Vasco, Ph.D.

== Notable alumni ==
The Graduate School has produced the following alumni:

=== Government ===
- Jose P. Laurel - President of the Second Philippine Republic
- Arturo Tolentino - former Vice President of the Philippines
- Diosdado Macapagal - former President of the Philippines
- Renato Corona - former Chief Justice of the Philippine Supreme Court
- Sotero Laurel - Senator of the Republic of the Philippines (1987–1992)
- Claro M. Recto - Senator of the Republic of the Philippines
- Maria Kalaw-Katigbak - Senator of the Republic of the Philippines (1961–67) Fifth Congress

=== Academe and professional practice ===
- Merlinda Bobis - Professor, Creative Writing Program, University of Wollongong in Australia; Winner: Australian Writers’ Guild Award, Ian Reed Radio Drama Prize, International Prix Italia, Steele Rudd Award for the Best Published Collection of Australian Short Stories, Judges’ Choice Award at the Bumbershoot Bookfair in the Seattle Arts Festival, UMPIL (Union of Writers in the Philippines) Awardee
- Rustica Carpio - professor, theatre and stage actress and internationally and locally awarded film actress.
- Cristina Pantoja-Hidalgo - Vice President for Public Affairs, University of the Philippines; former Dean, UP College of Arts and Letters; former executive director, UP Institute of Creative Writing; former director, UP Press
- William Henry Scott - Noted historian on Pre-Hispanic Philippines and Gran Cordilleria Central, Tanglaw ng Lahi Awardee
- Gregorio Zaide - professor and historian, a textbook author on Philippine and World histories, former mayor of Pagsanjan, Laguna.
- Paz Latorena - teacher and fictionist, who belongs to the first generation of Filipino writers in English. Her short story, "The Small Key" is a widely anthologized literary work.
