= Ponciano B. P. Pineda =

Ponciano B. Peralta Pineda is a Filipino writer, teacher, linguist and lawyer. Ponciano Pineda is considered as the "Father of the Commission on Filipino Language" for his promotion to establish a commission based on Section 9 of our Philippine Constitution.

He became director of Commission on the Filipino Language (Filipino: Komisyon sa Wikang Filipino) formerly Surian ng Wikang Pambansa during the year 1971 to 1999. Under his leadership, Pineda started socio-linguistic research to further widen the Filipino Language. Also one of this is about the orthographic reform in the Filipino Language. Under Pineda one major change is on language policy: a bilingual education in the year 1974; Filipino as national and primary language of Filipinos in 1983 and the Filipino alphabet comprising 28 letters in 1987. He established 12 regional centers of the Filipino language throughout the Philippines.

The Philippine Dictionary (1973) by Jose Villa Panganiban and the Centennial Dictionary;; of the Commission on the Filipino Language (1998) was edited by Ponciano B. Pineda. He published the Dictionary for Filipino language, which served as the foundation of national lexicography.

With the help of former secretary of the Department of Filipino, Angelica Panganiban, Pineda finished his studies at the University of Santo Tomas in 1948 in the course of Associate in Arts. Furthermore, he also became the director of The Varsitarian.

Besides being the author of academic books, Pineda is also a filipinologist or an expert in Filipino culture. Among his literary works are “Pagpupulong: Mga Tuntunin At Pamamaraan,” “Pandalubhasaang Sining Ng Komunikasyon” and “Sining Ng Komunikasyon Para Sa Mataas Na Paaralan.” The Gawad Palanca awarded him the first and second prize for his short stories “Ang Mangingisda” (1958) and “Malalim ang Gabi” (1953) respectively.
