= Teatro Tomasino =

Arts center in Metro Manila, Philippines

- Founded: 1977
- Type: Theatrical productions
- Location: Tan Yan Kee Student Center Albert Drive, Manila, Philippines
- Affiliations: University of Santo Tomas; Philippine Educational Theater Association
- Website: Teatro Tomasino Official Website

Teatro Tomasino is the official theater guild of the University of Santo Tomas in Manila, Philippines.

== History ==
The group was formed by 25 students under the supervisions of Professor Myrna Hilario and Professor Piedad Guinto on September 17, 1977.

Formal workshops started on April 2, 1977 under Maryo J. de los Reyes, Soxie Topacio, Jonee Gamboa, Nicanor Agudo, Sonia Roco, Adul de Leon, Sol Oca, Pilar de Gurman, Bernardo Bernardo and Lino Brocka. Subsequently, the first production was held with the performance of Orlando Nadres' Ang Awit na Hindi Matapos-tapos under the direction of Maryo J. de los Reyes.

Most of its productions are held at the Albertus Magnus Auditorium at the University of Santo Tomas.

== Select Production ==
Details
Year	Title	Venue
2020	Kung Paano Maghiwalay	Online
2016	Hindi na Muli	Tan Yan Kee Student Center

== Alumni ==
- John Lapus
- Piolo Pascual
- Wenn Deramas
- Arnold Clavio

== Awards and Citations ==
- CCP Theater Venue Grantee (1990)
- Most Unique Performance by a Group Delegate - ASEAN Arts Festival in Kuala Lumpur, Malaysia (1994)
- World Youth Day Performance (1995)
- Pope Leo XIII Award (1991–1995)
- Outstanding Service Award (2011 - 2012)
