= History of the University of Santo Tomas =

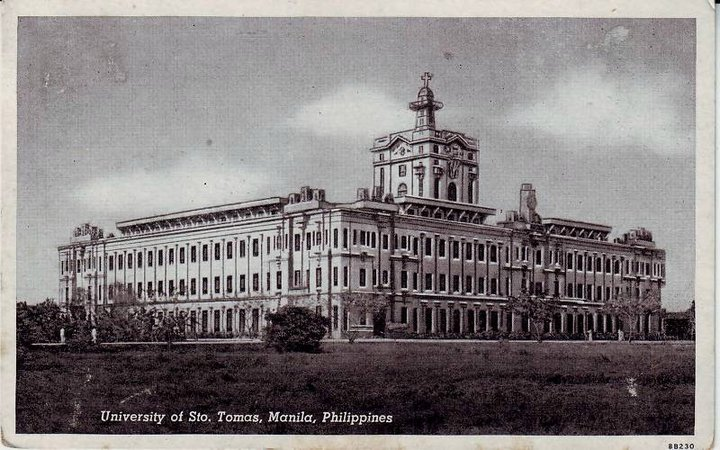
The UST Main Building during its early years (1920s-1930s).

The University of Santo Tomas is one of the oldest existing universities and holds the oldest extant university charter in the Philippines and in Asia. It was founded on April 28, 1611, by the third Archbishop of Manila, Miguel de Benavides, together with Domingo de Nieva and Bernardo de Santa Catalina. It was originally conceived as a school to prepare young men for the priesthood. Located Intramuros, it was first called Colegio de Nuestra Señora del Santísimo Rosario and later renamed Colegio de Santo Tomás in memory of Dominican theologian Saint Thomas Aquinas. In 1624, the colegio was authorized to confer academic degrees in theology, philosophy, and arts. On November 20, 1645, after representations by Vittorio Riccio, Pope Innocent X elevated the college to the rank of a university and in 1680 it was placed under royal patronage.

Through the centuries, the university was given the following titles: Royal, Pontifical, and Catholic University of the Philippines. In 1785, for the loyalty shown by the administration and students who volunteered to defend Manila against the British invasion, King Charles III of Spain granted it the title of "Royal University". Pope Leo XIII made the University of Santo Tomas a "Pontifical University" in 1902 and in 1947, Pope Pius XII bestowed upon it the title of "The Catholic University of the Philippines". Thus its complete name is Pontifical and Royal University of Santo Tomas, Manila.

In 1927, with the continuing increase in enrollment, the university moved from Intramuros to its present site which covers an area of 21.5 hectares in the district of Sampaloc, Manila. Since its foundation, the university's academic life has been interrupted only twice: 1898 to 1899, during the Philippine revolution against Spain; and 1942 to 1945, during the Japanese occupation of Manila, when the campus was transformed by the Japanese military into an internment camp.

== Founder ==
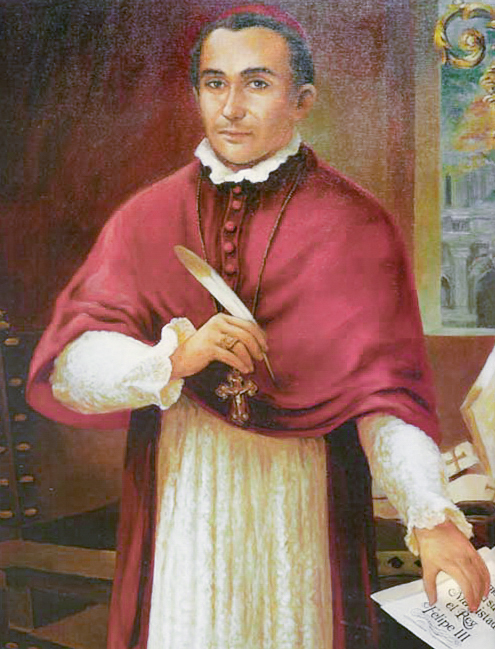
Miguel de Benavides, founder of the university

Although a few Dominican missionaries worked together to establish the university – including Miguel de Benavides, Bernardo Navarro, and other old professors from the higher colleges and universities in Spain – the founding of the university is attributed mainly to Miguel de Benavides, the first to give a fund for the maintenance of the institution.

Miguel de Benavides was born in 1550 in the Castilian town of Carrión de los Condes, province of Palencia, Spain, in the heart of the austere, grain-producing Tierra de Campos. Benavides was steeped in the theological principles of Francisco de Vitoria and Bartolomé de las Casas, who exchanged the prestigious professorial chair for remote and difficult new missions of the Philippines. He was chosen to govern the newly created Diocese of Nueva Segovia (now Vigan) as its First Bishop (1595–1601). He wrote the Doctrina Christiana in Chinese, the first book printed in the Philippines.

Later, he was promoted to be the third Archbishop of Manila (1602–1605). On July 26, 1605, Benavides died.

In an appearance before King Philip II, he obtained a royal decree ordering the holding a referendum in the Philippines towards political self-determination. It took place in 1599. The people chose to be under the sovereignty and protection of the monarch. This event was the only plebiscite known in the entire colonial history before the 20th century.

=== Benavides monument ===
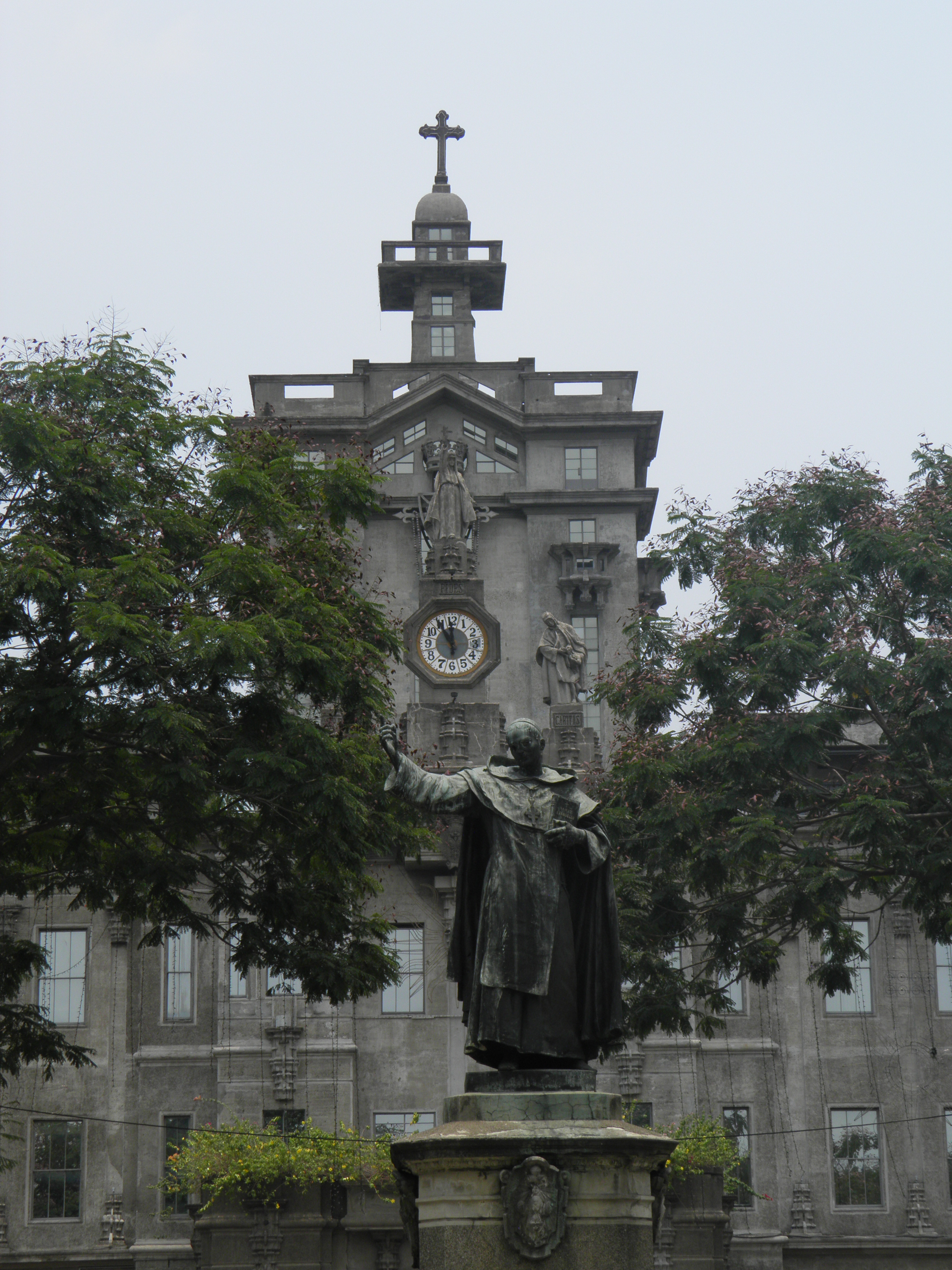
The Benavides Monument with the Main Building in the background.

In December 1878, the rector conceived the idea of erecting a monument with a statue of the founder in the Plaza de Santo Tomás in Intramuros. The Benavides statue was made in Paris in 1889 through funds collected by the faculty, students, and friends of the university. It was inaugurated on July 2, 1891 – opening of the school year. The statue is a bronze figure of Benavides on a pedestal facing the old campus in Intramuros. The base of the statue has the name of the sculptor and year of the make: Tony Noël, 1889. The pedestal was decorated with the seals of the Dominican Order and the university, as well as plaques on which were written the history of UST and a brief biography of the archbishop.

The statue was blown from its place by an artillery shell during the 1945 Battle of Manila, completely obliterating its marble pedestal. It was re-erected on November 13, 1946, inside the UST campus in Sampaloc, Manila.

The present bronze statue of Benavides is in front of the Main Building of the Sampaloc campus, rising on top of a granite pedestal flanked by four lions each bearing the coat of arms of Philippines, Spain, Holy See, and the Dominican Order. He dons the rugged habit of the pioneer Dominican missionaries. His right hand is elevated in the preaching fashion, his index finger pointing to the heavens. His left hand rests on his chest holding a book bearing the words Santo Evangélico on its cover. A skull cap covers his head, and a pectoral cross hangs from his neck, the symbols of Episcopal dignity.

== Establishment ==
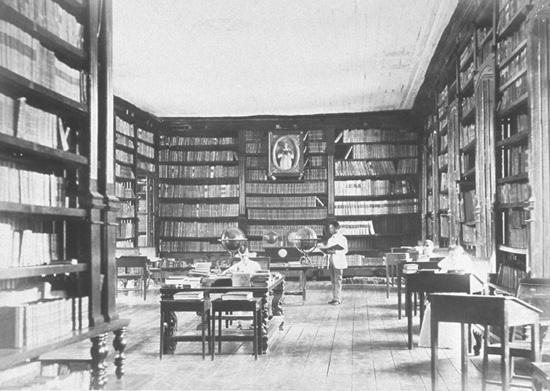
The old University library in Intramuros consisted of Benavides' collection of books related to philosophy, theology, and law.

The university seems to have originated from the Dominican Conventual School of Santo Domingo (known often by the name of Our Lady of the Holy Rosary) with which it carried a common existence until 1611. The Dominican Order arrived in 1587. A program was held to solemnize the feast of St. Dominic, an old university student at Palencia and the founder of Order of Preachers. The celebration was held in the main hall of the cathedral in the presence of prominent dignitaries of all religious orders and of the civil authorities. The academic act was directed by a professor of theology, Pedro de Soto.

From that moment Domingo de Salazar – first Bishop of the Philippines – was inspired to find a college-university similar to those in Mexico, where religious and lay persons might pursue college studies; and to begin with, a "School of Grammar" was established in addition to the Escuela de Tiples. At that same time, it was determined that Miguel de Benavides and Miguel de Santamaria gave conferences in the Episcopal Palace in the cathedral, and in the Convent-School of Santo Domingo.

Name changes
- 1611: Colegio de Nuestra Señora del Santísimo Rosario
- 1616: Colegio de Santo Tomás de Nuestra Señora del Santísimo Rosario
- 1617: Colegio de Santo Tomás de Manila
- 1619: Colegio de Santo Tomás de Aquino
- 1645: Universidad de Santo Tomás
- 1785: Given the title of "Real" (Spanish for "Royal")
- 1870: Universidad de Filipinas
- 1877: Universidad de Santo Tomas
- 1902: Given the title of "Pontifical"
- 1947: Given the title of "Catholic University of the Philippines"
- Present: Pontifical and Royal University of Santo Tomas, Manila

In his will dated July 26, 1605, feast of St. Anne, Miguel de Benavides made provision for the foundation of the institution by bequeathing his library and goods valued at ₱1,500 which served as the nucleus of funds for the establishment of an institution of higher learning. This was increased to ₱7,140 by donations made by Pablo Rodríguez, Andrés Hermosa, and Juan Morales. After Benavides' death, in the same year, his confreres carried on – albeit with small funds – in order to realize his idea. As Fr. Sánchez wrote in his book, "Few Institutions have begun their lives in this world with such scanty material means as did our University."

In 1609, permission to open the college was requested from King Philip III, which only reached Manila in 1611. On April 28, 1611, the document of the foundation was signed by Baltasar Fort, Provincial of the Dominican Province of the Holy Rosary; Francisco Minayo, Prior of the Santo Domingo Convent; and Bernardo de Santa Catalina, Commissary-General of the Holy Office of the Philippines, which thus converted into university thirty-four years later. Notary Juan Illian witnessed the signing of the act of foundation.

It was Bernardo de Santa Catalina who executed the document of foundation stating that "the residue of his (Benavides') legacy should be applied to the founding and endowing of a college. He carried out Benavides's wishes and was able to secure a building near the Dominican church and convent in Intramuros for the College.

The historians of the university affirmed that it was "the outgrowth of the early educational labors inaugurated by the Dominican Order shortly after the arrival (in this country) of its first missionaries in 1587."

== Early years ==
The institution started its operation with courses in theology, arts, and philosophy as the College of Our Lady of the Most Holy Rosary (Spanish: Colegio de Nuestra Señora del Santísimo Rosario). In 1617, the college was renamed as College of Santo Tomas (Spanish: Colegio de Santo Tomás) after the Dominican theologian St. Thomas Aquinas (1225–1274).

Prior to the act of foundation, King Philip III granted, through the Governor-General, the permission to open a college in Manila. So in 1612, Domingo González, lector of the Santo Domingo Convent, was appointed to work on the completion the organization of the college. In that same year, when classes also began, the Dominican Province of the Holy Rosary accepted the college, an act which amounted to the Dominican Order's assuming the responsibility in the operation of the institution. In 1619, in the name of King Philip IV, the Governor-General of the Philippines, gave his approval. The Holy See granted, although indirectly or implicitly, recognition to the new college in 1619. In 1627, Pope Urban VIII also authorized the college to confer academic degrees, so that the said academic degrees had both royal and papal approval. Although the college had only been in operation for a few years, records show that degrees were already being conferred in 1640.

Upon petition of King Philip IV, Pope Innocent X converted the college into a university on November 20, 1645, in his brief, In Supreminenti, thus conferring upon it the status of university under the patronage of the Holy See. UST was later recognized as a "university for life" by the Real Audencia of Spain. Then on May 12, 1680, King Charles II of Spain extended royal patronage to the university. It was also that year in 1645 that the Master General of the Dominican Order, acting under the authority granted by the Roman Pontiff, assumed the authority to appoint its rector and with to "have charge of the healthy and happy direction of the university". It was thus a confirmation of the fact that the rector of the university became the highest administrator of the university, with the implementation of the different curricula, methods of instruction, and the adoption of "laudable customs of other universities". The course in Canon Law was started in 1732.

=== Campus in Intramuros ===
The Puerta del Colegio of the Intramuros campus facing the Miguel de Benavides Monument.

The first campus stood in the walled city of Intramuros opposite the old Santo Domingo Church. It is the site that was bounded on the northwest by Aduana (renamed Andres Soriano) Street, on the northeast by Solana Street and Plaza España, on the southeast by Santo Tomás Street and Plaza Santo Tomás, and on the southwest by the Ayuntamiento de Manila. The edifice had a lower and upper floor and area of 6,239.6 square metres (67,162 sq ft).

The oldest discovered floor plan of the campus was made by the Dominican priest Juan Peguero, who was the Procurator of the Dominican Province from 1675 to 1677 and from 1680 to 1684. The plan showed two quadrangles which were properties acquired throughout the 17th century. The upper quadrangle served as a graveyard before it became a plaza where the original monument of Benavides stood in 1891. The lower quadrant marked the main campus site. It also mentioned Puerta del Colegio or the main entrance to the campus, which would later become the Arch of the Centuries.

Maps of the university in the 1870s included the Paraninfo (assembly hall), Biblioteca (library), Gabinete de Fisica, and the Museum of National History. Several attempts were made to expand the campus within Intramuros. In 1896, the university purchased the lot across the main campus from Aduana Street. The planned expansion did not push through because of the outbreak of the Philippine Revolution. There was also a plan to renovate a three-floor property along Muralla Street, probably close to the Colegio de San Juan de Letran, in the first half of the 20th century. The Paraninfo, the Museum of Natural History, and the UST Press transferred to the Sampaloc campus in 1927, 1939, and 1940, respectively.

At the end of Battle of Manila in 1945, the campus had been reduced to ruins. The vacated lot was eventually sold on December 6, 1949 to the Phil-Am Life Insurance Co., with the BF Homes Condominium currently occupying its site.

=== First graduates ===
The colegio graduates during the early years were few because there were a small number of students who enrolled. There were 12 interns during the establishment of the colegio in 1619. The enrollment record during the first 30 years of the colegio was not preserved. The earliest graduation records called Libro de Asiento de Grados de la Universidad de Santo Tomas date back only from 1663.

The Informacion Juridica of 1631 mentioned three names who were graduates of 1629: Diego de Sanabria, a doctor in theology; and Juan Fernandez and Sebastian Ramos, both masters of arts. Diego de Sanabria, who became a Jesuit parish priest of the Spanish community in Manila, was considered the first graduate and was honored with the title el primer parto (colegio's first born).

== Eighteenth century ==
=== Title of Royal University ===
Philip IV had granted his Royal approval on November 27, 1623. Official royal patronage was accorded to the university on May 12, 1680, by King Charles II of Spain.

However, the title Real was only bestowed by King Charles III on May 20, 1785, during the term of rector Domingo Collantes. The title "Real" was given to the UST in recognition of its loyalty to the Spanish crown after the university volunteered its students for the military defense of Manila during the recurrence of war between the allied countries of France, Spain against England.

== Nineteenth century ==
The 1865 decree for the revamp of secondary education brought about major developments for UST. It was tasked as a Bureau of Education with the rector as its director. This meant that UST was to handle all matters pertaining to secondary education from the appointment of the school professors; the submission of grades, and the signing of the awarding of diplomas to the bachelor of arts graduates.

In 1870 Segismundo Moret, the Minister of colonies, issued two decrees that totally reorganized the Philippine education system. The first decree abolished all secondary schools and placed them under a single "Instituto Filipino". The second decree converted the University of Santo Tomás, being the only official institution of higher learning in the islands, into a Universidad de Filipinas, thus the name Royal and Pontifical University of the Philippines.

The fall of the Spanish liberal government (which led to Moret's removal) and the monarchical restoration abolished these decrees. The university was handed back to the Dominicans. It was only in 1877 that Spain recognized the university again as an institution administered by the religious.

The university closed its doors during the Philippine Revolution of 1896 because of the ensuing disorder. It reopened though for the school year 1897–1898 when the rebels retreated to the provinces. The arrival of the Spanish–American War to the Philippines and the resumption of the Revolution in 1898 led again to the suspension of classes. UST closed for the school year 1898–1899.

=== José Rizal ===
José Rizal entered the university in 1877. He enrolled in the pre-law course, which was made up of philosophical subjects. The course was called metaphysics. He passed the course with the highest grades.

He later chose to enter a career in medicine. And in 1878–1879, he took simultaneously the pre-medicine course and the first year of Medicine. It was against the rules, but Rizal was favored with a dispensation which few received. The pre-medicine course was called Curso de Ampliación, because the student, having taken already physics, chemistry, and natural history in high school, now took an advanced course on the same subjects. Rizal did not take in Santo Tomas "class of physics" he described in El Filibusterismo, but the course of Ampliación.

While studying medicine, Rizal remained above average, although his grades were not as high as those that he received in classes in the arts and letters. This continued even in his later studies in Madrid. Rizal was not recorded to have ever complained about his grades in the university, while he did complain about those he received in Madrid.

In the fourth and last year in the university, only seven students remained, and Rizal was one of them. And he ended that year in second place.

== Twentieth century ==
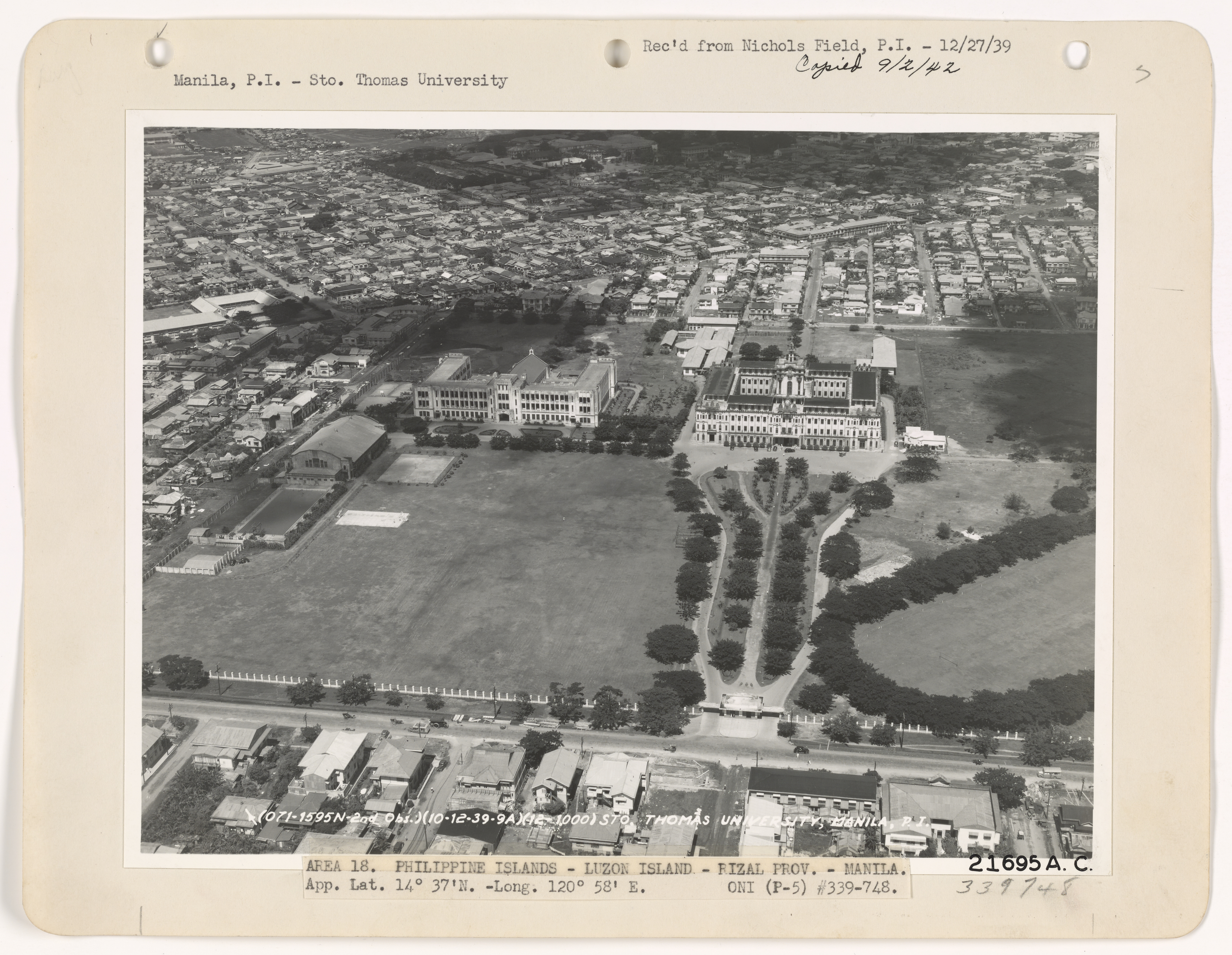
Aerial view of the university, 1939

Following the Philippine revolution, Spanish members of the Dominican Order were removed from their parishes and left the Philippines in 1899, eventually turning over some of their churches and mission stations to secular clergy, while retaining other parishes and foundations, with American friars taking over them.

In compliance with the requirements of Act No. 1459 also known as the Corporation Law of 1906, the university was incorporated. The application contained the following statements: That the name of the corporation is and will be known as the "Royal and Pontifical University of Santo Tomas" and abbreviated as "University of Santo Tomas", "that the corporation is located in Manila with its main office at 139 Calle de Sto. Tomas, Intramuros"

At the beginning of the 20th century, a 21.5-hectare (53-acre) plot of land in the Sulucan Hills of Sampaloc, Manila was donated by Francesca Bustamante Bayot to the Dominicans for the university's expansion outside Intramuros. In 1927, Main Building, the first earthquake-proof building in the Philippines, was then inaugurated at the Sulucan site. With the majority of the departments and courses moved to the new location, only the Faculty of Medicine and Surgery and the Civil Law department remained in the original Intramuros site.

For the first time in the history of UST, the Faculty of Pharmacy opened its doors to women in the academic year 1924–1925. It was one of the first universities in the Philippines to become co-educational when it admitted women. There were 24 women enrollees out of the 93 who matriculated for the said Faculty that school year. The university, however, had been granting certificates through the School of Midwifery since 1879. Permission was given to the College of Education in 1926, to Faculty of Philosophy and Letters in 1927 followed by the Faculty of Medicine and Surgery and College of Commerce in 1932. The admission of women no longer became an issue in later years. Only the Faculties of Sacred Theology, Canon Law, and Philosophy remained exclusively for men.

In 1925, it became one of the first universities in the Philippines to require the use of English as a medium of instruction, to replace Spanish. When it was appropriate to Filipinize the administration, Leonardo Z. Legazpi became the first Filipino Rector of UST on October 9, 1971.

Since its establishment in 1611, the university's academic life was interrupted only twice: from 1898 to 1899, during the Philippine Revolution against Spain, and from 1942 to 1945, during the Japanese occupation of the country. In its long history, the university has been under the leadership of more than 90 Rectors. UST's first Filipino rector was Leonardo Legaspi who served UST from 1971 to 1977. In recognition of its achievements, a number of important dignitaries have officially visited the university, among them, during the last three decades: Pope Paul VI on November 28, 1970; King Juan Carlos I of Spain in 1974 and 1995; Mother Teresa of Calcutta in January 1977 and again in November 1984; Pope John Paul II on February 18, 1981, and January 13, 1995 (as part of the World Youth Day 1995).

=== Title of Pontifical University ===
On September 17, 1902, in his constitution, Quae Mari Sinico, Pope Leo XIII bestowed upon the university the title of Pontifical University.

This title may be considered a reiteration of the honor and protection previously granted when, in 1619, the Holy See had already issued the brief "Charissimi in Christo", which enabled students who had studied in the Dominican Colleges of the Indies for five years to receive degrees, in 1629 and 1639 by Pope Urban VIII, and in 1645, when Pope Innocent X converted the College of Santo Tomas into a university.

UST is Asia's only remaining Pontifical university. Annuario Pontificio, the annual official directory of the Holy See, in its edition for the year 2000, lists all the Catholic and or Pontifical institutes of higher learning, grouping them into two categories: Roman Ateneums and Catholic Universities. Only 24 are called Pontifical, and of these 24, six are located in Rome (Gregorian University, Lateran University, Urbanian University, University of Santo Tomas (known as The Angelicum), Salisian University and Holy Cross University); three are in Europe; fourteen in Latin America; and one in Asia, this one being the University of Santo Tomas of Manila. The oldest university to be denominated by the Holy See as Pontifical is the Jesuit Gregorian University in Rome. Although founded in 1551, it was Pope Pius IX who, in 1873, permitted the school to assume the title of "Pontifical University". All the other abovementioned 23 universities received the title of Pontifical in the 20th century. The University of Santo Tomas of Manila, the oldest of them, is second only to the Gregorian University to be declared Pontifical by the apostolic constitution Quae Mari Sinico in 1902.

=== Tricentennial celebration ===
For five days, on December 16–20, 1911, the university celebrated its 300th anniversary. The main events of the celebration included a solemn high mass in honor of Miguel de Benavides, the unveiling of the commemorative plaque for the festivities, the unveiling of a plaque placed at the pedestal of the statue of Benavides in Intramuros, the laying of the foundation stone for the future building at university in Sampaloc, Manila, and a big banquet. Around 300 guests, both civil and ecclesiastical authorities, professors, and alumni of the university attended the banquet at the Colegio de San Juan de Letran. The solemn investiture of the latest graduates of the university was held in the old Santo Domingo Church. Pope Pius X and members of the Philippine hierarchy sent congratulatory messages to the university.

=== World War II ===
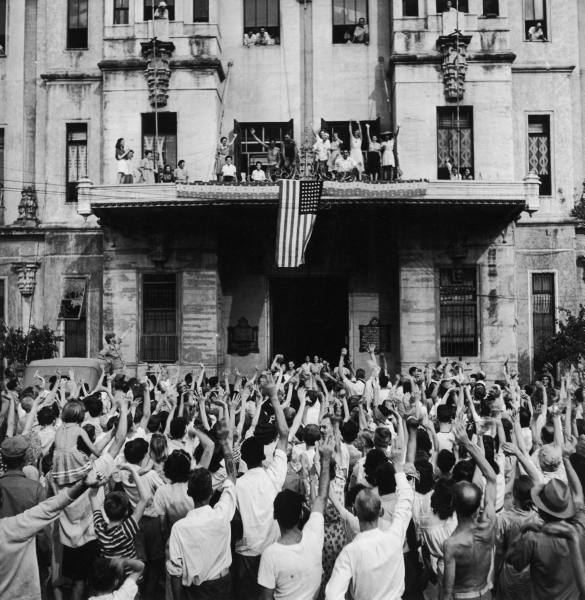
Santo Tomas Internment Camp during the Liberation from the Japanese regime in February 1945

During World War II, the Japanese converted the campus into an internment camp for civilians, foreigners and POWs. War crimes against American soldiers (Filipino soldiers were granted amnesty) and civilians living abroad occurred in UST.

On the evening of January 2, soon after the Japanese forces entered Manila, as well as on January 3, many Americans and other Allied citizens were taken to the university camp. The camp population totaled 3,259 of which 2,200 were American, 74 British, 920 Dutch, 28 Polish, 36 Mexicans and 1 Nicaraguan.

All the buildings of the university except the seminary building, the printing press and two first floors of Main Building were occupied. The war internees occupied three floors of the Main Building, the entire Education Building (presently UST Hospital), the Domestic Science building, and the School of Mines building. Communication between them and the outside world was prevented by the Japanese as much as possible.

Outside fences in España Boulevard were completely covered with tall sawali (woven bamboo matting), while the concrete walls on all other sides of the campus remained high, preventing view between the internees and the outside world.

The university authorities cooperated with the internees and the Japanese officials. They were given several duties by the Japanese, which they performed. Dominican priests were still allowed to direct the use of disposition of the university buildings, equipment, and power plant, although subject to the final approval or disapproval of the Japanese authorities.

During the liberation of Manila, the buildings of the campus in Intramuros, as well as in Sampaloc were damaged or destroyed. The facilities in Intramuros were burned by the Kenpeitai on February 8, 1944. As for those in Sampaloc, though they were not destroyed, some portions were slightly damaged during the shellings, including the rooms on the West of the Main Building, some rooms of the Education building, and the university gymnasium.

There were about 335 casualties among the internees, 35 died and 300 were wounded. Some were buried in a vacant lot outside the Forbes gate, and others were buried inside the campus.

The UST administration was fortunate to have been able to transfer the UST printing press, the first printing press in the country, from Intramuros to the Sampalox campus in the nick of time in 1940, a year before the Pearl Harbor bombing.

=== Title of Catholic University of the Philippines ===
On April 30, 1947, Pope Pius XII, through the decree Sacrae Congregationis de Seminariis et Studiorum Universitatibus, bestowed upon it the title of "The Catholic University of the Philippines". In terms of the student population, UST the largest catholic University in the world located in one campus.

=== Semiseptcentennial celebration ===
Pope John XXIII sent a warm personal letter to the university. He called the university Christianae Sapientiae emicantissimum or the "most resplendent light of Christian Wisdom" in the seven-page communication dispatched to Manila from the Vatican through the Apostolic Nuncio. Through the rector magnificus, the pope extended his felicitations on the university's golden jubilee and maternal blessings for continued growth, prosperity, and peace. He also congratulated the university for being "a very valid bulwark of Christian civilization". Throughout 1961, the university celebrated its 350th year. The principal festivities such as the alumni banquet and the Gala Concert were held on March 4–7, 1961.

=== Filipinization of the university ===
Filipino rectors
Name	Years of rectorship
Leonard Legaspi	1971–1977
Norberto Castillo	1982–1990
Rolando de la Rosa	1990–1998
Tamerlane R. Lana	1998–2006
Ernesto M. Arceo	2006–2007
Rolando de la Rosa	2008–2012
Herminio Dagohoy	2012–2020
Richard Ang	2020–present

The Filipinization movement of the Spaniard-dominated Dominican Order in the Philippines began in 1951. Filipino Dominicans sought key positions in UST while students organized demonstrations and demanded the ouster of Spanish Dominicans.

Filipinization of UST reached its culmination when Leonard Legaspi became the first Filipino rector of the university in 1971. However, Legaspi was criticized for the supposedly slow process of appointing Filipino Dominicans to administrative positions. Under his rectorship, he implemented the translation of the heading of all diplomas to Filipino.

Filipino Dominicans in the university campaigned for the Filipinization not only of UST but also of the entire Philippines. It was fulfilled when the Dominican Province of the Philippines was established on December 8, 1971, with Fr. Rogelio Alarcon as its first prior provincial.

== Modern history ==
As of 2013 UST had a total enrollment of approximately 45,000 students, 33,000 undergraduates and 5,000 students in medicine, Law, and the Graduate School. The university admits about 8,500 new students out of 50,000 applicants per year.

After 400 years, the university has five clusters of discipline: Science and Technology; Arts and the Humanities; Education and the Social Sciences; Medicine and Health, and the Ecclesiastical Faculties – spread over 21 faculties, colleges, and institutes.

=== Quadricentennial celebration ===
The agenda ahead of the university's quadricentennial in 2011 includes the introduction of new academic programs, improvements in the university's infrastructure, and other projects to raise UST's national and international prominence and promote its role as a social catalyst.

Plans to open satellite campuses in Santa Rosa, Laguna and another in General Santos City are being put in place.

Physical developments for the Sampaloc campus are ongoing. The Plaza Mayor in front the Main Building, together with the Quadricentennial Square which will feature the Tetraglobal sculpture, the Quadricentennial Fountain, and the Quadricentennial Alumni Walkway were constructed in 2006. To accommodate the needs of extra space for the growing number of student activities, the UST Tan Yan Kee Student Center was built in front of the Miguel de Benavides Library. The more-than-80-year-old Main Building, and the artifacts and art works in the UST Museum of Arts and Sciences were recently placed under the preservation of the UST Heritage Conservation program in December 2008.

The UST Benavides Cancer Institute, part of the five-year redevelopment plan and expansion of the UST Hospital for its 60-year celebration and the quadricentennial celebration, was also established in the year 2006.

Part of the university's infrastructure modernization is the construction of the P800-million, state-of-the-art, four-storey gymnasium capable of seating 5,792, designed by Thomasian architects José Pedro Recio and Carmelo T. Casas. The construction has been completed in time for the Quadricentennial Celebration of the university. This is through the leadership of the Rolando de la Rosa. Another project is the Thomasian Alumni Center, a 10-storey building that will be a symbol of the outstanding achievements of Thomasian alumni all over the world. Part of the construction cost has been donated by alumni, notably the UST Medical Alumni in America.

The UST Publishing House in 2001 launched its quadricentennial project, "400 Books at 400!". From theology to literature to medicine-related disciplines written in both Filipino and English, the Publishing house is more than half way in completing its race.

=== Student repression and censorship ===
The 2018 UST student handbook prohibited students from joining or forming "unrecognized organizations" with "illegal or immoral purpose" and "organizing unauthorized student activity". This led to incidents where students were suspended or expelled for forming or associating with such organizations. However, the OSA clarified that it only took action if these groups used the university's name or claim affiliation with UST.

In 2018, several UST Senior High School (UST-SHS) students were put on disciplinary probation for organizing a silent protest against the K–12 program. In 2019, a first-year College of Education student was suspended for convening an organization that advocated for lowering the minimum age of criminal responsibility. In 2020, a student on the UST-SHS Student Council who had publicly associated himself with the left-wing militant group Anakbayan in a Facebook post calling for "academic ease" was expelled. In 2021, several student activists were also given show-cause orders for joining "unrecognized student organizations", including members of the UST-SHS Student Council after a complaint was filed by a parent alleging that members of the UST-SHS Student Council were recruiting members for Anakbayan. The complaint was eventually dismissed due a lack of sufficient evidence. In 2024, a Faculty of Arts and Letters student was given a show-cause order due to her affiliation as the chairperson of a local chapter of the Panday Sining mass organization.

In August 2020, a memorandum from the university's Office of Student Affairs (OSA) required accredited student organizations to submit social media content for approval, grant their organization's adviser full login access, and limit officer access to three individuals. The memo was criticized by student leaders and organizations for introducing "unnecessary" paperwork and infringing on their freedom of expression.

During the 2023 elections for the UST Central Student Council, The Varsitarian published an editorial highlighting a pattern of declining student involvement in student elections. The editorial cited outdated campaign and election policies as well as alleged "oppressive tactics" by the OSA against CSC officers who have voiced concerns regarding student repression as contributing factors to the lower voter turnout and candidate engagement.

=== COVID-19 Pandemic ===
College of Science professors Nicanor Austriaco and Bernhard Egwolf are members of the OCTA Research team that is associated with forecasts and analyses of the country's COVID-19 situation. They also developed an epidemiological model, UST CoV-2 Model, which released COVID-19 cases and death projections in Metro Manila. In the early part of the pandemic, the study recommended the need to increase the daily testing capacity that would potentially control the outbreak. In 2023, Austriaco's 2021 project to develop a yeast-based oral vaccine against COVID-19 was funded by the DOST. A study group from the Faculty of Medicine and Surgery proposed a strategy to the government entitled "War Plan Mayon", to combat the pandemic through herd immunity. Faculty of Engineering professor Anthony James Bautista invented the LISA robot (Logistic Indoor Service), a telepresence and service assistant robot that delivers medicine and allows medical workers to manage isolated patients in the UST Hospital.

Despite the COVID-19 situation, most of the traditional activities such as the Misa de Apertura and Discurso de Apertura, the Thomasian Welcome Walk, Paskuhan, and closing ceremonies continued virtually. The Welcome Walk, ROARientation, and send-off rites, in particular, were streamed live in a Minecraft server. In 2022, the university returned to holding these traditional festivities in person. The closing ceremonies for the classes of 2020 to 2022 were held in July, while the Welcome Walk for the classes of 2026 and homecoming rites for the classes of 2024 and 2025 resumed in August.

=== TomasinoWeb 7-Eleven incident ===
In February 2024, the OSA ordered student organization TomasinoWeb to take down a photo it published of College of Information and Computing Sciences (CISC) students entering a 7-Eleven convenience store. The takedown was issued due to allegations from the university that the photo became a "source of public ridicule towards CISC students" due to the similarity of the CISC uniform with 7-Eleven's employee uniforms. The organization was also threatened with non-accreditation over the photo. Following the incident, TomasinoWeb's organization adviser resigned in response to the censorship of the photo.

Several organizations within and outside UST have called out the takedown as an "attack on press freedom", while hundreds of UST alumni have also started a petition in solidarity with TomasinoWeb, urging the university to end their "repressive, arbitrary, and outdated policies". The Office of Public Affairs has since stated that it is undertaking "collaborative efforts" to resolve the matter. In February, The Flame published an editorial on the incident sarcastically thanking the OSA for causing bad press for the university as a result of mishandling the TomasinoWeb incident. TomasinoWeb eventually resumed operations on March 8, 2024 following the appointment of an interim adviser. On March 14, 2024, the OSA issued a statement announcing that a technical working group will hold a dialogue with representatives of "recognized student organizations" and assess student-related policies and guidelines.

In March 2024, Kabataan representative Raoul Manuel filed House Resolution No. 1633 urging the House of Representatives to investigate alleged censorship and threats by the OSA against TomasinoWeb and other perceived "democratic rights violations" within the University. The resolution seeks to address these issues and advocate for improved policies that support academic and campus press freedom for students. On March 13, 2024, the resolution was referred to the Philippine House Committee on Rules, with a hearing yet to be scheduled.

=== LGBT student groups ===
In the 1960s, the first LGBT organization, Tigresa Royal, was established but was never recognized by the university. In 2013, HUE, a new LGBT organization was established. Like Tigresa Royal, the university also denied HUE's recognition as a university organization. In 2015, the university ordered numerous organizations to take down all rainbow-themed profile pics of its members in social media after the legalization of same-sex marriage in the United States. The order was defied by numerous students of the university, marking the beginning of the UST Rainbow Protest. In July 2016, various student organizations supported the filing of the SOGIE Equality Bill. In March 2018, during the passage of the bill, numerous UST student organizations, including UST Hiraya, a feminist organization, backed the bill's passage.

== Spanish royal patronage ==
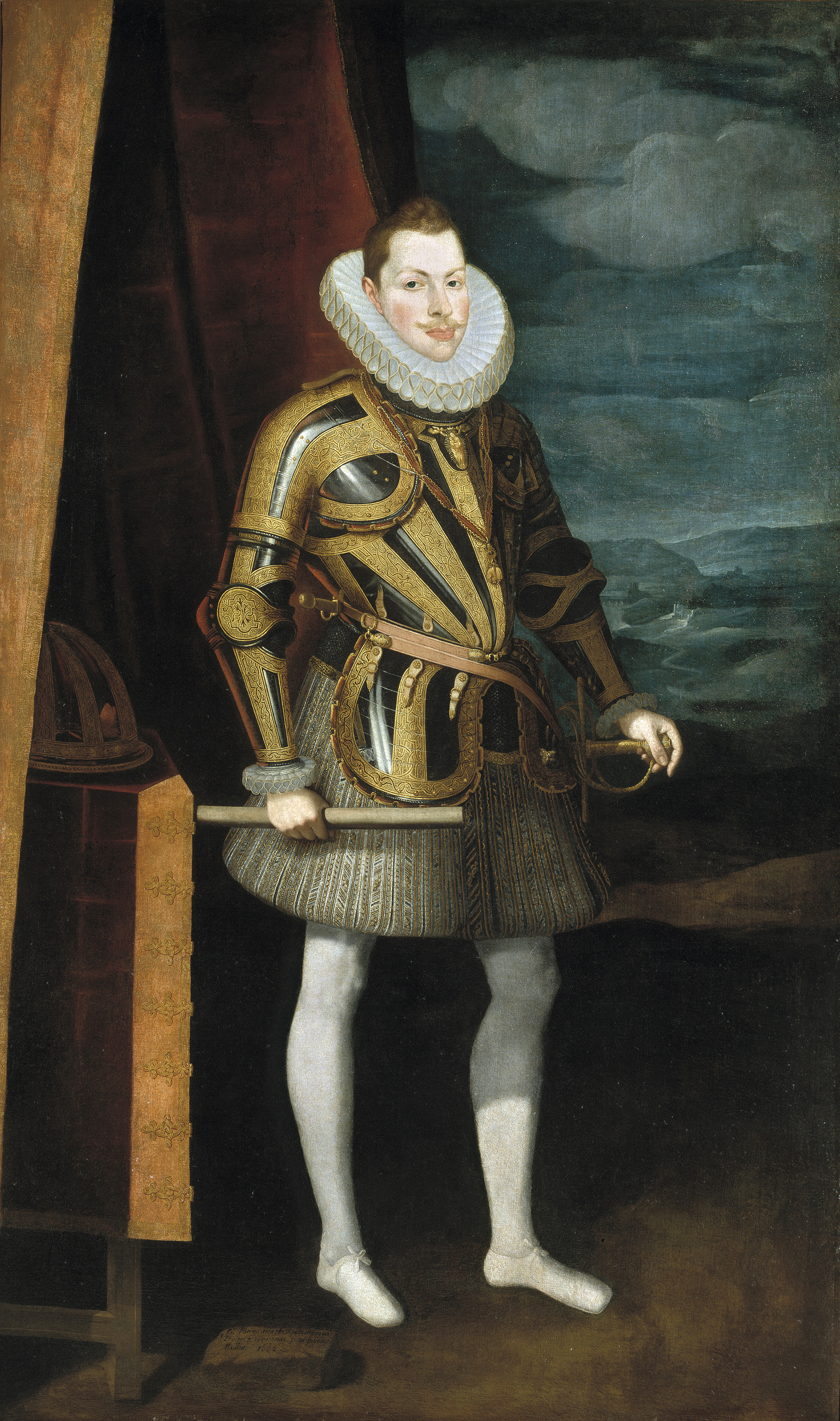
King Philip III

The series of benefices, favors and privileges granted to UST by the Spanish monarchs started in 1609 when Philip III issued a royal cédula requesting from the governor and the audencia a report on the projected college. He petitioned Pope Paul V for the granting of faculties of Philosophy and Theology. These faculties were implemented by order of Philip IV in 1624, and three years later this monarch petitioned Rome for the extension of these faculties for an additional ten years. He was the same monarch who petitioned the Pope to elevate the college to the level of a university in 1645.

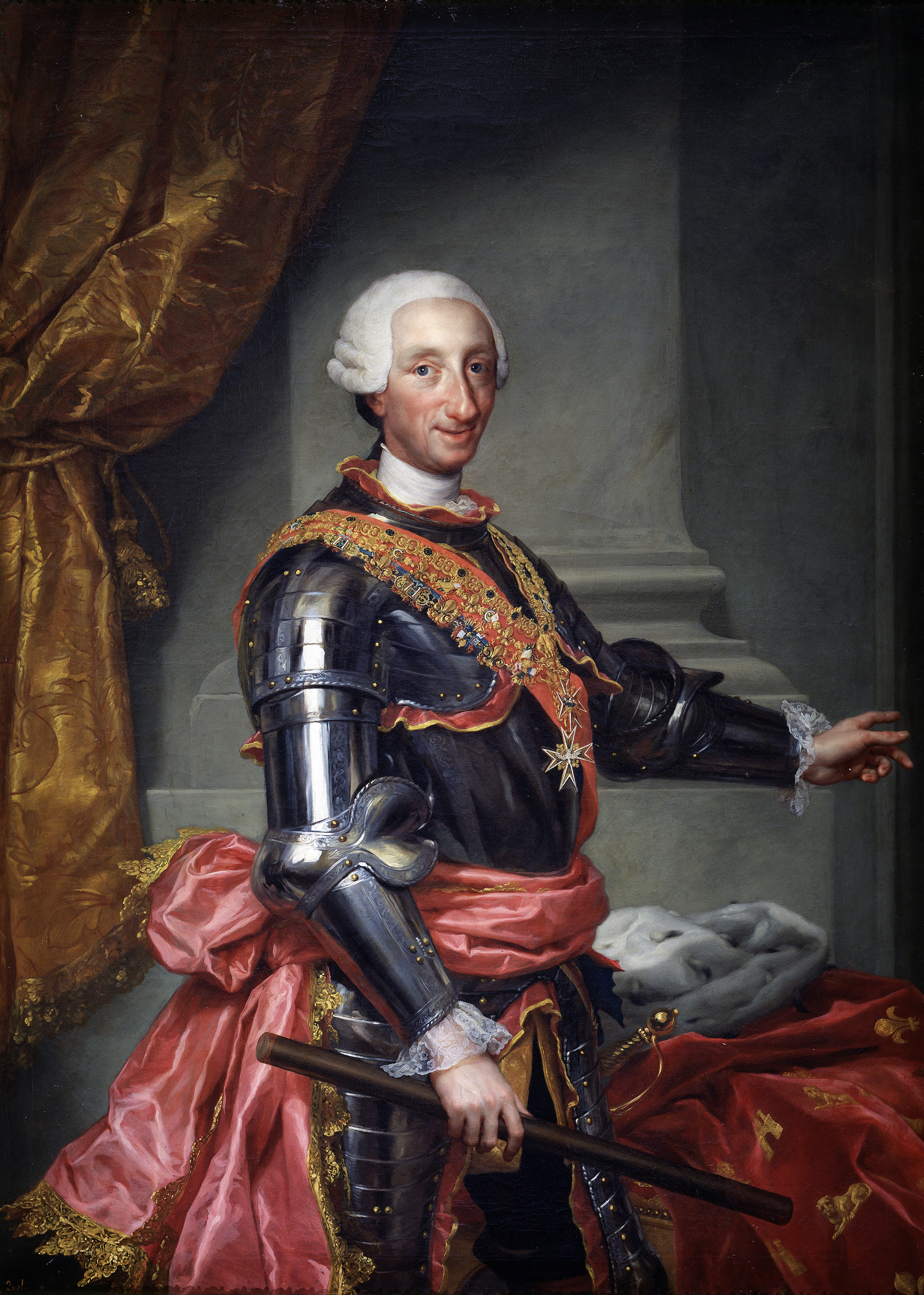
King Charles III

In 1649, in response to the expressions of royal concern shown over its welfare, the university community addressed Philip IV, saying that the university "requests Your Royal Highness that you keep her within your Royal Solicitude, because she has been, from her very beginnings, a fruit of your royal bounty, and from the desire that she should grow and progress ever through efforts so Royal and so Catholic."

King Charles II, in 1680, added to this list of benefices already granted by his predecessors, when in Royal Cédula he formally declared that the university be placed under his royal patronage.

Another Royal Cédula of Charles II, with two others from Philip V, his successor, resulted in 1733 in the creation of the Faculties of Civil and Canon Laws. At the same time, the Holy See granted the university faculties to give academic degrees in those two disciplines and in others that might eventually be established.

In 1781 King Charles III authorized the university to prepare its own statutes, independent of those of the University of Mexico through, which, up to that time, the university was governed.

When, in 1762, Manila was occupied briefly by the British, the rector of the university, Fr. Domingo Collantes, organized four companies of university youth to help in the defense of the city. Acknowledging this act of loyalty, King Charles III, in his Royal Cédula of March 7, 1785, expressed his "gratitude and benevolence", and renewed his protection and patronage, and granted the university the title of "Very Loyal", as well as the title and honors corresponding to it, as a "Royal University".

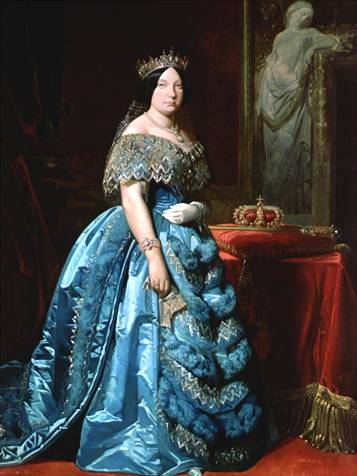
Queen Isabel II

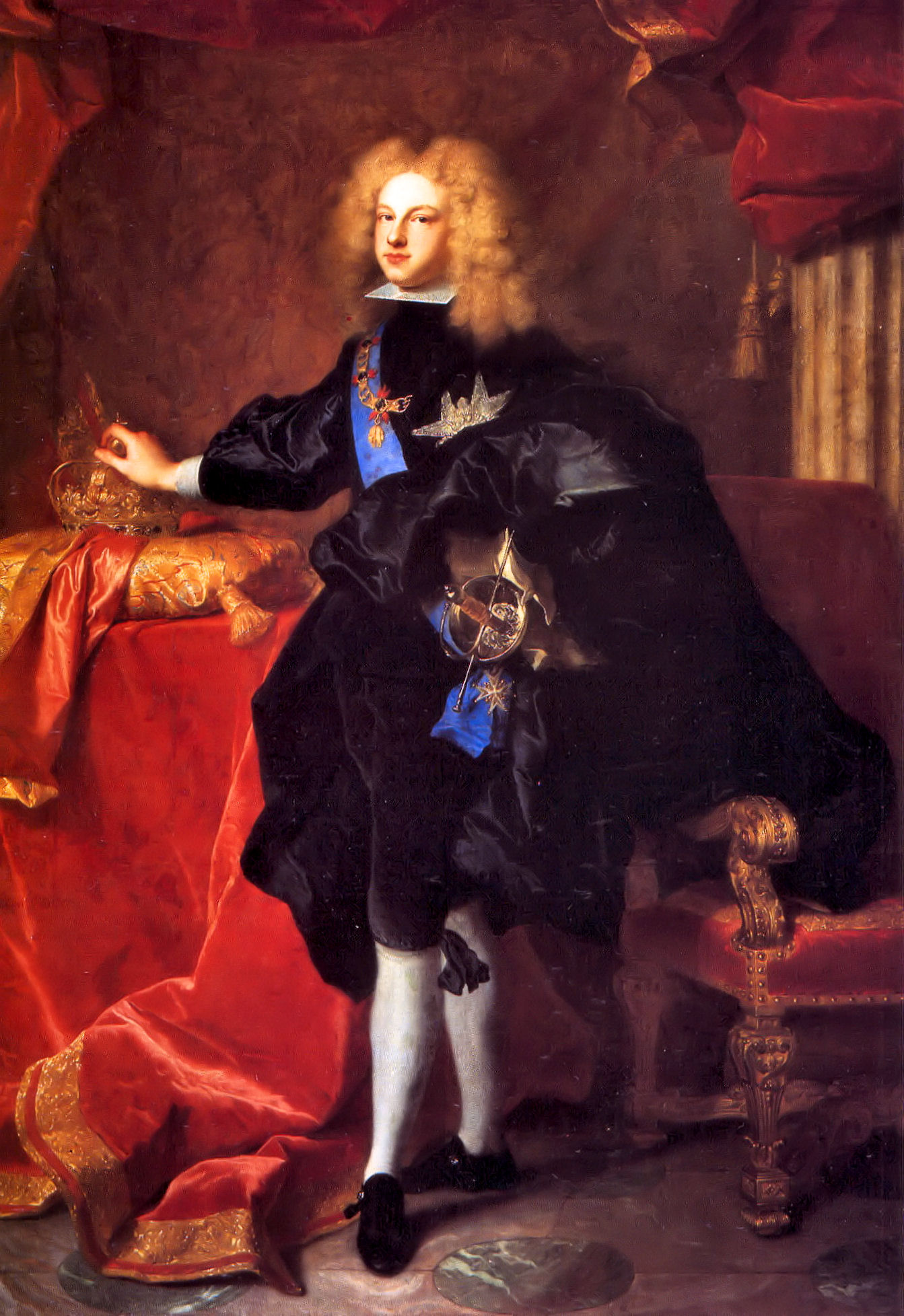
King Philip V

In 1865 Queen Isabel II declared the University of Santo Tomas the center for public education throughout the Philippines, and affiliated to her all colleges and schools throughout the country, and constituting the rector of the university the supervisor and inspector of all the centers of learning so affiliated to the university.

In 1871 the Faculties of Medicine and Pharmacy were established, and three years later, by authority of a Royal Order given by Alfonso XII, the School for Notaries was created.

In an act of gratitude for the nearly 300 years of royal benevolence and to establish a continuous affinity between Spain and UST, the university bestowed the title of Royal Patron to King Juan Carlos (Royal House of Bourbon) of Spain in February 1974 (then Prince of Spain).

== Seal, flag and colors ==
1619–1733	1636	1868–1935	Rose vignette 1875–1909	1957–1983

The oldest seal used by the university is first seen in an examination book Libros de piques that is found in the UST Archives.

The university seal from 1868 to 1983 is set in a cardioid shield. The globus cruciger and the Dominican hound carrying a flaming torch are perched atop the shield. Directly below is the sun of Thomas Aquinas, whose rays extend throughout the whole seal. The seal depicts three or four ovals bearing different coats of arms.

In the 1868–1935 seal, the left oval contains the Papal insignia symbolizing the apostolic concession by which the college was raised to be a university. The right oval contains the coat of arms similar to the coat of arms of Spain used in 1700-1868 and 1834–1930 to indicate the protection which Philip IV of Spain vouchsafed to the university. The center oval contains the cross of the Dominican order, which is surrounded by a rosary, crowned by the star of Saint Dominic, and flanked below by a palm branch (representing martyrdom) to its left and white lilies to the right.

The inner lower border of the seal is lined with the Latin name of the university Pontificia et Regalis S(ancti) Thomæ Aquinatis Universitas Manilana. The upper half of the seal is flanked by laurel leaves on both sides and the lower half by a collar similar to the insignia used by the Order of the Golden Fleece.

The 1935–1938, 1937–1946, and 1957–1983 versions had changes depending on the government of the country. In the 1935–1938 seal, the coat of arms of the Commonwealth of the Philippines replaced the coat of arms of the Spanish East Indies. A fourth oval was added in the 1937–1946 seal to include the Spanish East Indies. The 1957–1983 seal replaced the coat of arms of the Commonwealth of the Philippines with the coat of arms of the Philippines.

In June 2011, a new seal was unveiled, but due to its typeface and color selections, it garnered critical reaction on social media. The sudden change for a new seal was made after the Roman Curia suggested uniformity in the titles and the name of UST. The university's Council of Regents decided to include UST's name in the new seal and drop the titles of Royal and Pontifical because they are not part of the official name of the university. The controversial seal was revised a month after. The Council of Regents reverted to the previous seal and included UST's honorific titles Pontifical and Royal, and the name of the university.

Elements of the University of Santo Tomas Seal

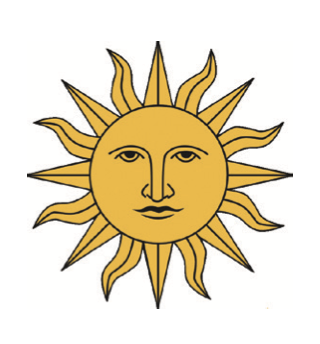
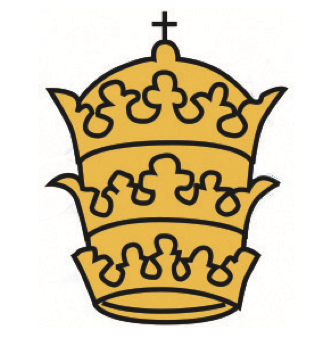
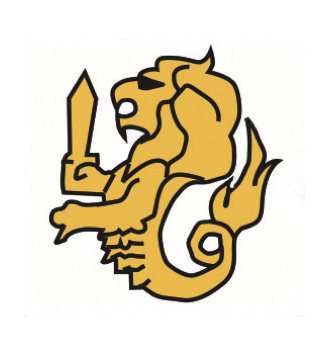
Symbol	Meaning	Description
	The sun of St. Thomas Aquinas
	The papal tiara	The papal tiara indicates the pontifical roots of the university.
	A sea-lion	The image is derived from the seal of Manila.

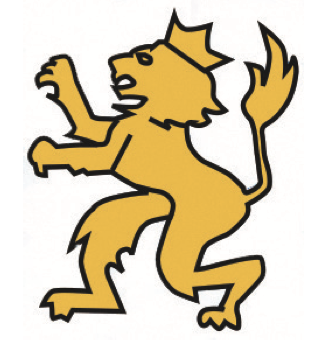
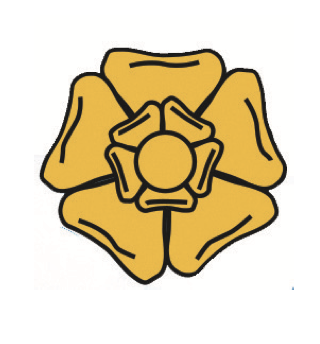
Symbol	Meaning	Description
	The Dominican Cross
	A lion rampant	The lion rampant is derived from the Coat of arms of Spain.
	A rose	The rose represents the patronage of the Blessed Virgin Mary.

The current seal of the university is set in a modern French shield quartered by the Dominican Cross. The surrounding inscription reads the full name of UST: Pontifical and Royal University of Santo Tomas, Manila, and the foundation year, 1611. The symbols are set on a field of Marian blue. The colors, as officially defined by the university's identity guidelines, define the gold and blue as Pantone 213 C and Pantone 298 C, respectively.

The Tongues of Fire is the logo of the UST Quadricentennial Celebration. It features the outline of the UST Main Building tower and four flames that spell out UST. The tongues of fire reference the future of the university and are reminiscent of the stripes of a tiger. It is designed by alumnus Francisco Doplon.

Flag of the Pontical and Royal University of Santo Tomas
- Adopted: 2011
- Design: A horizontal bicolor with equal bands of White and Gold. At the center is the Seal of the University of Santo Tomas
- Designed by: Unknown

The current university flag was adopted in June 2011 alongside the current version of the seal of the University of Santo Tomas. It is a horizontal bicolor flag with equal bands of white and golds. At the center of it is the seal with the words "Pontificia et Regalis S. Thomæ Aquinatis Universitas Manilana" or the "Pontifical and Royal University of Santo Tomas, Manila" in Latin.

== Establishment of colleges ==
=== Past and present degree-conferring academic units ===
Academic unit	Year of establishment	Brief history	Reference
Faculty of Sacred Theology	1611	The college is considered as the oldest academic unit in the university.	
Faculty of Philosophy	1611	The college is considered as the oldest philosophy school in the Philippines.	
Faculty of Liberal Arts (defunct)	1611		
Faculty of Canon Law	1733	The college began as an integral course of moral theology in 1681. It became the Facultad de Derecho Canonico in 1733 and is the oldest canon law school in the Philippines.	
Faculty of Civil Law	1734	The college also began as integral course of moral theology in 1681. It became the Facultad de Derecho Civil in 1734. It is the oldest law school in the Philippines and is the oldest of all civil colleges.	
Faculty of Morals, Sacred Scripture & Liturgy (defunct)	1825		
School of Drawing and Painting(defunct)	1865		
Faculty of Medicine & Surgery	1871	The college began as Facultad de Medicina y Farmacia in 1871. It is the oldest school of medicine in the Philippines.	
Faculty of Pharmacy	1871	The college began as Facultad de Medicina y Farmacia in 1871. It is the oldest school of pharmacy in the Philippines.	
College of Notaries(defunct)	1875		
School of Matrons; or School of Midwifery (defunct)	1879		
School of Ministering Surgeons (defunct)	1880	As Cirujanos Ministrantes in 1880	
School of Pharmacy for the Practitioner (defunct)	1880		
Faculty of Arts and Letters	1896	The college was founded in 1896 as Facultad de Filosofia y Letras. A few programs of the defunct College of Liberal Arts were merge with the faculty to become the Faculty of Arts and Letters.	
Faculty of Sciences (defunct)	1896		
College of Dentistry(defunct)	1904		
Faculty of Engineering	1907	The college was founded in 1907 as School of Civil Engineering.	
College of Education	1926		
College of Liberal Arts(defunct)	1926	Programs in the College of Liberal Arts were in incorporated in the Faculty of Arts and Letters and College of Science.	
College of Science	1926	Founded as the College of Liberal Arts in 1926	
UST High School	1928		
College of Architecture	1930	It was founded in 1930 as the department of architecture under the Faculty of Engineering. It became the School of Architecture and Fine Arts 1938 and College in 1946. The department of fine arts separated from the college in 2000.	
College of Commerce and Business Administration	1934	It was founded as the School of Commerce in 1934. It became as College of Commerce and Accountancy in 1988. It was renamed in 2007 as College of Commerce and Business Administration	
Graduate School	1938		
Normal School (defunct)	1940		
Elementary School (defunct)	1941	The school closed in 2011.	
Conservatory of Music	1945		
College of Nursing	1946	Opened as the School of Nursing	
Education High School	1950		
Institute of Nutrition (defunct)	1970		
Institute of Technological Courses (defunct)	1972		
College of Rehabilitation Sciences	1974	The college was founded in 1974 as Institute of Physical Therapy under the College of Science and Faculty of Medicine & Surgery. It gained full autonomy in 1993. It became a full-fledged college in 2001.	
Sisters' Institute of Theological Formation	1978	It was founded as an institute affiliated with the Faculty of Sacred Theology	
Institute of Physical Education & Athletics	2000	The university established the Department of Physical Education on January 16, 1929.	
College of Fine Arts and Design	2000	It started as the Department of Fine arts in 1935. It became as the School of Architecture and Fine Arts in 1938 and eventually elevated to the rank of college in 1946. It separated from the College of Architecture to become an independent college in 2000.	
Alfredo M. Velayo College of Accountancy	2005	The college began with the College of Commerce in 1988 as the College of Commerce and Accountancy.	
College of Tourism & Hospitality Management	2009	It was founded in 2006 as the Institute of Tourism and Hospitality Management. It was elevated to the rank of college in 2009.	
College of Information and Computing Sciences	2014	It started as the Institute of Computer Sciences under the College of Science in 1999. It transferred to the Faculty of Engineering in 2004 as Department of Information and Computer Studies. It became a separate institute affiliated with the Faculty of Engineering in 2014.	
UST Senior High School	2016		
Graduate School of Law	2017		

== Histiography of the university ==
- Reseña Histórica de la Universidad Santo Tomás by Manuel Artigas y Cuerva, 1911
- Sinopsis Histórica Documentada de la Universidad de Santo Tomás de Manila by Juan Garcia Sanchez, 1929, translated by James H. Bass
- The University of Santo Tomas in the Twentieth Century by Josefina Lim-Pe 1973
- Culture of Excellence, Culture of Conscience. The First Five Filipino Dominican Rectors of the University of Santo Tomas - Published in 2006, this is a collection of essays by Lourd de Veyra, Joyce Arriola, Ophelia Dimalanta, Ramil Gulle and Alfred Yuson.
- A History of the University of Santo Tomas: Four Centuries of Higher Education in the Philippines (1611-2011)
- A Wartime Legacy, The University of Santo Tomas During The Second World War 1941-1945 by Jose Victor Z. Torres
