= University of Santo Tomas System =

Private tertiary schools in the Philippines

- Type: Private Catholic organization
- Established: 2012; 14 years ago
- Founder: Order of Preachers
- Religious affiliation: Roman Catholic (Dominican)
- Location: Philippines
- Campus: 6 urban campuses: Manila; Legazpi; Quezon; General Santos; Santa Rosa; Iloilo
- Mascot: Bengal Tigers

The University of Santo Tomas System is a network of private schools that belong to the Dominican Province of the Philippines. The system is composed of its six campuses at cities of Manila, Legazpi, Quezon City, General Santos, Santa Rosa, and Iloilo.

The UST System is one of the two educational institution systems of the Dominicans of the Philippine Dominican Province. The other is the Letran System, which has four campuses.

== Institutions ==
The University of Santo Tomas System consists of four existing campuses and one upcoming satellite campuses located in Southern Tagalog. The Manila campus is the main educational institution of the system.

The integration of select Dominican schools was a mandate of the 2012 and 2016 Provincial Chapters of the Philippine Dominican Province. In the 2012 Acts, the integration was planned to facilitate the coordination of the apostolic priorities and sharing of resources of several institutions. In December 2014, the Aquinas University of Legazpi (AUL) in Albay, Angelicum College in Quezon City, and Angelicum School Iloilo, signed a memorandum of intent to integrate with UST Manila. The future UST campus in Santa Rosa, Laguna, will also be part of the system. The integration plan was reinforced in the 2016 Acts.

The two existing constituent units, UST–Legazpi and UST Angelicum College, are independent campuses. Each campus is headed by a rector. The board of trustees of UST Angelicum College is composed of 12 representatives from UST Manila and three from UST Angelicum College. Angelicum College's signature non-graded system of education is retained.

UST–Legazpi has fiscal and administrative independence from the main campus. The rector and board of trustees are also different. The integration of AUL also entailed the renaming of its university hospital to UST–Legazpi Hospital.

In December 2020, the construction of the Dr. Tony Tan Caktiong Innovation Center began in UST Santa Rosa. It is the first building in the campus.

Campus	Location	Foundation	Integration	Rector	Programs
Main	Manila	1611	(Main campus)	Richard Ang	Basic education, undergraduate, graduate, and professional
Legazpi	Legazpi, Albay	1948	2017	Edwin Lao	Basic education, undergraduate, and graduate
General Santos	General Santos	2024		Richard Ang	Undergraduate
Santa Rosa	Santa Rosa, Laguna	Upcoming			
Angelicum College	Quezon City	1972	2017	John Stephen Besa	Basic education and undergraduate
Angelicum School Iloilo	Iloilo City	1978			Basic education

=== Distribution map ===
Geographic distribution of University of the Santo Tomas System

== Admission ==
For the school year 2025–2026, the University of Santo Tomas Entrance Test (USTET) is administered to applicants from the Manila, Quezon City, and General Santos campuses.
