= University of Santo Tomas Santa Rosa =

Upcoming Philippine university

University of Santo Tomas - Santa Rosa
- Unibersidad ng Santo Tomas - Santa Rosa (Filipino)
- Type: Private research non-profit higher education institution
- Established: April 11, 2024
- Founder: Order of Preachers
- Religious affiliation: Roman Catholic (Dominican)
- Location: Santa Rosa, Laguna, Philippines; 14°15′04″N 121°05′17″E
- Campus: Urban 40 hectares (400,000 m^{2})
- Patron saint: Thomas Aquinas
- Colors: Gold, black, and white
- Mascot: Golden Tiger

University of Santo Tomas Santa Rosa, also known as UST Manila Annex (UST MAx) is an upcoming university in Santa Rosa, Laguna, Philippines. It is one of the five campuses in the University of Santo Tomas System. The new campus is envisioned to intensify the research activities of UST Manila by becoming a technological and innovative hub in Laguna.

== History ==
The campus was inaugurated on April 19, 2006, which was led by then UST Manila rector Tamerlane Lana and attended by tycoon Lucio Tan.

The construction of the campus was delayed for several years by changes in the administration, the Quadricentennial Celebration from 2009 to 2012, and the prioritization of the projects in UST Manila. A second groundbreaking ceremony was held on September 10, 2017, and led by then university rector Herminio Dagohoy.

== Campus ==
The campus is located on a 40-hectare (99-acre) lot in Sta. Elena City, a Vista Land development, within the jurisdiction of Barangay Don Jose, Santa Rosa, Laguna.

The UST Dr. Tony Tan Caktiong Innovation Center (UST-TTCIC) is the first completed building outside the UST Manila campus. It is named after Tony Tan Caktiong, an alumnus of UST Manila and founder of Jollibee Foods Corporation. The design of the three-story structure was headed by Casas+ Architects' Carmelo Casas, a UST Manila alumnus. The groundbreaking ceremony for the building took place in December 2020, and the formal inauguration aligned with UST's 412th anniversary on April 28, 2023. The ₱300-million center will annex the Department of Science and Technology-TomasINNO Center, a technology business incubator based in the Manila campus.

=== Future developments ===
As of 2024, the campus is in the first phase of development, which is building the UST Sta. Rosa Research Complex (UStaRRCo). The USTaRRCo will have three research institutes, namely: the UST-William T. Belo Interdisciplinary Research Institute, the Research Institute for Health and Biomedical Sciences, and the Research Institute for Data Science and Cybersystems.

The UST-Dr. William T. Belo Interdisciplinary Research Institute (UST-WiTBIRIn) is the second structure to be built in the campus. It was named after Dr. Belo, an engineering alumnus of UST Manila, who founded the Wilcon Depot Inc. The building was designed by JSLA Architects, an architecture firm founded by university alumnus Jose Siao Ling. Its construction broke ground on January 26, 2024 and is expected to be finished in one or two years. The building was topped off on May 8, 2025, and will be inaugurated on December 12, 2025.

== See also ==
- University of Santo Tomas in Manila
- University of Santo Tomas–Legazpi
- University of Santo Tomas General Santos
