= University of Santo Tomas General Santos =

Roman Catholic university in General Santos, Philippines

- Unibersidad ng Santo Tomas General Santos (Filipino)
- Type: Private Research Non-profit Higher education institution
- Established: April 11, 2024
- Religious affiliation: Roman Catholic (Dominican)
- Rector: Richard Ang
- Students: 317 (2025)
- Location: General Santos, Philippines; 6°09′39″N 125°13′32″E
- Campus: 82.2 hectares (822,000 m^{2})
- Student publication: The Southern Veritas
- Patron saint: Thomas Aquinas
- Colors: Gold, black, and white
- Mascot: Bengal Tiger
- Website: gensan.ust.edu.ph

The University of Santo Tomas General Santos (UST GenSan; Filipino: Unibersidad ng Santo Tomas General Santos) is a private, Catholic higher education institution in General Santos, Philippines. The UST General Santos is the first UST campus in Visayas and Mindanao. It is an extension campus of UST Manila.

The Main Building of the campus opened in 2024.

== History ==
In 1997, the UST Manila administration acquired land in General Santos in barangays Ligaya and Katangawan, intending to establish an extension campus in the city. However, the development of the campus was delayed due to land classification issues. The site was classified as agricultural until 2013 when it was reassigned as institutional land.

Full development of the campus began with the groundbreaking ceremony held in April 2018. Laying of the foundations began in November 2020 and on December 4, 2021, the topping-off ceremony was held on the view deck.

UST GenSan was projected to be operational by 2021, but the opening date was pushed to 2023. The campus would be finally inaugurated on April 11, 2024.

UST GenSan welcomed 126 freshmen students in 2024 and 213 students in 2025.

On 8 June 2026, a magnitude-7.8 earthquake in Mindanao damaged the UST GenSan Main Building, with the cross tower toppled. No injuries or casualties were recorded, and access to the building was prohibited while authorities conducted structural assessment.

== Campus ==
The campus covers an area of 82.2 hectares (822,000 m^{2}) and has facilities that could accommodate 15,000 students. Its main building is seven-storey high and is fronted by an open plaza. It has a 100-person capacity chapel, library, clinic, org rooms, an auditorium, and function halls.

Future plan includes the establishment of the Arch of the New Century and the UST-Dr. Ricardo S. Po Sr. Integrated Innovation and Research Laboratories (UST PIIRL).

== Academics ==
School	Year founded
Business and Accountancy	2024
Engineering and Information Technology	2024
Health Sciences	2024

The university offers five programs under three pioneering schools, namely the School of Health Sciences, School of Business and Accountancy, and School of Engineering and Information Technology. The five pioneer programs are Pharmacy, Medical Technology, Entrepreneurship, Accounting Information Systems, and Industrial Engineering. The campus is set to offer new programs, namely Accountancy, Biology (Major in Medical Biology), and Civil Engineering (Major in Structural Engineering) in 2026.

== See also ==
- University of Santo Tomas Manila
- University of Santo Tomas–Legazpi
- University of Santo Tomas Santa Rosa
