= Maces of the Rector Magnificus of the University of Santo Tomas =

17th-century silver maces

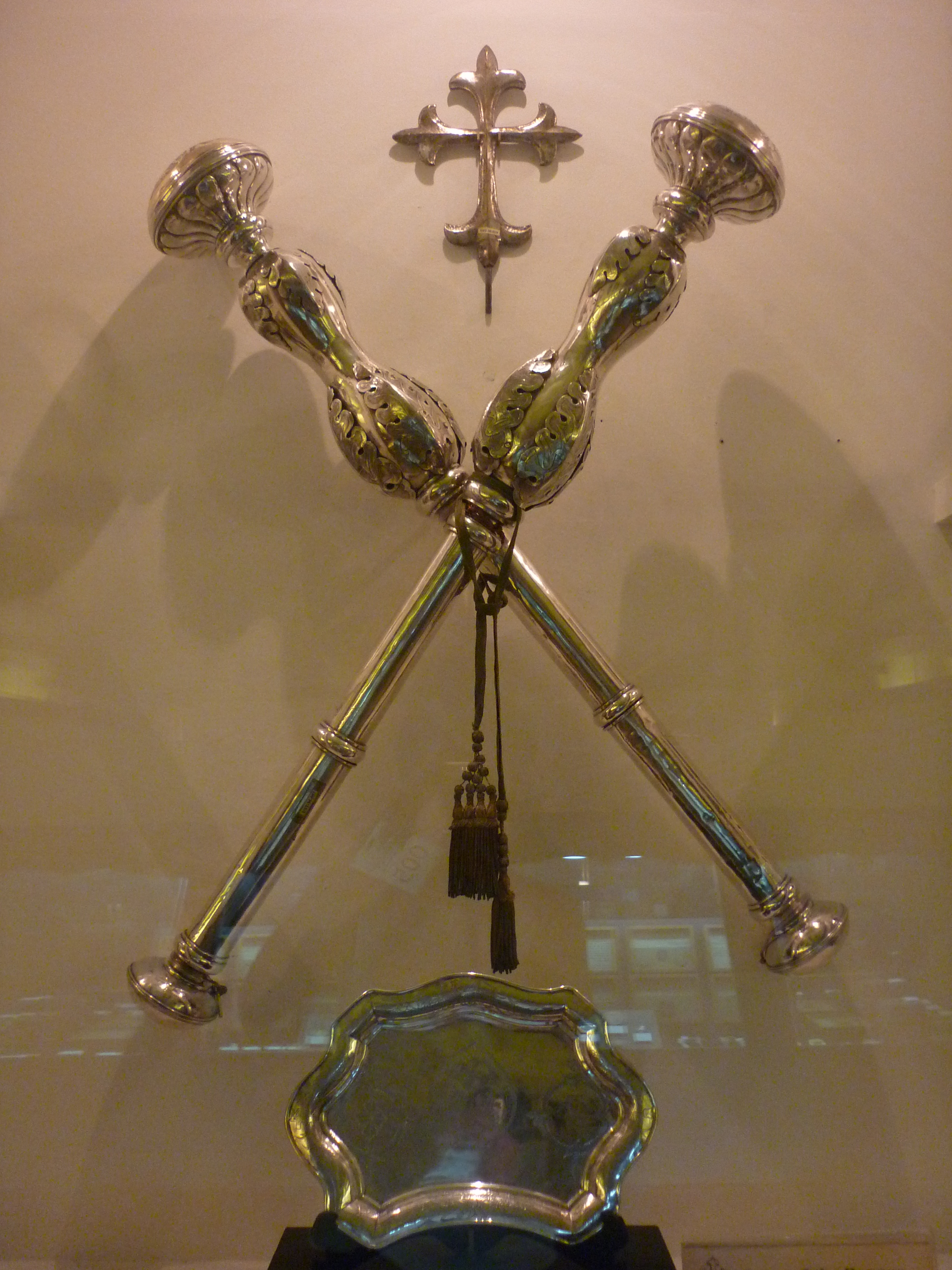
The Maces of the Rector Magnificus of the University of Santo Tomas

The Maces of the Rector Magnificus of the University of Santo Tomas (UST) are 17th-century silver maces which are considered to be the oldest symbols of the office Rector Magnificus of the University of Santo Tomas, the oldest extant European-chartered university in Asia.

== History and symbolism ==
The two maces silver symbolize the spiritual and temporal powers of the Rector Magnificus as the highest authority of the University.

During the Spanish Colonial period, on May 20, 1865, a royal order from Queen Isabella II gave the Rector Magnificus of the University of Santo Tomas the power to direct and supervise all the educational institutions in the Philippines and thus, the Rector became the ex-officio head of the secondary and higher education in the Philippines. All diplomas issued by other schools were approved by the Rector and examinations leading to the issuance of such diplomas were supervised by the professors of UST. This made the maces the symbol of the highest authority in the field of education during those times.

The maces were first used during the 17th century wherein candidates for doctoral degrees were accompanied by the Rector in a parade called Paseo de los Doctores.

== Description ==
The design of the maces is derived from a battle mace and the Roman fasces. The maces are made of pure silver measures 95 x 15 centimetres in diameter. At the top of the mace is the 17th Century seal of the University.

== Procedure ==
Today, members of the Academic Senate hold processions at the opening of each academic year and during solemn investitures in academic gowns, following the style of Spanish academic regalia. The maces are borne by bedeles ("macebearers"), and are included in the parade for their academic symbolism.

The maces are now permanently kept at the University's Museum of Arts and Sciences.

== See also ==
- Rector Magnificus of the University of Santo Tomas
