= UST Museum of Arts and Sciences =

University museum in Manila, Philippines

University of Santo Tomas Museum

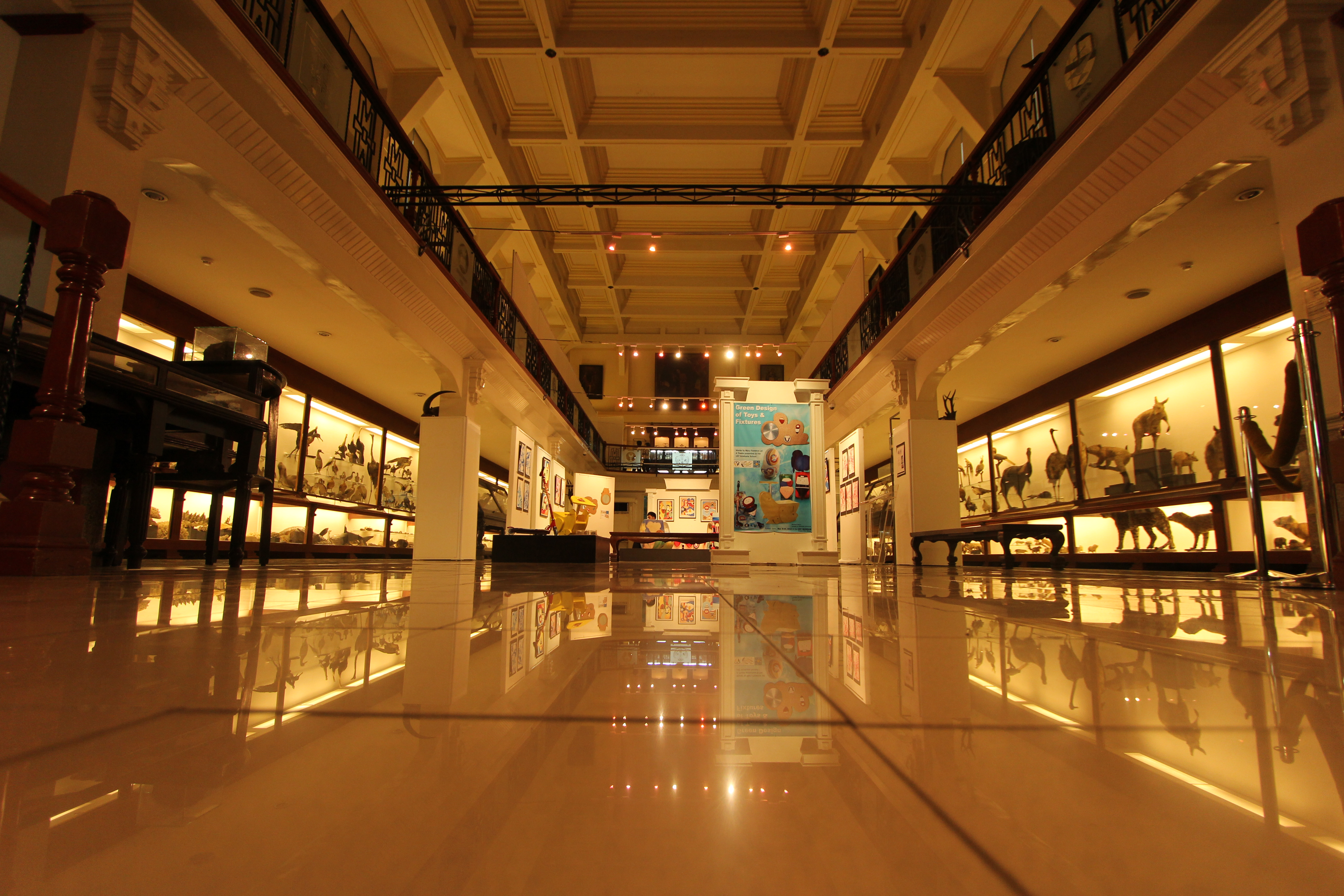
- Established: 1869
- Location: Main Building, University of Santo Tomas, Espana Boulevard, Sampaloc, Manila
- Coordinates: 14°36′36.7″N 120°59′21.4″E
- Type: University Museum
- Directors: Isidro C. Abaño, O.P.
- Website: ustmuseum.ust.edu.ph

The University of Santo Tomas Museum is the oldest existing museum in the Philippines. It started as a Gabinete de Fisica, or observation room, of mineral, botanical and biological collections in the 17th century. Under the old Spanish educational law the collections were used as classroom materials, especially in Medicine and Pharmacy.

== History ==
Ramon Martinez, O.P., a professor of natural history, founded the UST Museum of Arts and Sciences in 1871. However, it was Casto de Elera, O.P., who started to systematically gather and catalogue all the collections, some of which date back to 1682.

Considered the oldest school-based museum in the Philippines, the UST Museum became a repository of scientific and artistic articles, and objets d’art. Starting in 1941, the museum acquired the works of Filipino masters such as Fernando and Pablo Amorsolo, Carlos Francisco, Vicente Manansala, and Galo Ocampo. The museum has permanent displays for specimens of natural history, ethnographic materials, Oriental art objects, Philippine religious images, paintings, and Coins, Medals, and Memorabilia. The painting collection includes works from the 17th to the 20th century.

Items related to the History of the University of Santo Tomas are also kept in the Museum, such as the Maces of the Rector Magnificus of the University of Santo Tomas, the Rector's Collar of then-Fr. Leonardo Legaspi, OP, and two papal chairs used by Pope St. John Paul II in 1995, and Pope Francis in 2015.

The museum also houses the museum gallery, a souvenir shop, and a mini-library. The museum gallery has served as the venue for art exhibitions.

== Collections ==
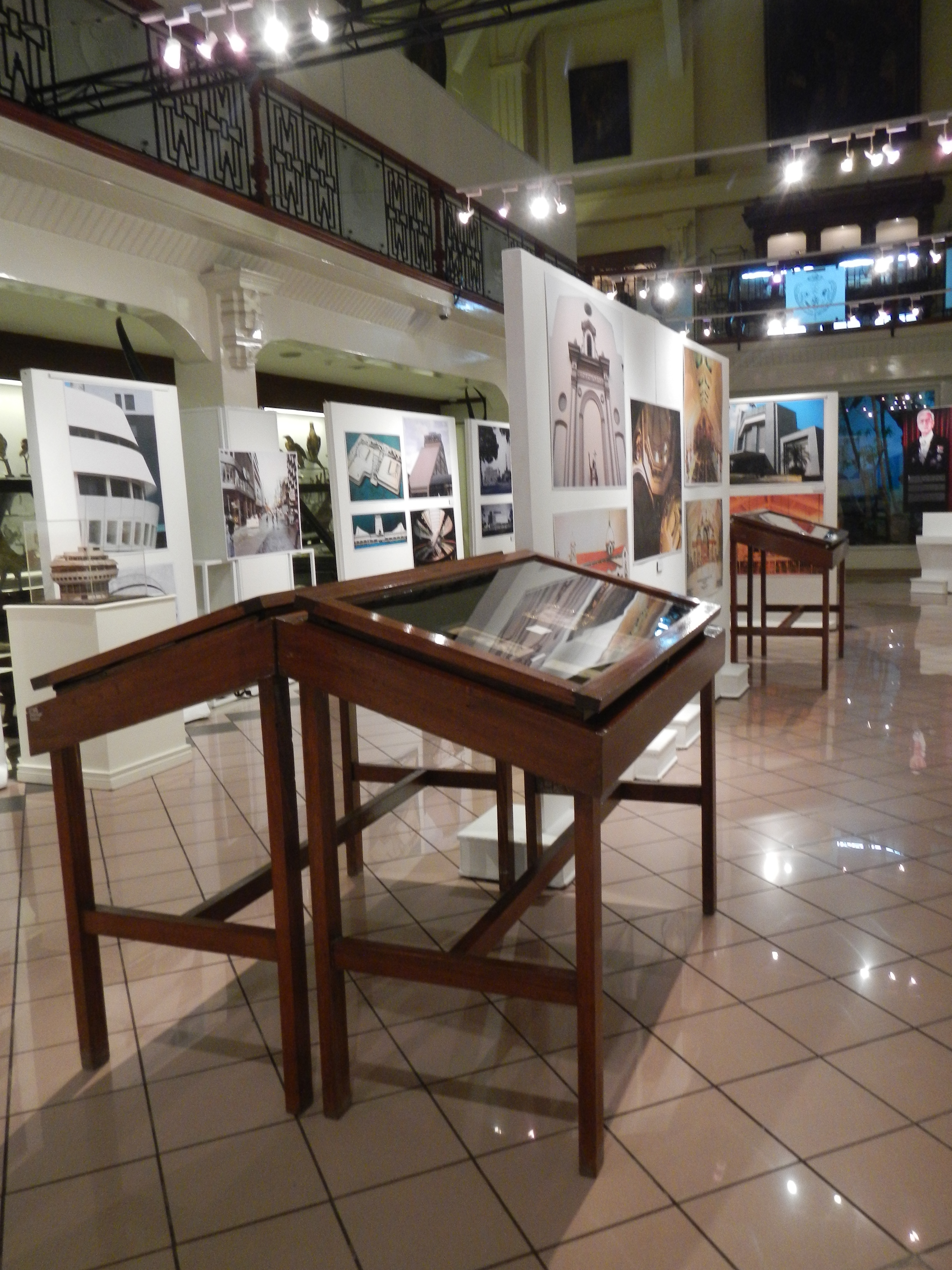

- Natural history
- Visual arts
- Philippine religious images
- Coins, medals and memorabilia
- Non-Philippine Oriental arts
- Ethnography

== Facilities ==
- Library
- Museum gallery
- Curio shop
- Conservation laboratory
