= Juan de Arechederra =

Catholic bishop (1681–1751)

Juan de Arechederra O.P.
- Bishop-elect of Nueva Segovia
- Church: Saint Paul Metropolitan Cathedral
- Province: Ilocos
- Diocese: Diocese of Nueva Segovia
- Appointed: 1750
- Predecessor: Luciano Santiago
- Successor: Manuel del Río Flores

Personal details
- Born: Juan de Arrechederra; September 20, 1681 Caracas, Venezuela
- Died: November 12, 1751 (aged 70) Lal-lo, Cagayan, Captaincy General of the Philippines
- Denomination: Roman Catholicism

Juan de Arechederra

42nd Governor and Captain-General of the Philippines
- In office September 21, 1745 – July 20, 1750
- Monarchs: Philip V of Spain; Ferdinand VI
- Preceded by: Gaspar de la Torre
- Succeeded by: Marquis of Brindisi and Ovando

Juan de Arechederra (Caracas, Venezuela, September 20, 1681 – Nueva Segovia, November 12, 1751) was a Venezuelan (originally Spanish Criollo) friar and member of the Dominican Order who served as the Rector of Colegio de San Juan de Letran from 1725 until 1735 and University of Santo Tomas from 1735 to 1737 and from 1743 to 1745 and Bishop-elect of Nueva Segovia from 1745 and in turn, the Bishop from 1750 until his death in 1751. In Philippine history, he is best remembered as being the Governor-General from 1745 to 1750 who baptized Alimuddin I, the only Catholic Sultan of Sulu.

== Early life and activities ==
Little was known about Arechederra's early life. He was born to Spanish immigrant parents but was later sent to a convent in San Jacinto de Caracas, a city-colony at the Spanish colonial provinces of New Kingdom of Granada. In 1701, he joined the Dominican Order for the province of Santa Cruz, his hometown.

Arechederra went to Mexico to pursue a degree of doctor of theology at the Royal and Pontifical University of Mexico, afterwards a master's degree in theology. By 1713, he joined a Dominican missionary to the Philippines. In the Philippines, he held several posts, such as being the vicar of a parish in Cavite, a professor of theology at the Colegio de San Juan de Letran, and twice served as the Rector Magnificus of the University of Santo Tomas.

== Inquisition and governor-general ==
When Arechederra came to the Philippines, one of his initial positions was to become one of the four superintendent-commissaries appointed by the Holy Office of the Inquisition to assist the Inquisition in the islands. During his time, Filipino natives or Indios were exempted from the Inquisition. For example, when a Spanish mestizo named Jacinta de Jesús was to be charged, Arechederra acquitted her by proposing herself as an Indio. In 1724, he accelerated the Inquisition charges filed against Antoine Guigue, a French missionary based in Guangdong convicted of Jansenism. He was later sentenced to be suspended from priestly actions and perform spiritual exercises until he appeased the Pope.

In 1745, the Bishop of Nueva Segovia Manuel del Río died in office and Arechederra was elected to occupy this position. By July 1745, he assumed the diocese in full capacity while waiting for the Papal Bull proclaiming him as the new bishop. However, Governor-General Gaspar de la Torre died in office on September 21. By virtue of a royal decree issued earlier on August 15, 1734, in case of death of the governor-general, the highest governing person in the Islands shall take the responsibility of running the government. The same day, he assumed the position of being the governor-general and president ad interim of the Real Audiencia.

Having heard of Arechederra's acceptance as the bishop-elect of Nueva Segovia and his inauguration as the new governor-general, a letter coming from Madrid presented Arechederra to the King of Spain in 1750. In return the King ordered bulls recognizing Arechederra as the new Bishop of Nueva Segovia and affirming his position as the governor-general. However, on November 12, 1751, Arechederra died in office without having been consecrated.

During his short reign as the governor-general, Arechederra alternatively ruled in his diocese in Nueva Segovia and the government in Manila.

== Baptismal of Alimuddin I ==
On January 2, 1749, Arechederra welcomed the Sultan of Sulu Azim ud-Din (alternatively spelled as Alimuddin) who sought refuge to the Spanish colonial authorities. Alimuddin I was previously ousted from his position as the sultan in a coup staged by his younger brother, Bantilan who seized the throne. Instead of publicizing his own intention of his refuge, which is to seek help in restoring him to power, Alimuddin I asked Arechederra to baptize him and embrace Christianity. After the examination of two Jesuit priests, he was recommended to be baptized.

On April 29, 1750, baptisms took place at Paniqui, Tarlac. He was renamed as Don Fernando de Alimuddin. His children were educated in Spanish and Catholic education. Before fully pushing his ideals to restore him to power, Arechederra was replaced as a governor-general by the Marquis of Brindisi.

Political offices
| Preceded by Gaspar de la Torre | Governor and Captain-General of the Philippines; 1745–1750 | Succeeded by Marquis of Brindisi and Ovando |
Religious titles
| Preceded by Luciano Santiago | Bishop of Nueva Segovia; 1750–1751 | Succeeded by Manuel del Río Flores |
Academic offices
| Preceded by Vicente de Salazar | Rector Magnificus of the University of Santo Tomas; 1743–1745 | Succeeded by Antonio Lavarias |
| Preceded by Tomas Canduela | Rector Magnificus of the University of Santo Tomas; 1735–1737 | Succeeded by Diego Saénz |
