= Norberto Castillo =

Filipino Catholic priest and academic

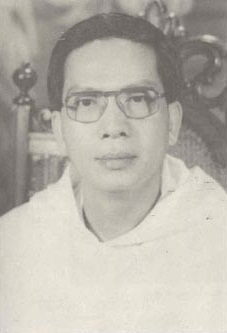

91st Rector Magnificus of the University of Santo Tomas
- In office 1982–1990
- Preceded by: Leonardo Legaspi, O.P., D.D., S.Th.D., LL.D., D.Lit
- Succeeded by: Rolando de la Rosa, O.P., S.Th.D

Personal details
- Born: November 20, 1943 (age 82) Tacloban City, Leyte, Commonwealth of the Philippines
- Education: University of Santo Tomas

Norberto Mendiola Castillo, O.P. (born November 20, 1943) was the 91st Rector Magnificus of the University of Santo Tomas (UST), the oldest and the largest Catholic university in Asia, from 1982–1990.

== Biography ==
Castillo was born on November 20, 1943 in Tacloban City, Leyte. He was ordained to the priesthood on September 8, 1973.

From 1978 to 1982, he was the director and principal of UST Angelicum College in Quezon City and became its academic consultant from 1994 to 2002. From 1976 to 1980, he was vice president and dean of the Colegio de San Juan de Letran. In the Dominican Province of the Philippines, he was appointed the socius or assistant to the prior provincial from 1977 to 1980.

He served as the Rector Magnificus of the University of Santo Tomas for two consecutive terms from 1982 to 1990. At the university, he was elected as dean of the Faculty of Philosophy from 1994 to 1996 and 2008 to 2012, and became the vice rector for religious affairs in 2010. In January 2025, the UST Ecclesiastical Faculties conferred upon him the title of professor emeritus.

== Awards and honors ==
In December 2021, Pope Francis conferred Castillo the Pro Ecclesia et Pontifice for his exemplary service and contribution to the Church.

== Publications ==
=== Books ===
- Timeless Thoughts and Timely Reflections (UST Press, 1986)
- Nature, Science and Values: Readings (UST Press, 1988)

=== Articles ===
Some published articles in Philippiniana Sacra, the official publication of UST Ecclesiastical Faculties.

- "Visuals and Visualizablity as Scientific Themata" (May 1988)
- "Socrates: Prophet or King?" (January 1990)
- "Unique Obsessions: Behind Scientific Discoveries" (January 1991)
- "On Scanning Scientific Discovering: Plastic Control, Substitutionality and the Bootstrap Problematic" (January 1992)
- "Aristotle's Open Society" (May 1996)
- "A Rereading of Scientific Objectivity. Scientific Truth as Subjectivity" (September 1996)

Academic offices
Preceded by Fr. Leonardo Legaspi, O.P.	Rector Magnificus of the University of Santo Tomas; 1982-1990	Succeeded by Fr. Rolando de la Rosa, O.P.
