= Rolando de la Rosa =

Rector Magnificus of the Pontifical University of St. Thomas Aquinas, Rome

95th Rector Magnificus of the University of Santo Tomas
- In office 2008–2012
- Preceded by: Rev. Fr. Prof. Dr. Ernesto Arceo, OP
- Succeeded by: Very Rev. Fr. Prof. Dr. Herminio Dagohoy, O.P., Ph.D., M.A.

Chairman of the Commission on Higher Education
- In office October 18, 2004 – April 4, 2005
- Preceded by: Rolando Ramos Dizon
- Succeeded by: Carlito Puno

92nd Rector Magnificus of the University of Santo Tomas
- In office 1990–1998
- Preceded by: Fr. Norberto M. Castillo, O.P
- Succeeded by: Fr. Tamerlane R. Lana, O.P

President of the Association of Catholic Universities of the Philippines
- In office 1990–1998

President of the International Council of Universities of Saint Thomas Aquinas
- In office 1996–1998

Provincial Councilor of Dominican Province of the Philippines
- In office 1996–1998

Rector of the Colegio de San Juan de Letran Calamba
- In office 1998–2004

Personal details
- Born: June 27, 1953 (age 73) Legazpi, Albay
- Education: University of Santo Tomas

Rolando V. de la Rosa, O.P. (born June 27, 1953) is the Provincial Archivist of the Dominican Province of the Philippines.

Formerly, he served as the Rector Magnificus of the University of Santo Tomas (UST), the oldest and the largest Catholic university in Asia. A religious leader and a seasoned educator, he was appointed by President Gloria Macapagal Arroyo as the chair of the Commission on Higher Education in 2004.

== Early years and education ==
De la Rosa was born on June 27, 1953 in Legazpi, Albay. He completed his basic education courses at the Aquinas University (Legazpi city and subsequently at the Dominican House of Studies (Washington, D.C.) where he obtained a Bachelor of Arts (AB) degree magna cum laude in Philosophy. He then graduated magna cum laude from the University of Santo Tomas (UST, Manila) with a Bachelor of Sacred Theology (STB) in 1980. He was ordained priest in the Dominican Order on April 3, 1982.

In 1984, de la Rosa earned his Licentiate in Sacred Theology (STL) magna cum laude and a Master of Arts (MA) summa cum laude in higher religious studies, both from UST. At the Katholieke Universiteit Leuven in Belgium he obtained a Doctor of Philosophy (PhD) degree magna cum laude in two programs, i.e. higher religious studies and sacred theology, in 1988.

== Career ==
He served his first two terms as rector of the University of Santo Tomas for eight years, from 1990 to 1998. His aims as rector and president were to develop the university's research capabilities, and expand their outreach programs for community service. He established the Research and Endowment Foundation Incorporated to generate funds to finance continuing research activities in the university. Through this foundation, he was able to generate enough funds to establish the Thomas Aquinas Research Complex that houses today the various research centers in the university as well as the Graduate School. To strengthen and expand the community outreach programs of the university, he established the Office for Community Development which later evolved into the UST SIMBAHAYAN, the umbrella project for all university outreach programs focused on five K's: Karunungan (Knowledge transfer), Kalusugan (Medical missions), Kabuhayan (livelihood projects), Kanlungan (housing projects for the poor and those affected by natural disasters), and Kapayapaan (peace education for communities torn by religious and other conflicts.

As Rector, he became president of the Association of Catholic Universities of the Philippines and a two-time President of the ICUSTA International Council of Universities of Saint Thomas Aquinas. He was the founding president of the DOMNET (Network of Dominican Schools, Colleges and Universities in the Philippines) in 1995. He was chair of the Organizing Committee of the International Youth Forum for the World Youth Day in 1995.

He held various positions in the Dominican Province of the Philippines like Master of Novices, Diffinitor of the Provincial Chapter, Provincial Councilor, as well as Rector of the Colegio de San Juan de Letran Calamba.

In 2008, he was again appointed by the Master of the Dominican Order as Rector Magnificus of the University of Santo Tomas (2008–2012).

In 2019, he was appointed president of the Historical Commission for the Cause for Canonization of the Servant of God Darwin Ramos in the Diocese of Cubao by Bishop Honesto F. Ongtioco.

He had received numerous awards for his professional and civic achievements, like the National Book Award in History, the Catholic Authors Award, the Outstanding Manilan Award (1995 and 2011), Kyung Hee University (Korea) Medal of Highest Honor, and the 2012 Outstanding CEO Award in Education.

Fr. de la Rosa has written hundreds of articles and scholarly treatises, some of which has been translated into German and French, or anthologized in international publications. His book "Beginnings of the Filipino Dominicans" won the National Book Award in History in 1991.

Political offices
Preceded by Rolando Ramos Dizon	Chairman of the Commission on Higher Education; 2004–2005	Succeeded by Carlito Puno
Academic offices
Preceded by Fr. Norberto M. Castillo, O.P.	Rector Magnificus of the University of Santo Tomas; 1990–1994, 1994–1998	Succeeded by Fr. Tamerlane R. Lana, O.P.
Preceded by Fr. Ernesto M. Arceo, O.P.	Rector Magnificus of the University of Santo Tomas; 2007–2008 (Acting), 2008–2012	Succeeded by Fr. Herminio V. Dagohoy, O.P.
