= Rector Magnificus of the University of Santo Tomas =

Highest-ranking officer

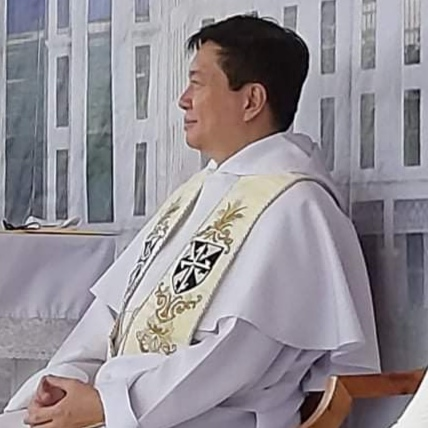
- Incumbent; Richard Ang since 7 May 2020
- Style: His Magnificence
- Member of: Order of Preachers
- Residence: University of Santo Tomas Main Building; Sampaloc, Manila
- Nominator: Members of the Order of Preachers of the University, the Academic Senate, and the Board of Trustees of the University
- Appointer: Congregation for Catholic Education
- Term length: 4 years no term limit
- Constituting instrument: Article 4 of Ex corde Ecclesiae; and Article 10 of the 2014 General Statutes of the University
- Inaugural holder: Domingo González
- Formation: ca. 1612

The Rector Magnificus of the University of Santo Tomas (pl. rectores magnifici) is the highest-ranking officer and chief administrator of the University of Santo Tomas (UST), the oldest and the largest Catholic university in Manila, Philippines. The rector typically sits as chief executive and chair of the university board of trustees. He exercises policy-making as well as general academic, managerial, and religious functions over all university academic and non-academic staff. His term lasts for four years and he is qualified for re-election for two or more terms.

In theory, the highest official of the university is the chancellor, but his role is largely ceremonial and he does not exercise authority over the day-to-day operations of the university. The current Master of the Order of Preachers is the ex officio chancellor of the university and the Prior Provincial of the Dominican Province in the Philippines serves as his de facto vice.

The incumbent rector is the Very Rev. Fr. Richard G. Ang, OP.

== Selection process ==
=== Eligibility ===
Since the establishment of UST in 1611, in order to serve as Rector Magnificus of the university, one must be:

- a member of the Order of Preachers;
- a professor; and
- a holder of a Doctorate degree (Normally, and in most cases a sacred theology or canon law holder).

=== Election ===
==== Early years ====
During the early years of UST, the selection of new rector took place during the elective chapters meetings which were formally assembled in every two years. These board meetings were constituted by the different superiors of the Dominican houses throughout the Philippines. Among themselves, the heads of the Dominican convents then nominate their three candidates. The list of three candidates selected for rectorship is called a ternia. The ternia shall be then conveyed to the Master General in Rome for his approval once the provincial chapter has generated the list of nominees.

The pontification of the rector magnificus during the eighteenth century was coded by the statute similar to that being used at the University of Mexico during that time.

==== Current method ====
Nowadays, a new rector is being selected by process of election. The outset of the election is the selection of three candidates for rectorship through a secret balloting among the members of Saint Thomas Aquinas Priory in UST. The group shall then communicate with the Vice-Grand Chancellor the list of candidates they had selected. Also the prior of the Dominicans in the Philippines, the Vice-Grand Chancellor will pass the list to the Academic Senate and to the board of trustees. Through this process, rank of preference for the candidates is being determined with their credentials and eligibility being evaluated.

The Board of Trustees will then present decision and recommendations to the Vice-Grand Chancellor for dissemination to the Roman Curia, headed by the Master General. A candidate will be designated by the Master General, who requests the Congregation for Catholic Education in the Vatican City for the required confirmatio and, eventually, for the final approval of the nomination.

Once nothing impedes the nomination (after conducting the usual procedures of inquiry regarding the candidate's merits and suitability), a pertinent rescript is issued by the Congregation for Catholic Education. This document is sent to the Master General of the Order of Preachers, who communicates the act to the competent authorities of the Pontifical and Royal University of Santo Tomas.

This custom of electing rectors, which usually takes three to four months, was observed when UST was bestowed the title of "Pontifical University". This election method was first implemented as Fr. Manuel Arellano, O.P. was elected rector of the university in 1923.

=== Tenure ===
Although records show that tenures lasted two years during the 1600s to the 1800s, the term of office for the university's rector magnificus is four years. He is eligible for re-election for two or more terms.

=== Vacancy ===
Vacancies in the office of the rector may arise under several possible circumstances: death and resignation.

As stated in Article 11 of the General Statutes of UST, an acting assignment applies to a vacant position by which the vice-rector of the university de facto assumes the acting post until the duly appointment of a new rector magnificus.

== Regalia ==
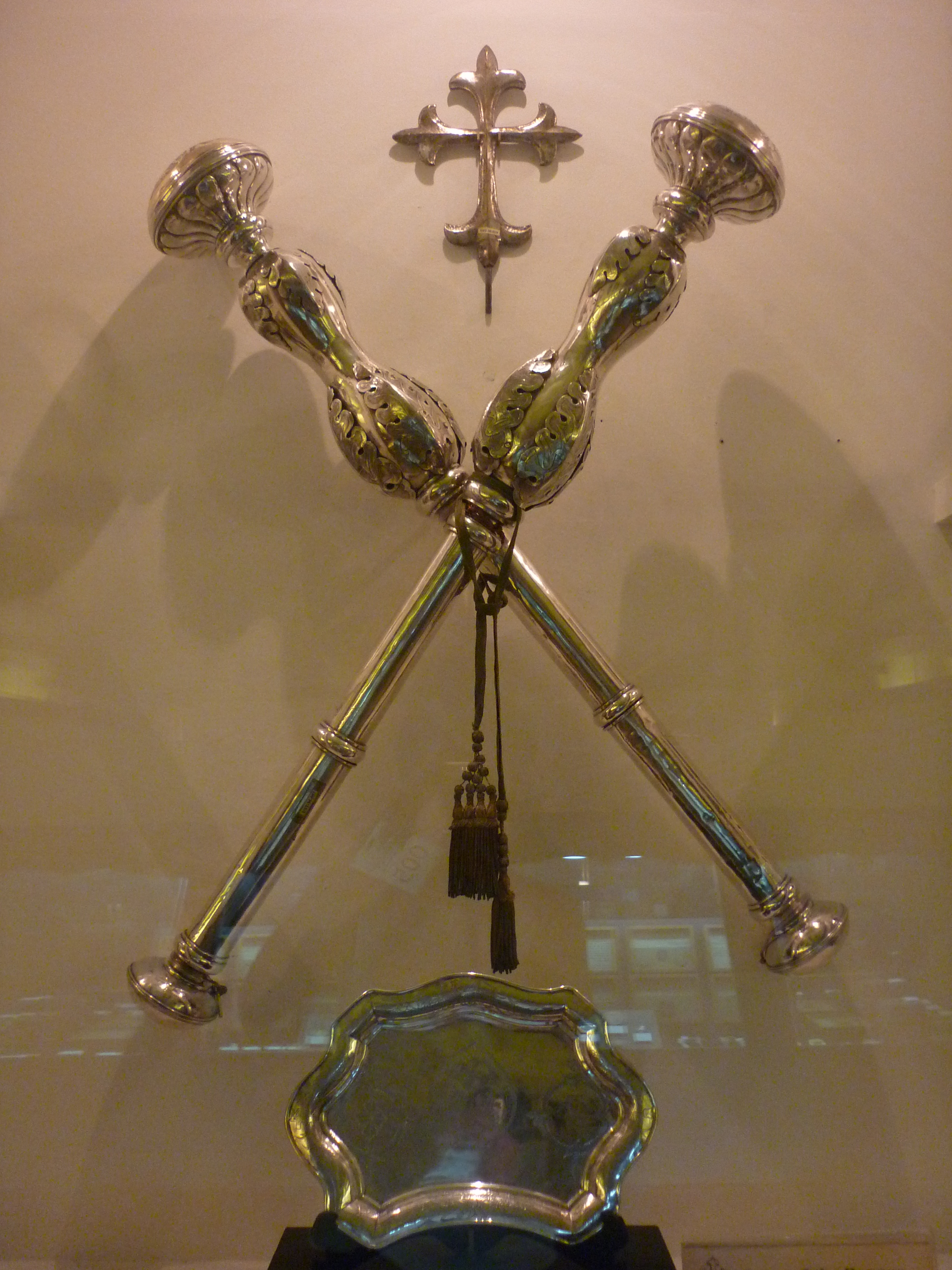
Maces of the rector magnificus

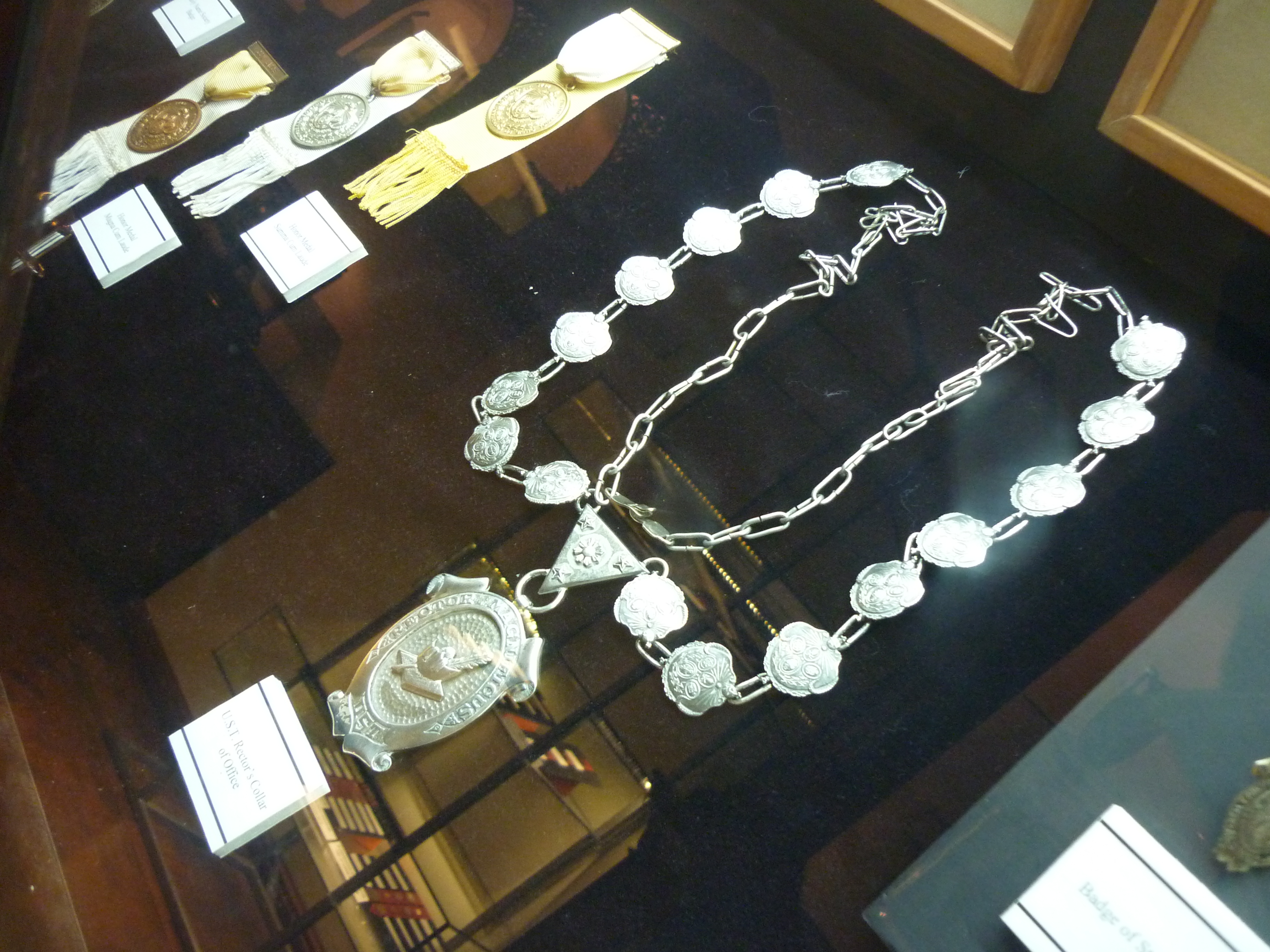
Leonardo Legaspi's collar

=== Collar ===
The collar of the rector signifies the joint powers of the Holy See and the Philippine Government, which collaborate to sustain this historic University. It is also symbolic of the supreme teaching authority of the rector as a professor of the university. The collar was first used during the installation of the first Filipino rector, Archbishop Leonardo Legaspi, O.P., S.Th.D., in 1971. The collar is worn by the Rector above his academic mozetta, which on the other hand is above the black and white Dominican Habit, and is usually seen during his installation and when presiding over solemn investitures.

=== Maces ===
The two maces symbolize the spiritual and temporal powers of the Rector Magnificus as the highest authority of the university. Made of pure silver and measuring 95 x 15 centimetres in diameter, the maces have existed since the 17th century and has been used in academic processions ever since. Candidates for doctoral degrees were accompanied by the Rector in a parade called Paseo de los Doctores from Intramuros to Santo Domingo Church, where University commencement exercises were held until the 17th century.

Today, members of the Academic Senate hold processions at the opening of each academic year and during solemn investitures in academic gowns, following the style of Spanish academic regalia. The maces are borne by bedeles (mace-bearers) and are included in the parade for their academic symbolism.

== List of rectores magnifici ==
Since its foundation in 1611, the University of Santo Tomas has been under the leadership of 110 rectors including acting rectors and double term service. Thirteen of which are rectors prior to its conversion to university status in 1645, and the remaining 97 are university rectors.

Fr. Domingo González, O.P. was the first college rector while Fr. Martin Real de la Cruz, O.P. served as the first university rector and chancellor. The university had acting rectors, whose service lasted for at least one academic year, have been appointed as rector magnificus afterwards, namely: Fr. Francisco Gómez (1714–1716), Fr. Juan Álvarez (1722–1723), Fr. Eugenio Jordan (1944–1948), and Fr. Rolando de la Rosa (2008–2012).

The rector who served the longest term, but not necessarily consecutively, was also the first rector of the then Colegio de Nuestra Señora del Santísimo Rosario, Fr. Domingo González, O.P. He served for four terms, for a total of 15 years. The second longest term, though not consecutively, was held by Fr. Rolando de la Rosa, O.P. who served from 1990 to 1998, and from 2007 to 2012 for a total of 13 years. Meanwhile, it was Fr. Francisco Ayala, O.P. who served the longest consecutive term, his rectorship having lasted for 12 years, from 1829 to 1841.

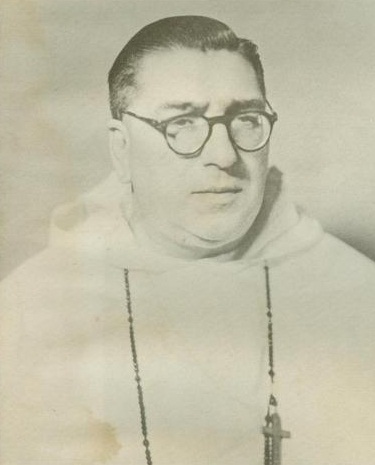
Fr. Silvestre Sancho, O.P. (1936–1941)

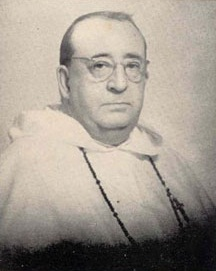
Fr. Eugenio Jordan, O.P. (1941–1944, acting rector; 1944–1948, rector magnificus)

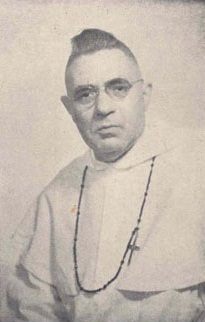
Fr. Angel de Blas, O.P. (1948–1952)

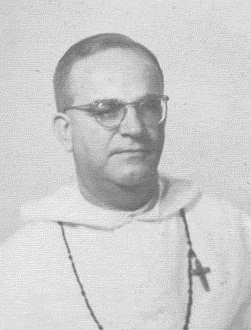
Fr. Jesus Castañon, O.P. (1952–1960)

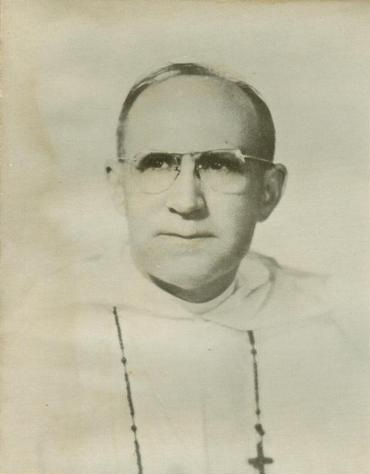
Fr. Ciriaco Pedrosa, O.P. (1960–1961, acting rector)

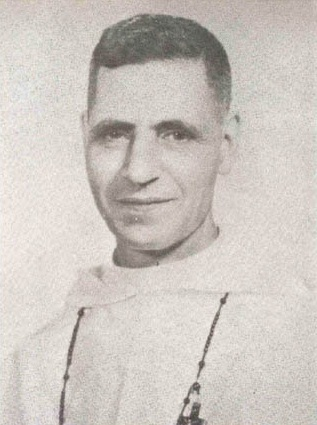
Fr. Juan Labrador, O.P. (1961–1965)

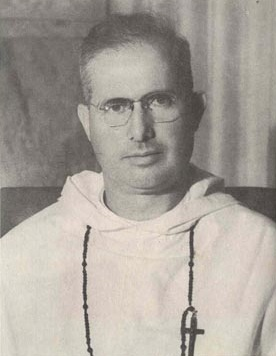
Fr. Jesús Diaz, O.P. (1965–1970)

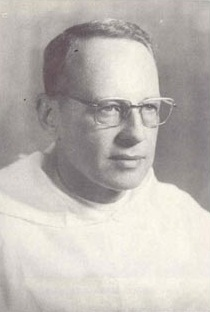
Fr. Frederik Fermin, O.P. (1978–1982)

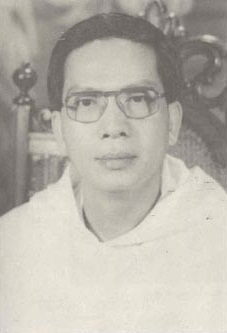
Fr. Norberto Castillo, O.P. (1982–1986; 1986–1990)

Color key:
– Rector without double term service but served for two or more terms
– Rector with double term service and served for three or more terms
– Rector with double term service only
^ – Acting rector
2 – nth term being served at the time

College rectors (April 1611–November 1645)
#	Order	Term	Name
1	1	1612–1616	Fr. Domingo González, O.P.
2	2	1616–1617	Fr. Lorenzo de Porras, O.P.
3	3	1617–1619	Fr. Antonio Gutierrez, O.P.
4	4	1619–1621	Fr. Baltasar Fort, O.P.
5	5	1621–1625	Fr. Tomás de Villar, O.P.
6	6	1625–1626	Fr. Lucas García, O.P.
7	7	1626–1633	Fr. Domingo González, O.P.
8	8	1633–1637	Fr. Francisco de Herrera, O.P.
9	9	1637–1639	Fr. Francisco de Paula, O.P.
10	10	1639–1641	Fr. Domingo González, O.P.
11	11	1641–1643	Fr. Lucas Ruiz de Montanero, O.P.
12	12	1643–1645	Fr. Domingo González, O.P.
13	13	1645–1646	Fr. Francisco de Paula, O.P.

University rectors (November 1645–present)
#	Order	Term	Name
—	—	1646–1648	Fr. Francisco de Paula, O.P.
14	1	1648–1650	Fr. Martin Real de la Cruz, O.P.
15	2	1650–1652	Fr. Jeronimo de Zamora, O.P.
16	3	1652–1654	Fr. Felipe Pardo, O.P.
—	—	1654–1656	Fr. Felipe Pardo, O.P.
17	4	1656–1657	Fr. Francisco de Paula, O.P.
18	5	1657–1659	Fr. Pedro de la Fuente, O.P.
19	6	1659–1661	Fr. Andrés de Haro, O.P.
20	7	1661–1663	Fr. Juan de los Angeles, O.P.
21	8	1663–1665	Fr. Francisco Sánchez, O.P.
22	9	1665–1667	Fr. Diego de San Roman, O.P.
—	—	1667–1669	Fr. Diego de San Roman, O.P.
23	10	1669–1671	Fr. Juan de Paz, O.P.
—	—	1671–1673	Fr. Juan de Paz, O.P.
24	11	1673–1675	Fr. Baltasar de Santa Cruz, O.P.
—	—	1675–1677	Fr. Baltasar de Santa Cruz, O.P.
25	12	1677–1678	Fr. Juan de Paz, O.P.
26	13	1678–1680	Fr. Manuel de Mercadillo, O.P.
—	—	1680–1682	Fr. Manuel de Mercadillo, O.P.
27	14	1682–1684	Fr. Juan de Santa Maria, O.P.
28	15	1684–1686	Fr. Bartolome Marron, O.P.
29	16	1686–1690	Fr. Raimundo Berart, O.P.
—	—	1690–1692	Fr. Raimundo Berart, O.P.
30	17	1692–1694	Fr. José Vila, O.P.
—	—	1694–1696	Fr. José Vila, O.P.
31	18	1696–1698	Fr. Bartolome Marron, O.P.
—	—	1698–1700	Fr. Bartolome Marron, O.P.
32	19	1700–1702	Fr. Juan Ibañez, O.P.
33	20	1702–1706	Fr. Juan de Santa Maria, O.P.
34	21	1706–1710	Fr. Pedro Mejorada, O.P.
35	22	1710–1713	Fr. Francisco Ruiz, O.P.
36	23	1713	Fr. Francisco Gomez, O.P.^
—	—	1714–1716	Fr. Francisco Gomez, O.P.
37	24	1716–1718	Fr. Francisco Barrera, O.P.
38	25	1718–1721	Fr. Cristobal Alonso, O.P.
39	26	1721	Fr. Juan Alvarez, O.P.^
—	—	1722–1723	Fr. Juan Alvarez, O.P.
40	27	1723–1725	Fr. Antonio Varela, O.P.
41	28	1725–1727	Fr. Antonio Argollanes, O.P.
42	29	1727–1729	Fr. Cristobal Alonso, O.P.
43	30	1729–1733	Fr. José Perez, O.P.
44	31	1733–1735	Fr. Tomas Canduela, O.P.
45	32	1735–1737	Fr. Juan de Arechederra, O.P.
46	33	1737–1740	Fr. Diego Saenz, O.P.
47	34	1741–1743	Fr. Vicente de Salazar, O.P.
48	35	1743–1745	Fr. Juan de Arechederra, O.P.
49	36	1745–1747	Fr. Antonio Lavarias, O.P.^
50	37	1747–1751	Fr. Bernardo Ustariz, O.P.
51	38	1751–1753	Fr. Juan Alvarez, O.P.
52	39	1753–1755	Fr. Francisco Carriedo, O.P.
53	40	1755–1757	Fr. Francisco Quintana, O.P.
54	41	1757–1759	Fr. Antonio Calonge, O.P.
55	42	1759–1763	Fr. Diego Serrano, O.P.
56	43	1763–1765	Fr. Joaquin del Rosario, O.P.
57	44	1765–1767	Fr. Miguel Garcia, O.P.
58	45	1767–1769	Fr. Lorenzo Sarroca, O.P.^
59	46	1769–1773	Fr. Joaquin del Rosario, O.P.
60	47	1774–1777	Fr. Juan Fernandez, O.P.
61	48	1777–1785	Fr. Domingo Collantes, O.P.
62	49	1786	Fr. José Muñoz, O.P.
63	50	1786–1789	Fr. Pedro Martir Fernandez, O.P.^
64	51	1789–1794	Fr. Nicolas Cora, O.P.
65	52	1794–1798	Fr. Domingo Bruno, O.P.
66	53	1798–1800	Fr. Antonio Robles, O.P.
67	54	1800–1803	Fr. Francisco Genoves, O.P.
68	55	1806–1810	Fr. José Burrillo, O.P.
69	56	1810–1817	Fr. Francisco Alban, O.P.
70	57	1817–1825	Fr. Carlos Abrea, O.P.
71	58	1825–1826	Fr. Francisco Genoves, O.P.
72	59	1826–1828	Fr. Carlos Abrea, O.P.
73	60	1828–1829	Fr. Francisco de Sales Mora, O.P.
74	61	1829–1841	Fr. Francisco Ayala, O.P.
75	62	1842–1845	Fr. Vicente Ayala, O.P.
76	63	1845–1847	Fr. Juan Ferrando, O.P.
77	64	1847–1849	Fr. José Fuixà, O.P.
78	65	1849–1851	Fr. Vicente Ayala, O.P.
79	66	1851–1855	Fr. Juan Bautista Reig, O.P.
80	67	1855–1863	Fr. Domingo Treserra, O.P.
81	68	1863–1867	Fr. Francisco Rivas, O.P.
82	69	1867–1874	Fr. Domingo Treserra, O.P.
83	70	1874–1878	Fr. Benito Corominas, O.P.
84	71	1878–1880	Fr. Joaquin Fonseca, O.P.
85	72	1880–1881	Fr. Pedro Marcos, O.P.
86	73	1881–1890	Fr. Gregorio Echevarria, O.P.
87	74	1890–1894	Fr. Matias Gomez, O.P.
88	75	1894–1900	Fr. Santiago Paya, O.P.
89	76	1900–1909	Fr. Raimundo Velazquez, O.P.
90	77	1910–1914	Fr. José Noval, O.P.
91	78	1914–1917	Fr. Serapio Tamayo, O.P.
92	79	1917–1923	Fr. Acisclo Alfageme, O.P.
93	80	1923–1926	Fr. Manuel Arellano, O.P.
94	81	1926–1936	Fr. Serapio Tamayo, O.P.
95	82	1936–1941	Fr. Silvestre Sancho, O.P.
96	83	1941–1944	Fr. Eugenio Jordan, O.P.^
—	—	1944–1948	Fr. Eugenio Jordan, O.P.
97	84	1948–1952	Fr. Angel de Blas, O.P.
98	85	1953–1960	Fr. Jesus Castañon, O.P.
99	86	1960–1961	Fr. Ciriaco Pedrosa, O.P.^
100	87	1961–1965	Fr. Juan Labrador, O.P.
101	88	1965–1970	Fr. Jesús Diaz, O.P.
102	89	1971–1977	Fr. Leonardo Legaspi, O.P.
103	90	1978–1982	Fr. Frederik Fermin, O.P.
104	91	1982–1986	Fr. Norberto Castillo, O.P.
—	—	1986–1990	Fr. Norberto Castillo, O.P.
105	92	1990–1994	Fr. Rolando de la Rosa, O.P.
—	—	1994–1998	Fr. Rolando de la Rosa, O.P.
106	93	1998–2002	Fr. Tamerlane Lana, O.P.
—	—	2002–2006	Fr. Tamerlane Lana, O.P.
107	94	2006–2007	Fr. Ernesto Arceo, O.P.
108	95	2007–2008	Fr. Rolando de la Rosa, O.P.^
—	—	2008–2012	Fr. Rolando de la Rosa, O.P.
109	96	2012–2016	Fr. Herminio Dagohoy, O.P.
—	—	2016–2020	Fr. Herminio Dagohoy, O.P.
110	97	2020–2024	Fr. Richard Ang, O.P.
—	—	2024–present	Fr. Richard Ang, O.P.
