= Herminio Dagohoy =

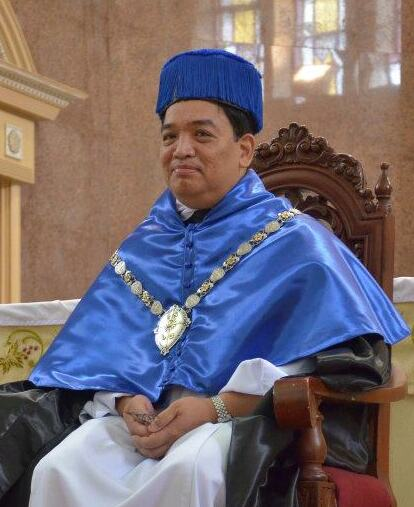

96th Rector Magnificus of the University of Santo Tomas
- In office 2012–2020
- Preceded by: The Rev. Fr. Rolando de la Rosa, O.P., S. Th. D.
- Succeeded by: Very Rev. Fr. Richard Ang, O.P., Ph. D.

9th Rector and President of Angelicum College
- In office June 2004 – June 2008
- Preceded by: The Rev. Hilario Q. Singian Jr. O.P.
- Succeeded by: The Rev. Ferdinand L. Bautista O.P.

Personal details
- Born: July 8, 1964 (age 62) Hagonoy, Bulacan, Philippines
- Education: Polytechnic University of the Philippines; Philippine Dominican Center of Institutional Studies; University of the Philippines Diliman; University of Santo Tomas

Herminio Dagohoy, O.P. (born July 8, 1964) is the 96th Rector Magnificus of the University of Santo Tomas (UST), the oldest and the largest Catholic university in Manila, Philippines.

== Early years and education ==
Dagohoy was born on July 8, 1964, in Hagonoy, Bulacan. He joined the Order of Preachers on May 10, 1988, after finishing Accountancy at the Polytechnic University of the Philippines in 1985. He was ordained to the priesthood on Sept. 28, 1994 at the Santo Domingo Church.

He obtained degrees in philosophy from the Philippine Dominican Center of Institutional Studies in 1990 and Theology at the UST Faculty of Sacred Theology in 1993. He received his MA degree in Philippine Studies from the University of the Philippines Diliman in 2000, a Licentiate in Philosophy at the UST Faculty of Philosophy in 2011, and a PhD degree at UST in 2012.

His areas of specialization include ancient philosophy, theodicy, social philosophy, and hermeneutics. Dagohoy was the former prior of the Santo Domingo Convent in Quezon City and the Priory of St. Thomas Aquinas in UST.

== Career ==
He was the former director for finance and administration of UST Hospital. He also served as the 9th rector and president of Angelicum College in Quezon City. Before his installation as the 96th Rector of the University of Santo Tomas, he served as the prior of the Priory of St. Thomas Aquinas from 2011 to 2012.

Fr. Dagohoy was installed as the 96th Rector of the University of Santo Tomas on June 4, 2012. He served two consecutive terms as Rector Magnificus of the University, from 2012 to 2020.

Academic offices
Preceded by Fr. Rolando dela Rosa, O.P.	Rector Magnificus of the University of Santo Tomas; 2012–2020	Succeeded by Fr. Richard Ang, O.P.
