= University of Santo Tomas–Legazpi =

Roman Catholic university in Albay, Philippines

- Unibersidad ng Santo Tomas–Legazpi (Filipino)
- University seal
- Former names: Legazpi Junior Colleges (1948–1952); Legazpi College (1952–1968); Aquinas University of Legazpi (1968–2017)
- Motto: Vita Veritatis Et Amoris Ex Gratitudine (Latin)
- Motto in English: A Life of Truth and of Love Out of Gratitude
- Type: Private Research Non-profit Basic and Higher education institution
- Established: June 8, 1948 (78 years and 166 days)
- Founder: Buenaventura de Erquiaga
- Religious affiliation: Roman Catholic (Dominican)
Academic affiliations
IFCU PAGE ACUP	CEAP ICUSTA ASEACCU	SEAAIR DOMNET
- President: Edwin A. Lao
- Location: National Highway, Rawis, Legazpi, Albay, Philippines; 13°09′51″N 123°45′00″E
- Campus: Urban; Main Campus Rawis, Legazpi 32 hectares (320,000 m^{2}); Satellite Campus Peñaranda St., Legazpi
- Alma Mater Song: UST–Legazpi Hymn
- Patron Saint: Thomas Aquinas
- Colors: Gold, black, and white
- Nickname: Legazpi Thomasian Tigers
- Mascot: Bengal Tiger
- Website: www.ust-legazpi.edu.ph
- Location in Albay Location in Luzon Location in the Philippines

The University of Santo Tomas–Legazpi, also referred to by its acronym UST–Legazpi, is a private, Catholic basic and higher education institution, and a part of the University of Santo Tomas System that is run and owned by the Philippine Province of the Order of Preachers (OP). It was founded by Buenaventura de Erquiaga in 1948 and named Legazpi Junior Colleges.

UST–Legazpi, despite its name, is an autonomous institution with a university status, separate from the University of Santo Tomas in Manila.

== History ==
Presidents and Rectors
1948–1957	Ramon C. Fernandez
1957–1958	Bienvenido N. Santos
1961–1963	Margarito M. Delgado
1963–1965	Manuel Lacuesta
- As a university
1965–1978	Ramon C. Salinas
1978–1984	Manuel T. Piñon
1985–1988	Pedro V. Salgado
1988–1992	Patricio A. Apa
1992–1995	Orlando C. Aceron
1995–1999	Virgilio A. Ojoy
1999–2011	Ramonclaro G. Mendez
2011–2024	Ernesto M. Arceo
2024–Present	Edwin A. Lao

=== Integration to the UST System ===
UST Manila rector Herminio Dagohoy approved the renaming of Aquinas University of Legazpi to University of Santo Tomas–Legazpi after the decision was made by the UST Council of Regents in December 2016. An application for a change of name was made with the Securities and Exchange Commission which took effect in academic year 2017–2018.

UST–Legazpi retained the board of trustees of the old Aquinas University as its board of trustees including administrative and fiscal independence from UST in Manila.

== Academics ==
The university offers programs in basic education, undergraduate and graduate studies, and law. Twenty-four undergraduate programs are offered in the university's 4 colleges, namely the College of Arts, Sciences, and Education (CASE), the College of Health Sciences (CHS), the College of Engineering, Architecture, and Fine Arts (CEAFA), and the College of Business Management and Accountancy (CBMA).

UST–Legazpi College of Law is the first and oldest law school in Albay. The college produced its first lawyers in 1955. It offers a 4-year Juris Doctor (JD) program. Mae Diane Azores, an alumna of the college, topped the 2019 Philippine Bar Examinations.

The Graduate School offers 8 masters programs and 4 doctorate programs in the fields of law, business and finance, government and public service, ecclesiastical leadership and education, nursing, social work, and psychology. The Master of Arts in Education (MAEd) and Master in Business Administration (MBA) are PACUCOA Level III accredited programs.

== Notable alumni ==
- Noel E. Rosal, the incumbent Governor of Albay, and previously served as Mayor of Legazpi City, Albay. Rosal obtained his master's degree in business administration from Aquinas University.
- Merlinda Bobis, a contemporary Philippine-Australian writer and academic.
