= Richard Ang =

Filipino priest

His Magnificence The Very Reverend Richard Ang
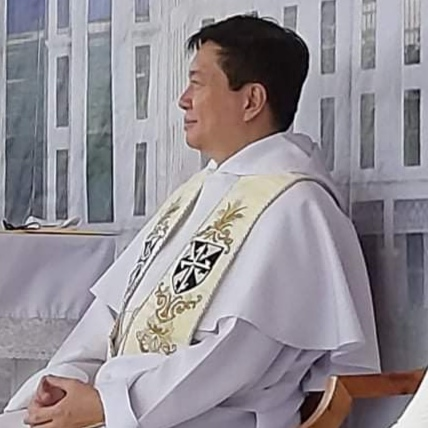
- Ang at the UST General Santos City topping off ceremony

97th Rector Magnificus of the University of Santo Tomas
- Incumbent
- Assumed office May 7, 2020
- Preceded by: Herminio Dagohoy

Personal details
- Born: January 30, 1968 (age 58) Philippines
- Education: University of Santo Tomas

Richard G. Ang, O.P. (born January 30, 1968) is a Filipino priest, divinity scholar, and educational administrator. He is the 97th Rector Magnificus of the University of Santo Tomas (UST), the oldest and the largest Catholic university in Manila, Philippines. He is the eighth Filipino to become rector of the pontifical university.

== Education ==
Ang is an alumnus of the Faculty of Arts and Letters, graduating with a Bachelor of Arts in Philosophy in 1990. He finished his degree in Sacred Theology in 1997, and his Master of Arts in Theology in 1999 from the University of Santo Tomas Faculties of Ecclesiastical Studies. He graduated from the University of Santo Tomas Graduate School with a Doctor of Philosophy degree in 2010.

== Career ==
He was ordained into priesthood in 1998 with the Dominican order. He was a full-time professor and was promoted to become Dean of one of the university's oldest schools - the Faculty of Philosophy.

Ang was Vice Rector of the University of Santo Tomas from 2012 and had become acting rector of the university upon the end of the term of Herminio Dagohoy.

After topping the elections of the Academic Senate from a terna, Ang's name was formally nominated by Master General Very Reverend Father Gerard Timoner III to the Holy See. Ang's official appointment as Rector Magnificus came after securing papal approval from the Vatican through the Congregation for Catholic Education led by Cardinal Prefect Giuseppe Versaldi and Monsignor Angelo Vincenzo Zani. His first term as Rector lasted from April 2020 to April 2024, with Fr. Filemon I. Dela Cruz Jr, OP, installing him on May 13, 2021.

In July 2024, Ang was reappointed by Fr. Gerard Timoner III to a second four-year term. Archbishop José Tolentino de Mendonça, the prefect of the Dicastery for Culture and Education issued the “nihil obstat” declaration, in line with University of Santo Tomas' statutes (art. X), with the Holy See's approval. He was installed on September 9, 2024 at the Santísimo Rosario Parish by Rev. Fr. Filemon I. Dela Cruz Jr. OP, Prior Provincial of the Dominican Province of the Philippines and University Vice-Chancellor. During the appointment process, Fr. Isaias Tiongco, O.P. served as acting rector from May to July 2024.

Academic offices
Preceded by Fr. Herminio Dagohoy, O.P.	Rector Magnificus of the University of Santo Tomas; 2020–present	Incumbent
