= Ferdinand Topacio =

Filipino lawyer (born 1965)

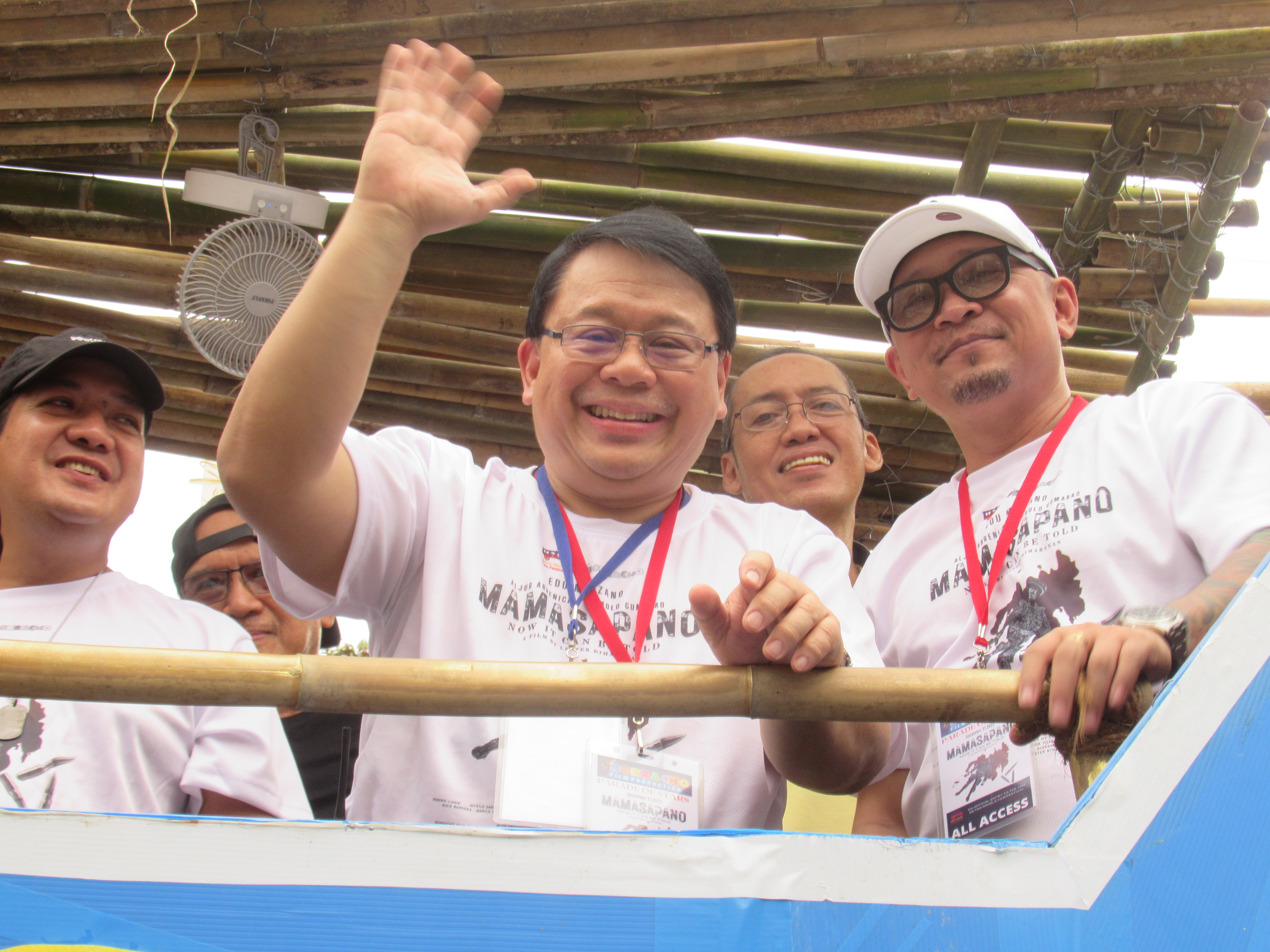
- Topacio at the 48th Metro Manila Film Festival Festival Parade of Stars
- Born: Ferdinand Sumague Topacio; November 9, 1965 (age 60); Cavite City, Cavite, Philippines
- Education: San Sebastian College – Recoletos de Cavite (BS); University of the East (LLB)
- Occupations: Lawyer; Managing partner; Film producer; Film critic; Jazz vocalist
- Known for: Legal counsel for Gloria Macapagal Arroyo and Jose Miguel Arroyo
- Political party: PDP (2026–present)
- Spouse: Dinnah Cureg Aguila (m. 1997)
- Children: Jose Arturo III (b. 1998); Ferdinand Martin II (b. 2006)
- Relatives: Former Cavite Provincial Board Member Arturo Topacio Jr. (father); Former Imus City Mayor Homer Topacio Saquilayan (cousin); General Licerio Topacio (great-granduncle)

Ferdinand "Ferdie" Sumague Topacio (born November 9, 1965) is a Filipino lawyer, film producer and jazz vocalist. He was a speechwriter to Vice President Salvador Laurel, and had served as legal counsel to Manila Mayor Alfredo Lim, former presidents Gloria Macapagal Arroyo and Joseph Estrada, the families of the victims of the 2015 Mamasapano clash, and POGO businesswoman Cassandra Ong.

== Early life and education ==
Topacio was born on November 9, 1965, in Cavite City, the younger son of former Cavite Senior Provincial Board Member and three-term City Councilor Atty. Arturo M. Topacio Jr. of Imus and Cavite City and of former City Treasury Administrative Officer Belen Sumague-Topacio of Tanauan, Batangas. He was named after Philippine President Ferdinand Marcos, who was elected for his first term, on the day Topacio was born. He graduated with Honors with a Bachelor of Arts degree in English from San Sebastian College-Cavite in 1987. He then enrolled in Ateneo Law School but he finished his Bachelor of Laws (Honorable Mention) at the University of the East in 1992. He passed the Philippine Bar Examination on May 14, 1993.

== Government positions ==
While attending law school, Topacio began his career in the late 1980s at the Office of the Vice President of the Philippines, serving as "special assistant" to Vice President Salvador Laurel that involved drafting his speeches. He has been special legal counsel to the Mayor of Manila (1993–1998), chair of the Manila Athletic Sports Council (1994–98), director in the Office of Media Affairs, Office of the Mayor of Manila, (1998), director in the Office of Public Affairs at the Department of the Interior and Local Government (DILG), (February to December 1998), and later, assistant secretary for Local Government (1999). From 2008 to 2009, he was secretary general of the Chinatown Development Authority of Manila.

== Cases handled ==
Topacio undertakes extensive pro bono publico work: the U.E. Legal Aid Clinic, Katapat Legal Aid (under ABS-CBN), Pasang Masda Jeepney Driver's Organization, head of the legal panel of Volunteers Against Crime and Corruption (VACC), the Sulongbayan Movement and Barangay Youth Against Graft and Corruption (BAYAGCO), and as Chief Legal Counsel of Senior Superintendent Cezar O. Mancao II, principal witness against Sen. Panfilo Lacson in the Dacer-Corbito Double Murder Case. However, he withdrew from the case last July 3, 2012, citing "awkwardness" in his relationship with the Department of Justice after subsequently appearing on behalf of former First Gentleman Jose Miguel Arroyo in a string of cases filed by the government against him. He was Lead Counsel in Marcos v. Manila North Tollways Corporation (MNTC) (G.R. No. 166910)169917), companion case to Francisco v. Toll Regulatory Board, which questioned the constitutionality of the transfer of the Philippine National Construction Corporation toll franchise to a private corporation. He is Lead Counsel for Pasang Masda in Social Justice Movement v. Pilipinas Shell Petroleum, et al., where he succeeded in temporarily halting oil price hike for close to six months and in having the Supreme Court declare that oil companies' books may be subject to audit.

As a defense attorney, he is lead counsel for Jaime Paule, principal witness in the so-called Fertilizer Fund Scam hearings held before the Senate Blue Ribbon Committee in 2009. He was lead defense Counsel for Lope Jimenez, one of the principal accused in the Ruby Rose Barrameda Murder Case, who was consequently excluded from the Information by the Department of Justice. Jimenez, and all accused were subsequently cleared in all charges. He is the lead defense counsel for former Palawan Gov. Joel Reyes in the Ortega Murder Case, which resulted in Reyes' being exonerated. He was under retainer as defense counsel for former Philippine Amusement and Gaming Corporation Chairman Efraim Genuino.

As a public interest lawyer, he was one of the Petitioners in the Supreme Court case of Topacio v. House of Representatives which questioned the so-called "One Hundred Thousand Peso Hocus-Bonus" of Congressmen in 1991, where he succeeded in having the members of the House return their "Christmas bonuses" and obtained a pronouncement from the Supreme Court that such "bonuses" cannot be granted to Congressmen. He was one of the Counsels of the City of Manila in the cases for the closure of nightclubs and beer houses in the Ermita-Malate District in 1992, and in the successful recovery from foreclosure of the historic Manila Metropolitan Theater. He was lead counsel for Camarines Sur Gov. Luis Raymund Villafuerte in the fight to prevent the division of Camarines Sur. Topacio was also the counsel for Lauro Vizconde before the Supreme Court on the prosecution of Hubert Webb, son of former senator Freddie Webb, and others in the prosecution of the so-called Vizconde Massacre after a divided court, acquitted Webb. Topacio and the VACC alleged that there were undue influences brought to there for Webb's acquittal. In 1996, together with lawyers Pete Cuadra, Emigdio Tanjuatco, Alexander Padilla, and Melanio Sta. Maria, he was part of the legal team that defended former President Corazon Aquino and others in a civil case, the so-called Mendiola Massacre. Topacio however, only represented then Manila Mayor, Alfredo Lim. The Regional Trial Court of Quezon City dismissed the suit.

He has also dealt with election issues for former Batangas Gov. Armand C. Sanchez (+), former Palawan Gov. Joel T. Reyes, Negros Occidental Congressmen Jing Paras and Masbate Congressman Antonio Kho, Manila Mayor Alfredo Lim, and other public figures, especially to his distant cousin Homer Saquilayan in relation to the latter's candidacy for Mayor of Imus.

=== Counsel for the Arroyos ===
Topacio is legal counsel for former Philippine President Gloria Macapagal Arroyo and her husband, former Philippine First Gentleman Jose Miguel Arroyo. He first represented Atty. Arroyo in 2011 before the Department of Justice in an electoral sabotage case against Mrs. Arroyo and others, but walked out of the proceedings when he perceived that it was a Kangaroo court. He represented Arroyo in his petition before the Supreme Court asking that Department Circular No. 41 of the Department of Justice be invalidated for being unconstitutional. He also filed a separate case before the Supreme Court questioning the legality of a joint order of the Justice Department and the Commission on Elections creating a joint panel to investigate allegations of poll fraud during the 2004 and 2007 general elections. Department of Justice. Topacio himself paid the 2 million peso bond required by the Supreme Court after it issued a temporary restraining order on November 15, 2011, allowing the former president to leave the country. Atty. Arroyo was subsequently cleared of the charges but the former president was indicted and arrested on November 18, 2011, in her hospital bed not withstanding a Temporary Restraining Order from the Supreme Court. On July 25, 2012, however, she was granted bail by the Trial Court and released from hospital detention at Veterans Memorial Medical Center. Eventually, on December 28, 2018, former President Arroyo, this time represented by Topacio later filed perjury charges against Senator Aquilino Pimintel III, the principal complainant in the Electoral Sobotage case, before the Prosecution Office of Pasay, for the latter's "False Testimony" implicating Arroyo. The case is still pending before the Department of Justice.

After Arroyo was denied the right to depart the country despite the Supreme Court order, Topacio expressed confidence that his client would return to the country if allowed departure, and announced in a televised interview that should Arroyo not return to the Philippines, he would have one of his testicles removed. This remark was widely publicized in media, and commented upon in the social media site Twitter where it "trended" for some time.

In March 2013, Topacio was asked to represent her, before the Supreme Court, in a plunder case filed against her and her son, incumbent Camarines Sur Congressman Dato Arroyo in connection with the Libmanan-Cabusao Dam Project. The case has been dismissed. He also appears for Mrs. Arroyo in a civil suit for damages in connection with the Maguindanao Massacre filed by the heirs of some of the victims thereof, represented by Atty. Harry Roque, in the Quezon City Regional Trial Court. The case was summarily dismissed. He also represented Mrs. Arroyo in a new plunder case against her and Taipan's Andrew Tan and George Yang among others, concerning the Lucky Chinatown in Binondo, Manila before the Ombudsman. The case was thrown out, but the complainants appealed to the Supreme Court.

=== Counsel for Joseph Estrada ===
Topacio has also represented former president Joseph Estrada in fighting a ₱2.9 billion tax assessment made by the Bureau of Internal Revenue, one of the biggest tax impositions against an individual taxpayer in the Philippine history. On November 23, 2015, the Court of Tax Appeals reversed the said assessment saying that the BIR had violated the rights of Estrada when it used documents that were never presented before the court. Up to the present, Topacio continues to be the retained counsel of the Ejercito family and has represented Estrada's son Jake Ejercito in the latter's custody case filed before former girlfriend, Andi Eigenmann, with whom Jake has a daughter. In April 2017, the case ended with the two parties amicably settling their differences in court on July 8, 2017.

== Entertainment industry links ==
Topacio also represented personalities in the entertainment industry. He was counsel of teen star Yasmien Kurdi in a string of sexual harassment cases against another actor Baron Geisler in 2009, and of actress Angelica Jones in her electoral protest for a seat in the Provincial Board of Laguna (1st District) in 2007. On October 11, 2011, the case against Baron Geisler was settled amicably after he publicly apologized to Yasmien Kurdi in a press conference. In January 2013, he served as lawyer of Sarah Lahbati to her case against GMA Network due to her alleged disloyalty with the network. In July 2013, his legal services were also secured by multi-awarded actress Claudine Barretto, dubbed by entertainment press as "The Optimum Star," to represent her in petition for temporary protection order (TPO), permanent protection order (PPO) and custody of her children against her husband, actor Raymart Santiago, before the Marikina Regiona Trial Court.

In 2012, Topacio served as legal counsel to teen actress Bea Binene's charitable foundation and other legal matters. Being deeply involved in showbusiness, Topacio was also romantically linked with many actresses and other celebrities. In 2012, there were talks of a relationship between Binene and Topacio. There after, he was linked to TV5 Artista Academy newbie, Marvelous Alejo. There were also talks of an amorous relationship with model, Denice Cornejo in 2015. Topacio has denied all of these reports. Recently, there were reports of an affair between Topacio and actress/cosplayer, Myrtle Sarrosa. Topacio has refused to comment.

Topacio also represented model, Deniece Cornejo as defense counsel in a serious illegal detention case filed by actor Vhong Navarro against her and other persons involving an incident where Navarro was allegedly mold and detained. On September 16, 2014, upon Topacio's application, Cornejo and co-accused, Cedric Lee and Simon Raz, were granted bail by the Trial Court. The order granting bail was affirmed by the Court of Appeals on October 20, 2017. In July 2014, Topacio assisted Heartthrob Aljur Abrenica in filing a suit against GMA7 to compel the latter to rescind his contract with the studio citing "lack of respect and "mismanagement". On March 10, 2015, however, Topacio withdrew as Abrenica's counsel saying that certain key officials of GMA Artist Center has made their withdrawal a condition for entertaining talks of reconciliation with Mr. Abrenica. Abrenica is now with ABS-CBN Star Magic Artist Management.

== Civic and professional activities ==
Topacio has been a lecturer for continuing legal education courses, at the Mandatory Continuing Legal Education (MCLE) seminars of the Institute for Continuing Legal Education at the Pamantasan ng Lungsod ng Maynila (PLM) and the Ocampo Law Office. He is a Professorial Lecturer in Commercial Law at the New Era University College of Law (June 2010 to 2013).

He is a past president of the Rotary Club of Grace Park, Caloocan (District 3800). He is vice president of the SulongBayan Movement and a lifetime member of the Philippine Constitutional Association (Philconsa) and the Circulo Caviteño, He is the head of the legal panel for the Volunteers Against Crime and Corruption (VACC). and a volunteer Legal Counsel for the Pasang Masda, a nationwide jeepney drivers' organization. He was head of the Katapat Legal Assistance Program and a member of the UE Legal Aid Clinic. He was one of the lead conveners of the People's Movement for Justice (PMJ) in 1998-2000 under Manila Mayor Alfredo Lim, a coalition working for reforms in the country's justice system.

Topacio was a regular columnist of the daily tabloid Dyaryong Pinoy with his column, "On Second Thought". He had a legal advice column in the daily tabloid Commuter Express from 2008 to 2010 and in January 2011. He was a columnist of the tabloids Barako, Banat, and Iskandal, and co-anchored several public affairs shows on radio. Since 2018 up to the present, he has been hosting his own radio show in DWIZ-AM entitled Yes Yes Yo! Topacio! which broadcasts Monday to Friday from 11AM to 12NN.

In business, he was vice president for legal affairs and director of the family-owned Noxelle Properties, Inc., vice president for legal affairs of XRC Resources, Inc., director of Galaxy Cable Corporation, Inc. and Galaxy Corporation (Subic), Inc. Since 2010, he has been the Senior Legal Consultant of Eyespy Detectives and Investigators.

In January 2020, he has been elected to the Board of Directors of Lourdes Tuason de Arroyo Holdings, Inc. LTA Holdings, Inc., the holding company of several closely held corporations owned and controlled by the Arroyo family, He replaced Severo Tuason Jr., who died in the same year. Topacio is the first non-family member to sit in the board. LTA, Inc. is a diversified company that has interests in real estate leasing, health care, power generation and financial services, among others. Topacio also sits as corporate secretary in several companies owned by his clients.

Topacio is a jazz singer. In the 1980s he was the vocalist of the late Eli Saison at the Concourse Lounge at the then Manila Garden Hotel (now Dusit Hotel) in Makati. He was also the featured vocalist at Merk's Place, Pasay Road, Makati every Wednesday from 2008 to 2013. He continues to perform in locales in and around Metro Manila with his band "The Jazz Holes". and has performed at The Rizal Park Hotel, Aruba, Capisce Restaurant, Marco Polo Hotel, Manila Polo Club, The Manila Hotel, and Waterfront Hotel Manila, among other venues.

Together with Bea Binene, he launched the Bea Binene Cares Foundation last December 20, 2011, in Sto. Tomas town in Batangas Province, where 600 children from the poorest communities in the said town were given clothing, toys and food. The foundation is also slated to undertake other projects for 2012, some in coordination with the GMA 7 Kapuso Foundation, mostly with poor children as beneficiaries. On November 6, 2012, the party-list group PASANG MASDA, of which he was the second nominee for a congressional seat, was disqualified by the Commission on Elections (Comelec).

The group appealed the decision to the Supreme Court, which issued a status quo ante order allowing PASANG MASDA to participate in the 2013 elections pending resolution of its petition. It started its campaign on February 14, 2013, in Bacoor, Cavite with a bikini competition to determine the new Miss Pasang Masda in preparation for its nationwide campaign stump.

At present, Topacio is helping the Party List group LADLAD, the world's first ever political party composed of homosexuals and bisexuals headed by Prof. Danton Remoto, in drafting and lobbying for legislation that will grant greater rights for lesbians, gays, bisexuals and transgender people. On April 4, 2013, during a LADLAD fund-raising affair at the Rembrandt Hotel, Topacio was proclaimed by the group's leadership as the country's first "Honorary Gay."

Topacio has been featured in several top-rated magazine and talk shows, among which are Boy Abunda's "Bottomline" and Anthony Taberna's "Tapatan", both on ABS-CBN Channel 2; Jove Francisco's "Anggulo," Vic Agustin's "Cocktails" and Lourd de Veyra's "Wasak," both on Channel 5; And Mel Tiangco's "Powerhouse". The love story of him and his wife has also been dramatized on the show "Wagas" which airs on GMA News Television.

Topacio's latest venture is into film production. Together with several partners, he has formed Borracho Film Production. Its initial venture is a big budgeted feature film based on the true story of the so-called SAF 44 simply entitled Mamasapano, which stars Edu Manzano, Claudine Barretto, Aljur Abrenica, JC De Vera, Allan Paule, Ritz Azul, Gerald Santos, Myrtle Sarrosa and other well known actors and actresses. On November 28, 2020, Borracho Film successfully produced 2012 PBB Teens Grand Winner Myrtle Sarrosa's first major concert, Still Love Me which was streamed online due to the pandemic. While Mamasapano is still filming, Borracho is also producing Claudine Barretto's comeback movie with multi-awarded director, Joel Lamangan at the helm. An upcoming romantic comedy film Spring in Prague is currently in production.

On July 1, 2016, Topacio acted as counsel for the families of the policemen who were victims of the Mamasapano clash, where on January 25, 2015, 44 troopers belonging to the Special Action Force of the Philippine National Police were slain in a chance encounter with Muslim rebels in Maguindanao after a successful operation against terrorist Zulkifli Abdhir (also known as Marwan) On behalf of the families, Topacio filed the first lawsuit on the said date against former President Benigno Aquino III, whose term ended the previous day, for reckless imprudence resulting to multiple homicide. Included in the suit are former generals Getulio Napeñas (then SAF Commander) and the suspended PNP Chief Alan Purisima After reaching the Supreme Court on some technicalities, the victims, through Mayor Benjamin Magalong, tried to reopen the case.

In December 2017, Topacio was instrumental in opening a probe against former President Benigno Aquino III and Department of Health Officials over hundreds of child deaths caused by the "undue haste" in administering Dengvaxia, an untested Dengue Vaccine to almost a million school children. He testified during a Senate hearing on Dengvaxia in detailed irregularities in the funding and mass vaccination of Dengvaxia and accused Aquino, who was also present, of being guilty of plunder. On May 4, 2018, Topacio, in representation of CCW together with CCW President, Diego Magpantay filed a plunder complaint against Aquino and others before the Ombudsman. The case is still pending. Topacio, in 2016, was also the first to bring to the attention of the Office of the Solicitor General and Department of Justice about the existence of witnesses with personal knowledge of a widespread conspiracy to trade drugs involving then Justice Secretary Leila De Lima. Following leads and developing the case with the help of Public Attorney's Office and Chief Public Attorney, Persida Acosta, an investigation was held before the House of Representatives in October 2016. Shortly thereafter, the VACC, represented by Topacio filed several drug charges against De Lima. In February 2017, the Department of Justice filed 3 criminal complaints against De Lima before the Muntinlupa Trial Court.

On March 12, 2026, Topacio had a disciplinary complaint filed against him by Rep. Sarah Elago following the former's remarks about the latter, which were done on March 5, 2026, during the segment "Yes Yes Yo Topacio!" (stylized in capital letters) in DWIZ News. In the segment, Topacio defended Rep. Bong Suntay's statements about Anne Curtis two days prior, noting that Suntay was only against criminalizing thoughts, even sexual thoughts (pagnanasa), and adding that he also once had sexual thoughts when he "smelled Sarah Elago during a DOJ hearing". If the complaint is successful, Topacio may face disbarment for his remarks; despite this, Topacio has remained unfazed about the possibility.

== Personal life ==
Topacio married Dinnah Cureg Aguila of Batangas and Isabela on July 14, 1997. His wife is a judge of the Regional Trial Court in Manila, Branch 42.

He was a member of the Iglesia ni Cristo (INC; English: Church of Christ). He was born and raised Aglipayan before converting to INC.

Topacio had hung in his office wall a portrait of Adolf Hitler, whom he regards as a leader who improved Germany and "one of the most misunderstood historical figures" in the world while denying his role in the Holocaust. but he has clarified however, in a New York Times interview that he does not idolize the late dictator.

A man married to a woman, Topacio says he is an "honorary gay" when asked to clarify about his sexuality and has told that he is okay of being assumed as bakla since there is "nothing wrong on being gay". However, he has used faggot as a slur against then Presidential Communications Development and Strategic Planning Office (PCDSPO) undersecretary Manuel Quezon III in 2012 on his blog.
