= University of the East College of Law =

Law school

Coordinates: 14.6020°N 120.9889°E

College of Law
- Type: Private
- Established: 1950
- Dean: Atty. Viviana M. Paguirigan
- Location: 2219 C.M. Recto Avenue, Sampaloc, Manila, Metro Manila, Philippines

The University of the East College of Law or UE Law is the law school of the University of the East, a private, non-sectarian university in Manila, Philippines.

== History ==
The UE College of Law was established in July 1950.

Dr. Francisco T. Dalupan Sr., then the University President, temporarily assumed the position of the first Dean of the college. Justice Roman Ozaeta, a former Senior Associate Justice of the Supreme Court and Secretary of Justice under Presidents Manuel Roxas and Elpidio Quirino, was appointed Dean in SY 1951–1952. Through rigid discipline, Dean Ozaeta steered the college to an enviable position: enrollment grew and a complete law curriculum was offered, with prominent members of the Bench and Bar as faculty members. He promoted scholarship and encouraged academic proficiency in Law.

Dean Ozaeta was succeeded by Ruperto G. Martin in 1956 and by Rodolfo Palma on July 1, 1966, when Dean Martin was elevated to the Court of Appeals as Associate Justice. When he retired on March 31, 1984, Dean Palma was succeeded by Agustin O. Benitez and later by Celedonio E. Tiongson until the appointment of Dante O. Tinga on April 1, 1989. Dean Tinga was succeeded in turn by former Justice Undersecretary Artemio G. Tuquero on May 1, 1993.

Before he could complete his four-year term, Dean Tuquero was appointed Associate Justice of the Court of Appeals and later on became the Secretary of Justice during the term of former President Joseph Estrada.

Carlos M. Ortega, an authority on Criminal and Remedial Law, took over as Dean on May 2, 1996. Dean Ortega was promoted to the position of Vice President for Academic Affairs effective July 1, 2000. Amado D. Valdez took over as Dean until his appointment as Government Corporate Counsel in April 2001. Justice Reynaldo L. Suarez, former Senior Deputy Court Administrator of the Supreme Court, assumed the deanship from May 16, 2001 to May 16, 2004. Dean Antonio R. Tupaz, a former member of the Batasang Pambansa and Minister of State for Local Government, took over from 2004 to 2006. Dean Valdez was reappointed dean in 2006 and served until 2014 when Mayor Joseph Estrada appointed him as chairman of Pamantasan ng Lungsod ng Maynila.

Dean Willard B. Riano, former Dean of the San Sebastian College – Recoletos College of Law, was then appointed dean in 2015. However, he only served until December 2016, having been selected as an examiner for Remedial Law in the 2017 Bar Examinations. Justice Tinga was yet again called to fill the void left by Dean Riano, serving in the interim from 2017 to 2018. In 2018, former FEU Institute of Law Associate Dean, Atty. Viviana M. Paguirigan, was then appointed as Dean Riano's successor, becoming UE College of Law's first female dean.

== Programs ==
The college has the following programs:

- Juris Doctor (J.D.) - a standard four-year law degree program covering all subjects in the Philippine Bar Examinations.
- Bar Refresher Course (two semesters) - a special review program for law graduates in preparation for the annual Bar Examinations.

== Notable alumni ==
The college has produced the following alumni:

- Justice Lucas P. Bersamin – Ll.B. 1973; Retired Chief Justice of the Supreme Court of the Philippines; 9th Placer, 1973 Bar Exams
- Justice Japar B. Dimaampao – Ll.B. 1987; 191st Associate Justice Of the Supreme Court of the Philippines; professor of law and author
- Virgilio Garcillano – Ll.B. 1974; Commissioner, Commission on Elections
- Alfredo Lim – Ll.B. 1963; former Senator of the Philippines; former Mayor of Manila; former Director of the National Bureau of Investigation; Honoris Causa, Doctor of Laws (2001)
- Romulo Macalintal – Private Practitioner and Election Law Expert
- Justice Rodolfo G. Palattao – Ll.B. 1963; former Dean, Pamantasan ng Lungsod ng Maynila College of Law; former Associate Justice, Sandiganbayan
- Justice Normandie B. Pizarro – Ll.B. 1974; former Associate Justice of the Court of Appeals
- Judge Benjamin Pozon – Judge, Regional Trial Court of Makati; presiding judge who presided over the Subic rape case
- Persida Rueda-Acosta – Ll.B. 1987; Chief Public Attorney of the Philippines; 4th Placer, 1989 Philippine Bar Examinations
- Justice Dante O. Tinga – Ll.B. 1974; retired Associate Justice of the Supreme Court of the Philippines; served as a three-term Congressman of Taguig-Pateros district; former Dean of the University of the East College of Law and Polytechnic University of the Philippines College of Law; 15th Placer, 1974 Bar Exams
- Ferdinand Topacio – Ll.B. 1992; Legal counsel for former First Gentleman Mike Arroyo, husband of former President Gloria Macapagal Arroyo; Managing Partner of the Topacio Law Office
- Amado Valdez – Ll.B. 1969; former Dean, UE College of Law and PLM College of Law; former Chairman, Social Security System

=== Honoris Causa ===
- Ramon Magsaysay – Former President, Republic of the Philippines; Honoris Causa, Doctor of Laws (1957)
- Ferdinand Marcos – Former President, Republic of the Philippines; Honoris Causa, Doctor of Laws (1967)
- Carlos P. Romulo – Filipino diplomat, politician, journalist and author; co-founder of the Boy Scouts of the Philippines; served eight Philippine presidents from President Manuel Quezon to President Ferdinand Marcos as a cabinet member or as the country’s representative to the United States and to the United Nations; Honoris Causa, Doctor of Laws (1969)

== Bar Topnotchers ==
| Year | Topnotcher | Ranking | Rating | Passing rate | Notes | Source |
|---|---|---|---|---|---|---|
| 1954 | Benjamin P. Paulino | 10th Place | 93.0% | 75.17% | 2,409 out of 3,206 | |
| 1956 | Melencio C. Corpuz | 5th Place | 89.15% | 62.60% | 2,283 out of 3,647 | |
| 1963 | Roberto P. Ocampo | 8th Place | 83.05% | 22.26% | 1,213 out of 5,453 | |
| 1964 | Demetrio G. Demetria | 2nd Place | 86.85% | 25.09% | 902 out of 3,596 | |
| 1967 | Basilio H. Alo | 3rd Place | 87.15% | 22.8% | 411 out of 1,803 | |
| 1967 | Douglas R. Cagas | 4th Place | 86.85% | 22.8% | 411 out of 1,803 | |
| 1968 | Antonio B. Panopio | 9th Place | 85.0% | 21.11% | 347 out of 1,643 | |
| 1969 | Nicolas B. Maderazo | 2nd Place | 87.25% | 28.6% | 495 out of 1,731 | |
| 1970 | Kamar M. Boloto | 2nd Place | 86.75% | 27.9% | 491 out of 1,761 | |
| 1973 | Lucas P. Bersamin | 9th Place | 86.3% | 33.84% | 621 out of 1,835 | |
| 1975 | Nicanor B. Padilla Jr. | 1st Place | 86.7% | 35.18% | 686 out of 1,950 | |
| 1975 | Edgardo A. Abinales | 7th Place | 85.3% | 35.18% | 686 out of 1,950 | |
| 1977 | Lowell T. Yap | 2nd Place | 91.85% | 60.56% | 1,038 out of 1,714 | |
| 1977 | Eduardo V. Viloria | 4th Place | 91.35% | 60.56% | 1,038 out of 1,714 | |
| 1978 | Andres S. Santos | 7th Place | 90.025% | 56.93% | 1,076 out of 1,890 | |
| 1983 | Salvador S. Hipolito | 2nd Place | 90.6% | 21.3% | 523 out of 2,455 | |
| 1989 | Persida V. Acosta-Rueda | 4th Place | 85.62% | 21.26% | 639 out of 3,006 | |
| 2019 | Princess Fatima T. Parahiman | 2nd Place | 89.52% | 27.36% | 2,103 out of 7,699 | |

== See also ==
- Associate Justice Dante O. Tinga of the Supreme Court of the Philippines
- Legal education in the Philippines
