= Legal Education Board =

Agency of the Philippine government

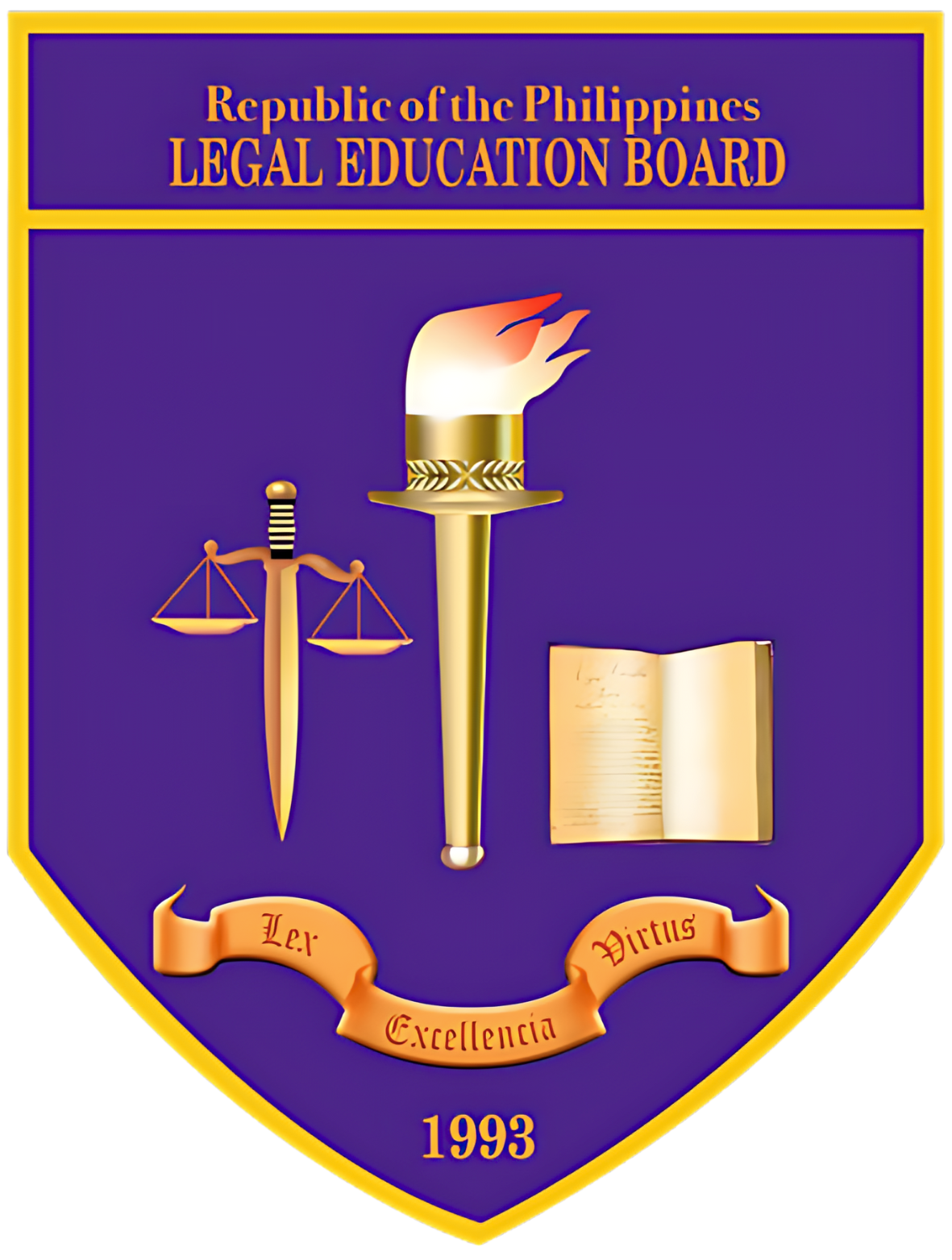
- The Seal of the Legal Education Board (LEB)

Agency overview
- Formed: 23 December 1993 (32 years ago)
- Headquarters: 28th Floor, Upper Class Tower, Quezon Avenue corner Scout Reyes Street, Brgy. Paligsahan, Diliman, Quezon City, Philippines
- Motto: Lex. Excellentia. Virtus. (English: Law. Excellence. Virtue.)
- Agency executive: Jason R. Barlis, Chairperson
- Website: leb.gov.ph

The Legal Education Board, or known widely by its abbreviation LEB, is an independent national government agency responsible for the regulation of the legal education in the Philippines. The agency was created on December 23, 1993 through the enactment of Republic Act No. 7662 or the Legal Education Act of 1993. Currently, the Board is chaired by Jason R. Barlis.

== History ==
Prior to the creation of the Board, the legal education in the Philippines was largely left unsupervised. However, on December 23, 1993, Republic Act No. 7662, or the Legal Education Reform Act of 1993 through the authorship of Senator Edgardo Angara, was created into law. Despite the creation of the Board, it only became operational after 16 years. In 2009, through the efforts of Senator Angara, the Board was given its first operational budget of 10 million pesos. In the same year, former Court of Appeals Associate Justice Hilarion L. Aquino was appointed as its first Chairman. His term was supposedly to end on 2014, but had to occupy his post for two years in a holdover capacity. In 2016, Aquino was replaced by Emerson Aquende, former Law Dean of University of Santo Tomas–Legazpi (formerly known as Aquinas University of Legazpi).

On December 29, 2016, the Legal Education Board issued a memorandum order mandating all aspiring law school students to take the Philippine Law School Admission Test (PhilSAT). The first examination took place in April 2017 across seven key cities in the Philippines.

=== Developments ===
The following were the major changes to the legal education made by the Board since 2009:

- Migration of the basic law degree from Bachelor of Laws to thesis and non-thesis Juris Doctor degrees.
- For purposes of classification, ranking and promotion in non-law degrees or courses, Juris Doctor and Bachelor of Laws degrees were classified as equivalent to professional graduate degrees, regardless if the holder has bar eligibility. Previously, a law degree with bar eligibility was only treated as equivalent to a master's degree.

== Composition ==
The Board is composed of a Chairman, who must preferably a former justice of the Supreme Court or of the Court of Appeals, and four other regular members, each representing the Integrated Bar of the Philippines, Philippine Association of Law Schools, the ranks of active law practitioners and the law students' sector. A representative from the Commission of Higher Education shall also serve as an ex officio member of the Board. With the exception of the representative of the law students' sector, the Chairman and regular members of the Board must be natural-born citizen of the Philippines and members of the Philippine Bar, who have been engaged for at least ten years in the practice of law, as well as in the teaching of law in a duly authorized or recognized law school.

== PhiLSAT ==
Philippine Law School Admission Test
- Acronym: PhiLSAT
- Type: Standardized test
- Administrator: Legal Education Board
- Skills tested: Communications and language proficiency, critical thinking, verbal reasoning, and quantitative reasoning
- Year started: 2017
- Regions: Philippines
- Languages: English
- Fee: P1,000
- Website: www.philsat.com.ph

The Philippine Law School Admission Test, or more popularly known by its acronym PhiLSAT, is a one day standardized aptitude test that was designed to evaluate the academic capability of a person to pursue the potential in the study of law in the Philippines. The standardized test was created pursuant to LEB Memorandum Order No. 7, series of 2016. The tests covers four subtests, namely: communications and language proficiency, critical thinking, verbal reasoning, and quantitative reasoning. The test was first implemented in 1970; it was later reintroduced in 2017 and is given twice a year, on April and on September.

In 2017, two petitions were filed before the Supreme Court: a petition challenging the constitutionality of the Legal Education Board, and the second was a petition challenging the powers of the Board to administer a standardized national test and creating such test as a requirement for law school admission. Oral arguments were held on March 5 and 12, 2019. On March 18, 2019, the Supreme Court issued a temporary restraining order for the implementation of PhiLSAT. The order further conditionally allowed those who have not taken PhiLSAT for the academic year of 2018-2019, those who did not pass the tests in the previous years, those honor graduates with no exemption certificates or with expired exemption certificates to enroll as incoming law students for the upcoming academic year. The said order was effective immediately and shall continue until further orders from the said high court.

== See also ==
- Legal education in the Philippines
- Philippine Bar Examination
- Integrated Bar of the Philippines
- Continuing legal education in the Philippines
