= Legal education in the Philippines =

Legal education in the Philippines is developed and offered by Philippine law schools, supervised by the Legal Education Board. Previously, the Commission on Higher Education supervised the legal education in the Philippines but was replaced by the Legal Education Board since 1993 after the enactment of Republic Act No. 7662 or the Legal Education Reform Act of 1993.

== History ==
The legal education in the Philippines was first introduced during the Spanish occupation when, in 1734, the University of Santo Tomas established the Faculty of Civil Law. In 1899 the First Filipino owned law school was founded, the Escuela De Derecho De Manila, today known as the Manila Law College, by Don Felipe G. Calderon, when he saw the need for a law school which could train Filipino lawyers and provide legal services to the New Republic. After the Malolos Constitution was ratified, the Universidad Literaria de Filipinas was established by Joaquin Gonzalez in 1899; the said institution offered several courses including law. However, the Literaria's existence was short lived as a result of the eruption of the Filipino-American War. During the American occupation, in 1911, the University of the Philippines College of Law was established, through the efforts of George Malcolm, an American lawyer. The said law institution continues to be one of the oldest state colleges of law in the country.

The ratification of the 1935 Constitution paved the way for the establishment of law programs in various private colleges and universities in Manila (schools, at that time, were required to acquire license to operate from the Department of Public Instruction). At that time, there was hardly any kind of supervision of law schools, especially for private institutions. The Faculty of Civil Law of the University of Santo Tomas, the University of the Philippines–College of Law, the former Colegio de Ateneo de Manila and the Philippine Law School were the leading law institutions during those period. After World War II and in the contemporary time, more law schools were then established.

=== Legal Education Board ===
The Legal Education Board supervises all law schools and continuing legal education providers in the Philippines. The board is headed by a chairman who is a retired justice of a collegiate court (i.e., Supreme Court, Court of Appeals, Sandiganbayan, Court of Tax Appeals, etc.). Regular members of the Board include a representative from each of the following:

- Integrated Bar of the Philippines (IBP)
- Philippine Association of Law Schools (PALS)
- Philippine Association of Law Professors (PALP)
- Active law practitioners
- Bona fide law students

The Board has made legal reforms which include—the stricter selection of law students and law professors; improvements in quality of instruction and facilities of law schools; provisions for legal apprenticeship of law students; and the requirement of attendance to continuing legal education seminars for practicing attorneys.

=== Mandatory Continuing Legal Education ===
Lawyers with names appearing in the Rolls of Attorneys of the Supreme Court, unless disbarred, are all members of the Integrated Bar of the Philippines (IBP). However, to be IBP members of good standing, lawyers are required to complete, every three years, at least thirty-six hours of continuing legal education seminars approved by the Mandatory Continuing Legal Education Committee (MCLE). Members who fail to comply shall pay a non-compliance fee, and shall be listed as a delinquent member.

The Mandatory Continuing Legal Education Office, established by the Supreme Court, is the official government agency tasked to implement compliance with the MCLE requirement. The MCLE Office is headed by former Supreme Court Justice Carolina C. Grino-Aquino, widow of former Supreme Court Chief Justice Ramon Aquino. Its office is located at the fourth floor of the IBP Building in Ortigas Center.

== Legal systems ==
The Philippine legal system is an amalgamation of the world's major systems. These systems include Roman civil law which was inherited from Spain; the Anglo-American common law which were derived from the laws of the United States; and Islamic law, otherwise known as the Sharia law, of the Muslim world. Private law and legal codes are substantially patterned after the civil law of Spain, while public law, including political law, is based on the Anglo-American legal system.

== Law degree programs ==
Law degree programs are considered professional/post-baccalaureate programs in the Philippines. As such, admission to law schools requires the completion of a bachelor's degree, with a sufficient number of credits or units in certain subject areas. Completion of a required course from a Philippine law school constitutes the primary eligibility requirement in order to take the Philippine Bar Examination, the national licensure examination as precursor to admission to the practice of law in the country.

Legal education in the Philippines normally proceeds along the following route:

- Undergraduate education (usually 4 years)
- Law school (usually 4 years)
- Admission to the bar (usually by taking a Philippine bar exam)
- Legal practice and mandatory continuing legal education

Law degrees in the Philippines may be classified into three types—professional, graduate level and honorary.

=== Professional law degrees ===
In order to be eligible to take the bar examinations, one must complete the Juris Doctor (J.D.) program, which may be either the non-thesis or thesis course. Advanced degrees are offered by some law schools, but are not requirements for admission to the practice of law in the Philippines.

- Bachelor of Laws (LL.B.) – The LL.B. was the most common law degree offered and conferred by Philippine law schools. It was a standard four-year law program covering all bar exam subjects. Almost all law schools followed a standard LL.B. curriculum, wherein students are exposed to the required bar subjects. Other schools, like the University of the Philippines College of Law, allow students to substitute electives for bar review subjects offered in the fourth year of study. In December 2018, as mandated by LEB, the LL.B. program was phased out and was migrated to the J.D. non-thesis program; such migration applied retroactively to LL.B. degree holders, meaning all LL.B. degree holders were also conferred of the new migrated degree.
- Juris Doctor (J.D.) - The J.D. degree was developed and first conferred in the Philippines by the Ateneo Law School in 1991. The J.D. program is a four-year law program. Like the standard LL.B. program, the J.D. curriculum covers the core subjects required for the bar examinations. Unlike the LL.B., the Ateneo J.D. program requires students to finish the core bar subjects in 2 1/2 years, take elective subjects, undergo an apprenticeship, and prepare and defend a thesis. Currently, the program may be taken either with thesis or that with non-thesis.
  - Juris Doctor–Master of Business Administration, (J.D.-M.B.A.), – The J.D.-M.B.A. program is a double degree program in law and management offered at the professional-graduate level. It was introduced and is so far offered only by the La Salle-FEU MBA-JD Program, a consortium of Far Eastern University Institute of Law and De La Salle Graduate School of Business. Under this program, the requirements of the J.D. and M.B.A. programs are satisfied by the taking of concurrent units of study, allowing students to complete the program in five instead of six years.

=== Graduate law degrees ===
Beyond the J.D. or LL.B., members of the Philippine bar have the option of pursuing graduate degrees in law.

- Master of Laws (LL.M.) – The LL.M. is a graduate law degree offered to holders of basic law degrees (LL.B. and J.D.). It is generally offered to law graduates and lawyers of any nationality. Six Philippine law schools so far conduct the program—the Ateneo Law School, which offers an International Master of Laws program; the University of Santo Tomas Faculty of Civil Law, which first offered the LL.M.; San Sebastian College - Recoletos Graduate School of Law; University of Manila College of Law; Manuel L. Quezon University College of Law; Central Philippine University College of Law in Consortium with San Beda College; San Beda Graduate School of Law; and PLM Graduate School of Law of the Pamantasan ng Lungsod ng Maynila (University of the City of Manila). LL.M. programs were once offered by the Far Eastern University Institute of Law, the Escuela de Derecho de Manila (now Manila Law College Foundation), and the University of the Philippines College of Law but were eventually phased out due to lack of enrollment and funding.
- Doctor of Civil Law (D.C.L.) – The D.C.L. program is a doctoral program in law offered to holders of the LL.M. degree. Candidates who hold only LL.B. degrees may be admitted upon completion of prerequisite LL.M. subjects. The D.C.L. was pioneered by the University of Santo Tomas Faculty of Civil Law. Their program structure is highly similar to the D.C.L. offered in the Complutense University of Madrid. The PLM Graduate School of Law has already opened its own D.C.L. program.
- Doctor of Juridical Science (S.J.D. or J.S.D.) – The S.J.D. or J.S.D. program is currently offered only by the San Beda Graduate School of Law. While the candidate for the degree is required some academic units, the grant of the degree relies on the candidates research output as well as his or her participation in international symposia, seminars and programs as lecturer, panel presenter or paper presenter. The candidate presents a doctoral dissertation that is argued before a Panel of Oral Examiners and then delivers a 'lectio coram' -- a lecture in the presence of legal luminaries.

=== Honorary law degrees ===
Some Philippine universities also confer the honorary Doctor of Laws (LL.D.) degree. It is given to famous individuals who, in the discretion of the awarding institution, were found to have made significant contributions to a certain field, or to the improvement of society or development of the conditions of mankind in general.

=== Ecclesiastical law degrees ===
A few Roman Catholic seminaries and graduate schools offer degree programs in canon law, an ecclesiastical program that is not required in the Philippine Bar Examinations. The University of Santo Tomas Faculty of Canon Law runs the oldest academic programs of this kind. Its Licentiate of Canon Law (J.C.L.) and Doctor of Canon Law (J.C.D.) programs are open to priests, nuns, theologians, and even to lay people (i.e., trial court judges, law deans, family lawyers etc.). Judges of the Roman Catholic Marriage Tribunal typically hold academic degrees in the field. Degrees in canon law, strictly speaking, are not considered law degrees in the Philippines.

== Admission to the practice of law ==
The 1987 Constitution of the Philippines has given the Supreme Court the sole power to admit individuals to the practice of law in the Philippines. This power is exercised through a Bar Examination Committee, an ad hoc academic group tasked to formulate questions, administer proceedings, grade examinations, rank candidates, and release the results of the Philippine Bar Examination.

To be eligible to take the national bar exam, a candidate must be a Filipino citizen, at least twenty-one years of age, and holder of a bachelor's degree and a law degree obtained from a government recognized law school in the Philippines. Graduates of law schools from other countries must obtain a law degree from the Philippines to qualify for the Philippine Bar. In March 2010 the Supreme court issued Bar matter 1153 allowing Filipino who are foreign law graduates to take the Bar exam provided that applicant complies with the following conditions:

1. completion of all courses leading to the degree of Bachelor of Laws or its equivalent degree;
2. recognition or accreditation of the law school by the proper authority;
3. completion of all fourth year subjects in the Bachelor of Laws academic program in a law school duly recognized by the Philippine Government; and
4. must have completed a separate bachelor's degree."

=== Bar examinations ===
The Philippine Bar Examinations is the national licensure exam for admission to the practice of law. It is conducted during the four Sundays of September, or October, or November of every year. It is arguably the hardest and the most media-covered of all government licensure examinations in the country. It is also reputedly one of the hardest bar examinations in the world.

For candidates intending to practice Islamic law in the Philippines, the Special Bar Exams for Shari'a Court Lawyers is given every two years. The Supreme Court Bar Office conducts the exam while the Office of Muslim Affairs determines the qualification and eligibility of candidates to the exams.

=== Attorneys-at-law ===
To be a full-fledged lawyer in the Philippines and be eligible to use the title Attorney, a candidate must graduate from a Philippine law school, take and pass the Philippine Bar Examinations, the candidate who passed the bar examinations is entitled to take and subscribe before the Supreme Court special en banc session the corresponding Revised Lawyer's Oath, as follows:

I,_______________, do solemnly swear (affirm) that I accept the honor, privilege, duty, and responsibility of practicing law in the Philippines as an Officer of the Court in the interest of our people.

I declare fealty to the Constitution of the Republic of the Philippines.

In doing so, I shall work towards promoting rule of law and a regime of truth, justice, freedom, love, equality, and peace.

I shall conscientiously and courageously work for justice, as well as safeguard the rights and meaningful freedoms of all persons, identities, and communities. I shall ensure greater and equitable access to justice. I shall do no falsehood nor shall I pervert the law to unjustly favor nor prejudice anyone. I shall faithfully discharge these duties and responsibilities to the best of my ability, with integrity, and utmost civility. I impose all these upon myself without mental reservation nor purpose of evasion.

So help me, God. (Omit for affirmations)

The certificate to practice law will be granted by the Supreme Court after the lawyer sign his name in the Rolls of Attorneys of the Supreme Court. The full names of lawyers are found in the Rolls of Attorneys of the Supreme Court, and in a similar list included in a Supreme Court publication entitled Law List.

== Philippine law schools ==
Starting from 2017, the Legal Education Board had started implementing the Philippine Law School Admission Test (PhilSAT); the failure to pass such admission test prohibits a person from enrolling to any law schools in the Philippines. It is a one-day aptitude test intended to measure the academic potential of an examinee who wishes to pursue the study of law.

As of 2017, there are 108 law schools legitimately operating throughout the Philippines. These include independent law schools. Satellite campuses are omitted as they are considered part of a larger higher education institution.

=== Top performing schools ===
The following schools are the top performing law schools in the Philippines, based on the cumulative results of the bar examinations from 2018 to 2024.

1. Ateneo de Manila University (93.60%)
2. Ateneo de Davao University (92.79%)
3. University of the Philippines (91.52%)
4. San Beda University (89.66%)
5. University of San Carlos (86.54%)
6. University of Santo Tomas (83.48%)
7. Polytechnic University of the Philippines (82.38%)
8. St. Louis University (81.21%)
9. Angeles University Foundation (80.13%)
10. Xavier University - Ateneo de Cagayan (78.65%)

The ranking does not account for the number of candidates from each law school except to determine which schools were ranked. This differs from annual Supreme Court data, which brackets law schools based on the number of candidates that participate. For the 2024 bar examination results, the Supreme Court categorized law schools as those sending over 100 candidates, 51-100 candidates, 11-50 candidates, and 10 or fewer candidates, with the following results:For schools with more than 100 test-takers, the complete rankings are:

1. Ateneo de Manila University (96.02%, 169/176)
2. University of the Philippines (90.51%, 229/253)
3. San Beda University (89.73%, 131/146)
4. University of Santo Tomas - Manila (80.35%, 139/173)
5. University of San Carlos (79.05%, 117/148)

For schools with 51-100 examinees:

1. Ateneo de Davao University (94.55%, 52/55)
2. Pamantasan ng Lungsod ng Maynila (83.58%, 56/67)
3. Polytechnic University of the Philippines (75.95%, 60/79)
4. Saint Louis University (74.60%, 47/63)
5. University of Cebu (74.32%, 55/74)

For schools with 11-50 examinees:

1. West Visayas State University (92.31%, 12/13)
2. University of Makati (90.91%, 20/22)
3. University of Asia and the Pacific (87.50%, 21/24)
4. Angeles University Foundation School of Law (84.38%, 27/32)
5. Notre Dame of Marbel University (78.57%, 11/14)

For schools with 1-10 examinees:

1. North Eastern Mindanao State University (100%, 4/4), Saint Columban College (100%, 5/5) and Our Lady of Mercy College (100%, 1/1)
2. Mariano Marcos State University (90%, 9/10)
3. Batangas State University (71.43%, 5/7)
4. Manila Adventist College (44.44%, 4/9)
5. Tomas Claudio College (40%, 4/10) and St. Mary's College of Tagum, Inc. (40%, 2/5)

Out of 142 law schools that participated in the 2024 Bar Examinations, 130 produced successful examinees.

=== Metro Manila ===
- Adamson University (Ermita, Manila)
- Arellano University (Pasay)
- Ateneo de Manila University (Makati)
- Centro Escolar University (Makati)
- City University of Pasay (Pasay)
- De La Salle University (Taguig)
- Far Eastern University (Makati)
- José Rizal University (Mandaluyong)
- Lyceum of Alabang (Muntinlupa)
- Lyceum of the Philippines University (Makati)
- Manila Adventist College (Pasay)
- Manila Law College (formerly Escuela de Derecho) (Sta. Cruz, Manila)
- Manuel L. Quezon University (Quiapo, Manila)
- New Era University (Diliman, Quezon City)
- Pamantasan ng Lungsod ng Maynila (Intramuros, Manila)
- Philippine Christian University (Manila)
- Philippine Law School (Pasay)
- Polytechnic University of the Philippines (Manila)
- St. Dominic Savio College (Caloocan)
- San Beda University (San Miguel, Manila)
- San Beda College Alabang (Muntinlupa)
- San Sebastian College–Recoletos (Manila)
- Universidad de Manila (Manila)
- University of Asia and the Pacific (Pasig)
- University of Caloocan City (Caloocan)
- University of the East (Manila)
- University of Makati (Makati)
- University of Manila (Sampaloc, Manila)
- University of Perpetual Help System DALTA (Las Piñas)
- University of Santo Tomas (Sampaloc, Manila)
- University of the Philippines Diliman (Quezon City and Taguig City)

=== Central Luzon ===
- Aurora State College of Technology (Baler, Aurora)
- Angeles University Foundation (Angeles City)
- Araullo University (Cabanatuan, Nueva Ecija)
- Bataan Peninsula State University (Balanga, Bataan)
- Baliuag University (Baliuag, Bulacan)
- Bulacan State University (Malolos, Bulacan)
- Pampanga State University (Bacolor, Pampanga)
- Jesus Is Lord Colleges Foundation (Bocaue, Bulacan)
- Tarlac State University (Tarlac City, Tarlac)
- Wesleyan University Philippines (Cabanatuan, Nueva Ecija)

=== Northern Luzon ===
- Abra Valley Colleges (Bangued, Abra)
- Cagayan State University (Tuguegarao)
- Cordillera Career Development College (La Trinidad, Benguet)
- Don Mariano Marcos Memorial State University (San Fernando, La Union)
- Isabela State University - Cauayan City Campus (Cauayan, Isabela)
- Kalinga State University (Tabuk, Kalinga)
- Lyceum-Northwestern University (Dagupan)
- Mariano Marcos State University (Batac, Ilocos Norte)
- Northeastern College (Santiago, Isabela)
- Northwestern University (Laoag)
- Panpacific University (Urdaneta, Pangasinan)
- Saint Louis College (San Fernando, La Union)
- Saint Louis University (Baguio)
- Saint Mary's University (Bayombong, Nueva Vizcaya)
- University of Baguio (Baguio)
- University of Cagayan Valley (Tuguegarao)
- University of the Cordilleras (Baguio)
- University of La Salette (Dubinan East, Santiago)
- University of Northern Philippines (Vigan)
- University of Pangasinan (Dagupan)
- Urdaneta City University (Urdaneta, Pangasinan)
- Virgen Milagrosa University Foundation (San Carlos, Pangasinan)

=== Calabarzon ===
- Batangas State University (Batangas City)
- Cainta Catholic College (Cainta, Rizal)
- De La Salle Lipa (Lipa, Batangas)
- De La Salle University – Dasmariñas (Dasmariñas, Cavite)
- Emilio Aguinaldo College – Cavite (Dasmariñas, Cavite)
- Enverga University (Lucena)
- Laguna State Polytechnic University (Santa Cruz, Laguna)
- Philippine Christian University – Dasmariñas (Dasmariñas, Cavite)
- San Pablo Colleges (San Pablo, Laguna)
- Tomas Claudio Colleges (Morong, Rizal)
- University of Batangas (Batangas City)
- University of Perpetual Help System JONELTA (Biñan, Laguna)
- Western Colleges (Naic, Cavite)

=== Southern Luzon ===
- Aemilianum College (Sorsogon City)
- Ateneo de Naga University (Naga City)
- Bicol College (Daraga, Albay)
- Bicol University (Legazpi, Albay)
- Camarines Norte School of Law (Talisay, Camarines Norte)
- Liceo de Masbate Colleges (Masbate City)
- Divine World College of Calapan (Calapan, Mindoro Oriental)
- Luna Goco Colleges (Calapan, Oriental Mindoro)
- Our Lady of Lourdes College Foundation (Daet, Camarines Norte)
- Palawan State University (Puerto Princesa)
- Southern Bicol Colleges (Masbate City)
- Tabaco College (Tabaco, Albay)
- University of Northeastern Philippines (Iriga, Camarines Sur)
- University of Nueva Caceres (Naga City)
- University of Santo Tomas - Legazpi (Legazpi, Albay)

=== Visayas ===
- Aklan Catholic College (Kalibo, Aklan)
- Asian Development Foundation College (Tacloban City)
- Biliran Province State University (Naval, Biliran)
- BIT International College (Tagbilaran, Bohol)
- Cebu Normal University (Cebu City)
- Central Philippine University (Jaro, Iloilo City)
- Christ the King College (Calbayog)
- Colegio dela Purisima Concepcion (Roxas, Capiz)
- College of Maasin (Maasin, Southern Leyte)
- Dr. Vicente Orestes Romualdez Educational Foundation (Tacloban City)
- Eastern Samar State University (Borongan, Eastern Samar)
- Foundation University (Dumaguete, Negros Oriental)
- Garcia Law School (Talibon, Bohol)
- Holy Name University (Tagbilaran, Bohol)
- Leyte Colleges (Tacloban, City)
- Negros Oriental State University (Dumaguete, Negros Oriental)
- Saint Paul School of Professional Studies (Palo, Leyte)
- Santo Niño Mactan College (Lapulapu City)
- Silliman University (Dumaguete, Negros Oriental)
- Southwestern University (Sambag District, Cebu City)
- University of Bohol (Tagbilaran, Bohol)
- University of Cebu (Cebu City)
- University of Eastern Philippines (Catarman, Northern Samar)
- University of Negros Occidental-Recoletos (Bacolod City)
- University of San Agustin (Iloilo City)
- University of San Carlos (Cebu City)
- University of San Jose-Recoletos (Cebu City)
- University of St. La Salle (Bacolod City)
- University of Southern Philippines Foundation (Cebu City)
- University of the Visayas (Cebu City)
- Western Leyte College (Ormoc, Leyte)
- West Visayas State University (La Paz, Iloilo City)

=== Mindanao ===
- Andres Bonifacio College (Dipolog)
- Ateneo de Davao University (Davao City)
- Ateneo de Zamboanga University (Zamboanga City)
- Basilan State University (Isabela, Basilan)
- Bukidnon State University (Malaybalay, Bukidnon)
- Cor Jesu College (Digos, Davao del Sur)
- Cotabato State University (Cotabato City)
- DMC-College Foundation (Dipolog)
- Fr. Saturnino Urios University (Butuan)
- J.H. Cerilles State College (San Miguel, Zamboanga del Sur)
- Jose Maria College (Davao City)
- Jose Rizal Memorial State University (Dapitan City)
- La Salle University – Ozamiz (Ozamiz, Misamis Occidental)
- Liceo de Cagayan University (Cagayan de Oro)
- Medina College-Ozamiz (Ozamiz, Misamis Occidental)
- Mindanao State University–General Santos City (General Santos City)
- Mindanao State University–Iligan Institute of Technology (Iligan)
- Misamis University (Ozamiz, Misamis Occidental)
- Notre Dame of Marbel University (Koronadal, South Cotabato)
- North Eastern Mindanao State University (Tandag, Surigao del Sur)
- Pagadian Capitol College (Pagadian, Zamboanga del Sur)
- Rizal Memorial Colleges (Davao City)
- Sultan Kudarat State University (Tacurong City)
- Saint Columban College (Pagadian, Zamboanga del Sur)
- St. Thomas More School of Law & Business (Tagum)
- St. Mary's College of Tagum (Tagum)
- University of Mindanao (Davao City)
- University of Southeastern Philippines (Davao City)
- University of Southern Mindanao (Kidapawan, Cotabato)
- Xavier University (Cagayan de Oro City)
- Western Mindanao State University (Zamboanga City)

=== Bangsamoro ===
- Cotabato State University (Cotabato City)
- Mindanao State University (Marawi)
- Notre Dame University (Cotabato City)
