= J. B. L. Reyes =

Filipino jurist (1902–1994)

The Honorable J. B. L. Reyes
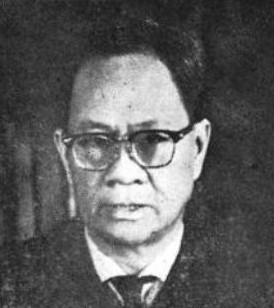

64th Associate Justice of the Supreme Court of the Philippines
- In office June 30, 1954 – August 19, 1972
- Appointed by: Ramon Magsaysay
- Preceded by: Ramón Diokno
- Succeeded by: Estanislao Fernandez

Vice-Chairman of the Presidential Committee on Human Rights
- In office 1986 – January 1987

Personal details
- Born: Jose Benedicto Luis Luna Reyes; August 19, 1902 Manila, Philippine Islands
- Died: December 27, 1994 (aged 92) Quezon City, Philippines
- Resting place: Loyola Memorial Park
- Spouse: Rosario L. Reyes
- Children: 3
- Education: Ateneo de Manila University (BA); University of the Philippines (LL.B.); Complutense University of Madrid (LL.M.); University of Santo Tomas (JD)
- Profession: Lawyer
- Nickname: J.B.L.

Jose Benedicto Luis Luna Reyes (August 19, 1902 – December 27, 1994) was a Filipino jurist who served as an Associate Justice of the Supreme Court from 1954 to 1972.

After his retirement, Reyes became the first president of the Integrated Bar of the Philippines (IBP). He also worked with Sen. Lorenzo Tanada and José W. Diokno in groups such as the Free Legal Assistance Group (FLAG) and the Anti-Bases Coalition. He was also a highly regarded legal scholar in the field of civil law.

== Early life and education ==
Reyes was born in Manila to Dr. Ricardo Albino Reyes and Marcia Concepcion Luna. By the age of 15, he had earned his Bachelor of Arts degree, magna cum laude, at the Ateneo de Manila University. He obtained his law degree from the University of the Philippines in 1922, and passed the bar examinations of that year, placing 6th. He was not allowed admission to the Philippine Bar until the following year, when he reached his 21st birthday. Reyes would later pursue special legal studies at the Complutense University of Madrid in 1929 and masteral studies in law at the University of Santo Tomas thereafter.

== Legal career ==
In the 1930s, Reyes was a law professor at the University of the Philippines and at the Far Eastern University. As early as then, he was earning esteem in the legal academe, and even abroad, particularly in the field of civil law. His dean at the U.P. College of Law, Jorge Bocobo, remarked that Reyes was among of two Filipinos rated as outstanding civilists in Spain.

As a private practitioner, Reyes was among the founders of the Civil Liberties Union in 1937. His association with that group helped foster his lifelong reputation as a civil libertarian and an ardent nationalist. Within weeks after the Japanese invasion in 1941, Reyes helped organize the underground Free Philippines movement. His involvement with the resistance was soon exposed, and he was imprisoned by the Japanese in Fort Santiago in 1944. Unlike some of the other founders of the Free Philippines movement, such as Rafael Roces, Jr. and Antonio Bautista, Reyes was spared execution, though not torture.

After the war, Reyes was appointed to the Court of Appeals. He also helped found in 1947 the Manuel L. Quezon University, and joined its law faculty. When the Civil Code was enacted, Reyes, who had briefly served on the Code Commission before the war, published widely read article outlining his criticisms of several articles. That article has since been cited favorably in a number of Supreme Court decisions.

== Associate Justice of the Supreme Court ==
After nine years with the Court of Appeals, Reyes was appointed to the Supreme Court in 1954 by President Ramon Magsaysay. At 52, he was among the youngest justices appointed to the Court. However, Reyes would never get to serve as Chief Justice. This was in part because his close friend Roberto Concepcion, several months his junior, was appointed to the Court a few months before Reyes. Concepcion was named Chief Justice in 1966.

During his tenure on the Court, Reyes and Claro M. Recto were unsuccessfully nominated to the International Court of Justice.

In his 18 years on the Court, Reyes grew in prominence unlike few other Supreme Court magistrates before and since. Often, especially on matters relating to his specialty, civil law, his opinions proved to be the final word. In some quarters, he was called "the Court", in tribute to the considerable influence he wielded over his colleagues. Upon his retirement in 1972, one of his colleagues, the future Chief Justice Felix Makasiar, said of Reyes that "[n]o jurist within living memory has commanded during the last quarter of a century, the deep respect and admiration of the bench and bar, of dilettantes and scholars, of professors and students."

=== Jurisprudence ===
As expected, Reyes penned many leading decisions in civil law that remain widely studied today, including Tenchavez v. Escaño, 122 Phil. 765 (1966), on the recognition of foreign divorces in the Philippines; Republic v. Luzon Stevedoring, 128 Phil. 313 (1967), which defined force majeure; and Medina v. Makabali, 137 Phil. 329 (1969), affirming the best interest of the child as the paramount rule in custody cases. His dissenting opinion in Exconde v. Capuno, 101 Phil. 843 (1957), on the tort liability of schools for damages caused by their students, was eventually adopted by the Court in Amadora v. Court of Appeals, 160 SCRA 315 (1988).

Reyes weaved his strong nationalist views to an interpretation of the 1935 Constitution that emphasized its nationalistic thrust. He notably dissented in Moy Ya Lim Yao v. Commissioner of Immigration, 41 SCRA 292 (1971), where the Court had relaxed the requisites for a foreigner to acquire Filipino citizenship through marriage. Reyes opined that unlike perhaps in the United States, the Philippine constitution disfavored the absorption of immigrants and thus the citizenship laws should be interpreted with that view in mind. In similar fashion was Reyes's most famous opinion, among his last, in Republic v. Quasha, 46 SCRA 160 (1972).

The Court, through Reyes, insisted on a restrictive interpretation of the expiring Parity Amendments occasioned by the Bell Trade Act, towards the end of prohibiting the ownership by foreigners of residential lands. At the end of his opinion, he criticized the earlier enactment of the Parity Amendments to the Constitution, saying:

That Filipinos should be placed under the so-called Parity in a more disadvantageous position than United States citizens in the disposition, exploitation, development and utilization of the public lands, forests, mines, oils and other natural resources of their own country is certainly rank injustice and inequity that warrants a most strict interpretation of the "Parity Amendment", in order that the dishonorable inferiority in which Filipinos find themselves at present in the land of their ancestors should not be prolonged more than is absolutely necessary.

== IBP presidency and later activism ==
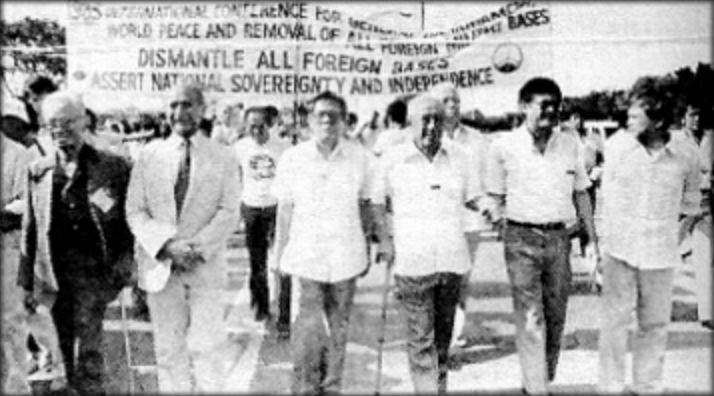
Anti-Bases Coalition Rally with José W. Diokno, Lorenzo Tañada Sr., Wigberto Tañada and Joker P. Arroyo

Shortly after his retirement from the Court, Reyes was elected as the first president of the Integrated Bar of the Philippines. During his years on the Court, he had been one of the most active proponents of bar integration in the Philippines. He served as IBP president until 1975, and was president emeritus from then on until his death.

Unburdened by his judicial role, Reyes became an active member in the political opposition against the martial law rule of Ferdinand Marcos. Together with the two main co-chairs Lorenzo M. Tañada and José W. Diokno, Reyes helped organize the Free Legal Assistance Group in October 1974 as a national officer, and later the Anti-Bases Coalition in 1983, which sought the removal of the American military bases in Clark and U.S. Naval Base Subic Bay. He also joined the Regional Council on Human Rights in Asia, which framed the very first Asian human rights declaration. He was the lead petitioner in the landmark Supreme Court case of Reyes v. Bagatsing, 125 SCRA 553 (1983), where he successfully sought injunctive relief against the mayor of Manila, who had wanted to prohibit demonstrations in front of the United States embassy.

After the ouster of Marcos following the 1986 EDSA Revolution, Reyes once more joined his friend and was named by President Cory Aquino as vice-chair under the newly created Commission on Human Rights. However, he resigned after serving as acting chair after Diokno resigned earlier in 1987 because of the murder of several unarmed farmers by policemen at Mendiola Street. Reyes then retired to private life and died aged 92 in 1994. He is buried at Loyola Memorial Cemetery in Marikina.

== Personal life and legacy ==
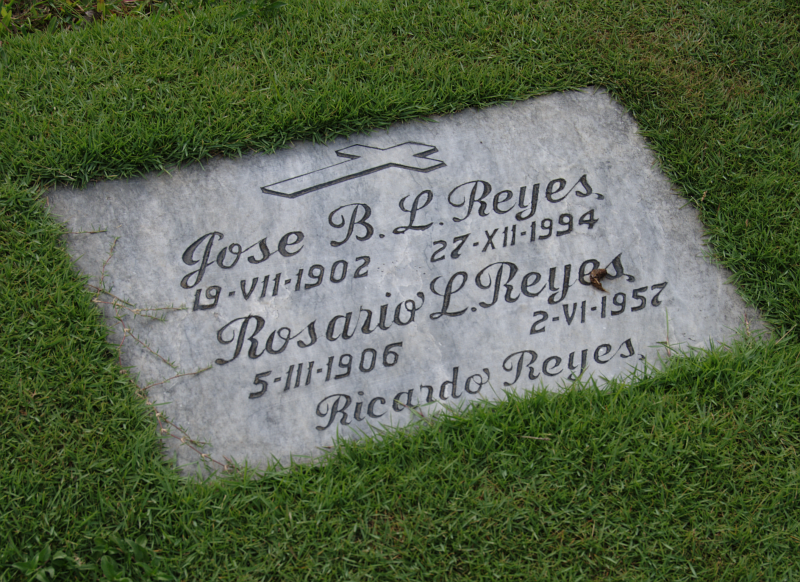
Grave of J.B.L. Reyes and his wife, Rosario

Reyes was married to Rosario L. Reyes, a distant relative who predeceased him by nearly forty years. They had three children.

Reyes had many protégés in the Philippine legal academe, especially in the field of civil law. The most prominent of them was Philippine Supreme Court Associate Justice Jose Vitug (who clerked for Reyes in the Court).

Following his retirement from the Court, Reyes was named as the head of the Civil Code Revision Committee of the UP Law Center. This committee was instrumental in the drafting of the Family Code that took effect in 1987. In this capacity, Reyes advocated the equal treatment of wives and husbands under family law, and many substantial changes to the Civil Code were enacted to that effect. While Reyes himself was in favor of allowing divorce, this was not adopted by the Family Code.

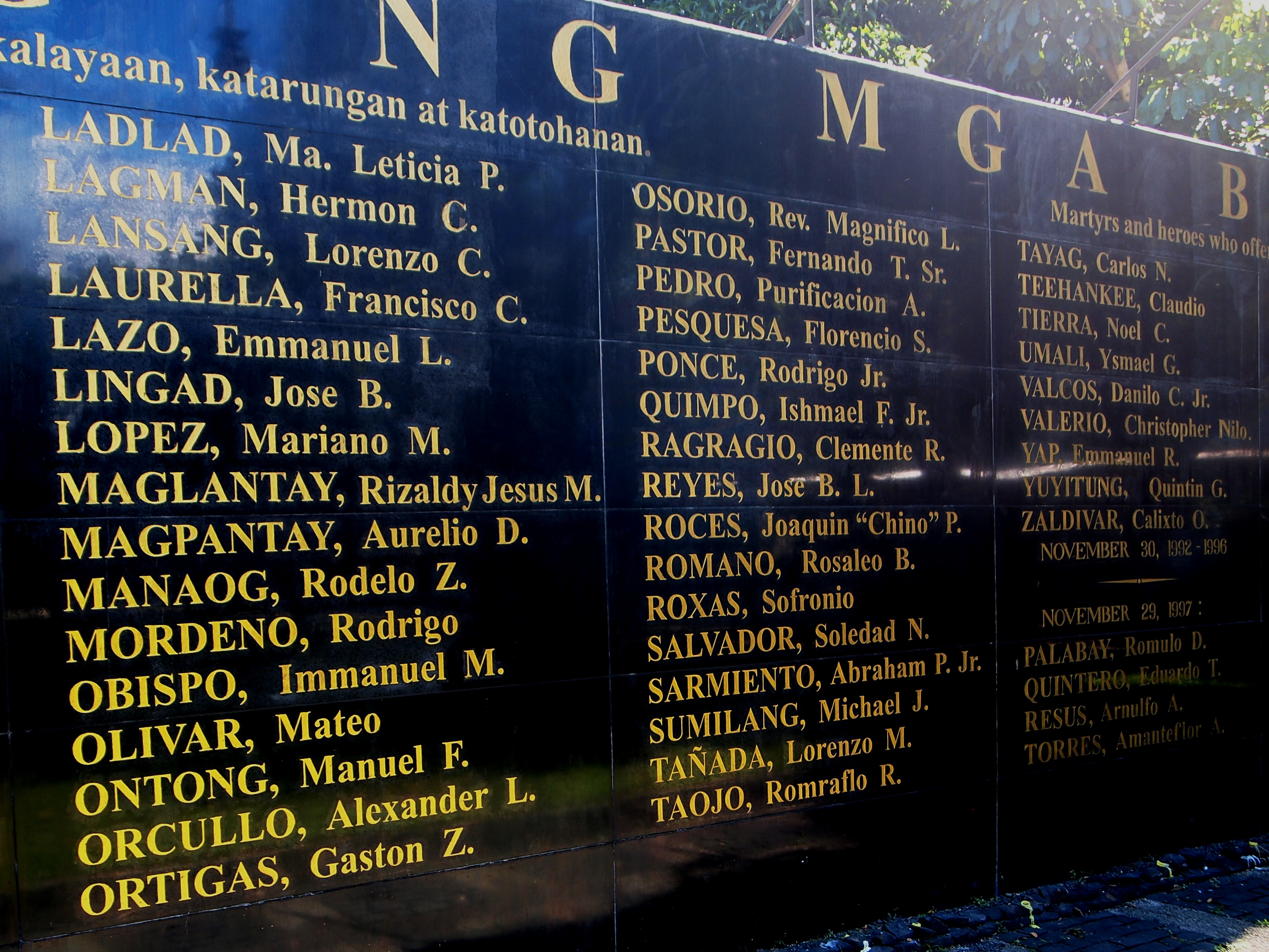
Detail of the Wall of Remembrance at the Bantayog ng mga Bayani in Quezon City, showing names from the first batch of Bantayog Honorees, including that of J.B.L. Reyes.

A more contentious component of Reyes's legacy was his role in the increased difficulty of the bar examinations. Since the end of World War II, the passing rate of the bar examinations had ranged from 56 to 72% percent. However, when Reyes chaired the Bar Examinations Committee in 1955, the passing rate dropped dramatically to 26.8%, with a mortality rate of 73.2%. That ratio has been invariably maintained in the 50+ years since.

Reyes was an enthusiastic amateur photographer and painter. He was also among the first prominent Filipino practitioners of yoga.

In 2006, the Integrated Bar of the Philippines dedicated the multipurpose hall in its main offices as the "Jose B.L. Reyes Hall".

Reyes's name is on the Bantayog ng mga Bayani Wall of Remembrance, which recognizes heroes who fought against martial law in the Philippines under Ferdinand E. Marcos.

== Some notable opinions ==
- Exconde v. Capuno (1957), dissenting
- Tenchavez v. Escaño (1965)
- Republic v. Luzon Stevedoring (1967)
- Medina v. Makabali (1969)
- Moy Ya Lim Yao v. Commissioner of Immigration (1971), dissenting
- Republic v. Quasha (1972)

== Bibliography ==
=== Selected books ===
- An Outline of Philippines Civil Law (with Ricardo C. Puno, 1964)
- The Making of a Subversive: a Memoir (1984)

=== Selected articles ===
- Observations on the New Civil Code on Points Not Covered By Amendments Already Proposed, series of articles published in the Lawyer's Journal, Vols. XV-XVI (1950–1951)

== Notes ==
Legal offices
Preceded by Ramon Diokno	Associate Justice of the Supreme Court of the Philippines; 1954–1972	Succeeded by Estanislao Fernandez
