= To Russia with Love (2022 film) =

2022 Philippine film

- Directed by: Veronica Velasco
- Screenplay by: Biboy Calleja
- Starring: Gerald Anderson; Elena Kozlova; Scott Alexander Young
- Production company: Mavx Production
- Distributed by: Netflix
- Release date: November 1, 2022
- Running time: 115 minutes
- Country: Philippines
- Language: English

To Russia with Love is a 2022 Philippine romantic comedy film directed by Veronica Velasco and starring Gerald Anderson, Elena Kozlova and Scott Alexander Young. The film revolves around a Filipino entrepreneur from Dipolog, who wins the affections of a Russian free-spirited traveler Oksana and must now also win over her stern and disapproving father Fyodor.

== Cast ==
- Gerald Anderson as Dennis, son of a farm owner and restaurateur based in Dipolog
- Elena Kozlova as Oksana, a Russian tourist who visited Dipolog
- Scott Alexander Young as Fyodor, Oksana's father
- Kakai Bautista as Gorgeous
- Simon Szabo as Maximoff
- Isay Alvarez as Thelma, Dennis's mother
- Malou Crisologo as Yaya Blessie
- Ivan Carapiet
- Jef Gaitan
- Karl Gabriel
- Veronica Reyes

== Production ==
In 2021, Russian ambassador to the Philippines Marat Pavlov revealed that a romance film titled To Russia with Love will be shot by "a Filipino and Russian film company" in Russia which will be about a "Filipino man falling in love with a Russian girl". To Russia with Love was produced as a straight-to-video due to the prevailing COVID-19 pandemic at the time.

However the film was later revealed to be a sole production of Philippine studio Mavx Productions under director Veronica Velasco and writer Biboy Calleja and was produced under . Filming for To Russia With Love took place in Moscow, Russia with some scenes taken in Dipolog, Zamboanga del Norte in the Philippines. The film is Kozlova's screen debut. The film was described as "celebrating Moscow-Manila ties."

== Release ==
To Russia with Love was first released on Netflix on November 1, 2022.

== Reception ==
A review in the Daily Tribune described the movie as formulaic, with poor acting from Anderson, and says that the only good scene was one in which Anderson's character wrestles a bear. Common Sense Media called it a "dull, confusing romcom". Fred Hawson whose review was published by ABS-CBN calls the film "predictable" and described the Russian characters as stereotypical. Hawson also noted the bear wrestling scene as the only part of the film with "realistic danger".

The film was among the most streamed on Netflix in the Philippines in November 2022.
