= Spring in Prague (film) =

- Directed by: Lester Dimaranan
- Written by: Eric Ramos
- Produced by: Ferdinand Topacio
- Starring: Paolo Gumabao; Sara Sandeva
- Production company: Borracho Film Production
- Release date: February 4, 2026
- Country: Philippines
- Languages: English; Czech; Filipino

Spring in Prague (Czech: Jaro v Praze) is a 2026 Philippine romantic comedy film directed by Lester Dimaranan and co-directed by Paolo Emmanuel Magsino. The film stars Paolo Gumabao and Czech actress Sara Sandeva in the lead roles. It is produced by Ferdinand Topacio under Borracho Film Production in collaboration with Czech partners.

The film explores a cross-cultural romance between a Filipino man and a Czech woman and was produced in connection with the 50th anniversary of diplomatic relations between the Philippines and the Czech Republic.

== Plot ==
The film follows Alfonso "Alfie" Mucho, a Filipino resort owner who meets Maruška Růžička, a Czech tourist visiting the Philippines. After developing a brief romantic relationship, Maruška returns to Prague, prompting Alfie to travel to the Czech Republic in hopes of rekindling their connection. As Alfie navigates an unfamiliar culture and environment, the film explores themes of love, cultural identity, and personal growth.

== Cast ==
- Paolo Gumabao as Alfonso "Alfie" Mucho
- Sara Sandeva as Maruška "Marie" Růžička
- Marco Gomez
- Elena Kozlova as Estrella
- Ynah Zimmerman
- Keahnna Reyes
- Tori Topacio
- Esel Ponce
- John Rey Malto as himself (talent manager)

== Production ==
Spring in Prague was directed by Lester Dimaranan and produced under Philippine-based Borracho Film Production of Ferdinand Topacio. Eric Ramos is the writer. According to Topacio, who served as producer for the film, the idea for the film came up in 2023 during a visit to Prague where he learned about stories from embassy officials of Czech women forming relationships with Filipino men.

While Spring in Prague deals with the romance between the Filipino and Czech lead, the film also draws inspiration from the Prague Spring in 1968 and was made to give subtext between democracy and communism.

Principal photography took place in both the Philippines and the Czech Republic, with filming locations including Puerto Galera and Tagaytay in the Philippines, as well as Prague. Members of the cast and crew cited winter conditions in Prague as a challenge during production.

== Release ==
Spring in Prague held a special premiere screening on January 19, 2026, at Gateway Cinema 12 in Quezon City. The film is to be theatrically released in the Philippines on February 4, 2026.

== See also ==
- Cinema of the Philippines
- Czech cinema
