= Elena Kozlova =

Filipino actress

- Елена Козлова
- Born: January 5, 1994 (age 32); Kazakhstan
- Occupations: Actress; Model
- Years active: c. 2004/05–present
- Known for: To Russia With Love
- Modeling information
- Hair color: Brown
- Eye color: Brown

Elena Kozlova (born January 5, 1994) is a Russian actress that first gained prominence in 2022 as the lead of To Russia With Love opposite Gerald Anderson. She has been residing and working in the Philippines as a model since 2018. Kozlova has recently started in another Philippine film named Spring in Prague released in 2026.

== Early life and education ==
Elena Kozlova was born on January 5, 1994 in Kazakhstan. She and her family moved to Barnaul, Altai Krai in Russia when she was five years old. Kozlova grew up aspiring to be a fashion designer for models. She attended two universities; Altai State University and Altai State Technology University obtaining bachelors degrees in international relations and finance respectively. She also did an internship for the Russian Ministry of Foreign Affairs.

== Career ==
=== Modeling ===
Kozlova was already scouted to be a model at age 11 by Russian modeling agents, doing work for teenage clothing brands. She later signed with international agencies appearing in television commercials and ad campaigns in the Middle East and the rest of Asia. Elena signed a contract with Philippines-based modeling agency Ideal People in 2018. This led to works promoting BLK Cosmetics, Avon, Francis Libiran, and the Philippine Department of Tourism.

=== Acting ===
Kozlova successfully auditioned for the lead role of Oksana for the 2022 film To Russia With Love of Mavx Productions. In the 2026 film Spring in Prague, Kozlova played the role of the best friend of the protagonist.

== Personal life ==
Kozlova is of Russian, Ukrainian and Tatar descent in terms of ethnicity although she has described herself as "Filipino by heart". She has also been learning to speak the Filipino language because of her involvement in the Philippine film industry.

Kozlova married Raymond Yap, a Filipino businessman at the Manila Cathedral on September 16, 2023. She originally intended to stay in the Philippines for only three months of her modeling contract but decided to settle after she met her eventual husband.

== Filmography ==
=== Film ===
| Year | Title | Role | Production |
|---|---|---|---|
| 2016 | King Liar | Beauty pageant contestant | SAK |
| 2021 | Risen | Russian translator | Aryavision Pictures,Vertical Entertainment |
| 2022 | To Russia With Love | Oksana | MAVX Production, Netflix |
| 2026 | Spring in Prague | Estrella | Borracho Film Production |

=== Television / digital series ===
| Year | Title | Role |
|---|---|---|
| 2023 | Almost Paradise | Pam |
| 2024 | Walang Matigas na Pulis sa Matinik na Misis | Fashion show model |
