= PLM Graduate School of Law =

Graduate law school

Pamantasan ng Lungsod ng Maynila Graduate School of Law
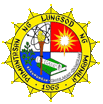
- Type: Public
- Established: 2004
- Dean: Justice Angelina Sandoval-Gutierrez (Ret.)
- Location: Intramuros, Manila, Philippines
- Website: http://www.plm.edu.ph/

The Graduate School of Law of the Pamantasan ng Lungsod ng Maynila is one of the eight graduate schools of the university. It was launched on July 7, 2004, at the Manila Hotel, with former Undersecretary of the Department of Justice, Atty. Ernesto L. Pineda, as its first dean. Currently, former Supreme Court's Second Division Chairman Justice Angelina G. Sandoval-Gutierrez sits as the dean of the Graduate School of Law.
