= Far Eastern University Institute of Law =

Law school in the Philippines

Institute of Law
- Established: 1934
- Affiliations: Philippine Association of Law Schools
- Dean: Juan Arturo Iluminado De Castro, J.S.D.
- Location: Sen. Gil Puyat Ave cor. Zuellig Loop, Makati, Metro Manila, Philippines
- Campus: Far Eastern University - Makati
- Colors: Purple
- Website: www.feu.edu.ph/index.php/institutes/institute-of-law/

The Far Eastern University – Institute of Law, also known as FEU Law or IL, is the Legal Education Board-accredited law school of the Far Eastern University. It is one of the four earliest institutes that comprised the university in 1934.

FEU Law currently offers a Juris Doctor degree.

== Brief history ==
The Institute of Law (IL) was formally established by Nicanor Reyes Sr. in 1934, the same year that the Far Eastern University was founded, making it one of the older law schools in the country.

In 1970, six out of the top ten placers in the Bar Exams were graduates of IL; no other school did better until 1984.

In 2003, the Institute teamed up with the De La Salle Graduate School of Business to offer the JD-MBA program, the first graduate dual program in law and business administration in the country. The dual degree program is designed to provide students with the knowledge and skills necessary to excel in two interrelated disciplines and to understand the interrelationships between them. However, in 2014, this partnership was abolished.

In 2011, based on the Bar Examinations passing rate from 2001 to 2010, the Legal Education Board recognized the Far Eastern University Institute of Law as the Ninth Most Outstanding Law School in the country.

Alumni include a Chief Justice and an Associate Justice of the Supreme Court, several Associate Justices of the Court of Appeals and the Sandiganbayan, a Secretary of Justice, and numerous trial court judges and government prosecutors.

== Academic programs ==
The Institute of Law offers a degree program of Juris Doctor since 2013, shifting from its Bachelor of Laws program.

== Facilities ==
The institute is housed in the Makati campus of the university; wherein classes are being held at the fourth and sixth floors and a Law library on the 5th floor.

It has bar review rooms and a moot court apart from classrooms.

== Deans ==
- Juan Arturo Iluminado C. De Castro (2026 - Present)
- Jose Marlon L. Pabiton (2023 - 2026).
- Melencio "Mel" Sta. Maria (2014 - 2023) Some textbooks written by him have been cited as authorities by the Philippine Supreme Court, and he acts as an expert witness in the field of Philippine Contract Law in international arbitration cases.
- Andres Bautista was Sta. Maria's predecessor.
- Antonio H. Abad Jr., a former dean, became Dean of the Adamson University.
- Neptali Álvaro Gonzales (1976 - 1986)
- Jovito "Jovy" Reyes Salonga (1956)

== Student organizations ==
- Far Eastern University Institute of Law Student Council is the official student government of the Institute of Law.
- The Far Eastern Law Review is the official student-run law journal of the Institute of Law. Established in 1972, the Law Review contains scholarly articles written by law students, alumni, and esteemed faculty members and cover a vast array of laws and jurisprudence. Former Chief Justice Artemio Panganiban is one of the publication's notable alumni.
- Far Eastern University Institute of Law Centralized Bar Operations is the student arm that helps graduates of the Institute of Law when they take the annual Bar Examinations. Its activities include providing study materials, organizing hotel accommodations, and other support activities exclusively for the institute's bar examinees.
- Far Eastern University Institute of Law Moot Court Council is the student debating society. It provides training, in-house practice drills and other inter-university competitions. They are one of the best Moot Court in the Philippines, they have competed internationally to be the flag bearer of the country.
- The Far Eastern University Legal Aid Bureau (formerly Legal Rights Center) was created by virtue of Supreme Court Bar Matter No. 651 issued in 1993. Its primary aims are to provide clinical legal education to law students, legal internship for graduating law students, and free legal assistance to indigents. The Legal Aid Bureau also conducts community paralegal training, seminars and conferences on socio-legal issues and outreach activities. Internal activities include team building and leadership training and academic discussions. It raises funds which the Bureau can utilize in handling free cases for indigent litigants.
- ACLAS (Alliance of Concerned Law Students)
- Tau Kappa Phi Exclusive FEU Fraternity conducts BAR Operations for its barrister brothers, review clinics for law students, and other philanthropic efforts.

== Students' complaint ==
In 2000, ten law students of the Institute of Law lodged a complaint against Dean Andres Bautista, Associate Dean Teresita Cruz and two professors before the Commission on Higher Education (CHED) for alleged irregularity. The complainants, headed by Artemio Urriza Jr., alleged that they were supposed to graduate in 1999 year but were unjustifiably given failing grades in two to three subjects taught by professors Atty. Ed Vincent Albano and Atty. Japar Dimaampao.

Their letter of complaint said they unduly received failing grades in Civil Law Review 2, Commercial Law Review and Remedial Law subjects.

"We firmly believe that we all passed our subjects and are very qualified to graduate but because of the whimsical and deliberate intentions of a 'triumvirate conspiracy' headed by our dean, Andres Bautista, together with our two professors, we became victims of injustices," they said. But Bautista denied the complainants' allegations as he maintained that the ten deserved to flunk in these subjects.

"We held a faculty deliberation on the second week of March. Professors then expressed reservations among some students, including them (complainants). It was decided that they need to take up these subjects again," he added. Bautista said that faculty deliberation is conducted to enable professors to collectively discuss the status of students.

== Notable alumni ==
- Artemio Panganiban - former Chief Justice of the Philippine Supreme Court; 6th placer, 1960 Bar Examinations, 1960 FEU Law cum laude and Most Outstanding Student
- Corazon Aquino - the first woman president in Asia and the Philippines
- Jose Nolledo - Member, Philippine Constitutional Commission of 1986; Delegate, Philippine Constitutional Convention of 1971; 3rd placer, 1958 Bar Examinations
