= Continuing legal education in the Philippines =

See also, Continuing legal education

Continuing legal education is required of members of the Integrated Bar of the Philippines (IBP) to ensure that throughout their career, they keep abreast with law and jurisprudence, maintain the ethics of the profession and enhance the standards of the practice of law.

== History ==
The Rules on Mandatory Continuing Legal Education (MCLE) for members of the legal profession in the Philippines were recommended by the Integrated Bar of the Philippines (IBP), endorsed by the Philippine Judicial Academy, and reviewed and passed upon by the Supreme Court Committee on Legal Education in 2001. Under the said Rules, members of the IBP are required every three (3) years to complete at least thirty-six (36) hours of continuing legal education activities approved by an MCLE Committee constituted by the Supreme Court. (Rule 2, Bar Matter No. 850 – Supreme Court of the Philippines)

== Scope ==
Of the required 36 hours: (a) At least six (6) hours shall be devoted to legal ethics (b) At least four (4) hours shall be devoted to trial and pretrial skills (c) At least five (5) hours shall be devoted to alternative dispute resolution (d) At least nine (9) hours shall be devoted to updates on substantive and procedural laws and jurisprudence (e) At least four (4) hours shall be devoted to legal writing and oral advocacy (f) At least two (2) hours shall be devoted to international law and international conventions (g) The remaining six (6) hours shall be devoted to such subjects as may be prescribed by the MCLE Committee

== Compliance ==
(Quoted hereunder, for your information, is a resolution of the Supreme Court En Banc dated June 3, 2008:)

“Bar Matter No. 1922. - Re: Recommendation of the Mandatory Continuing Legal Education (MCLE) Board to Indicate in All Pleadings Filed with the Courts the Counsel’s MCLE Certificate of Compliance or Certificate of Exemption. - The Court Resolved to NOTE the Letter, dated May 2, 2008, of Associate Justice Antonio Eduardo B. Nachura, Chairperson, Committee on Legal Education and Bar Matters, informing the Court of the diminishing interest of the members of the Bar in the MCLE requirement program.

Court further Resolved, upon the recommendation of the Committee on Legal Education and Bar Matters, to REQUIRE practicing members of the bar to INDICATE in all pleadings filed before the courts or quasi-judicial bodies, the number and date of issue of their MCLE Certificate of Compliance or Certificate of Exemption, as may be applicable, for the immediately preceding compliance period. Failure to disclose the required information would cause the dismissal of the case and the expunction of the pleadings from the records.

The New Rule shall take effect sixty (60) days after its publication in a newspaper of general circulation.”

(Note: Published on 26 June 2008, Manila Bulletin.)

(Rule 2, Bar Matter No. 850 – Supreme Court of the Philippines)

Credit units maybe earned through either participatory or non-participatory activities. For instance, participatory credit units may be claimed for: (a) attending approved education activities like seminars, conferences, conventions, symposia, in-house education programs, workshops, dialogues or round table discussion; (b) speaking or lecturing, or acting as assigned panelist, reactor, commentator, resource speaker, moderator, coordinator or facilitator in approved education activities; (c) teaching in a law school or lecturing in a bar review class. On the other hand, non-participatory credit units may be earned for: (a) preparing, as an author or co-author, written materials published or accepted for publication, e.g., in the form of an article, chapter, book, or book review which contribute to the legal education of the author member, which were not prepared in the ordinary course of the member's practice or employment; or (b) editing a law book, law journal or legal newsletter.

== Exemption ==
The following members of the Bar are exempt from the MCLE requirement:

(a) The President and the Vice President of the Philippines, and the Secretaries and Undersecretaries of Executive Departments;
(b) Senators and Members of the House of Representatives;
(c) The Chief Justice and Associate Justices of the Supreme Court, incumbent and retired members of the judiciary, incumbent members of the Judicial and Bar Council and incumbent court lawyers covered by the Philippine Judicial Academy program of continuing judicial education;
(d) The Chief State Counsel, Chief State Prosecutor and Assistant Secretaries of the Department of Justice
(e) The Solicitor General and the Assistant Solicitors General
(f) The Government Corporate Counsel, Deputy and Assistant Government Corporate Counsel;
(g) The Chairmen and Members of the Constitutional Commissions;
(h) The Ombudsman, the Overall Deputy Ombudsman, the Deputy Ombudsman and the Special Prosecutor of the Office of the Ombudsman;
(i) Heads of government agencies exercising quasi-judicial functions;
(j) Incumbent deans, bar reviewers and professors of law who have teaching experience for at least ten (10) years in accredited law schools
(k) The Chancellor, Vice-Chancellor and members of the Corps of Professors and Professorial Lecturers of the Philippine Judicial Academy;
(l) Governors and Mayors
