= Philippine Bar Examinations =

Bar examination in the Philippines

- Type: Bar examination
- Administrator: Supreme Court Bar Examination Committee
- Skills tested: Understanding of the basic principles of law and of relevant jurisprudence
- Purpose: Admission to practice law
- Year started: 1901
- Offered: Three separate days held within eight days every September (since 2023); Four separate days held for two weeks in September (2022); Two days held within three days in February (2021); Four Sundays of November of every year (2011 to 2019); Four Sundays of September (1901 to 2010)
- Restrictions on attempts: 75% passing average
- Regions: Philippines
- Annual number of test takers: ▲10,490 (in 2024)
- Prerequisites: see Admission requirements
- Qualification rate: 30–40% average passing rate
- Website: Supreme Court Bar Matters

The Philippine Bar Examinations is the professional licensure examination for lawyers in the Philippines. The exam is exclusively administered by the Supreme Court of the Philippines through the Supreme Court Bar Examination Committee.

== History ==
The first Philippine Bar Exams were conducted in 1901 with only 13 examinees. The third Philippine Bar Exam took place in 1903 but the results were released in 1905. José L. Quintos of Escuela de Derecho de Manila (now Manila Law College) obtained the highest rating of 96.33%, future President Sergio Osmeña was second with 95.66%, future CFI Judge Fernando Salas was third with 94.5% and future President Manuel L. Quezon fourth with 87.83%. The bar exam in 1903 had only 13 examinees. The first Roll of Attorneys were listed in 1945 after the 1944 bar exam. After the 1903 exam, rankings were again avoided until the 1913 exam, with its first English exam and first top-ten list of topnotchers led by future president Manuel Roxas from UP Manila with 92%. This meant that every other year from the inaugural 1901 examination to 1912, and the 2020-21 examination, there were no scores given other than pass or fail. The 2016 bar exam had the highest number of successful candidates since 1954 with 3,747 out of 6,344 (59.06 percent) examinees, but that ratio was later topped in 2020-21 (72.28 percent, the third highest at that point). Past Bar examinations were conducted every September at De La Salle University until 2010 when they moved the date to November and changed the venue to University of Santo Tomas in 2011. By February 2022, the Bar examinations had been regionalized and different schools were chosen as venues for the examination, switching to three or four day schedules in one week. The examination was also converted from the traditional pen and booklet to an online method.

Meanwhile, the lowest year was the 1999 bar examinations which recorded the lowest passing rate of 16.59% or with a total number of 660 successful examinees. Also, the 2003 bar exam was marred by controversy when the Court ordered a retake of the Mercantile law exams due to questionnaire leakage. However, five months after the September 21 Mercantile law examination, the Supreme Court of the Philippines decided to cancel the retaking of the examinations, with the reason being to save the trouble for the examinees. It instead assigned different percentages per subject of the examinations.

In 2005, the Supreme Court implemented the "five-strike" rule, which disqualifies five-time flunkers from taking future bar exams. The five-strike rule imposes conditions on the third and fourth failed exams. After failing three times, certain conditions will have to be complied with before an examinee can take the examinations for the fourth time. Failing four times will also result in the same outcome — one will have to comply with certain conditions once more in order to be able to take the bar exam for the fifth time. Beyond that, flunkers are no longer allowed to take the bar exam. Eight years after the rule was imposed, however, in 2013, The Supreme Court lifted the five-strike rule in taking the bar examinations. Court spokesman Theodore Te said the rule was lifted after the SC en banc adopted a recommendation by a study group to lift the five-strike policy starting on the bar exams in 2014. The lifting, however, could not be applied to the 2013 examination as the list of probable bar candidates had already been published by that point.

In 2024, the Supreme Court ruled that individuals' scores were sensitive personal information under the Data Privacy Act and cannot be disclosed without prior consent of the examinees. However, it allowed law schools to requests for individual scores in such a manner that does not identify any single examinee.

In 2025, the Supreme Court adopted the rule that bar examinations shall be administered by electronic means and shall take place annually in local testing centers across the Philippines in the venue to be designated by the Supreme Court

== Admission requirements ==
A bar candidate must meet the following academic qualifications

- Holder of a Law degree from a recognized law school in the Philippines and satisfactorily completed the courses on the bar subjects and the mandatory Clinical Legal Education Program (CLEP)
- Holder of a bachelor's degree with academic credits in certain required subjects from a recognized college or university in the Philippines or abroad.

Candidates should also meet certain non-academic requisites:

- A Filipino citizen.
- At least twenty-one years of age.
- A resident of the Philippines.
- Satisfactory evidence of good moral character (usually a certificate from the dean of law school or an immediate superior at work).
- No charges involving moral turpitude have been filed against the candidate or are pending in any court in the Philippines.

In March 2010 the Philippine Supreme Court Issued Bar Matter 1153, amending provisions in Sections 5 and 6 of Rule 138 of the Rules of Court, now allowing Filipino foreign law school graduates to take the Bar Exam provided that they comply with the following:

1. Completion of all courses leading to a degree of Bachelor of laws or its equivalent;
2. Recognition or accreditation of the law school by proper authority;
3. Completion of all fourth year subjects in a program of a law school duly accredited by the Philippine Government; and
4. Proof of completing a separate bachelor's degree.

== Committee of Bar Examiners ==
The Supreme Court appoints memberships in the Committee of Bar Examiners, the official task force for formulating bar exam questions, instituting policy directives, executing procedures, grading bar examination papers, and releasing the results of the annual bar examination.

The committee is chaired by an incumbent Justice of the Supreme Court, who is designated by the Supreme Court to serve for a term of one year. The members of the committee includes eight members of the Integrated Bar of the Philippines, who also hold office for a term of one year. While the Justice who shall act as chairman is immediately known, committee members must exert every effort to conceal their identities until the oath-taking of the successful bar examinees, approximately six months after the bar exam.

Year	Bar Exam Chairperson
2001	Associate Justice Sabino De Leon Jr.
2002	Associate Justice Vicente Mendoza
2003	Associate Justice Jose Vitug
2004	Associate Justice Leonardo Quisumbing
2005	Associate Justice Romeo Callejo Sr.
2006	Associate Justice Angelina Sandoval-Gutierrez
2007	Associate Justice Adolfo Azcuna
2008	Associate Justice Dante Tiñga
2009	Associate Justice Antonio Eduardo Nachura
2010	Associate Justice Conchita Carpio-Morales
2011	Associate Justice Roberto A. Abad
2012	Associate Justice Martin Villarama
2013	Associate Justice Arturo Brion
2014	Associate Justice Diosdado Peralta
2015	Associate Justice Teresita de Castro
2016	Associate Justice Presbitero Velasco Jr.
2017	Associate Justice Lucas Bersamin
2018	Associate Justice Mariano del Castillo
2019	Associate Justice Estela Perlas-Bernabe
2020	Postponed due to the COVID-19 pandemic
2021	Associate Justice Marvic Leonen
2022	Associate Justice Alfredo Benjamin Caguioa
2023	Associate Justice Ramon Paul Hernando
2024	Associate Justice Mario V. Lopez
2025	Associate Justice Amy Lazaro-Javier
2026	Associate Justice Samuel Gaerlan
2027	Associate Justice Ricardo Rosario

== Bar review programs ==
Candidates who meet all the admission requirements usually enroll in special review classes after graduating from law school. These programs are held from April to September in law schools, colleges, universities, and review centers.

Program schedule, content, and delivery differs from one review program to another. Lecturers in these programs are called bar reviewers. They are usually full-time professors and part-time professorial lecturers in law schools and universities. Most review programs invite incumbent and retired justices and high ranking public officials both as a marketing tool and as a program innovation.

== Coverage ==
Previously, the bar examinations was conducted in all four Sundays of the month of November. Two bar subjects were taken every week, one is scheduled in the morning while another is in the afternoon. However, beginning in the 2023 Bar Examinations, the examinations were now conducted in three separate days in the month of September, and reduced the bar subjects from eight to six:

First Day

- Political and Public International Law

- Constitutional Law
- Administrative Law
- Law on Public Officers
- Election Law
- Local Government Code
- Public International Law

- Commercial and Taxation Laws

- Corporation Law
- Partnership
- Insurance Law
- Transportation Law
- Banking Laws
- Intellectual Property Law
- Securities Regulation Code
- Data Privacy Act
- Electronic Commerce Act
- Access Devices Registration Act
- Philippine Competition Act
- Public Services Act
- Taxation Law

Second Day

- Civil Law

- Effect and Application of Laws
- Human Relations
- Persons and Family Relations
- Property and Ownership
- Different Modes of Acquiring Ownership
- Land Title and Deeds
- Wills and Succession
- Obligations and Contracts
- Sales
- Lease
- Agency
- Credit Transactions
- Compromise Agreement
- Quasi-Contracts
- Torts and Damages

- Labor Law and Social Legislation

- Fundamental Principles and Concepts
- Recruitment and Placement of Workers
- Employer-Employee Relationship
- Labor Standards
- Social Welfare Benefits
- Management Prerogative
- Post-Employment
- Labor Relations
- Jurisdiction and Remedies

Third Day

- Criminal Law

- Fundamental Concepts
- Revised Penal Code
- Special Penal Laws
- Practical Exercises

- Remedial Law, and Legal and Juridical Ethics, with Practical Exercises

- General Principles
- Jurisdiction
- Rules on Civil Procedure
- Rules on Special Civil Actions
- Rules on Special Proceedings and Special Writs
- Rules on Criminal Procedure
- Rules on Evidence
- Legal and Juridical Ethics with Practical Exercises

=== Grading system ===
The six bar subjects are separately graded. Each subject contributes to the general average in the following proportion:

Subject	Weight
Political and Public International Law	15%
Commercial and Taxation Laws	20%
Civil Law	20%
Labor Law and Social Legislation	10%
Criminal Law	10%
Remedial Law, Legal and Judicial Ethics with Practical Exercises	25%

The passing average fixed by law is 75%, with no grade falling below 50% in any bar subject.

=== Passing average vs. Passing rate ===
The passing average is the minimum grade in the exam required to be admitted to the practice of law. The passing rate is the proportion of total number of bar passers in relation to the total number of bar examinees. It is usually computed on two levels—the national level (national bar passing rate), and the law school level (law school passing rate).

In the past, passing averages were considerably lower to admit more new lawyers (i.e. 69% in 1947, 69.45% in 1946, 70% in 1948). Since 1982, the passing average has been fixed at 75%. This has led to a dramatic decrease in the national passing rate of bar examinees, from an all-time high of 75.17% in 1954 to an all-time low of 16.59% in 1999 (all-time low should have been the single digit 5% national passing rate for the 2007 bar examination if the Supreme Court did not lower the passing average to 70% and lowered the disqualification rate in 3 subjects). In recent years, the annual national bar passing rate ranges from 20% to 30%.

=== Law school passing rates ===
The following schools are the top performing law schools in the Philippines, based on a Legal Education Board study of the cumulative results of the bar examinations from 2018 to 2024.

1. Ateneo de Manila University (93.60%)
2. Ateneo de Davao University (92.79%)
3. University of the Philippines (91.52%)
4. San Beda University (89.66%)
5. University of San Carlos (86.54%)
6. University of Santo Tomas (83.48%)
7. Polytechnic University of the Philippines (82.38%)
8. St. Louis University (81.21%)
9. Angeles University Foundation (80.13%)
10. Xavier University - Ateneo de Cagayan (78.65%)

The ranking does not account for the number of candidates from each law school except to determine which schools were ranked. This differs from annual Supreme Court data, which brackets law schools based on the number of candidates that participate. For the 2024 bar examination results, the Supreme Court categorized law schools as those sending over 100 candidates, 51-100 candidates, 11-50 candidates, and 10 or fewer candidates, with the following results:For schools with more than 100 test-takers, the complete rankings are:

1. Ateneo de Manila University (96.02%, 169/176)
2. University of the Philippines (90.51%, 229/253)
3. San Beda University (89.73%, 131/146)
4. University of Santo Tomas - Manila (80.35%, 139/173)
5. University of San Carlos (79.05%, 117/148)

For schools with 51-100 examinees:

1. Ateneo de Davao University (94.55%, 52/55)
2. Pamantasan ng Lungsod ng Maynila (83.58%, 56/67)
3. Polytechnic University of the Philippines (75.95%, 60/79)
4. Saint Louis University (74.60%, 47/63)
5. University of Cebu (74.32%, 55/74)

For schools with 11-50 examinees:

1. West Visayas State University (92.31%, 12/13)
2. University of Makati (90.91%, 20/22)
3. University of Asia and the Pacific (87.50%, 21/24)
4. Angeles University Foundation School of Law (84.38%, 27/32)
5. Notre Dame of Marbel University (78.57%, 11/14)

For schools with 1-10 examinees:

1. North Eastern Mindanao State University (100%, 4/4), Saint Columban College (100%, 5/5) and Our Lady of Mercy College (100%, 1/1)
2. Mariano Marcos State University (90%, 9/10)
3. Batangas State University (71.43%, 5/7)
4. Manila Adventist College (44.44%, 4/9)
5. Tomas Claudio College (40%, 4/10) and St. Mary's College of Tagum, Inc. (40%, 2/5)

Out of 142 law schools that participated in the 2024 Bar Examinations, 130 produced successful examinees.

=== Role of the Supreme Court, Criticisms ===
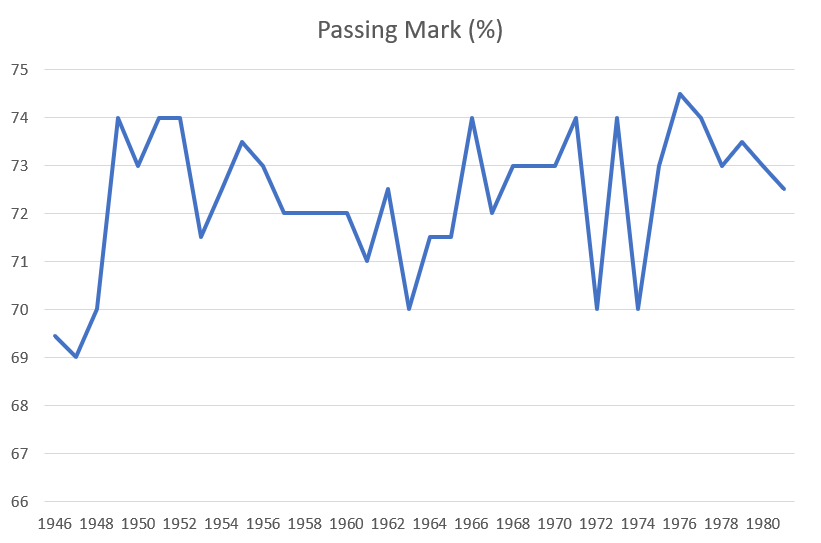

In 2007, only 5% (of the 5,626 who took the 2007 tests, or less than 300) got the passing grade of 75%. Thus, the Supreme Court adjusted the standard to 70% and the disqualification rate in 3 subjects (civil, labor and criminal law) from 50 to 45%. Accordingly, 1,289 or 22.91%, "passed." This passing grade reduction is highly unusual, since it last happened in the 1981 exam when the passing grade was lowered to 72.5%. Prior to 1982, the passing mark jumped unpredictably from year to year:

Passing Grade fluctuations between 1946 and 1981 (56)
Year	Passing Mark (%)	Year	Passing Mark (%)
1946	69.45	1964	71.5
1947	69	1965	71.5
1948	70	1966	74
1949	74	1967	72
1950	73	1968	73
1951	74	1969	73
1952	74	1970	73
1953	71.5	1971	74
1954	72.5	1972	70
1955	73.5	1973	74
1956	73	1974	70
1957	72	1975	73
1958	72	1976	74.5
1959	72	1977	74
1960	72	1978	73
1961	71	1979	73.5
1962	72.5	1980	73
1963	70	1981	72.5

In 1954, the Court lowered the passing grade to 72.5%, even if the passing percentage was already at its highest at 75.17%. In 1999, moves to lower the passing grade to 74% failed, after Justice Fidel Purisima, bar committee chairman failed to disclose that his nephew took the examination. He was censured and his honoraria was reduced to half.

== Increasing difficulty ==
The difficulty of the recent bar examinations, compared to exams of the past, can be attributed to the following factors:

- The growing volume of Philippine case and statutory laws is unprecedented. Laws, jurisprudence, and legal doctrines of the past constitute only a small fraction of contemporary Philippine legal materials, which are increasing on a daily basis.
- The 75% passing average with no grade lower than 50% in any subject is already fixed by law. Actual candidates who scored 74.99% in the general average were not admitted to the practice of law, unless they retake the bar exams.
- The Three-Failure Rule is now in place. Candidates who have failed the bar exams for three times are not permitted to take another bar exam until they re-enroll and pass regular fourth-year review classes and attend a pre-bar review course in an approved law school.
- The Five-Strike Rule was implemented from 2005 and ended in 2014. The rule limits to five the number of times a candidate may take the Bar exams. The rule disqualifies a candidate after failing in three examinations. However, he is permitted to take fourth and fifth examinations if he successfully completes a one-year refresher course for each examination. On September 3, 2013, the Supreme Court, issued a resolution, lifting the five-strike rule on bar repeaters.
- The four-year bachelor's degree is required before admission to law school. Hence, every bar examinee has to hold at least two degrees—one in law and one in another field. In the past, law schools readily admit high school graduates and two-year Associate in Arts degree holders.

After the end of the Second World War, the passing rate in the succeeding years was remarkably high, ranging from 56 to 72% percent. However, after Associate Justice J.B.L. Reyes, a noted scholar, was appointed Chairman of the 1955 Bar Examinations, the passing rate for that year dropped dramatically to 26.8%, with a failure rate of 73.2%. That ratio has been invariably maintained in the 50+ years since.

== Waiting period ==
Previously, largely essay-written-type exams are manually checked by members of the Committee of Bar Examiners. Candidates have to wait from the last Sunday of the bar exams in September up to the date of the release of results, which traditionally happens before or during the Holy Week (the last week of March or the first week of April) of the following year. During this period, candidates (who already hold law and bachelor's degrees) may opt to work in law firms and courts as legal researchers, teach in liberal arts and business colleges, function in companies and organizations using their pre-law degrees (i.e. Communication Arts, Accounting, Economics, Journalism, etc.), or even their law degrees for that matter, help run the family business, or take a long vacation. However, the recent shift to digitalization of the exams had reduced the waiting period to more than two months only, e.g., the 2023 Bar Examinations was held in September of the same year with the results released on 5 December 2023.

== Admission of successful bar examinees ==
The Office of the Bar Confidant of the Philippine Supreme Court releases the Official List of Successful Bar Examinees, usually during the last week of March or the first week of April of every year. Candidates whose names appear in the list are required to take and subscribe before the Supreme Court the corresponding Oath of Office.

Candidates shall take an Oath of Office and sign their names in the Roll of Attorneys of the Supreme Court. The oath-taking is usually held in May at the Philippine International Convention Center (PICC) with a formal program where all Justices of the Supreme Court, sitting en banc, formally approve the applications of the successful bar candidates. The eight bar examiners are officially introduced to the public. A message to the newly inducted lawyers is delivered by one of the justices. Candidates who made the bar top ten list are also introduced and honored. The deans of all Philippine law schools are requested to attend the ceremony and grace the front seats of the plenary hall.

== Controversies ==
In the 1930s, a distant relative of Imelda Romualdez Marcos who was a Justice in the High Court resigned after a controversy involving the bar examinations. Justice Ramon Fernandez was forced to protect his name and honor when he resigned because of a bar examination scandal.

On May 7, 1982, 12 of the Supreme Court's 14 justices resigned amid revelations "that the court fixed the bar-examination score of a member's son so that he would pass." Justice Vicente Ericta was accused to have personally approached the bar chairman to inquire whether his son passed the bar. President Ferdinand Marcos accepted the resignations and appointed new justices. Chief Justice Enrique Fernando accepted responsibility for rechecking and changing the exam score of Gustavo Ericta, son of Justice Vicente Ericta.

On September 24, 2003, the Supreme Court, annulled the test results on mercantile law after "confirmation of what could be the most widespread case of cheating in the 104-year-old bar exams".

== Bar topnotchers ==
Bar topnotchers are bar examinees who garnered the highest bar exam grades in a particular year. Every year, the Supreme Court releases the bar top ten list. The list contains the names of bar examinees who obtained the ten highest grades. It is possible for more than ten examinees to place in the top ten because numerical ties in the computation of grades usually occur.

== See also ==
- 2010 Philippine Bar exam bombing
- Legal education in the Philippines
- Integrated Bar of the Philippines
