= Integrated Bar of the Philippines =

Organization of lawyers in the Philippines

- Pinagsamang mga Abogasya ng Pilipinas
- Integrated Bar of the Philippines logo
- Formation: 1973
- Type: Bar association
- Headquarters: Julia Vargas Avenue, Ortigas Center, Pasig, Metro Manila
- Members: 78,785
- Official language: English; Filipino
- National President: Allan G. Panolong
- Website: www.ibp.ph

The Integrated Bar of the Philippines (IBP; Filipino: Pinagsamang mga Abogasya ng Pilipinas) is the national organization of lawyers in the Philippines. It is the mandatory bar association for Filipino lawyers.

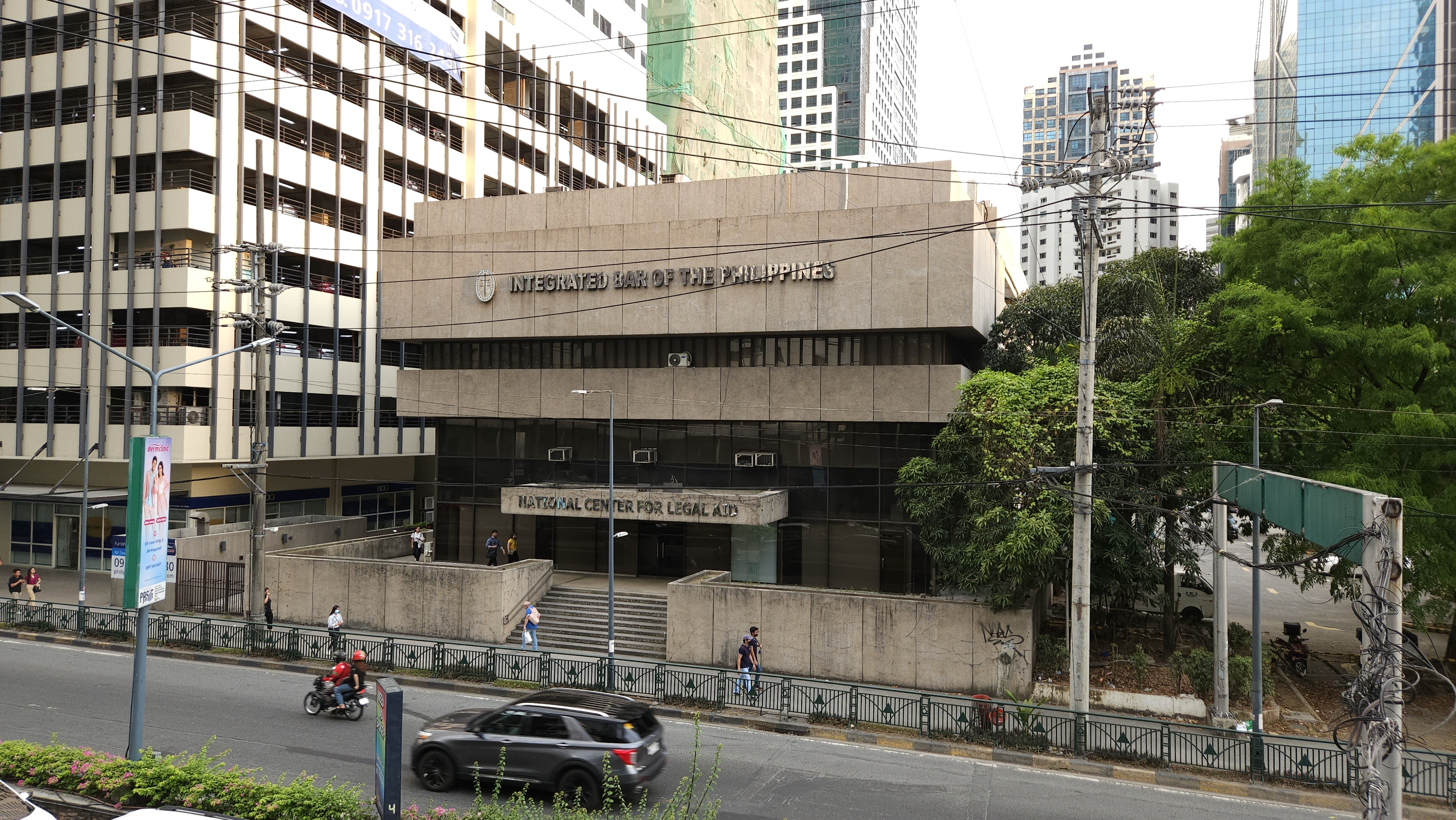
IBP Building in Ortigas Center, Pasig

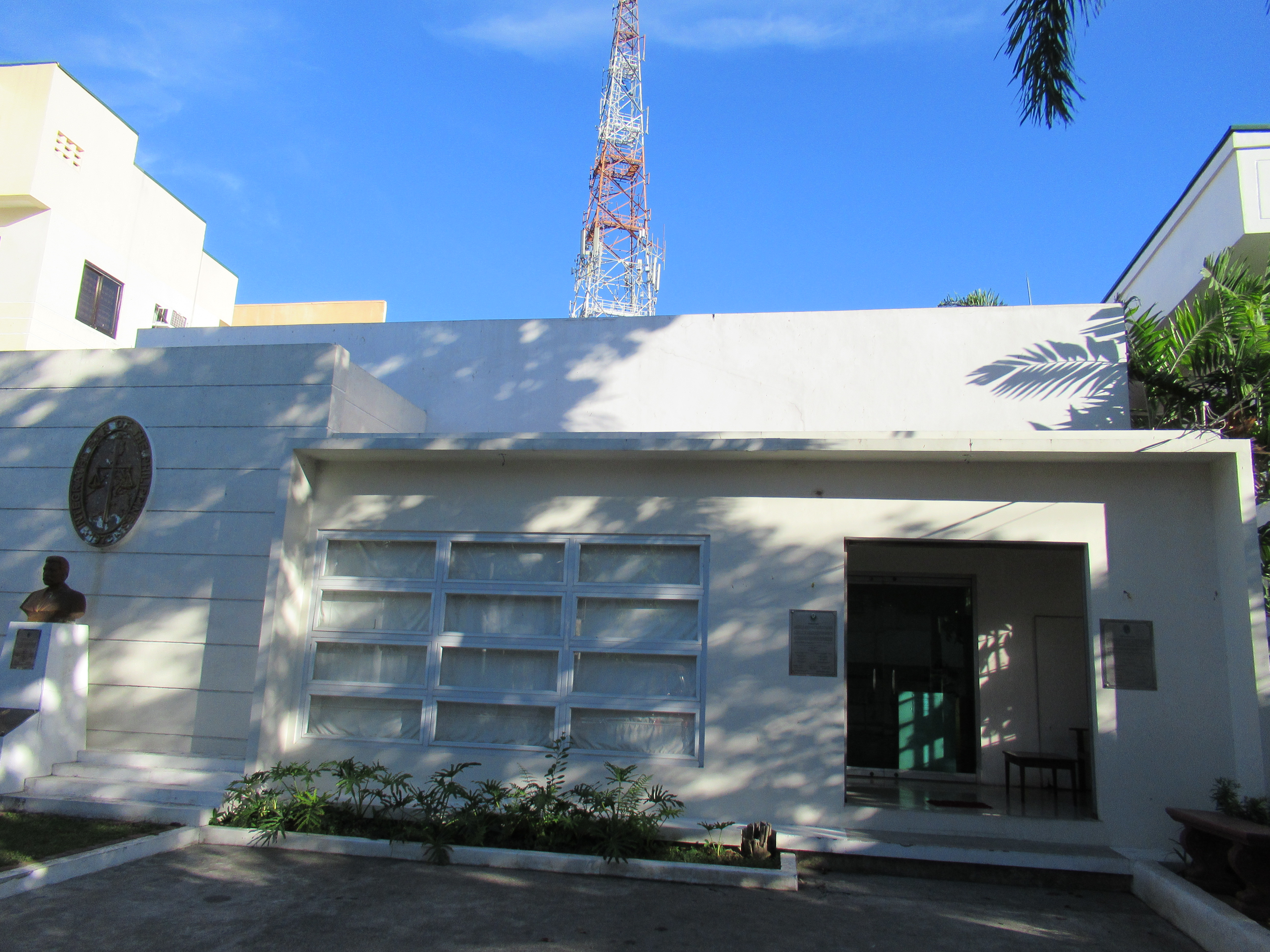
Bulacan Chapter

== History ==
The IBP was established as an official organization for the legal profession by Republic Act No. 6397. The law confirmed the constitutional power of the Philippine Supreme Court to adopt rules for the integration of the Philippine Bar. Consequently, Presidential Decree 189 constituted the IBP into a corporate body in 1973.

On January 9, 1973, the Supreme Court ordained the integration of the Philippine Bar. The IBP Constitution and By-Laws shortly followed.

Then recently retired Supreme Court associate justice J.B.L. Reyes was named as the first chairman of the IBP in 1973. He served in that capacity until 1975, and was the chairman emeritus for the remainder of his life. Reyes had been a longtime proponent of bar integration in the Philippines.

== Organizational structure ==
The IBP is administered by a Governing Board consisting of nine governors representing the nine regions of the IBP. The Governing Board elects the IBP national president and IBP executive vice president from among themselves or from outside the board.

The IBP House of Delegates decide on important matters. The chamber is composed of not more than one-hundred-twenty members apportioned among all IBP chapters in major cities throughout the country. Every two years, the IBP Governing Board makes a reappointment of delegates among all IBP chapters.

== Membership ==
The IBP Constitution and By-Laws considers the following, "automatically and without exception," as members of the IBP:

- All lawyers whose names were in the Roll of Attorneys of the Supreme Court on January 16, 1973.
- All lawyers whose names were included or are entered therein after the said date.

There are currently about forty-thousand (40,000) living attorneys who comprise the IBP.

These are the attorneys whose names appear in the Rolls of Attorneys of the Supreme Court. They have qualified for and have passed the Philippine Bar Examination conducted annually, and have taken the attorney's oath, unless otherwise disbarred.

Membership in the IBP is compulsory for all lawyers in the country. The Philippine Supreme Court has required all lawyers to indicate their Roll of Attorneys Number in all papers and pleadings filed in judicial and quasi-judicial bodies in addition to the previously required current Professional Tax Receipt (PTR) and IBP Official Receipt or Life Member Number.

== Notable projects ==
The IBP has been active in safeguarding the integrity of the bar exams; promoting ethical practices of lawyers, judges, lawyer-politicians, and lawyer-government officials; refraining from any partisan political activity especially during local and national elections; developing legal education and research in law schools and continuing legal education centers; and expanding legal aid offices throughout the country to provide free legal services to indigent Filipinos.

The IBP National Committee on Bar Discipline is the special group monitoring and upholding ethical practices in the profession.

The IBP National Committee on Legal Aid is the ad hoc committee for establishing and maintaining suitable legal aid offices in all IBP Chapters nationwide.

== Protests and marches against Gloria Macapagal Arroyo ==
On December 20, 2007, the Integrated Bar of the Philippines (through IBP president Feliciano Bautista and all the nine members of the IBP Board of Governors - IBP governors Abelardo Estrada, Ernesto Gonzales Jr, Marcial Magsino, Bonifacio Barandon Jr, Evergisto Escalon, Raymond Jorge Mercado, Ramon Edison Batacan and Carlos Valdez Jr.) affirmed their published statement that it "is prepared to stage street protests to express the "growing anger" of lawyers over controversies pestering the Gloria Macapagal Arroyo's administration; we are ready. If we have to go to the streets we'll do it. We can't remain silent and neutral."

Integrated Bar of the Philippines (48,000 members in 83 chapters nationwide) president Feliciano Bautista informed Newsbreak newspaper that the bribery expose of Governor Eddie Panlilio triggered hitting the "culture of corruption" in the Gloria Macapagal Arroyo administration. The statement of concern advertisement was published in the Philippine Daily Inquirer on December 17 and in Philippine Star on December 20. IBP called for three courses of action: a) "prosecution of cases against corrupt government officials, b) continued Senate investigation on alleged corruption in government contracts, and c) filing of an impeachment case against President Arroyo." IBP also held the government responsible for widespread smuggling activities, extrajudicial killings, forced disappearances, and ghost projects. It called on the House of Representatives to endorse the impeachment complaint against President Arroyo and admonished the Senate to continue probes on government anomalies. In March 2006, the IBP, for the first time, organized its lawyers in a street protest against President Arroyo's Proclamation 1017.

== See also ==
- Philippine Bar Examinations
- Legal education in the Philippines
- Supreme Court of the Philippines
- Judicial and Bar Council
- Professional Regulation Commission
