= University of Santo Tomas on stamps, banknote and coins =

The University of Santo Tomas has appeared on Philippine postage stamps, issued by the Philippine Postal Corporation (PHLPost), a banknote and commemorative coins and medals. The commemorative stamps often feature the founder of the University of Santo Tomas, Miguel de Benavides, the Arch of the Centuries and the UST Main Building. The anniversaries of some constituent colleges are also celebrated on postage stamps.

== Stamps ==
=== University and Dominican history ===
In 1956, the post office issued the first postage stamp to feature the university. Printed by a Swiss printing firm Courvoisier S.A., it was released on the 345th anniversary of UST. The 5-centavo and 60-centavo stamps feature the columns and the spandrel of the Arch of the Centuries and the UST Main Building.

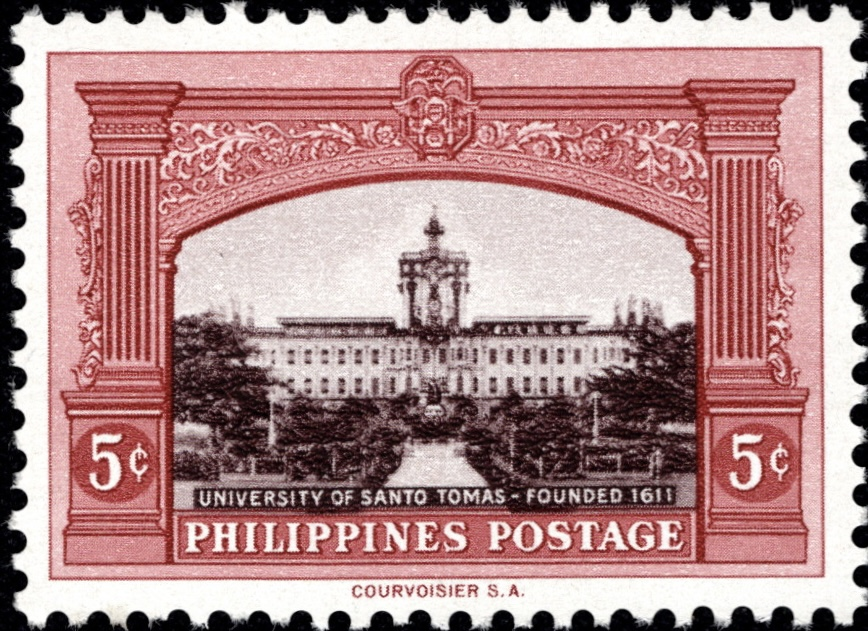
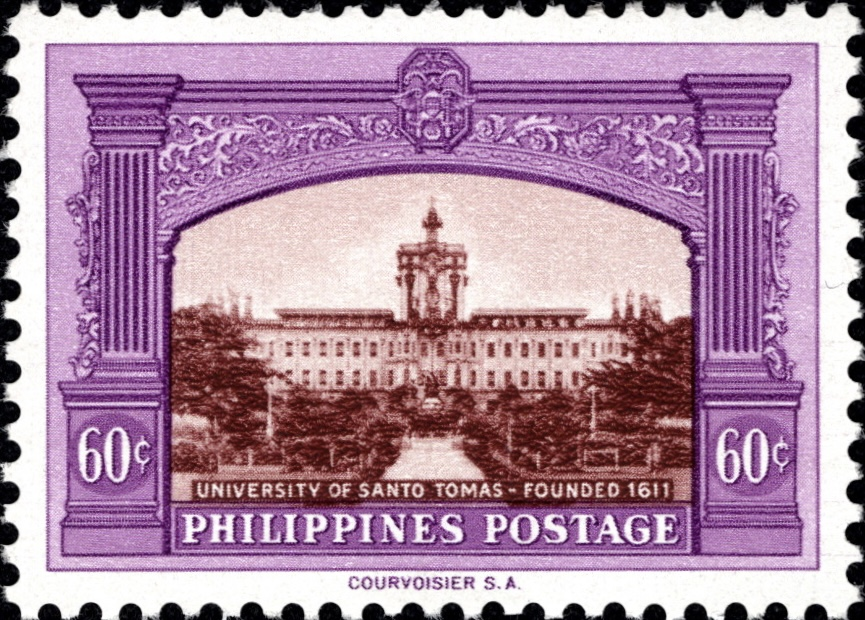
UST 1956 issue

In 1983, to commemorate the 390th anniversary of the first local printing press, a 40-centavo stamp was issued. It features the woodblock printing or xylographic press that is believed to be established by the Dominicans in 1593. A replica of the press machine was commissioned in 2009 for the Lumina Pandit exhibit and is currently displayed in the Miguel de Benavides Library. A second replica is displayed in the UST Museum of Arts and Sciences. Doctrina Christiana, the first book in the Philippines was printed using the xylographic method in 1593. The book was published in Spanish-Tagalog and Chinese versions.

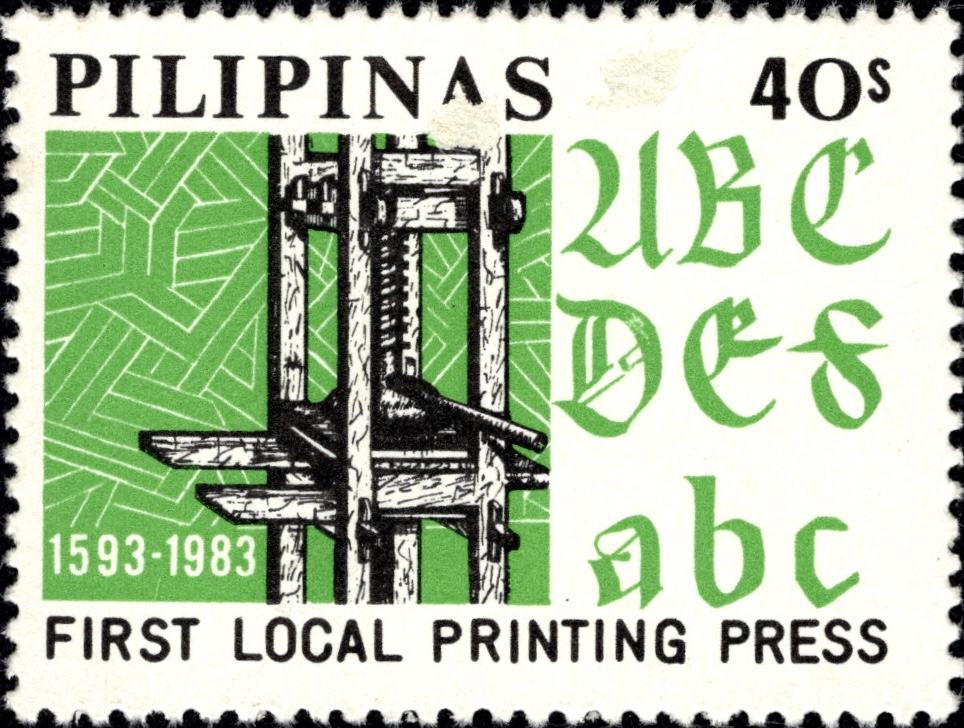
First local printing press 1983 issue

The Dominican Order was commemorated on its 400th anniversary in the Philippines with 3 stamps in 1987. The 5.50-peso UST stamp features the UST Main Building tower and the foundation of the university mural by Antonio Garcia Llamas (1952-1954) that is found in the lobby of the UST Main Building. The mural depicts Miguel de Benavides, with Bernardo de Santa Catalina and Baltasar Fort. The 4.75-peso Letran stamp feature the St. John the Baptist Building, Colegio de San Juan de Letran founders Don Juan Geromino Guerrero and fray Diego de Santa Maria, who are flanked by graduating students. The 1-peso stamp features the Santo Domingo Church in Quezon City and the image of Our Lady of La Naval de Manila.

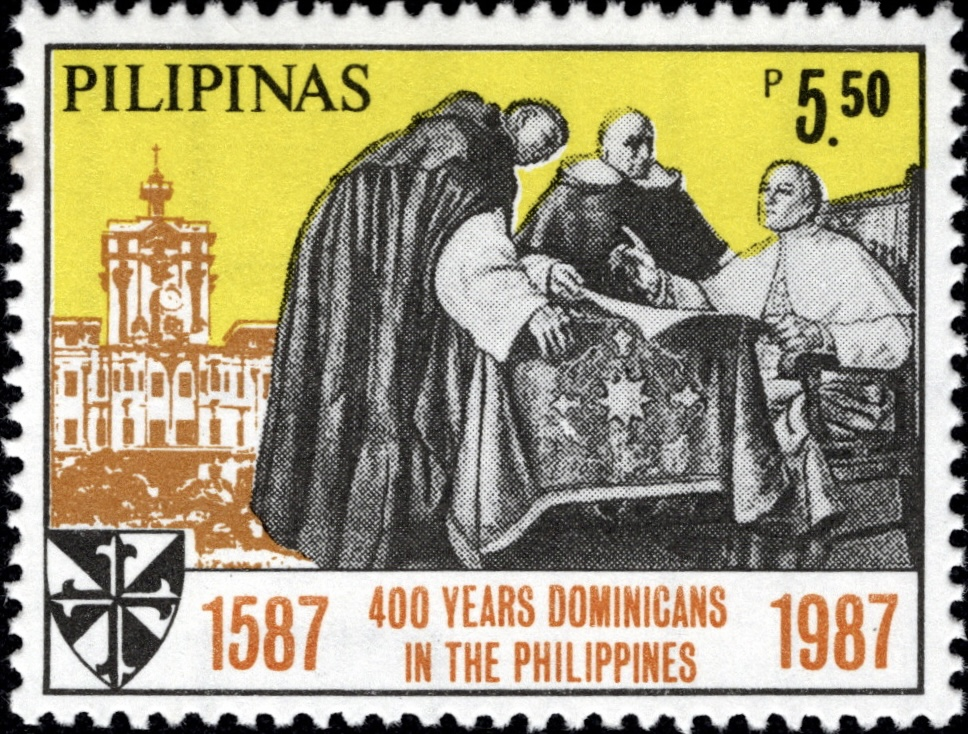
The Foundation of the University of Santo Tomas by Antonio Garcia Llamas (1952-1954)

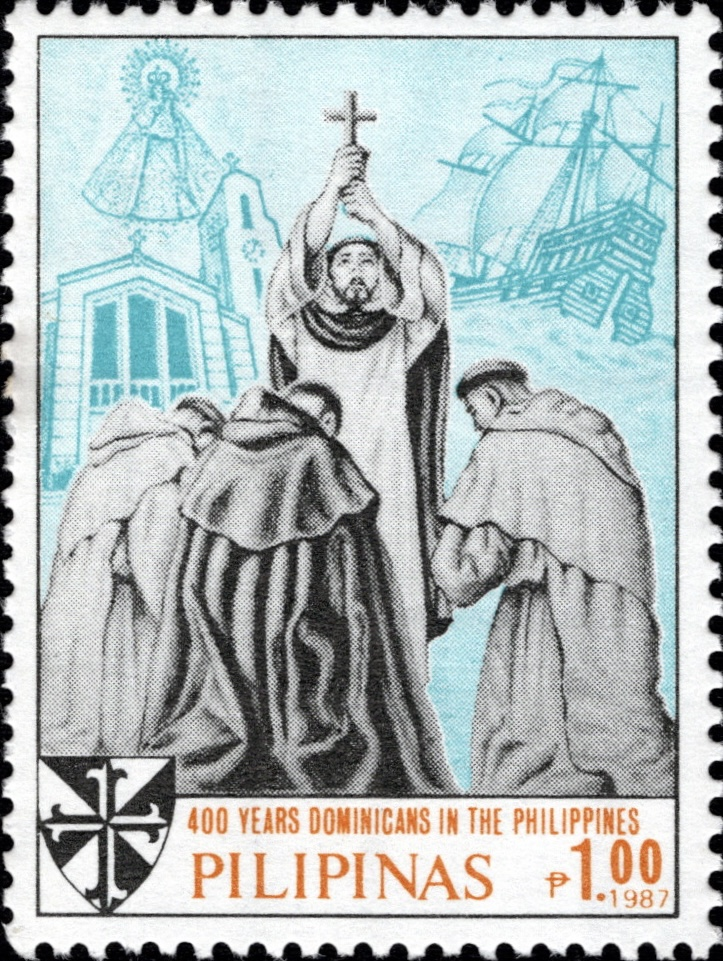
Dominicans and the Santo Domingo Church in Quezon City.

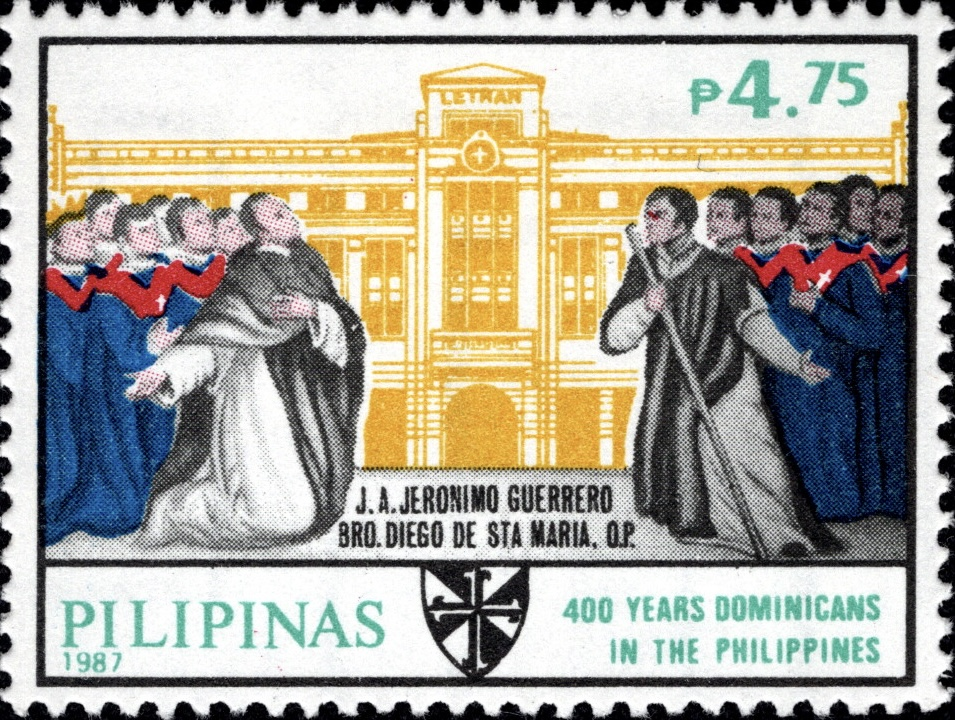
Dominicans and Letran

In 1995, the Philippine Post Office issued two sets of 18 and 12 stamp sheets to commemorate the 50th anniversary of the end of World War II. It features the various landings (arrivals) of American forces and liberation of Philippine cities in 1945. The Liberation of UST stamp is depicted by the Arch of the Centuries, the sillhouette of the UST Main Building tower, and the shoulder sleeve insignias of the United States' 37th Infantry Division and 1st Cavalry Division. The university campus served as an internment camp from 1942 to 1945.

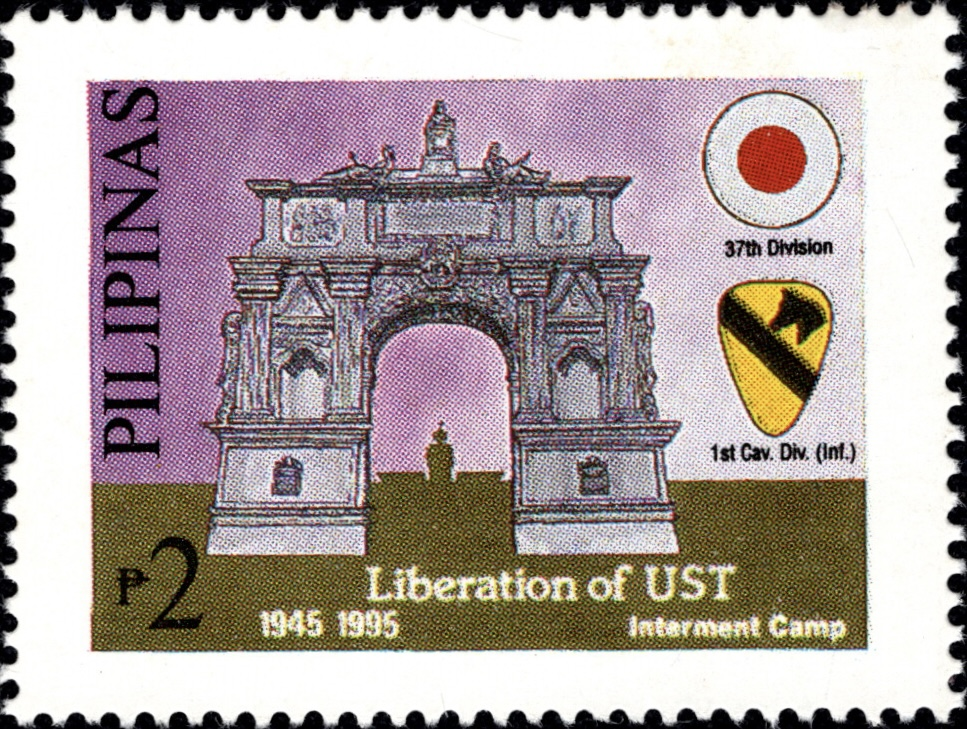
Liberation of UST 1995 issue

In 2000, in celebration of the new millennium, four series of stamps were issued to highlight the Philippines' culture and history. The Millennium Series I depicts the 1986 People Power Revolution. The Millennium Series II includes pre-colonial artifacts and the first millennium sunrise in Pusan Point. The third series features the earliest seacrafts. The Millennium Series IV shows the country's development in trade, education and communication. The 5-peso stamp that represents development in education feature the UST Main Building in España and the old campus in Intramuros. The replica of the first printing press is also showed in the development in communication stamp.

The University of Santo Tomas Hospital, Santo Tomas University Hospital as it was called then, celebrated its 50th anniversary in 1996. On March 5, 1996, the PHLpost commemorated the hospital with the issuance of a 2-peso stamp. It features the private division wing of the hospital, later renamed as the St. Vincent Ferrer building, and the old hospital logo.

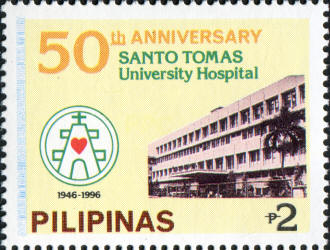
Santo Tomas University Hospital 1995 issue

In 2011, stamps were issued to commemorate the quadricentennial anniversary of the university. The first set features the Benavides Monument and the Quattromondial. The second set is composed of 4 stamps. The first stamp features the UST Main Building. The second stamp features the Central Seminary. The third stamp features the Arch of the Centuries. The fourth stamp features The Foundation of the University of Santo Tomas by Archbishop Benavides painting by Domingo A. Celis in 1911. It depicts Miguel de Benavides giving instructions for the foundation of an institution of higher learning.

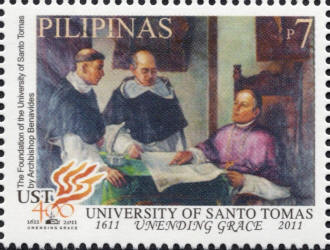

=== Constituent colleges ===
The 5-centavo and 2-peso Faculty of Medicine and Surgery and the Faculty of Pharmacy commemorative stamps were issued in 1971, on the centennial year of their foundation. The stamps feature the shield logos of the two faculties and the UST Main Building's tower.

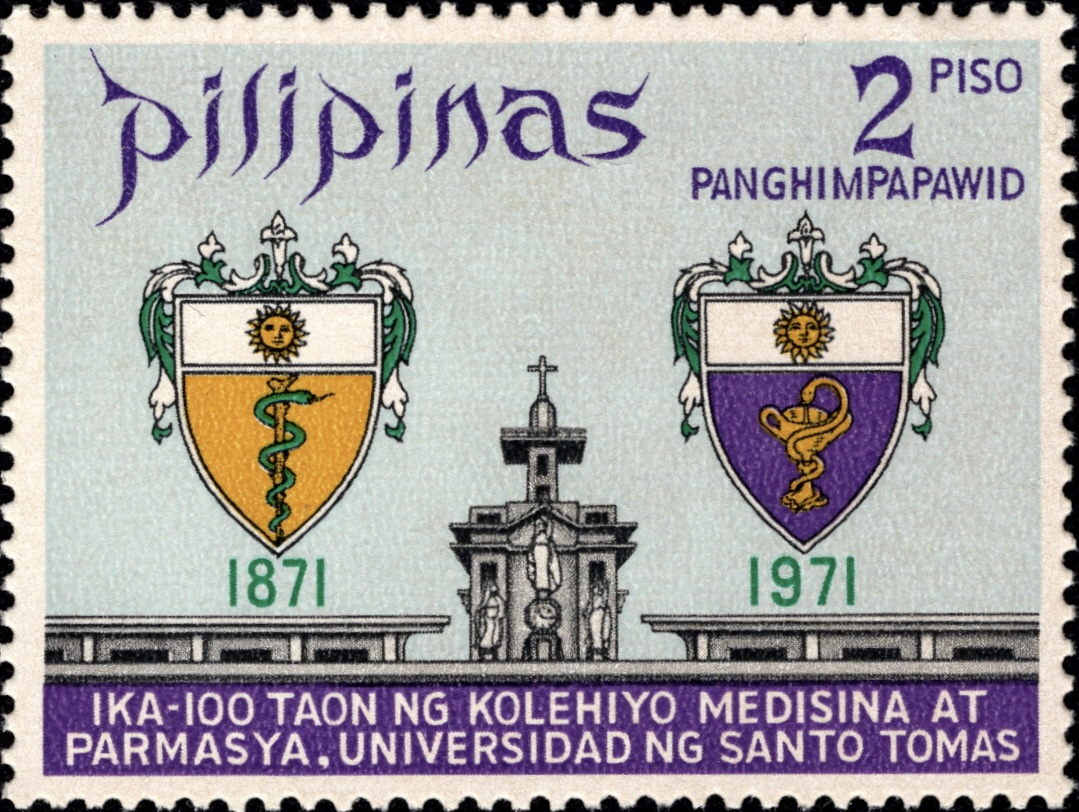
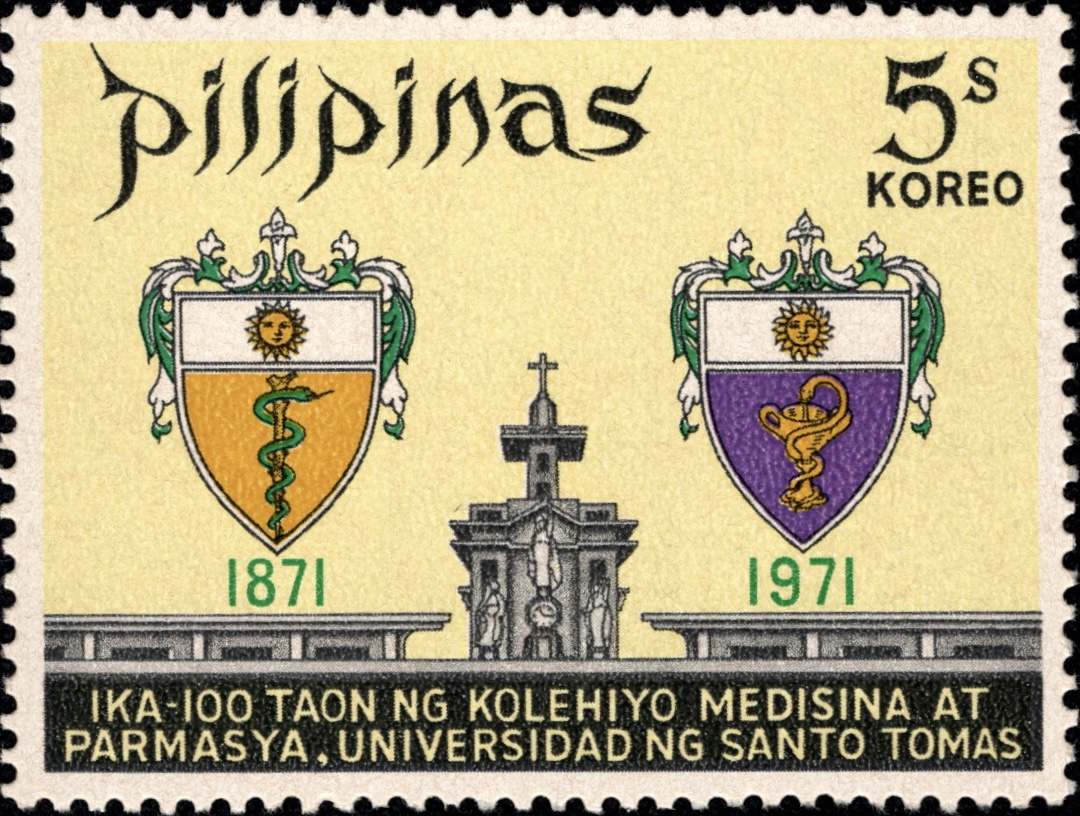
Faculty of Medicine and Surgery and Faculty of Pharmacy 100th anniversary
1971 issue

The College of Science and College of Education 50th anniversaries were celebrated with 15-centavo and 50-centavo stamps in 1976. Both stamps feature their college logos.

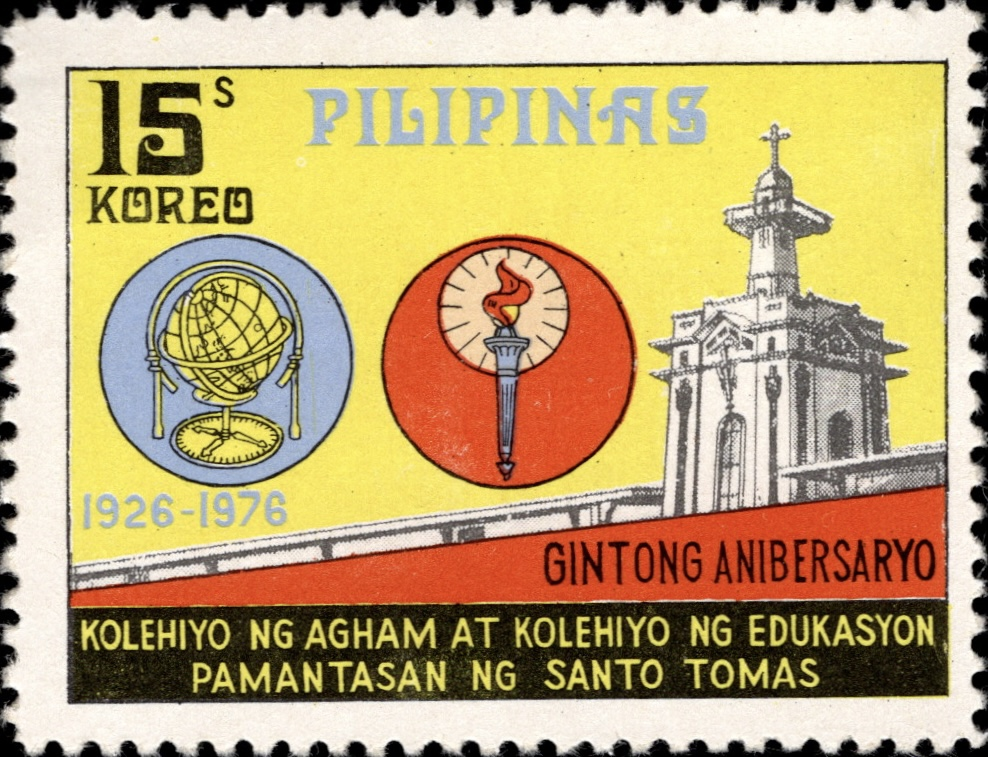
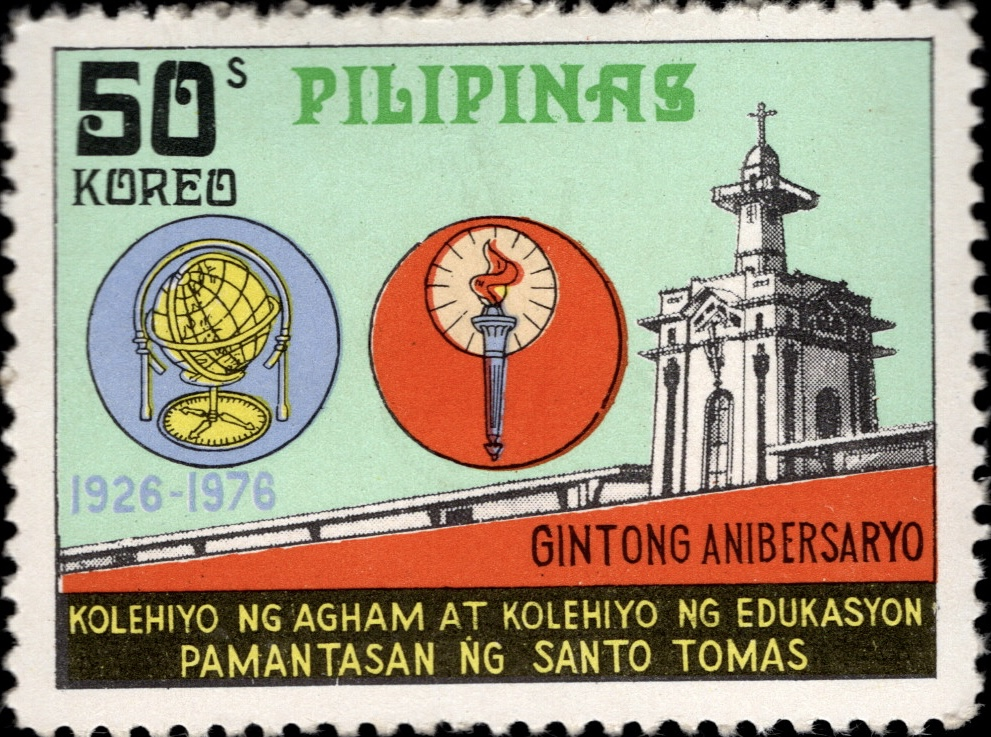
College of Science and College of Education 50th anniversary
1976 issue

UST Graduate School 50th Anniversary of 1988.

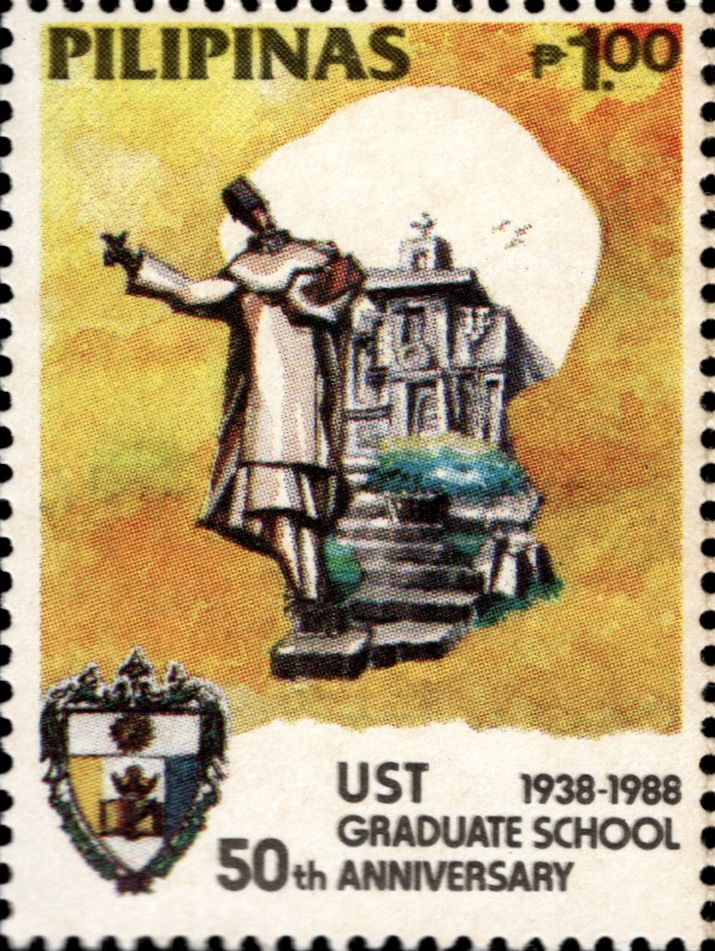

The stamps that were released in 2022 for the sesquicentennial anniversary of the UST Faculty of Medicine and Surgery feature the 1958 History of Medicine mural frescoes of Vicente Manansala found in the lobby of the San Martin de Porres building. The first set includes the murals: St. Cosmas and St. Damian, Jesus Christ forgives and cures the paralytic, and the Founding of the UST Faculty of Medicine & Surgery. The second set includes The first laparotomy in the Philippines and the Miraculous healings at Lourdes, France.

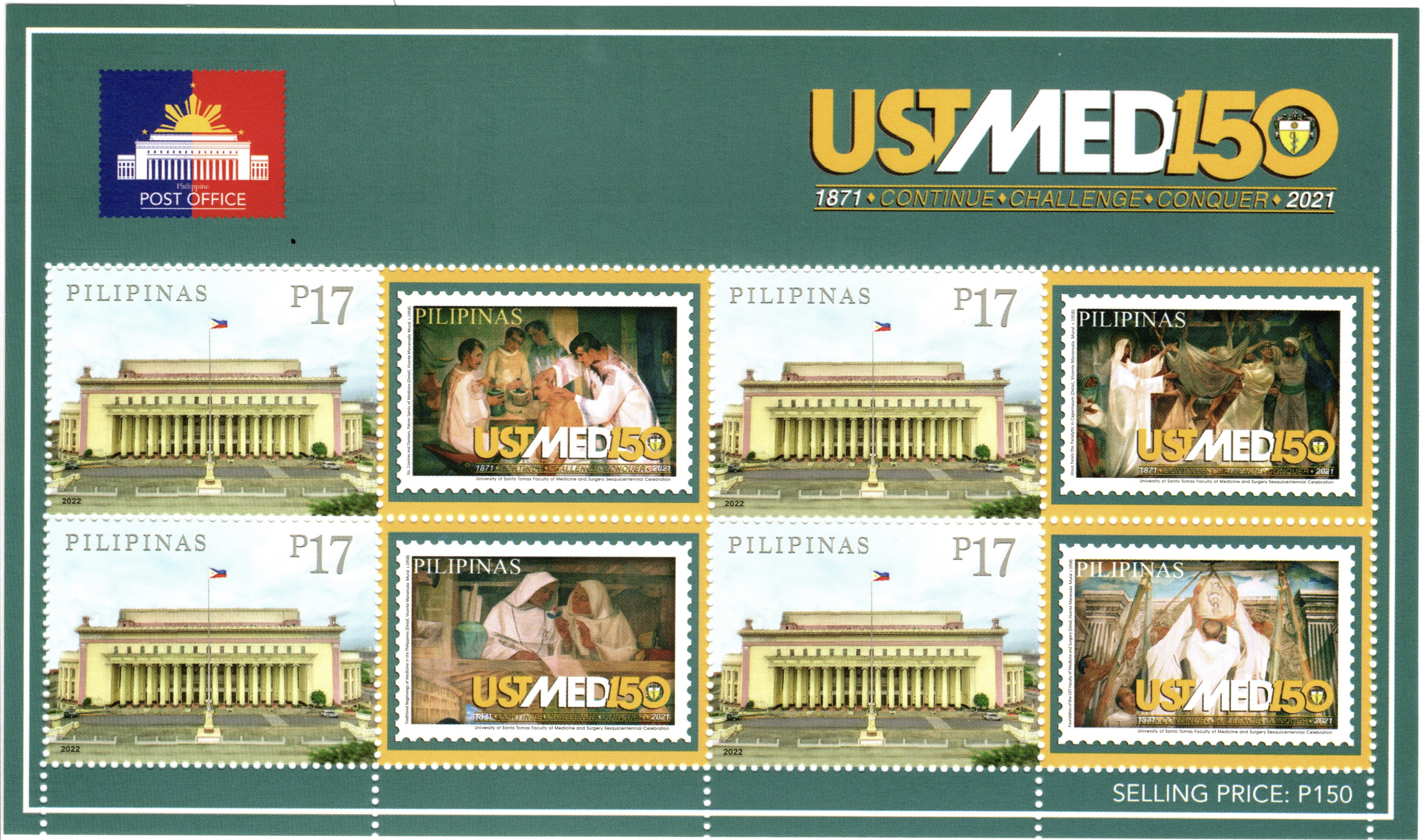

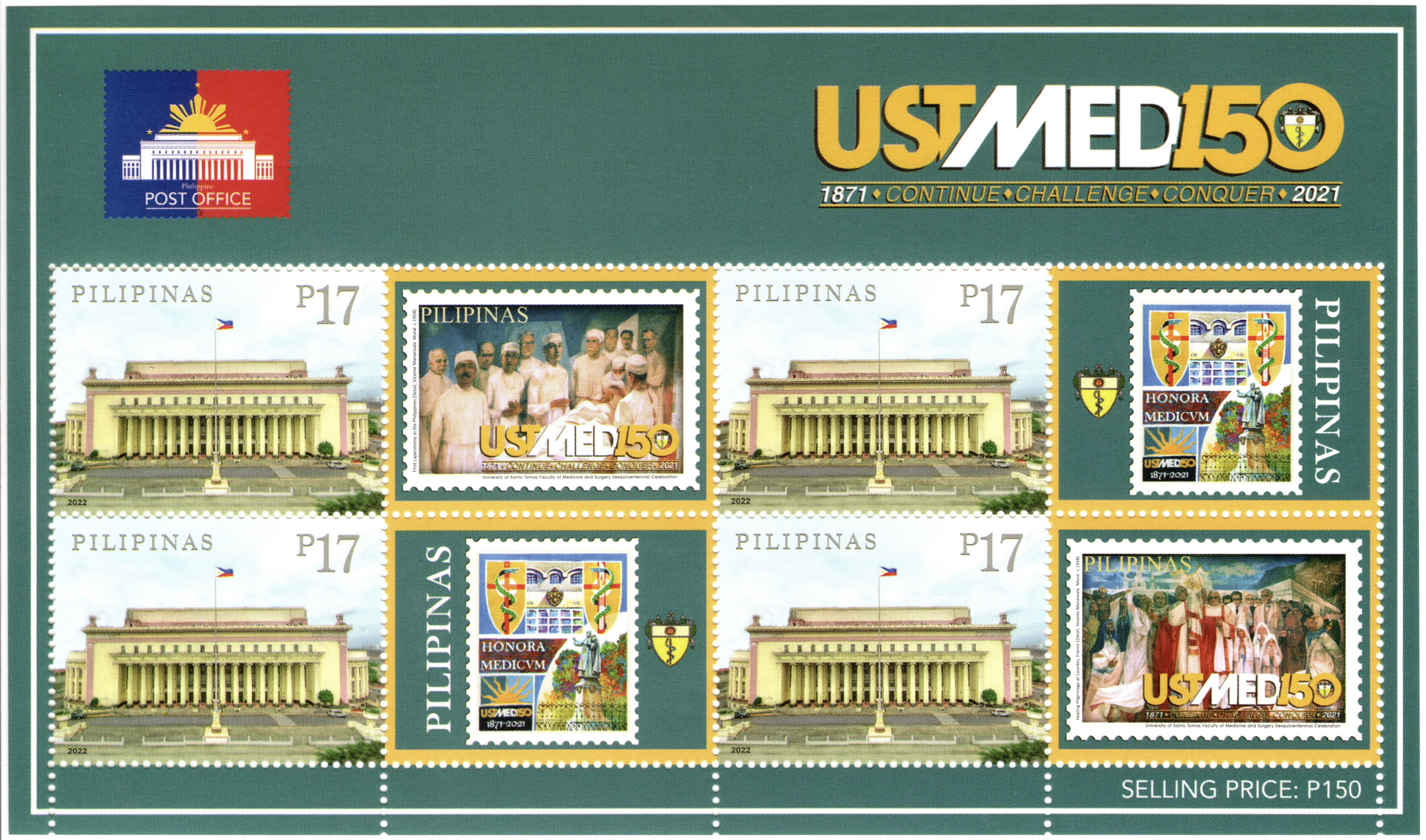

=== Pope John Paul II ===
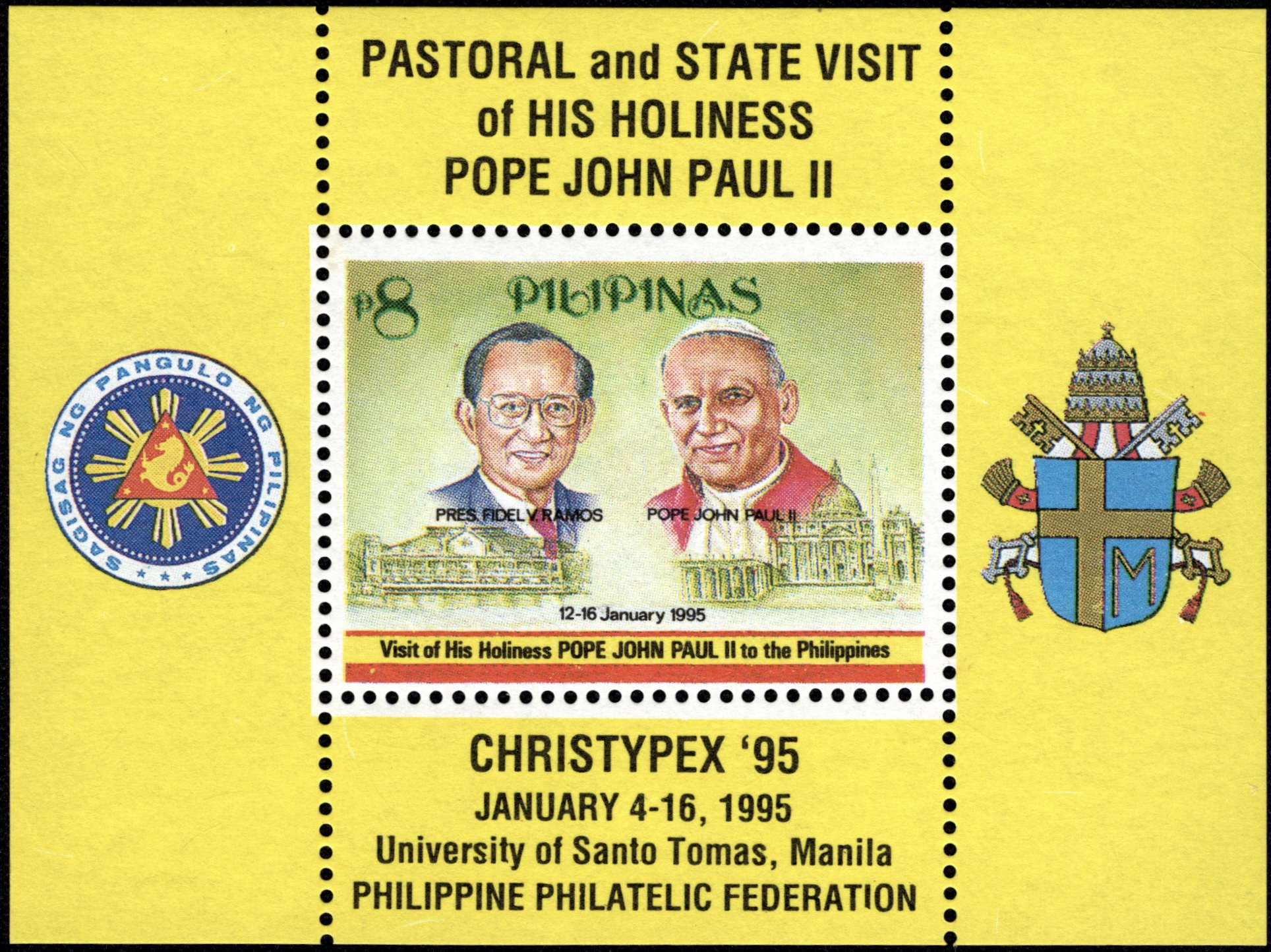
State visit of Pope John Paul II in the Philippines and the UST campus

The 2011 stamp features Pope John Paul II with the UST Main Building in the background. It depicts the beatification of the pope on May 1, 2011.

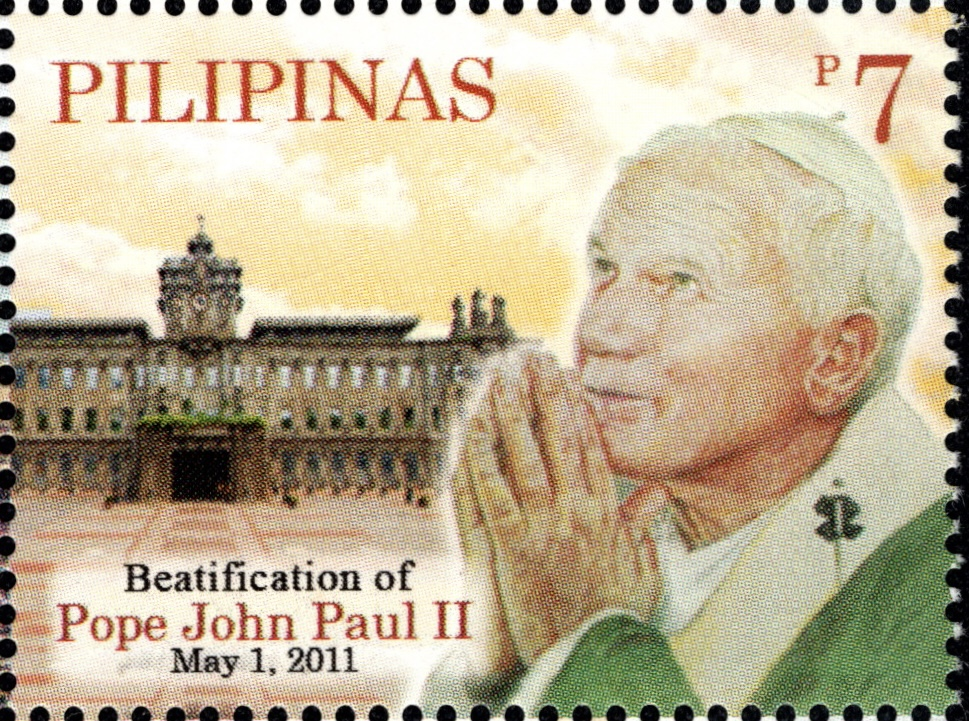
Beatification of Pope John Paul II featuring the UST Main Building.

=== Jose Rizal ===
Jose Rizal was commemorated on his birth centenary in 1961. The 5-centavo stamp depicts the UST and Ateneo de Municipal campuses in Intramuros while Rizal was still a student. The stamp is part of a commemorative set that includes a 6-centavo stamp that features Rizal's birthplace in Calamba, Laguna, a 10-centavo stamp that features his parents Teodora Alonso Realonda and Francisco Rizal Mercado and a 20-centavo stamp that features Rizal with Juan Luna and Félix Resurrección Hidalgo in Madrid, Spain.

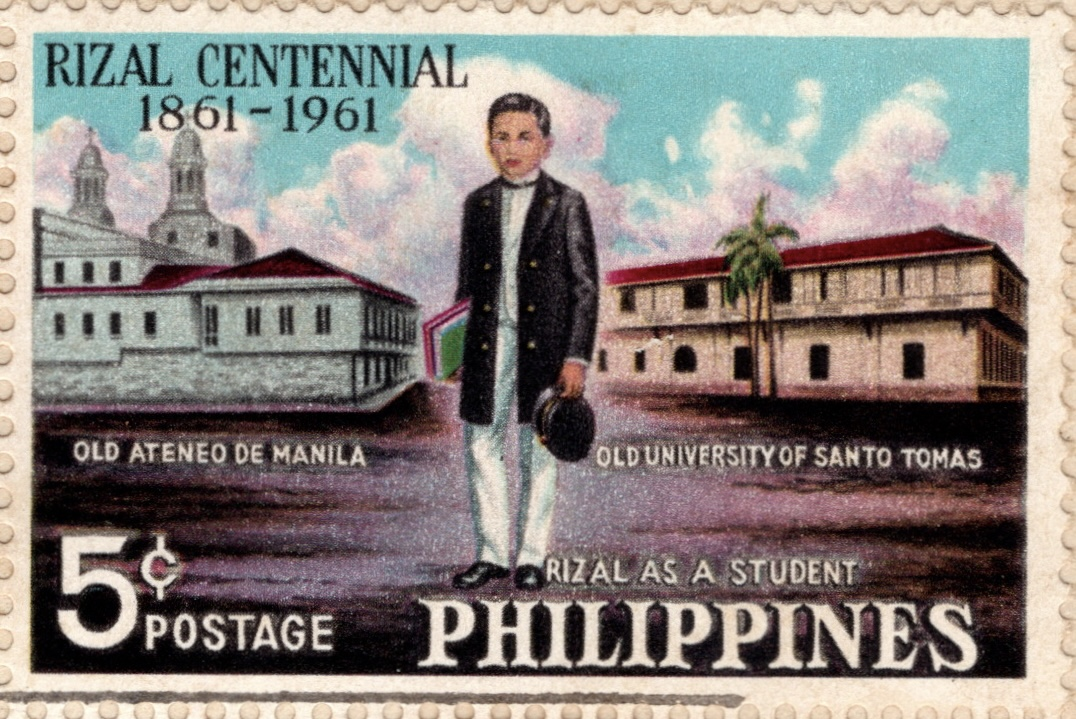

In the 1996 7th Asean Int. Philatelic Exhibition (Aseanpex '96), stamps were issued to feature the historical place during Jose Rizal's life. The 4-peso stamp depicts the UST building in Intramuros as part of the historical places during Jose Rizal's life.

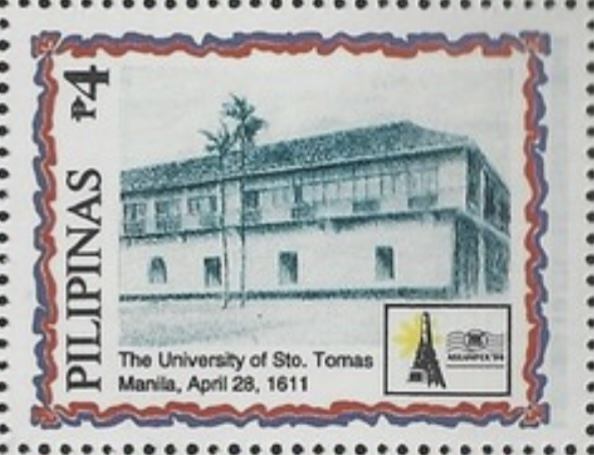
Historical places in the Philippines attributed to Jose Rizal

== Banknote ==
The Tongues of Fire, the UST Quadricentennial logo is featured as an overprint in the 200-peso note.

== Coins ==
=== UST Quadricentennial Anniversary of 2011 ===
The UST Alumni Association Inc. released three commemorative medallions made of nickel-brass alloy, silver-plated nickel-brass core, and 24K heavy gold-plated nickel-brass core. The medallion has an early design of the Thomasian Alumni Center on the reverse, and the UST Main Building and the Benavides Statue on the obverse. The design was made by UST College of Architecture and Fine Arts graduate Bayani Rumbaoa. He was the first Filipino to design the coins that were in circulation in the Philippines.

The university also issued two commemorative medals in gold and silver colors. The obverse shows the Miguel Benavides statue, the university name and its honorific titles, and the Latin words fides, spes, caritas (faith, hope, and love). The reverse shows the silhouette of the UST Main Building and the Tongues of Fire logo.
