= Minalungao National Park =

National park in the Philippines

- IUCN category V (protected landscape/seascape)
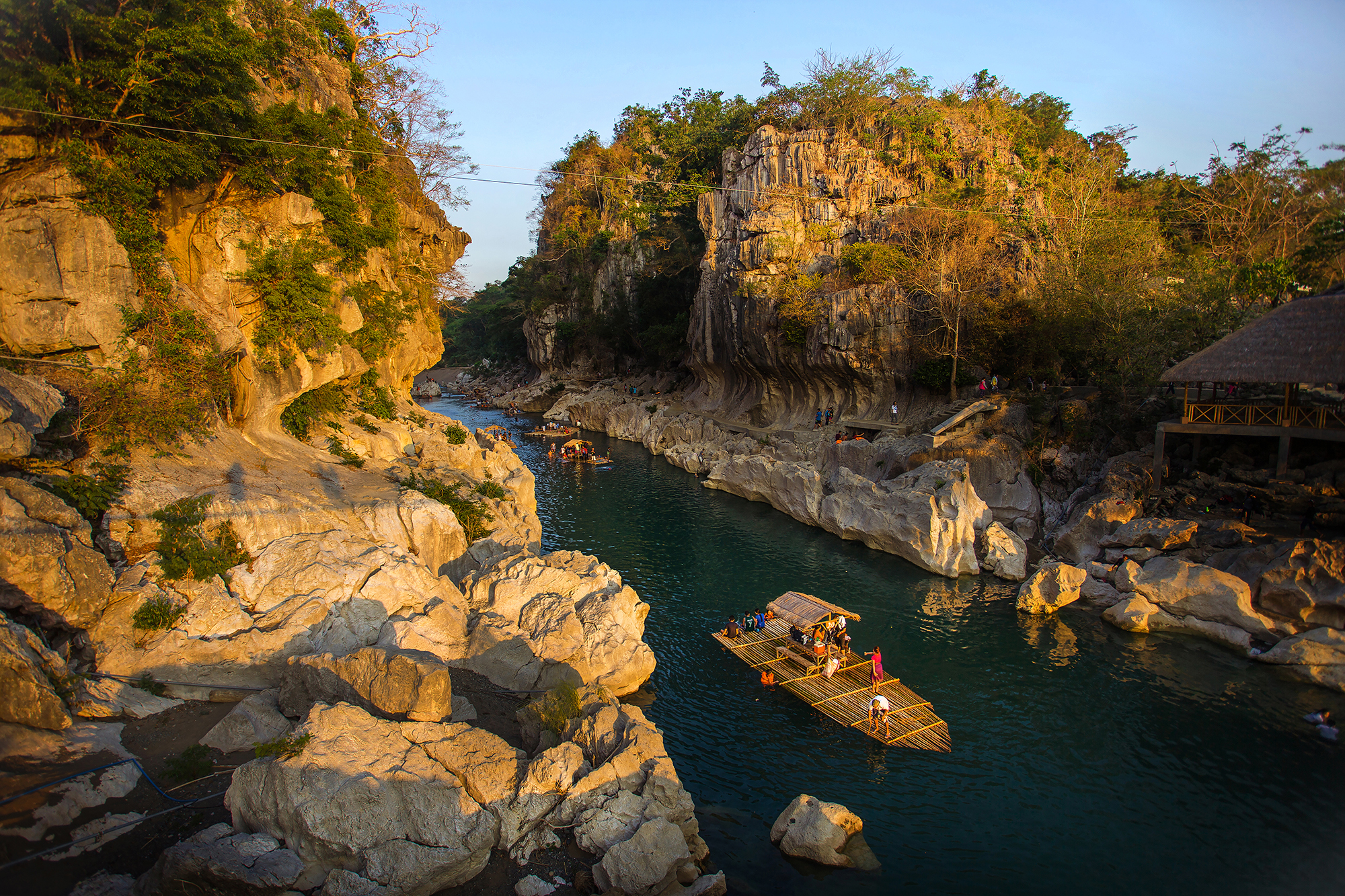
- Peñaranda River at the Minalungao National Park

- Location within Nueva Ecija Location within Luzon Location within Philippines
- Location: General Tinio, Nueva Ecija, Philippines
- Nearest city: Gapan, Nueva Ecija, Philippines
- Coordinates: 15°17′55.3″N 121°07′19.6″E
- Area: 2,018 hectares (4,990 acres)
- Established: June 11, 1967
- Governing body: Department of Environment and Natural Resources

Minalungao National Park is a protected area of the Philippines located in the municipality of General Tinio, Nueva Ecija, near its boundary with Doña Remedios Trinidad, Bulacan. The park covers an area of 2,018 hectares centered along the scenic Peñaranda River bordered on both sides by up to 16-meter high limestone walls in the foothills of the Sierra Madre mountain range. It was established in 1967 by virtue of Republic Act No. 5100.

The park is considered one of the few remaining natural environments in this region north of Manila. It is promoted by the local government as an ecotourism destination offering breath-taking scenery of green pristine river and unique rock formations. A system of unexplored caverns have also been identified as potential attractions. Facilities for picnics, swimming, fishing, raft riding and cliff diving have likewise been put up to draw more visitors.

== See also ==
- List of national parks of the Philippines
