= ZIP codes in the Philippines =

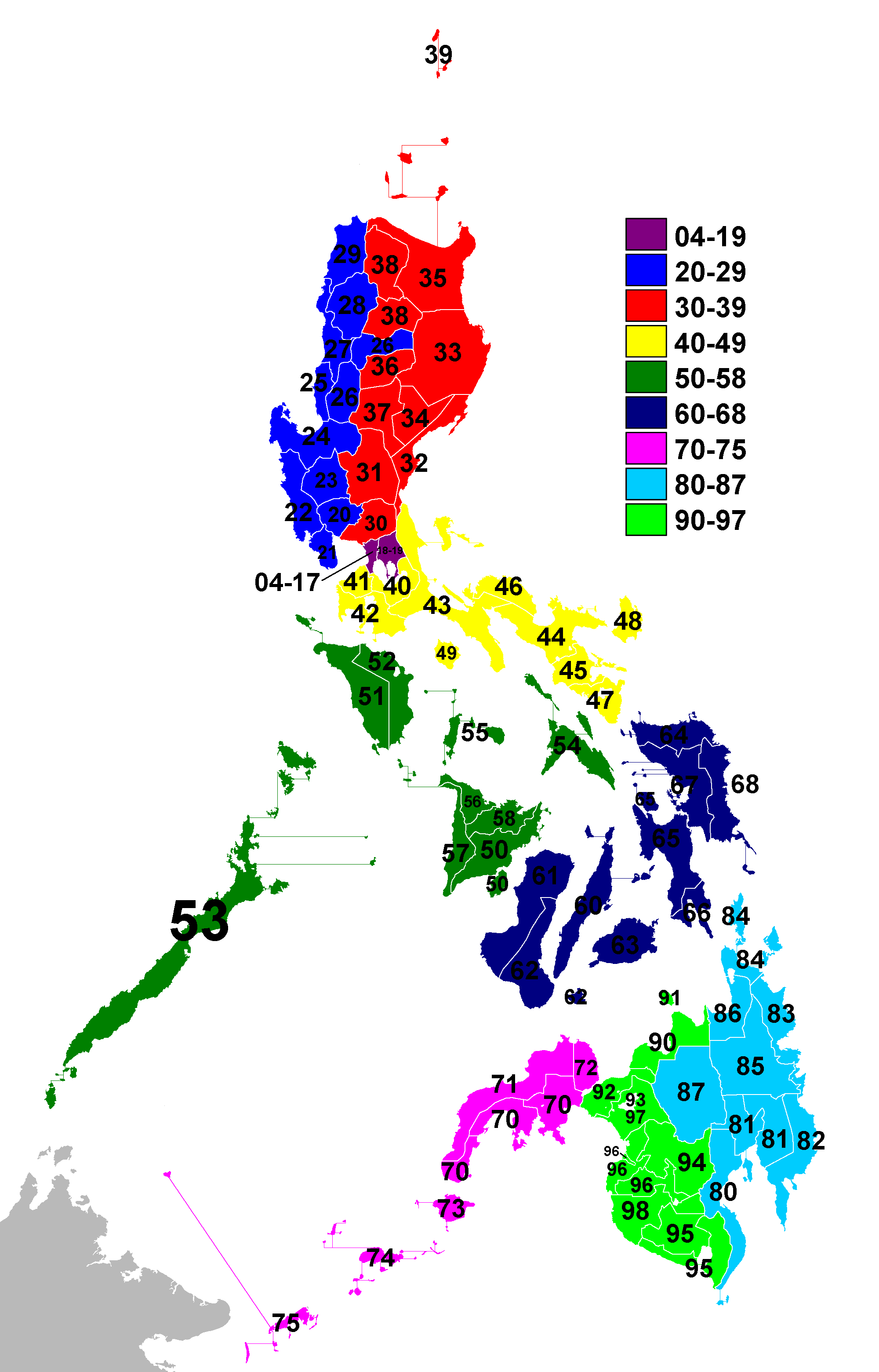
ZIP codes of provinces according to the first two numbers

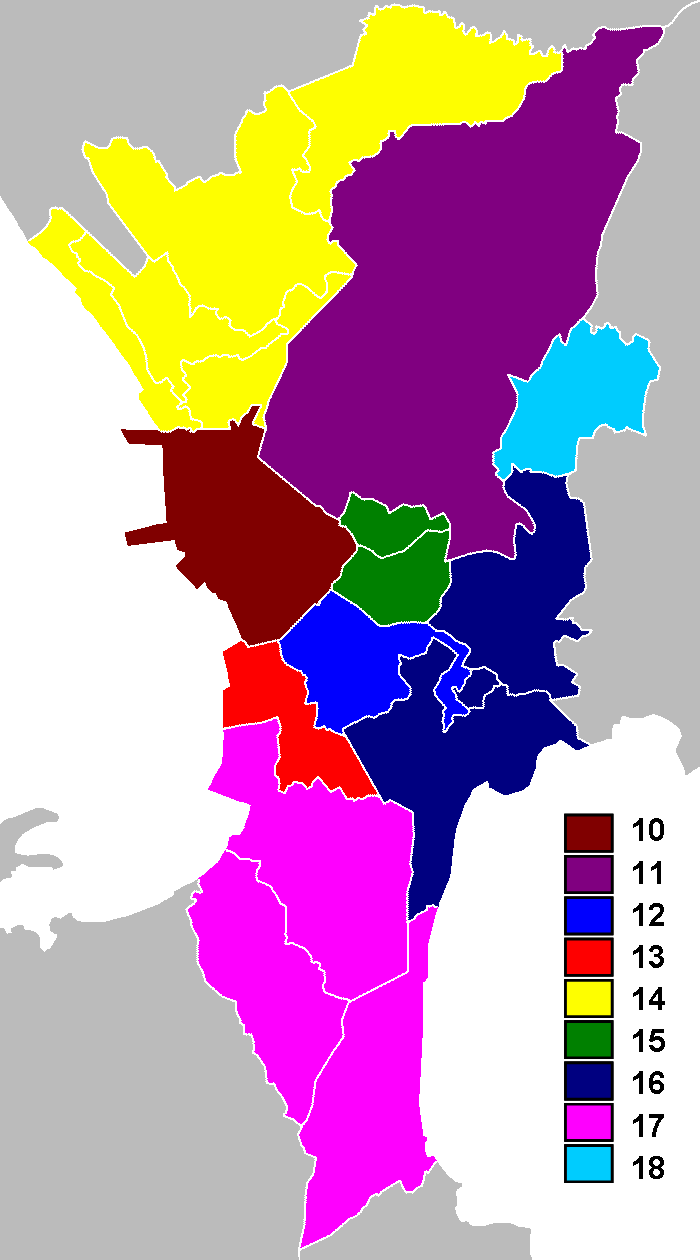
ZIP codes of cities and municipalities in Metro Manila according to the first two numbers

In the Philippines, a ZIP code is used by the Philippine Postal Corporation (PHLPost) to simplify the distribution of mail. While its function is similar to the ZIP Codes used in the United States, its form and usage are quite different. Its use is not mandatory but highly recommended by the PhlPost. A ZIP code is composed of a four-digit number representing a locality. Usually, more than one code is issued for areas within Metro Manila, and a single code for each municipality and each city in provinces, with exceptions such as:

- Davao City with eleven ZIP codes (8000, 8016 to 8026);
- Antipolo with six ZIP codes (1870 to 1875);
- Calamba (Laguna), Cavite City, Dasmariñas, Mabalacat, Mariveles, and the Island Garden City of Samal with three ZIP codes each; and
- Angeles City, Bacoor, Baguio, Bamban, Biñan, Capas, Floridablanca, General Tinio, Labo, Laur, Limay, Lipa, Los Baños, Lubao, Lucena, Majayjay, Muñoz, Palayan, Porac, Puerto Princesa, Sagay, San Jose del Monte, San Rafael (Bulacan), Santa Rosa (Laguna), Santa Rosa (Nueva Ecija), Silay, Sorsogon City, and Tagbina with two ZIP codes each.

Additionally, locations such as Basilio Fernando Air Base, Cesar Basa Air Base, Central Luzon State University, Clark Special Economic Zone, Mactan-Cebu International Airport, Francisco Bangoy International Airport, Laguna Technopark, Ninoy Aquino International Airport (NAIA), Manila Domestic Airport (NAIA Terminals 2 & 4), Philippine Military Academy, University of Mindanao, University of the Philippines Los Baños (College Los Baños), and Villamor Air Base have one code each.

A bill currently in the House of Representatives is set to expand the ZIP code from a four-digit numeric system to a seven-letter alphanumeric code, more clearly encoding the region, city, and barangay.

Originally, Philippine ZIP codes had five digits. The first digit represented the zone or region, the second and third represented the province, and the fourth and fifth digits represented the municipality or city where the post office was located. For example, Cebu City was 80201.

== See also ==
- Postal addresses in the Philippines
- Telephone numbers in the Philippines
