= General Tinio =

Municipality in Nueva Ecija, Philippines

- Municipality
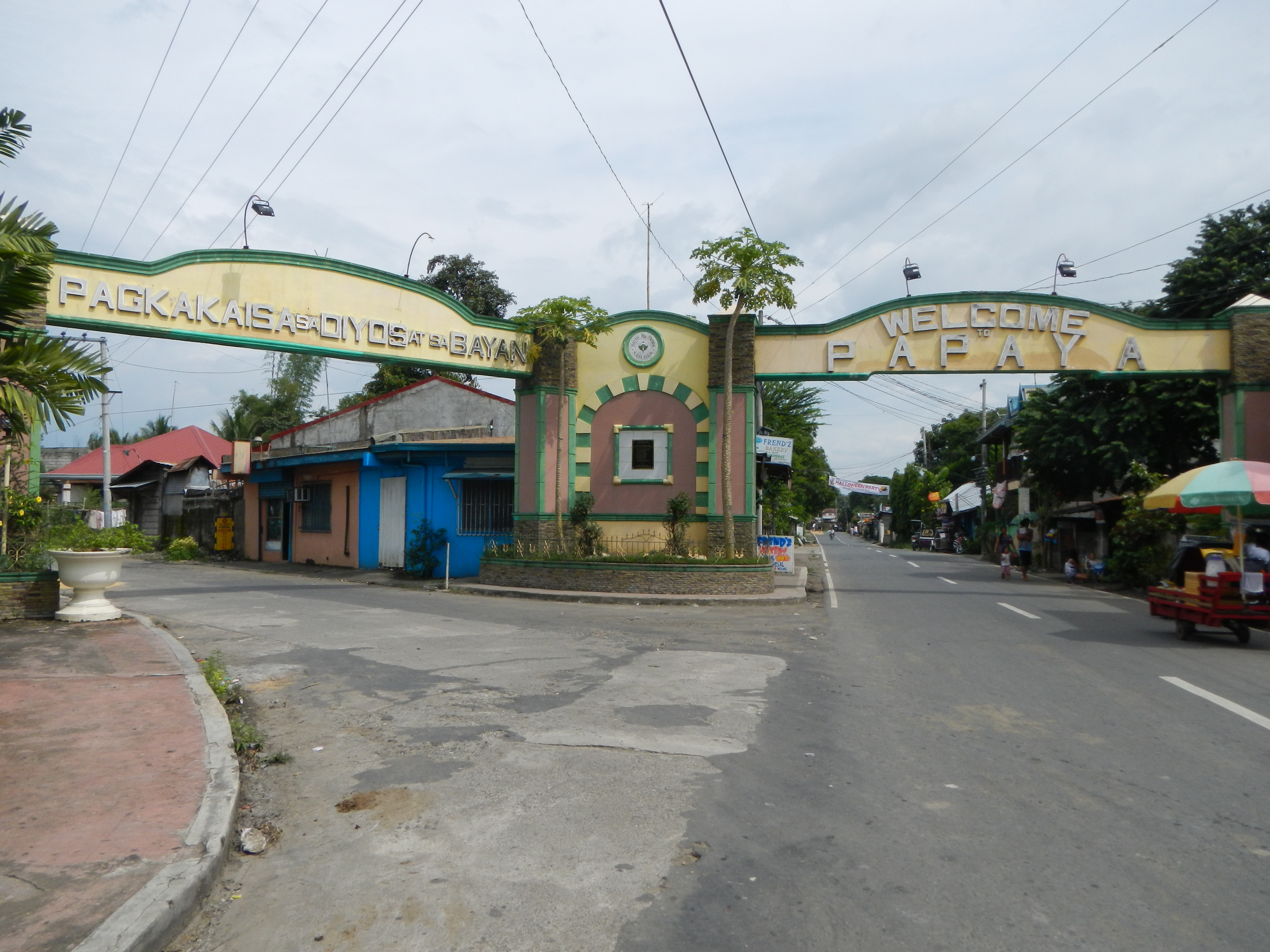
- Welcome Arch

- Seal

- Map of Nueva Ecija with General Tinio highlighted
- Interactive map of General Tinio
- Location within the Philippines
- Coordinates: 15°21′N 121°03′E
- Country: Philippines
- Region: Central Luzon
- Province: Nueva Ecija
- District: 4th district
- Founded: 1921
- Named for: Manuel Tinio
- Barangays: 13 (see Barangays)

Government
  - Type: Sangguniang Bayan
  - Mayor: Engr. Isidro T. Pajarillaga
  - Vice Mayor: Melvin S. Pascual
  - Representative: Emerson D. Pascual
  - Municipal Council: Members: June B. Abesamis; Ma. Charmaine Dayupay; Mario P. delos Santos; Eric E. Serrano; Luther A. Pajarillaga; Marvin G. Pajarillaga; Lazaro B. Gonzales; Maximo S. de Guzman
  - Electorate: 43,627 voters (2025)

Area
  - Total: 245.29 km^{2} (94.71 sq mi)
- Elevation: 56 m (184 ft)
- Highest elevation: 113 m (371 ft)
- Lowest elevation: 32 m (105 ft)

Population (2024 census)
  - Total: 58,093
  - Density: 236.83/km^{2} (613.40/sq mi)
  - Households: 13,137

Economy
  - Income class: 1st municipal income class
  - Poverty incidence: 10.44% (2023)
  - Revenue: ₱ 343.7 million (2024)
  - Assets: ₱ 620.5 million (2024)
  - Expenditure: ₱ 303.4 million (2024)
  - Liabilities: ₱ 245.5 million (2024)

Service provider
  - Electricity: Nueva Ecija 2 Area 2 Electric Cooperative (NEECO 2 A2)
- Time zone: UTC+8 (PST)
- ZIP code: 3104
- PSGC: 0304910000
- IDD : area code: +63 (0)44
- Native languages: Southern Alta; Tagalog; Ilocano
- Website: www.generaltinio.gov.ph

General Tinio, officially the Municipality of General Tinio (Tagalog: Bayan ng Heneral Tinio, Ilocano: Ili ti Heneral Tinio), is a first-class municipality in the province of Nueva Ecija, Philippines. According to the 2024 census, it has a population of 58,093 people. It was known as Papaya until 1957.

The town is at the foot of the Sierra Madre Mountains, adjoining the Fort Magsaysay Army Reservation on the northeastern side.

== History ==
According to the story passed on through generations, the town got its name because of a miscommunication between the natives and the Spanish colonizers. A native settler, when asked by a Spanish soldier, "Llama el pueblo?"(“what is the name of this town?”) replied, not understanding the Spanish language, "Papaya," referring to the particular fruit tree growing abundantly in the place. The name stuck with the Spanish colonizers, and the place from then on was called "Papaya."

Papaya was a sitio of Mapisong, which was then a barrio of Gapan. Mapisong became a town in 1851, changing its name to Peñaranda after Spanish engineer Jose Maria Peñaranda. Papaya became one of its barangays. Papaya became a town on January 1, 1921, through the collaborative efforts of Capitan Mamerto Padolina, who was then the Secretary of the Governor of the Province, Judge Segundo Bernardo, and Francisco Padolina.

Congressman Celestino Juan sponsored a congressional act changing the name of Papaya to General Tinio in honor of General Manuel Tinio, a revolutionary leader against the Spaniards who hailed from Nueva Ecija. The act was signed into law on June 20, 1957, as Republic Act No. 1665. The new name of the town was inaugurated days later, on August 19, 1957.

== Geography ==
=== Barangays ===
General Tinio is politically subdivided into 13 barangays. Each barangay consists of puroks and some have sitios.

- Padolina (Barangay 1)
- Concepcion (Barangay 2)
- Rio Chico (Barangay 3)
- Pias (Barangay 4)
- Nazareth (Barangay 5)
- Bago (Barangay 6)
- Poblacion West (Barangay 7)
- Poblacion Central (Barangay 8)
- San Pedro (Barangay 9)
- Sampaguita (Barangay 10)
- Poblacion East (Barangay 11)
- Pulong Matong (Barangay 12)
- Palale (Barangay 13)

=== Climate ===
Climate data for General Tinio, Nueva Ecija
Month	Jan	Feb	Mar	Apr	May	Jun	Jul	Aug	Sep	Oct	Nov	Dec	Year
Mean daily maximum °C (°F)	29 (84)	30 (86)	31 (88)	34 (93)	33 (91)	31 (88)	30 (86)	29 (84)	29 (84)	30 (86)	30 (86)	29 (84)	30 (87)
Mean daily minimum °C (°F)	20 (68)	20 (68)	20 (68)	22 (72)	24 (75)	24 (75)	24 (75)	24 (75)	24 (75)	23 (73)	22 (72)	21 (70)	22 (72)
Average precipitation mm (inches)	4 (0.2)	4 (0.2)	5 (0.2)	11 (0.4)	66 (2.6)	99 (3.9)	127 (5.0)	113 (4.4)	99 (3.9)	84 (3.3)	35 (1.4)	14 (0.6)	661 (26.1)
Average rainy days	2.2	1.9	3.2	5.3	16.1	20.8	23.5	22.8	22.2	16.5	8.9	3.5	146.9
Source: Meteoblue

== Demographics ==
Population census of General Tinio
Year	Pop.	±% p.a.
1939	7,517	—
1948	8,645	+1.57%
1960	14,925	+4.65%
1970	19,353	+2.63%
1975	21,088	+1.74%
1980	23,406	+2.11%
1990	29,491	+2.34%
1995	32,913	+2.08%
2000	35,352	+1.54%
2007	39,356	+1.49%
2010	42,634	+2.95%
2015	47,865	+2.23%
2020	55,925	+3.33%
2024	58,093	+0.92%
Source: Philippine Statistics Authority

== Economy ==
Poverty incidence of General Tinio (%)

Source: Philippine Statistics Authority

Farming is the livelihood of the majority of the residents. Even though the municipality is located at the foot of the Sierra Madre Mountain Range, the topography is generally ideal for agricultural products such as palay and vegetables. A number of poultry broiler contract growers are also located in the municipality. Other industries include furniture and fixtures, backyard poultry, cattle and livestock, vegetable production, and minor agricultural livelihoods such as duck raising.

The remittances of numerous sons and daughters of Papaya abroad also help keep the economy of the town afloat. Papayanos can be relied to answer calls of assistance for the town's development.

Minalungao National Park is also one of the biggest attractions in the town, catering to numerous visitors each day.

== Government ==
=== Local government ===
The following have led the town from its birth in 1921 to what it had become today.

Cristobal Mangulabnan	Vice Martin Ramos	1921–1922
Getulio Bote, Sr.	Vice Martin Pajarillaga	1922–1925
Martin Pajarillaga	Vice Marcos Bote Sr.	1925–1931
Marcos Bote Sr.	Vice Daniel Padolina	1931–1934
Melquiades Ronquillo, Sr.	Vice Santiago Bolisay	1934–1937
Mayor	Vice Mayor	Term
Melquades Ronquillo, Sr.	Vice Damaso Bolisay	1937–1940
Getulio Bote	Vice Pedro Bulacan	1940–1944
Getulio Bote	Vice Angeles Bote	1945
Republic Era
Gerardo Rivera	Vice Angeles Bote	1946–1947
Gerardo Rivera	Vice Diosdado Bote	1948–1951
Gerardo Rivera with	Victorino Bote	1952–1955
Bienvenido B. Abes	Vice Victorino Bote	1956–1959
Gerardo Rivera	Vice Banaag Leodones	1960–1963
Santos Bote	Vice Getulio Bote, Jr.	1964–1967
Mariano Ronquillo	Vice Manuel Domingo	January 1–15, 1968
Manuel Domingo	Vice Perfecto M. Bote	1968–1971
Nicanor B. Aves	Vice Alfonso Pajimna	1972–1980
Nathaniel Bote, Jr.	Vice Venancio Bote	1981–1986
OIC Gerardo Rivera	Vice Antonio Abes	1986–1988
Placido M. Calma	Vice Bernardino R. Abes	1988–1995
Placido M. Calma	Vice Elsa Bote	1995–1998
Placido M. Calma	Vice Bernardino R. Abes	1998–2004
Isidro Tinio Pajarillaga	Vice Indira P. Dayupay	2004–2007
Virgilio A. Bote	Vice Marcelo B. Abes	2007–2010
Virgilio A. Bote	Vice Engr. Ferdinand P. Bote	2010–2016
Engr. Ferdinand P. Bote	Vice Atty. Melvin S. Pascual	2016–2018
Atty. Melvin S. Pascual	Vice Anna Rouselle Busalpa	2018-2019
Isidro Tinio Pajarillaga	Vice Atty. Melvin S. Pascual	2019–2025
Sherry Ann Bolisay	Vice Atty. Melvin S. Pascual	2025–present

== Education ==
The Gen. Tinio Schools District Office governs all educational institutions within the municipality. It oversees the management and operations of all private and public educational institutions ranging from primary to secondary schools.

=== Primary and elementary schools ===
- Bago Elementary School
- BC Achievers' Integrated School
- Bethany Ecumenical School
- Bulak Primary School
- Christian Lights Academy
- Gawad Kalinga Community Elementary School
- Gen. Tinio Central School
- Gen. Tinio East Central School
- Gen. Tinio West Central School
- Gethsemane Christian School
- Greenland Elementary School
- IEMELIF Learning Center
- Mapedya Elementary School
- Minalungao Elementary School
- Nazareth Elementary School
- Padolina Elementary School
- Palale Elementary School
- Patindig-Araw Elementary School
- Pias Elementary School
- Rio Chico Elementary School
- Sibug Elementary School

=== Secondary schools ===
- General Tinio National High School
- Irenea Integrated School
- Leonor M. Bautista High School
- Lino P. Bernardo National High School
- Pagtalunan High School
- Palale High School
- Rio Chico National High School

=== Higher educational institution ===
- St. Anthony Center of Science and Technology

== Culture ==
Roman Catholic is the most prevalent religion, with Iglesia ni Cristo, IEMELIF, Baptist, Methodist, and others attracting its own followers. The town's patron saint, the Santo Cristo or the Holy Cross is feted every May.

The town is best known for having the most number of brass bands in the Philippines with 15 organized bands. The Family Band has won national brass band competition titles in categories including majorette exhibitions, solo flute, solo clarinet, solo trumpet, and French horn.

The town also has other places of interest, notably the Minalungao National Park, which is a favorite swimming destination in the summer, especially during Black Saturday when it is usually filled with local bathers and visitors. Minalungao, literally meaning "mine of gold in a cave", houses several caves which can explored. The river also has a portion where a stone ledge located about 15 meters high from the river can be used as spring board.

A Papaya Festival is also commonly celebrated, coinciding with the municipality's Foundation Anniversary. Parades of different school students around the town would wear colourful costumes inspired by the fruit, which was the area's name prior to the change in 1957.

== Gallery ==
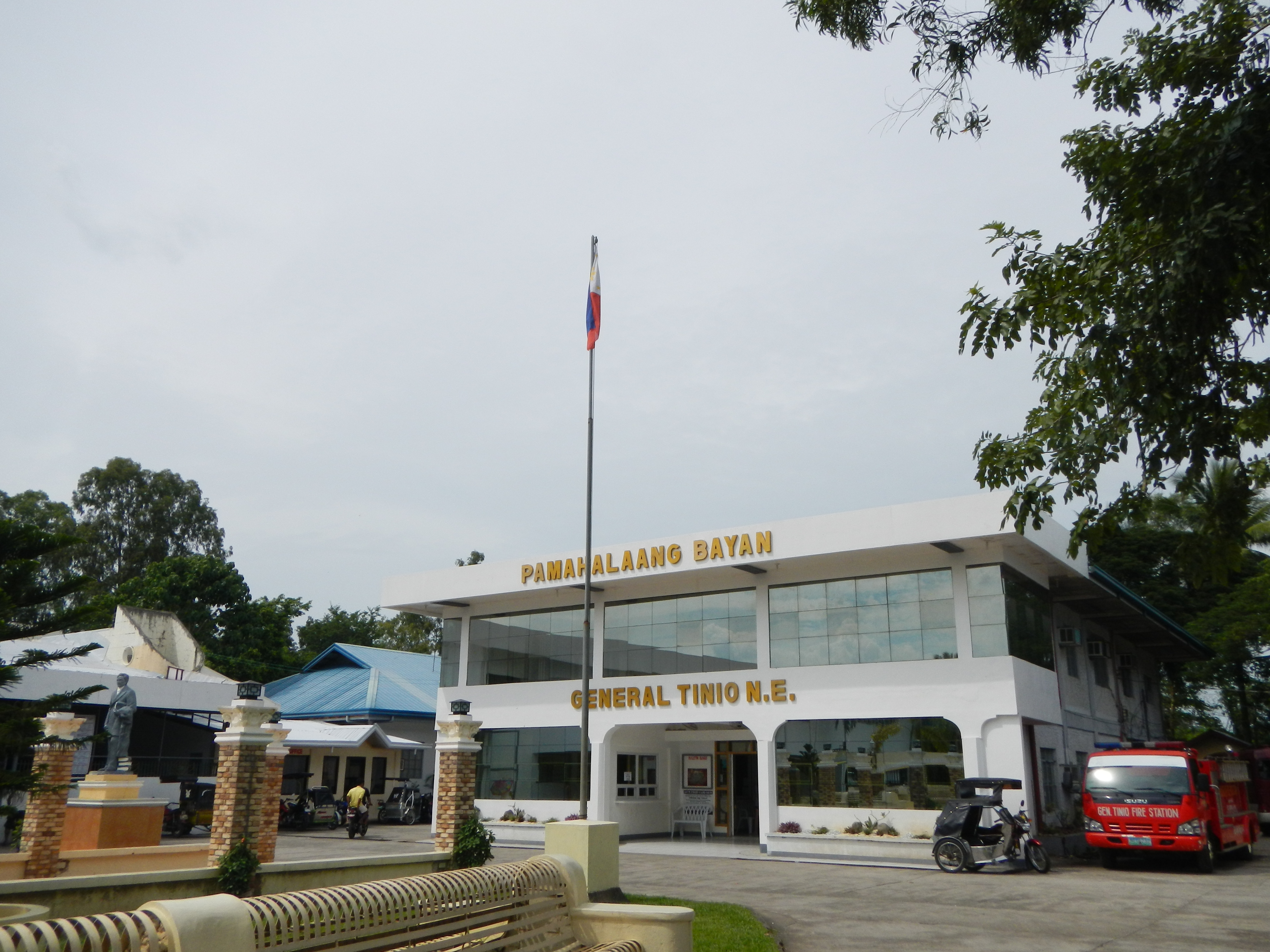
Town hall

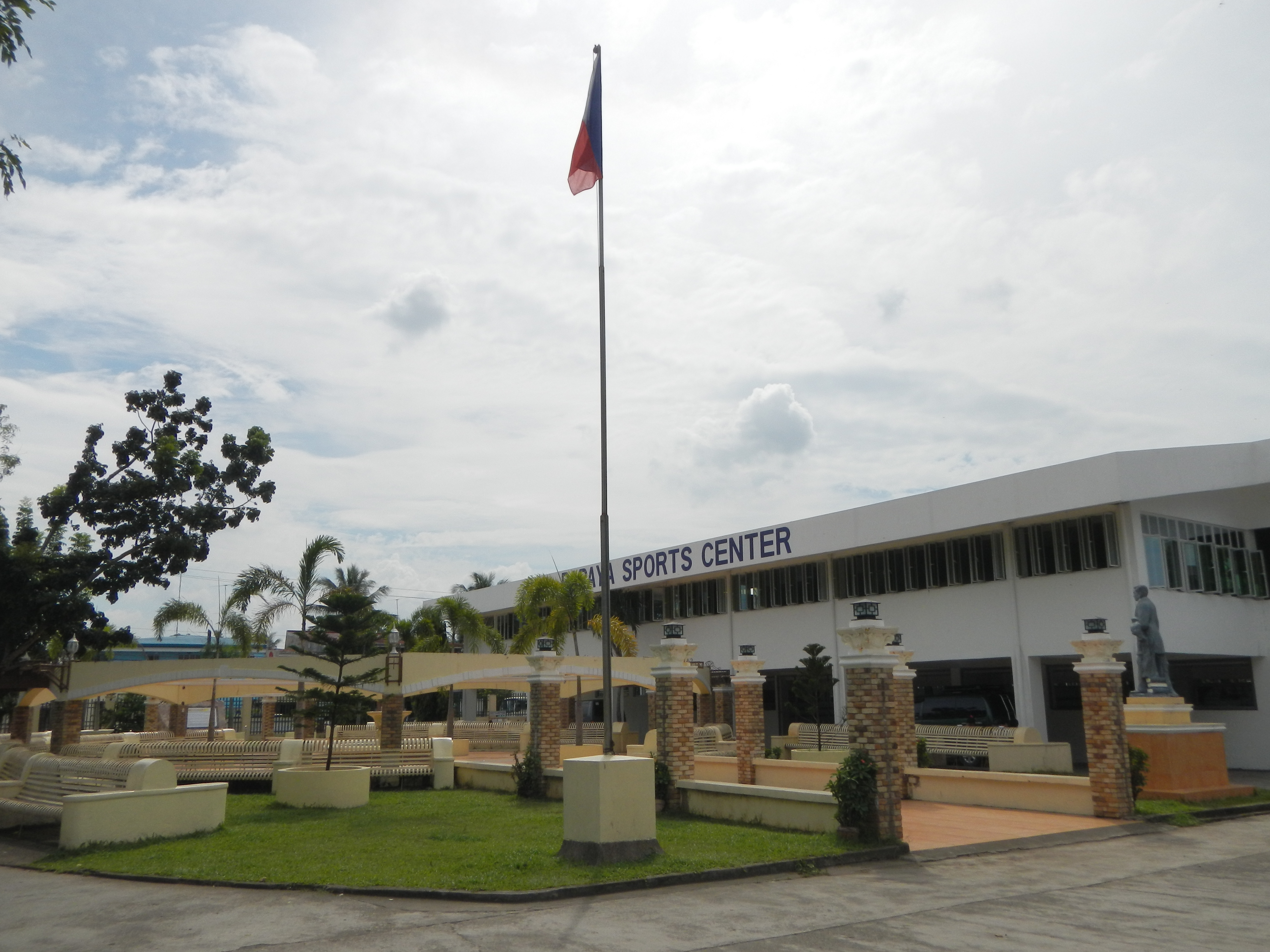
Sports center

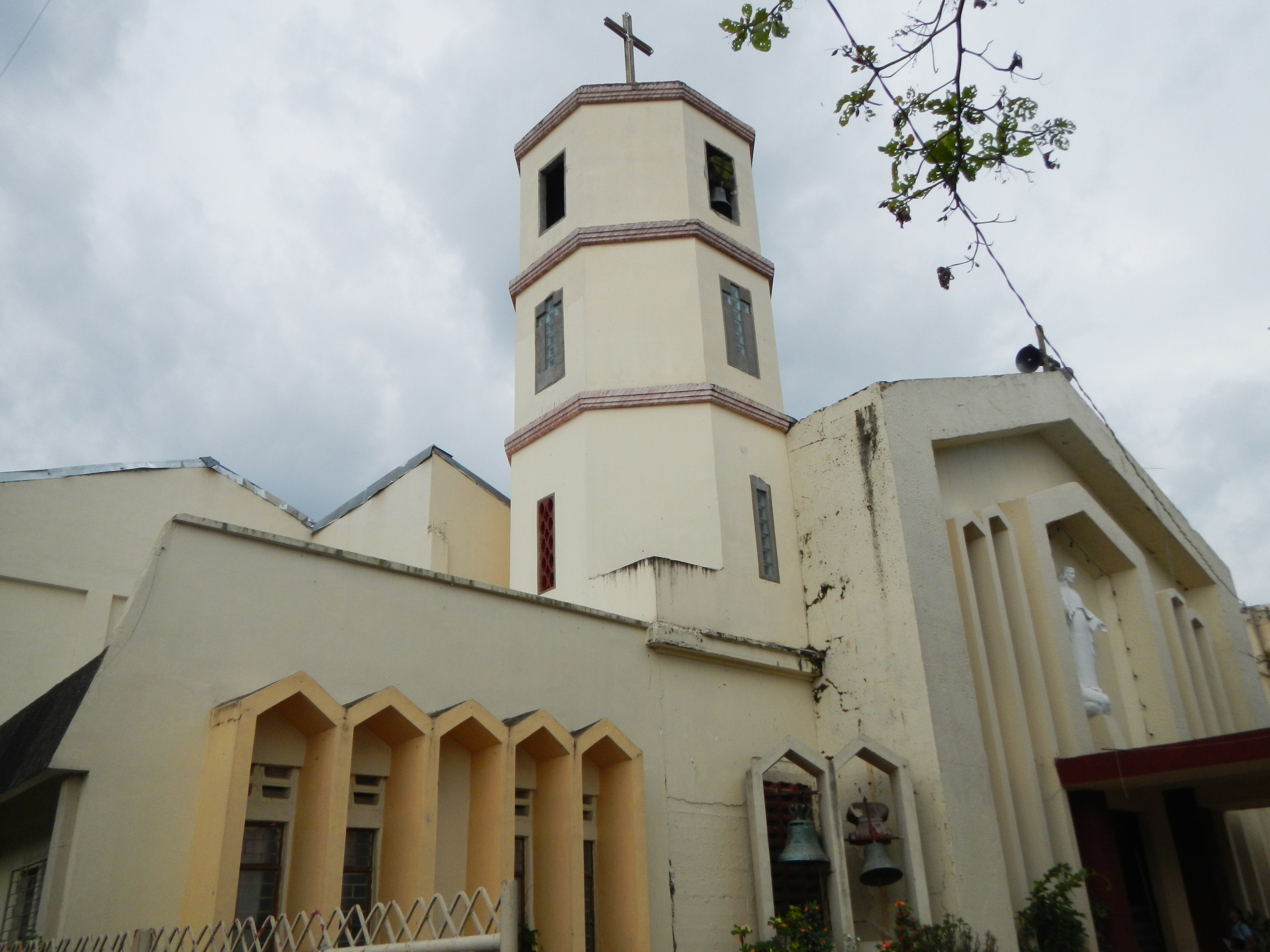
Old Santo Cristo Parish Church

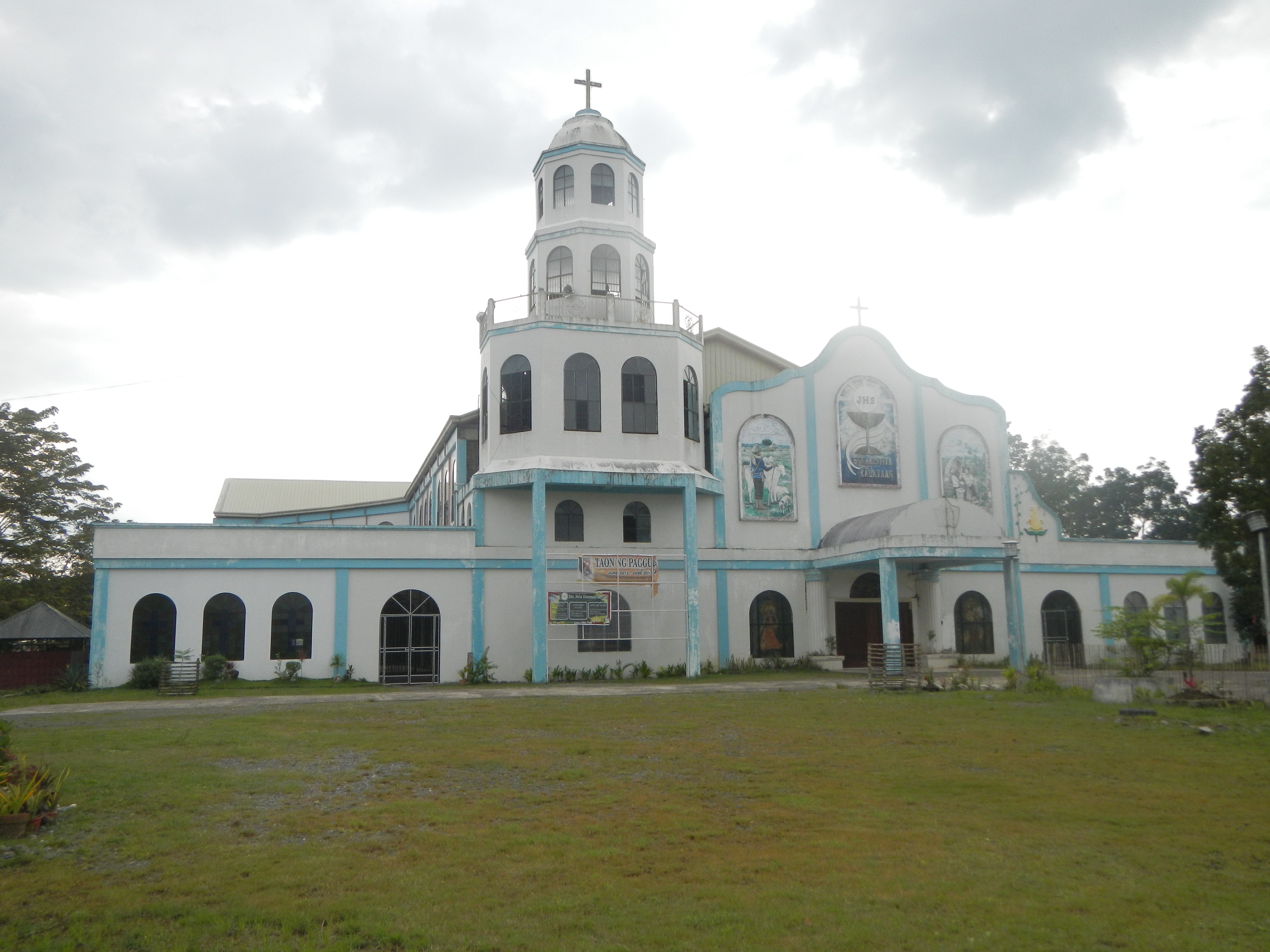
New Holy Cross Parish Church

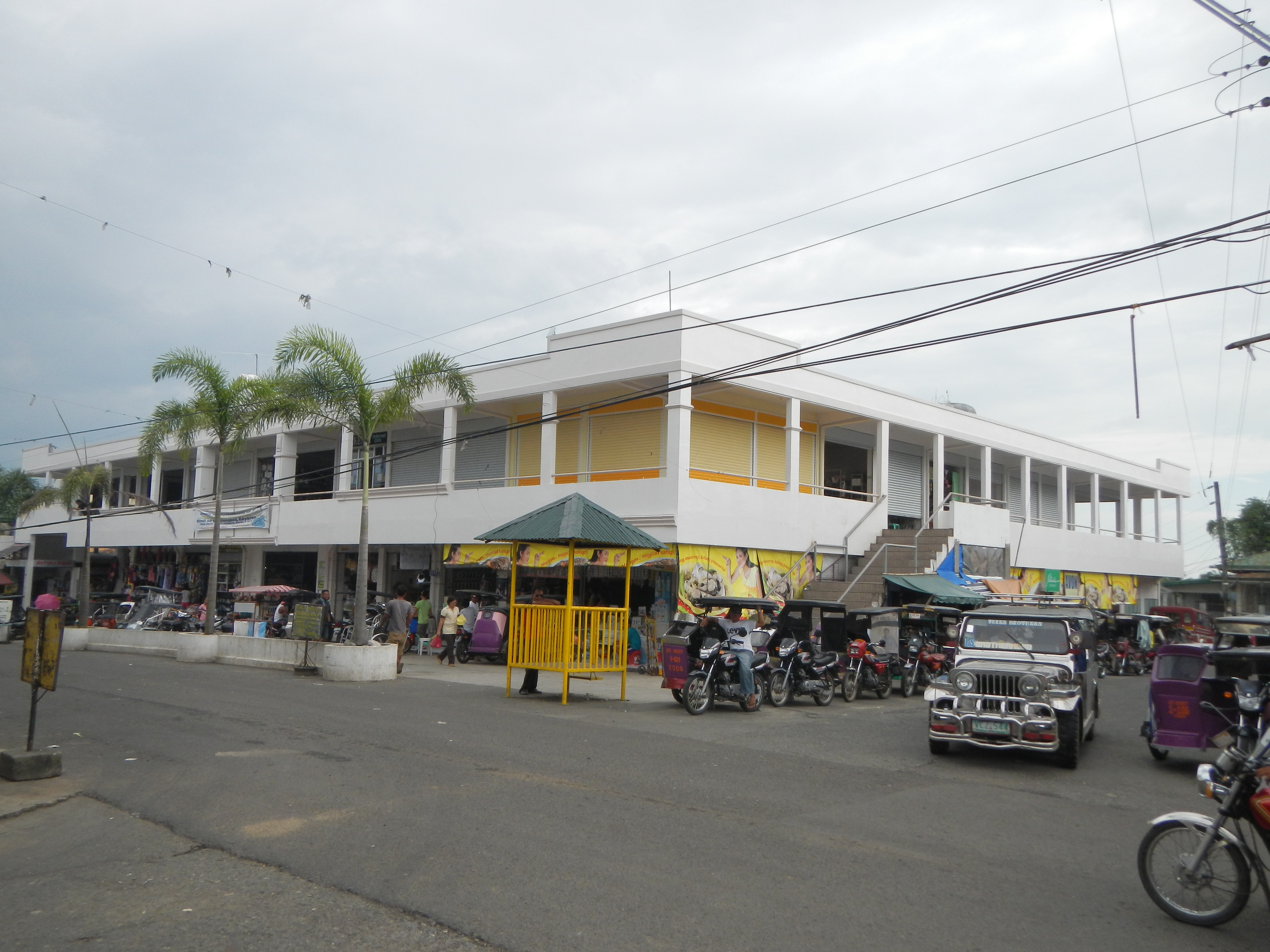
Public market

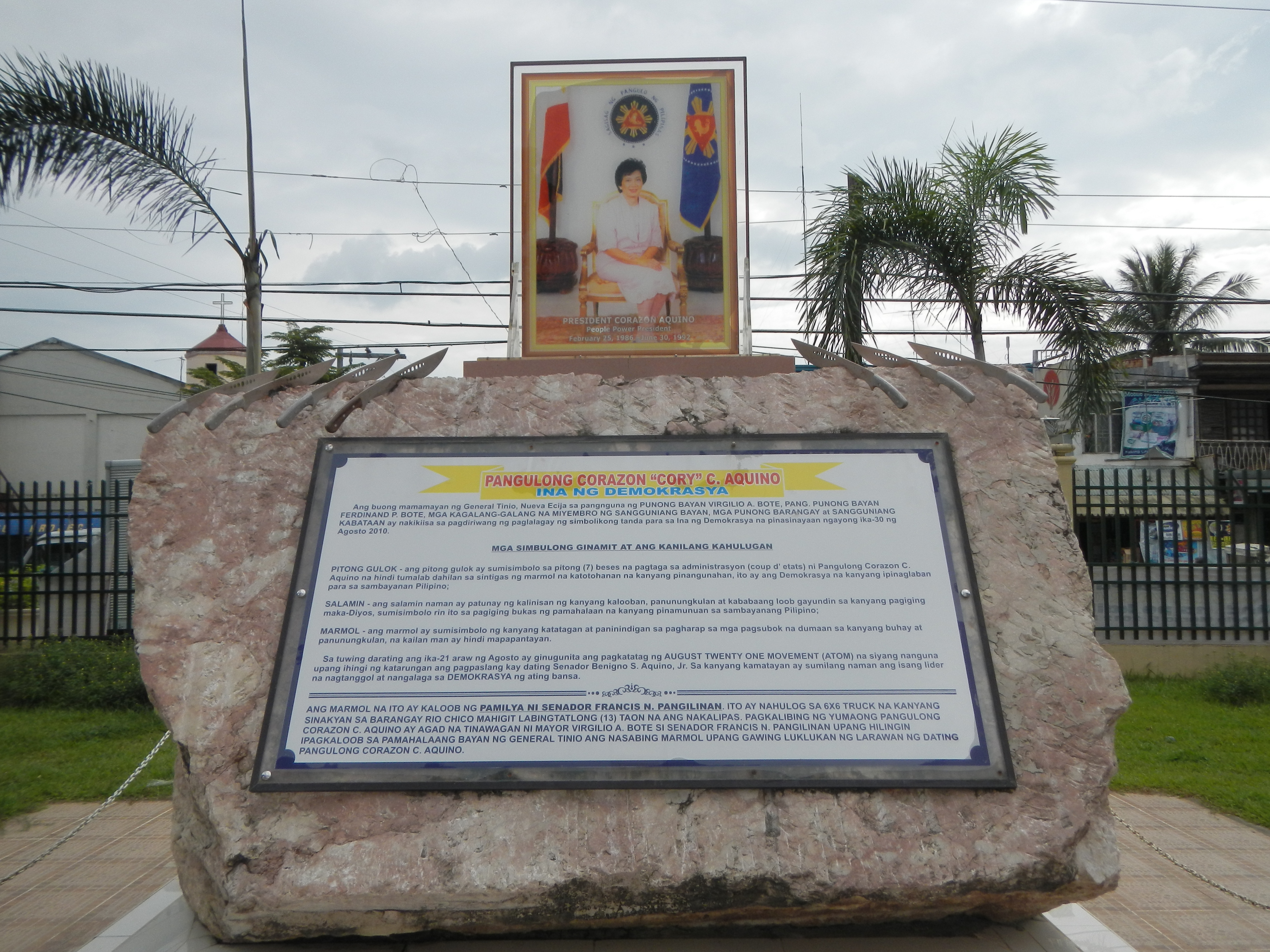
Cory Aquino memorial

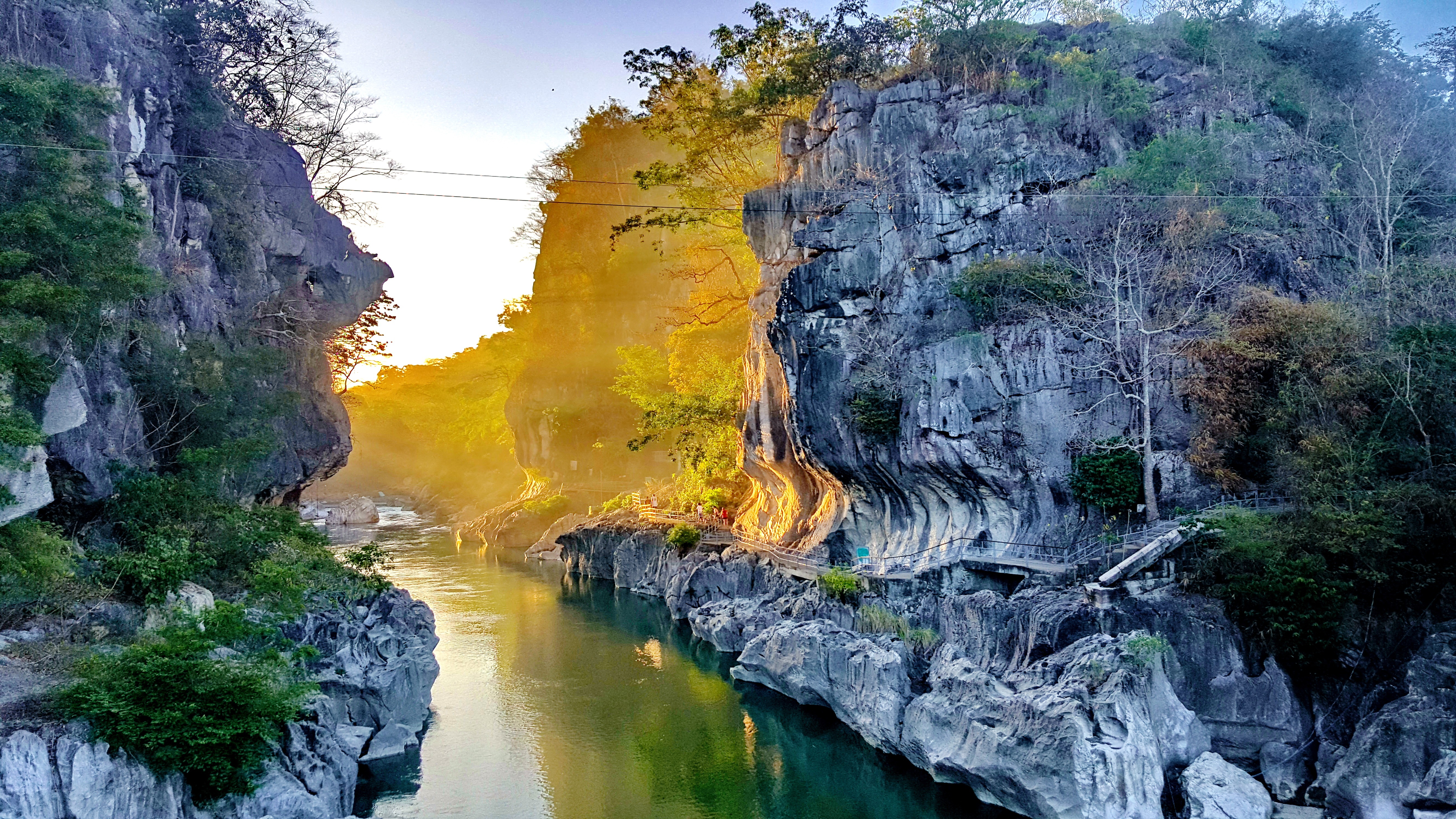
Minalungao National Park

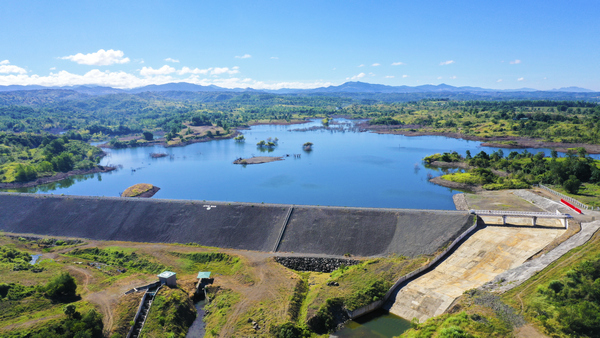
The Upper Tabuating Dam at Brgy. Nazareth

== See also ==
- List of renamed cities and municipalities in the Philippines
