= Upper Tabuating Dam =

Dam in Nueva Ecija, Philippines

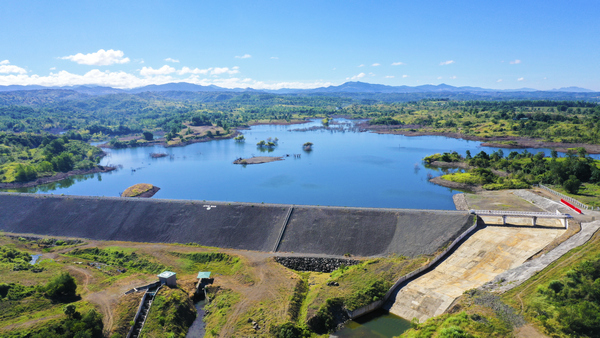
- View of the dam towards the south

- Location in Nueva Ecija Location in Luzon Location in the Philippines
- Country: Philippines
- Location: Barangay Nazareth, General Tinio, Nueva Ecija
- Coordinates: 15.393153°N 121.117017°E
- Purpose: Multi-purpose
- Status: Operational
- Construction began: 2010 (Irrigation component); February 2015 (Dam component)
- Opening date: December 2020
- Construction cost: PhP 878 Million
- Owner: National Irrigation Administration

Dam and spillways
- Type of dam: Earth fill dam
- Impounds: Tabuating River
- Height: 25.56 metres (83.9 ft)
- Length: 760 metres (2,490 ft)

Reservoir
- Total capacity: 4,960,000 cubic metres (4,020 acre⋅ft)

The Upper Tabuating Dam is a multi-purpose earth-fill dam located at Barangay Nazareth, General Tinio, Nueva Ecija in the Philippines. It is located at the upstream of Tabuating River near the border of General Tinio with Fort Magsaysay in Palayan.

Inaugurated in May 2021, it is part of the Upper Tabuating Small Reservoir Irrigation Project (UT-SRIP) of the National Irrigation Administration (NIA) of the Philippines which was designed for tourism, aquaculture, cash crops and power generation.

== Background ==
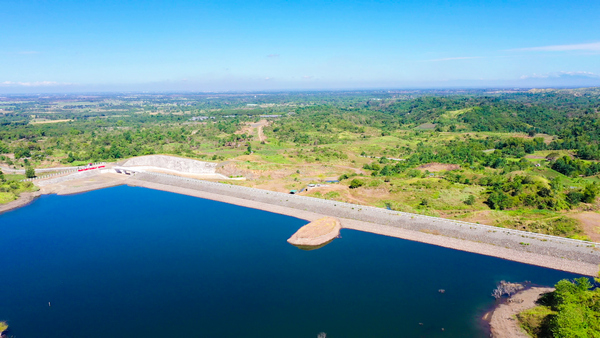
The Upper Tabuating Dam looking northeastwards, with Fort Magsaysay in the center

The construction of the irrigation component of the project started in 2010 but was suspended after the opposition of then General Tinio mayor Virgilio Bote. In February 2015, NIA lifted the suspension of the construction after Bote agreed to continue the project. In the same month, the dam component of the project was started. In June 2019, 3,000 narra and mahogany seedlings were planted in the dam's watershed as part of Sierra Madre reforesting efforts. The irrigation system's dry run was conducted from December 2020 until May 2021 which produced 91,182 sacks of rice in its service area.

The project was inaugurated on May 25, 2021 which provides irrigation for 700.87 hectares (1,731.9 acres) of agricultural land, cultivated by at least 223 farm families living in barangays of Bago, Nazareth and Rio Chico in General Tinio, and barangay San Mariano (Maugat) in nearby Peñaranda town. Some 12,000 tilapia fingerlings were also released in the dam's reservoir which has a total capacity of 4,960,000 cubic metres (4,020 acre⋅ft).

== See also ==
- Agriculture in the Philippines
- Energy in the Philippines
- Water supply and sanitation in the Philippines
