= Postage stamps and postal history of the Philippines =

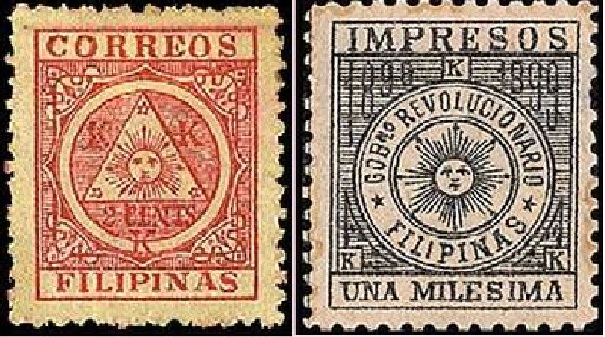
First Philippine Republic stamps

This is a survey of the postage stamps and postal history of the Philippines.

== History ==
=== Origin ===
In 1767, the first post office was established in Manila, which was later organized as a postal district of Spain, encompassing Manila and the Philippine archipelago, in 1779. The postal district was reestablished on December 5, 1837. Manila became known as a leading center of postal services within Asia. Spain joined the Universal Postal Union in 1875, which was announced two years later.

During the Philippine Revolution, President Emilio Aguinaldo ordered the establishment of a postal service. It was later organized as a bureau under the Department of Trade and Industry, then known as the Department of Trade, on September 5, 1902. The Philippines joined the Universal Postal Union as a sovereign entity, on January 1, 1922.

=== The pre-stamp era ===
During the early Spanish regime, exchange of letters and communications was limited to those belonging to government officials and Catholic Church officials. Letters, communications and documents were carried by badageros who rendered free services to the colonial government. Badageros either hiked or rode on horseback in dispatching the early postal service from "Tribunal (town hall) to tribunal or to the "Casa Real" (provincial capital).

The badageros were also called Polistos, classified as male citizens over 18 years who did not hold a public office like the Gobernadorcillo (Mayor), Teniente primero y segundo (vice-mayor), the Juez, Cabesas (councilors), the Commesarios and Cuadrillos (Policeman) and Escribanos (clerks). Badageros performed their courier services by rotation. Two badageros were assigned every day at the Tribunal to be relieved the next day. If letters or communications were urgent, the badageros had to go and dispatch them even at midnight.

Armed guards (Polistos) were posted at the outskirts of every poblacion and when challenged by the guards at night, the couriers responded with badageros and the guards would allow them to pass. Upon delivery to the next tribunal, the recipient was required to sign on a booklet to show receipt like special delivery/registered mail. Important papers such as appointments from the Capitan General (Governor General), were receipted with signatures of the appointees and others present as witnesses.

Envelopes were unknown during early times. Letters, communications, and document sheets were just folded. Secrecy in the mails was not practiced. A letter or communication might change hands many times depending upon the number of Poblaciones between the origin and the destination. In some cases, it took from one to two months before a communication reached the recipient.

Adhesive postage stamps were apparently not issued in the Islands before 1854, but the existence of a postal service was clearly evident. On the titles and official duties of one Capitan General Don Felix Berenguer De Marquina, who executed a documentary appointment in 1791, his titles and duties were listed, viz "Brigadier De La Real, General de estas Islas Filipinas, Presidente de su Real Audencia y Caancelleria, Director General de las Tropas de S.M. en estos Dominion, Superentendente General Subdelegado de Real Hacienda, y Renta de Correo".

No personnel expenses were necessary to maintain this system, as badageros rendered their services free to the Colonial Government.

A letter postmarked August 11, 1843, in Madrid was received and cancelled in Manila on April 13, 1844, or a matter of 245 days.

=== First stamps ===
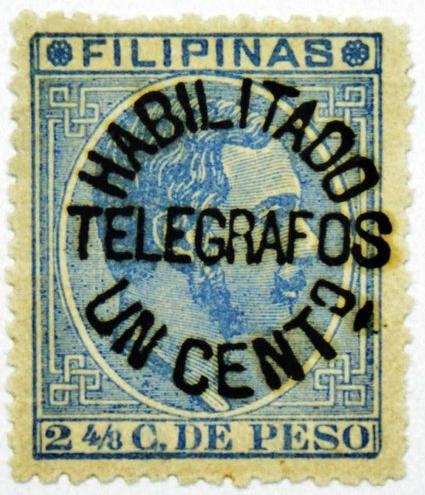
An 1887 telegraph stamp of the Philippines

On December 7, 1853, Spanish Governor General Antonio de Urbiztondo ordered the establishment of prepaid postage for all mail, beginning 1 February 1854.

The first stamps were issued that day in four denominations: the 5 quartos, the 10 quartos, the 1 real, and the 2 reales. These stamps depicted a profile of an effigy of Spanish Queen Isabela II.

Up to 1872, the stamps used in the islands were identical with those issued in other Spanish colonies. In that year the first distinct Philippine postage stamp was issued. It bore the figure of Spanish King Amadeus and the words "Correos Filipinas". Three years later, a new set of stamps were issued. They bore the figure of King Alfonso XIII. In 1891, postage stamps showing the picture of Alfonso XIII as a child of about three years and the word "Filipinas" were issued. These were the last ones to be circulated by the Spanish Government until its fall in 1898.

During the Spanish period stamps were in some instances pasted on the upper left hand corner of the cover.

Stamp sellers received a commission from their sales as shown by the following provisions of Urbiztondo's order: "The chief of the province in charge of the issuance of stamps and the Administrator of the Estancadas of Tondo with the consent of the superintendent are given 10% commission on the sales of stamps as remunerations and to cover the expenses that they may incur in the performance of their work, labor, and the consequent responsibilities".

Postal authorities tolerated the practice of splitting large denomination stamps into two stamps of a lower value. A local philatelist, for instance, owns an envelope postmarked in Manila on July 6, 1857 and addressed to one S.D. Felino Gil of Guagua, Pampanga. The envelope bore on its upper left hand corner a 10 quartos stamp cut diagonally to serve as a 5 quartos stamp.

=== Revolution ===
When Filipinos revolted against Spain in 1898, their Revolutionary Government issued its own stamps. The stamp was triangular in shape.

The rebels issued in all 14 different stamps. The regular varieties included stamps for registration, for newspapers, seven for revenues and two for telegrams. The stamps soon lost their relationship to specific items. A letter sometimes carried two or more stamps.

Following the occupation of the Philippines by the United States as a result of the Spanish–American War, the American military government issued regular stamps overprinted with the word "Philippines", for postal purposes. Stamps issued on June 30, 1899, were used up to August 1906, when the American civil government that supplanted the military began to use the "Philippine Islands-United States of America" series. Pictures of famous Filipinos, Americans and Spaniards, like Rizal, President McKinley, General Lawton, Admiral Sampson, Washington, Franklin, Carriedo, Magellan, and Legaspi were portrayed on the new stamps.

=== Airmail ===
On April 4, 1919, a pioneering American flyer by the name of Ruth Law made an exhibition flight over Manila. In honor of the occasion, special cards were cancelled by the Bureau of Posts, thus inaugurating the first airmail service in the Islands.

When Spanish aviator Edwardo Gallarza and Joaquín Loriga arrived in Manila on May 13, 1926, from Madrid in their airplane after a trip of 39 days, postal authorities commemorated the event by overprinting the 1917-1927 regular issues with the words "Airmail Madrid Manila 1926". These were the first airmail stamps.

The first regular airmail stamps were released on June 30, 1941. These stamps showed a giant clipper flying over an open sea across which a Moro Vinta sails peacefully.

=== World War II ===
Upon the outbreak of World War II Manila, which had been declared an open city, was easily captured by the Empire of Japan who entered it on January 2, 1942. On March 4, the Imperial Japanese resumed mail service. At first they released so-called "provisional" or "emergency issues". They were seven of the pre-war Commonwealth stamps approved by their censors with the words "United States of America and Commonwealth" overwritten in black.

Recognizing the propaganda value of stamps and psychological value of their designs, the Imperial Japanese authorities carefully chose the motifs of the stamps they issued. In their postage series released on April 1, 1943, the Japanese portrayed typical Philippines scenes. These issues had four basic designs. One showed a typical "bahay kubo" with palm trees behind it. Another pictured a Filipino woman planting rice. A third depicted a Moro vinta sailing in the open sea. The last stamp was a "hybrid", showing Mt. Mayon and Mt. Fuji together. Between them was a rising sun and at their base were palm trees.

On the inauguration of the puppet Second Philippine Republic, the Imperial Japanese issued a commemorative stamp showing a Filipina in native dress. To her left side was the Philippine flag and to her right was the Rizal monument at the Luneta. A string of pearls served as its border and beneath it was a broken chain. In their further bid for the cooperation and friendship, the Japanese tried to arouse their patriotic fervor. On the 72nd anniversary of the martyrdom of Fathers Burgos, Zamora, and Gomez, a national hero series was issued by the Japanese. These portrayed Rizal, Burgos, and Mabini. Placing this trio of Filipino heroes on postage stamps was a first in Philippine philately. The last stamps issued by the Japanese were the Laurel issue, which showed President Laurel in inaugural attire. Above him was the seal of the Republic and below was a farmer plowing a field with a carabao.

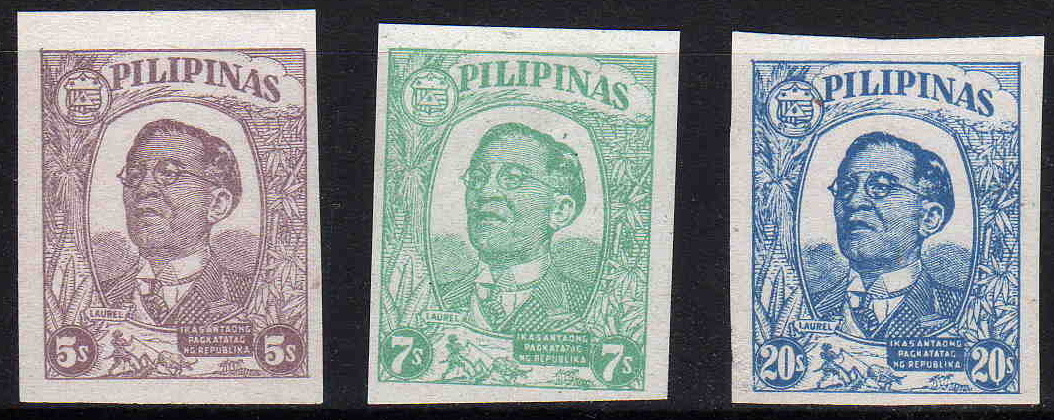
1945 Philippine stamps

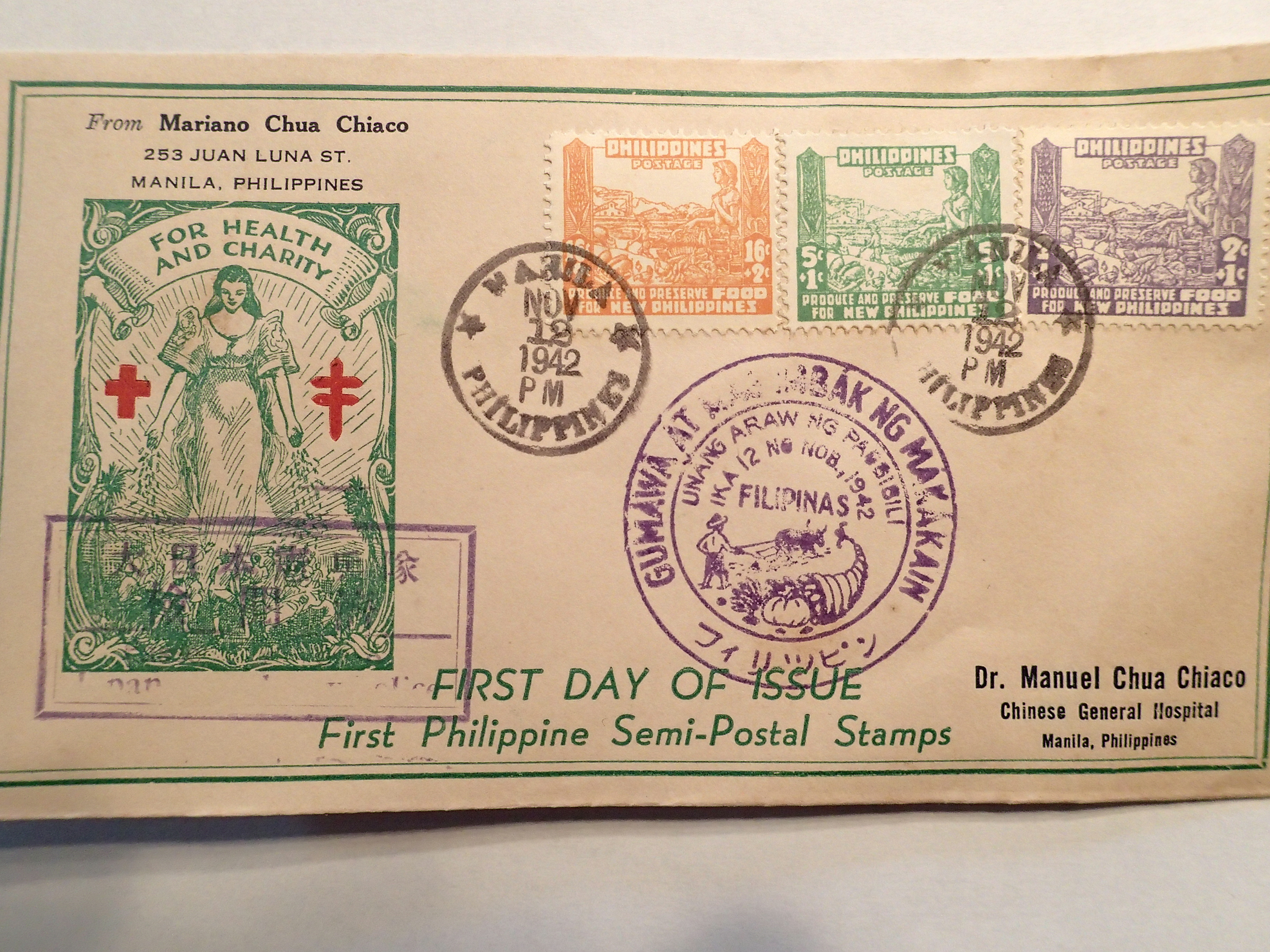
First Philippine semi-postals

The Japanese occupation also marked the issuance of the first Philippine semi-postal stamps. Semi-postal stamps are those issued for the dual purpose of paying postage and raising revenue for other government activities, mostly charitable ones. These stamps were prepared by the Commonwealth Government, but due to the war were not released as planned. Their original object was to raise revenues for National Defense, but when the Japanese released them on November 12, 1942, their theme was changed to Food Production.

In spite of the pro-Filipino flavor of these stamps, the people disdained to use them and especially in the Visayas and Mindanao used a guerrilla stamp, the mere possession of which could have cost them their lives. Some of these stamps were printed in Australia and brought to the Philippines by submarines. They were used in guerrilla correspondence and in communication to the United States. These stamps came in one denomination – 2 centavos. They bore the words "Free Philippines – Guerilla Postal Service – Two Centavos Series 1943".

On October 20, 1944, American forces landed on the shores of Leyte. Nineteen days later, the Post Office of Tacloban was reopened amidst the still smoking ruins. The stamps were pre-war Commonwealth stamps overprinted with the word "Victory" using a rubber stamp.

=== The Third Republic ===
The inauguration of the Third Philippine Republic on July 4, 1946, was commemorated by a stamp showing a Filipino woman in native dress with a crown of laurel and holding in her hands the Philippine Flag. In the background were the flags of all the nations. The stamp, therefore, not only symbolizes the independence of the Philippines but also heralded her new role in the great family of the nations.

Indicative of the growing stature and importance of the young Republic in the affairs of the world were the various stamps issued in honor of the international conventions and exhibitions held in the country, like the Conference of the United Nations Economic Commission in Asia and the Far East (ECAFE) held in Baguio on November 24, 1947. The Conference of the United Nations Food and Agricultural Organization (FAO) held also in Baguio on February 23, 1948, the 5th World Congress of Junior Chamber International (JAYCEE) held in Manila on March 1, 1950, the Fourth Meeting of the Indo Fisheries Council held in Quezon City on October 23, 1952 and First Pan Asian Philatelic Exhibition (PANAPEX) held in Manila on November 16, 1952.

The new special delivery stamp issued on December 22, 1947, pictured the Philippines' progress. The old stamp portrayed a postal messenger jogging against the background of Mt. Mayon, the new stamp showed a mail messenger riding on a bicycle to deliver a letter. In the background may be seen the Manila Post Office Building.

The Philippines commemorated on her stamps the two Americans who helped rid the Philippines of the Japanese invaders: Douglas MacArthur and Franklin Delano Roosevelt. The last objects that President Roosevelt touched before his sudden death were Philippine stamps, as documented in Roosevelt in Retrospect by John Gunther.

== Stamps ==
=== Design error ===
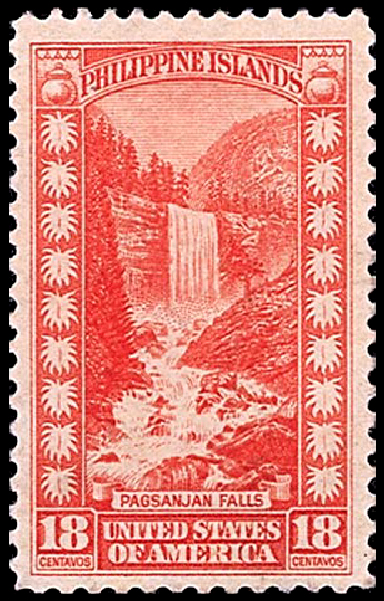
A 1932 Philippine stamp supposedly depicting Pagsanjan Falls. A printer substituted a picture of Vernal Falls in California resulting in this significant error.

In 1932 an error in a Philippine stamp caused a mild sensation in the philatelic world. The Philippines issued an 18 centavo stamp depicting Pagsanjan Falls. American newspaperman Ernest A. Kehr noticed the similarity between the falls shown on the stamp and that of another one in California. He communicated his suspicions to Lowell Thomas, the famous radio commentator. When the latter checked the matter in Washington, D.C., he was informed by the authorities that what had been reproduced on the stamp and labeled Pagsanjan Falls was in reality Vernal Falls, in Yosemite, California.

=== Historic events stamps 1935 ===
On February 15, 1935, stamps depicting historical events were first issued. A set of pictorial stamps showing fourteen different scenes were released. The 10 cent Fort Santiago, the 16 cent Magellan, the 30 cent Blood Compact, the 1 peso Barasoain Church and the 2 peso Battle of Manila Bay commemorated unforgettable chapters in the Filipino history.

=== Commonwealth government ===
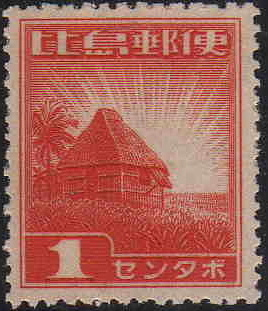
A 1943 stamp for the Japanese occupation of the Philippines

Upon the inauguration of the Commonwealth government on November 15, 1935, stamps were overprinted with the word "Commonwealth". These stamps outlived the Commonwealth, the coming of the Japanese invaders, the return of the American liberation forces, and the birth of the Third Philippine Republic.

=== Controversy ===
The stamp honoring the 33rd International Eucharistic Congress held in Manila on February 3 to 7, 1937, was the most memorable. As envisioned by the postal authorities, the stamp depicted a chalice with the Sacred Heart above it and a grape vine and stalks of wheat for its border.

When Bishop Aglipay, supreme head of the Philippine Independent Church, heard of it, he promptly filed a writ of prohibition with the Court of First Instance of Manila and later with the Supreme Court to prevent the sale of these stamps. He alleged that their sale would violate the Constitution, which prohibited the appropriation of any public money for the use, benefit or support of any sect, church or system of religion. According to Bishop Aglipay the stamps were propaganda for the benefit of the Catholic Church.

Although the bishop lost his suit, the government changed the stamp's design. The ultimate stamp showed a map of the Philippines with rays radiating all around it. Manila, the seat of the congress was indicated by a star.

=== Centenary ===
To commemorate the centenary of the first postage stamps issued, the postal authorities issued a series of special stamps. In the center of the stamp is an exact replica of the first stamp issued, the 5 Quartos carmine showing a profile of an effigy or Queen Isabela II of Spain, On its left side Magellan lands on Philippine shores. He holds in his left hand a flag and his upraised right hand a sword. Directly behind him is a priest holding aloft a cross and followed by two soldiers. In the background are 16th century Spanish ships. On the right side of the stamp is a picture of a Filipino woman in native dress, holding a Philippine flag. In the background is the Manila Post Office Building and a mail carrier. Flying above them is a large airplane.

=== Longest usable stamp ===
In December 2024 PHLPost, the Philippine Post Office, issued a Christmas stamp described as the longest usable postage stamp measuring 234mm x 40mm. The postage stamp design features 9 historical churches from Binondo to Antipolo along the Pasig River that the stamp honours along with several churches along it path.

== Timeline ==
- 1767 – The first post office was established in Manila.
- 1779 – The country became a postal district of Spain.
- 1838 – The Philippines became a leading center of postal service in Asia.
- 1898 – Established as a postal service
- 1922 – The Philippines joined the Universal Postal Union (UPU).
- 1926 – The Manila Central Post Office was built in its present neo-classic architecture.
- 1946 – The Manila Central Post Office was re-built.
- 1992 – The postal service became a government-owned and controlled corporation under its present name the Philippine Postal Corporation by Virtue of R.A.7354, the Postal Service Act of 1992.
- 2004 – The service was placed under the Commission on Information and Communication Technology per Executive Order 269 dated January 12, 2004.
- 2023 - Major fire in Manila Central Post Office

== See also ==
- Manila Central Post Office
- Philippine Postal Corporation
- Postal addresses
