= Postal addresses in the Philippines =

Mail destinations in the Southeast Asian country

Postal addresses in the Philippines are similar in format to those in many other parts of the world. They are especially used to locate areas in the Philippines.

== Address elements ==
Philippine addresses always contain the name of the sender, the building number and thoroughfare, the barangay where the building is located, the city or municipality where the barangay is located and, in most cases, the province where the city or municipality is located. In the case of Metro Manila, however, provinces are omitted and, in the case of Manila, include the district name instead of the barangay. ZIP codes are also part of the typical Philippine address.

=== Metro Manila address formats ===
For locations within Metro Manila, addresses are written as follows according to the recommended Philpost formats (address formats for Manila are on top while address formats for the rest of Metro Manila are on the bottom):

==== P.O. boxes ====
Mr. Juan dela Cruz
P.O. Box 1201, Manila Central Post Office
1050 Manila

Mr. Juan C. Masipag
P.O. Box 1121, Araneta Center Post Office
1135 Quezon City, Metro Manila

==== Direct delivery ====
Miss Teresita C. Metrillo
7114 Kundiman Street, Sampaloc
1008 Manila

Miss Auria M. Francisco
75 P. Domingo Street, Carmona, Makati City
1207 Metro Manila

=== Provincial address formats ===
Provincial address formats do not deviate from typical Metro Manila address formats, but they do vary slightly, as shown in the following Philpost-recommended address formats:

==== P.O. boxes ====
Ms. Perlita A. Sanchez
P.O. Box 1000, Gasan Post Office
4905 Gasan, Marinduque

==== Direct delivery ====
Addressee
House number and street, Purok/Subdivision
Barangay, City/Municipality
ZIP Code and Province

Mr. Samuel H. Magtanggol
95 Hermogenes Street, Sofia Subdivision
Del Pilar, San Fernando City
2000 Pampanga

== Postal codes' necessity ==
PhilPost recommends the use of postal codes in the country and correct addressing. However, most residents do not use, let alone know how to use ZIP codes, and thus the codes are usually omitted. According to PhilPost, the proper use of ZIP codes assists in letter sorting and reduces letter misrouting.

== See also ==
- Communications in the Philippines
- Philippine Postal Corporation
- ZIP codes in the Philippines
