= Philippine Postal Corporation =

Philippine postal service

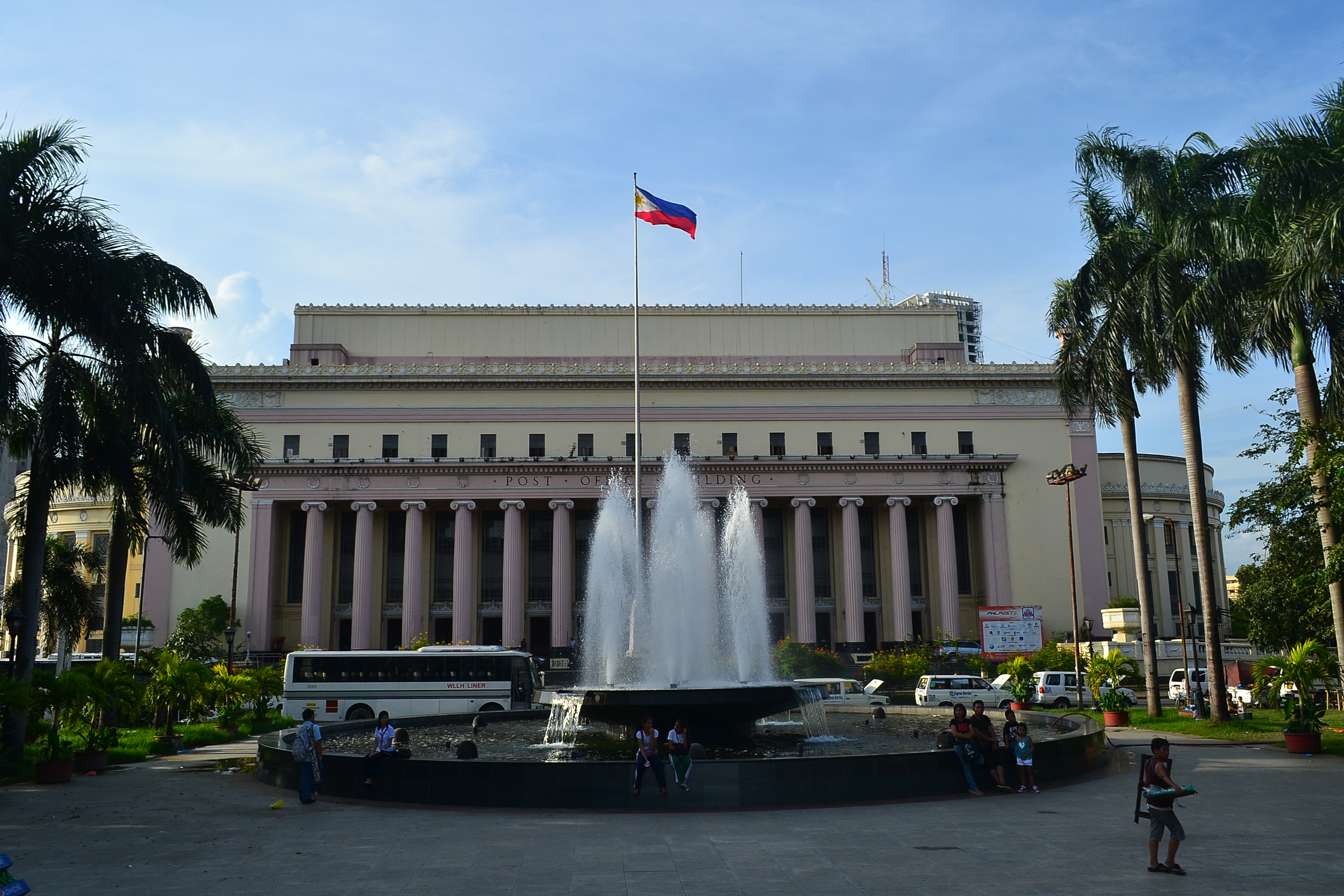
- Headquarters at Manila Central Post Office
- Native name: Korporasyong Pangkoreo ng Pilipinas
- Type: Government-owned and controlled corporation
- Industry: Postal Service
- Predecessor: Postal Service Office
- Founded: 1767; 259 years ago
- Headquarters: New Annex Building, Manila Central Post Office Compound, Liwasang Bonifacio, Manila, Philippines
- Area served: Philippines
- Key people: Chairman Stephen C. Cruz and Acting Postmaster General & CEO Maximo C. Sta.Maria III
- Products: Mail service Parcel post EMS Postal ID
- Number of employees: 8,000+ (as of 2014)
- Parent: Office of the President of the Philippines
- Website: phlpost.gov.ph

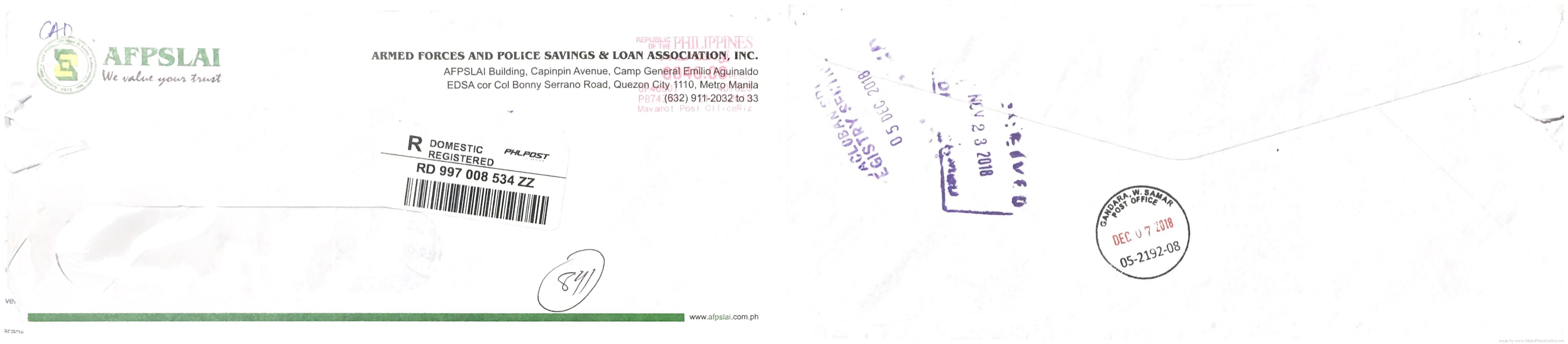
Mail envelope registered by PHLPost

The Philippine Postal Corporation (PHLPost; Filipino: Korporasyong Pangkoreo ng Pilipinas), also known as the Philippine Post Office, is a government-owned and controlled corporation under the Office of the President responsible for providing postal services in the Philippines. PHLPost employs more than 8,000 personnel and operates over 1,215 post offices nationwide. It is headquartered at the historic Manila Central Post Office, situated at Liwasang Bonifacio overlooking the Pasig River. It is currently headed by acting postmaster general Maximo C. Sta. Maria III. Its board of directors consists of seven members, including the postmaster general, who also serves as the corporation's chief executive officer.

Formerly an attached agency of the Department of Transportation and Communications (DOTC) and later the Commission on Information and Communications Technology (CICT), the Philippine Postal Corporation is now under the direct jurisdiction of the Office of the President of the Philippines.

== History ==
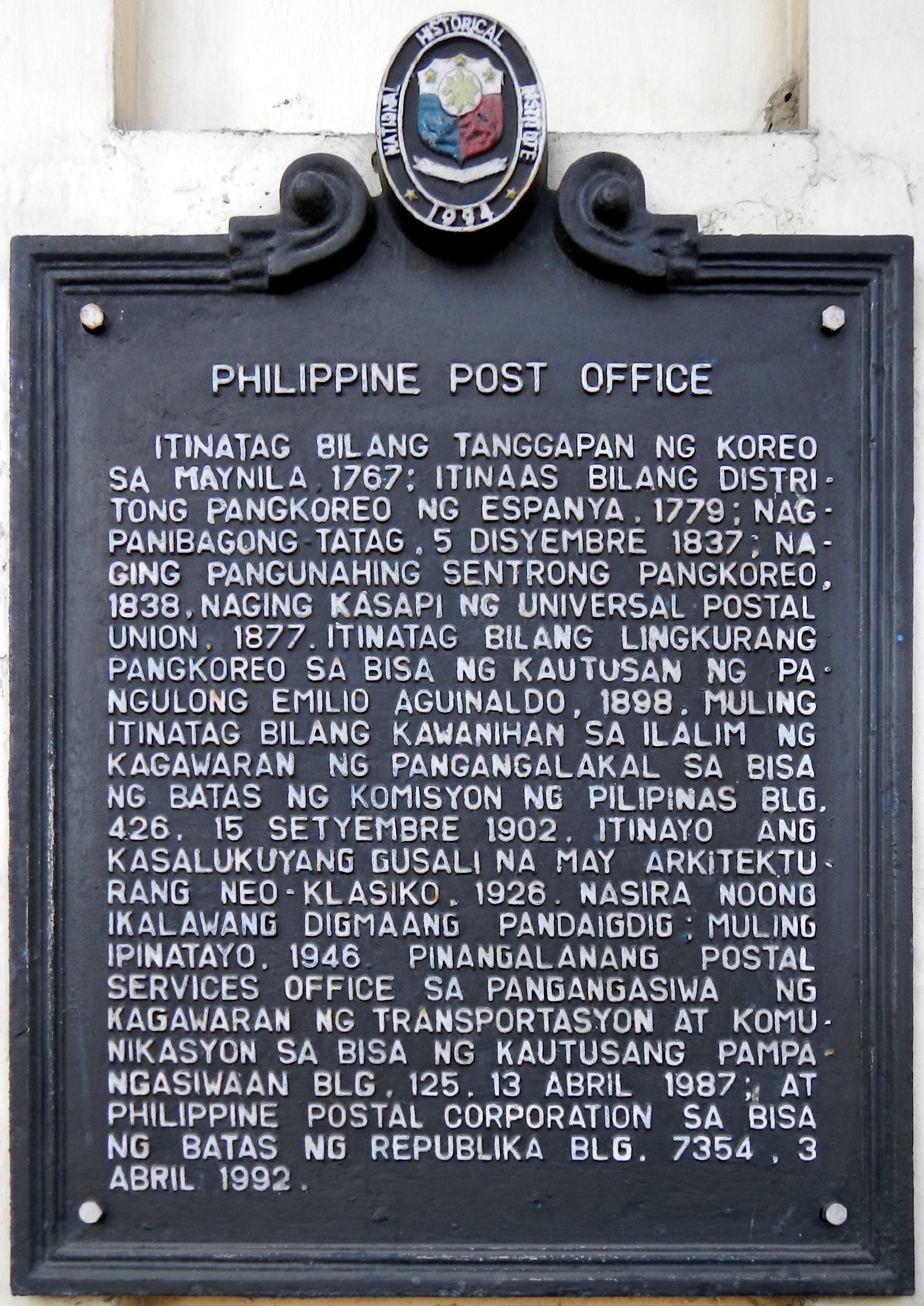
Historical marker installed at the Manila Central Post Office in 1994

The Philippine postal system has a history spanning over 250 years. In 1767, the first post office in the Philippines was established in the city of Manila, which was later organized under a new postal district of Spain. At first, the postal office served mainly to courier government and church documents. In 1779, the postal district encompassed Manila and the entire Philippine archipelago. The postal district was reestablished on December 5, 1837. A year later, Manila became known as a leading center of postal services within Asia. Spain joined the Universal Postal Union in 1875, which was announced in the Philippines two years later. By then post offices were set up not only in Manila but in many major towns and cities in the provinces. During that time, badageros or horseback-drawn letter carriers were dispatched to deliver mail from the "Tribunal" or town hall to "Casa Real" or the provincial capital.

It was during the Philippine Revolution that President Emilio Aguinaldo ordered the establishment of a Post Office to provide postal services to Filipinos. It was later organized as the Bureau of Posts under the Department of Trade on September 5, 1902, by virtue of Act No. 426, which was passed by the Philippine Commission. The Philippines eventually joined the Universal Postal Union, this time as a sovereign entity, on January 1, 1922.

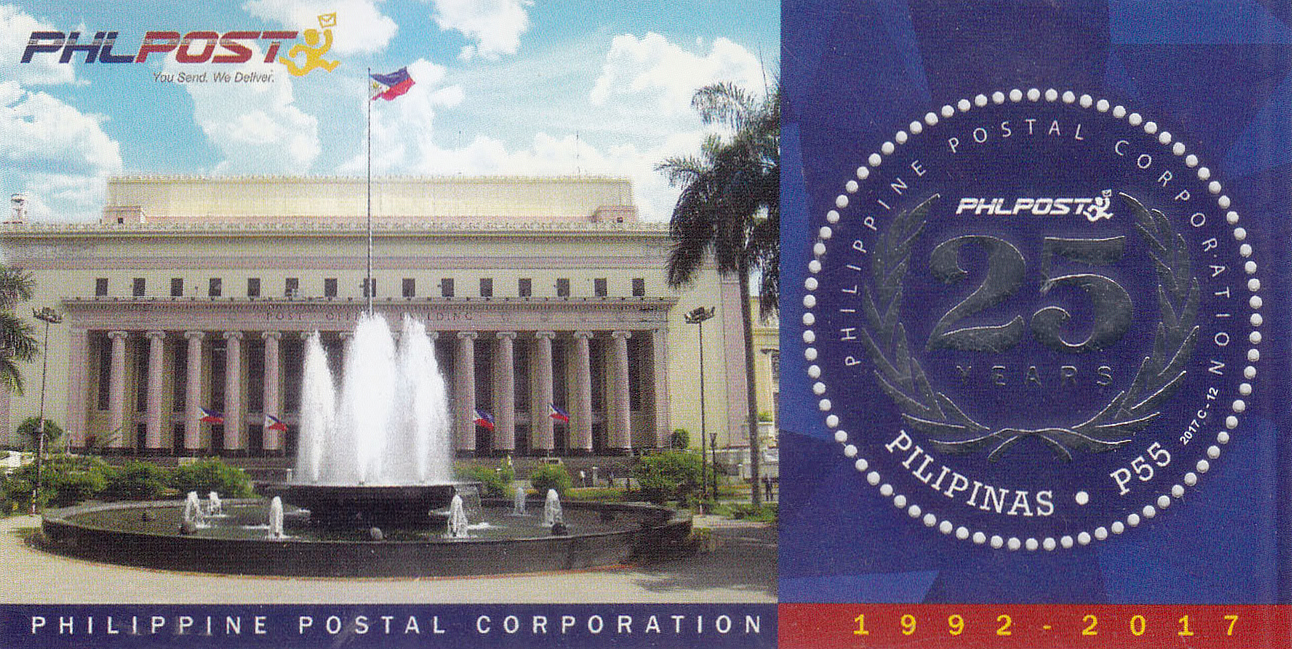
2017 stamp dedicated to the 25th anniversary of the corporation

The Manila Central Post Office building, the headquarters of the Bureau of Posts, was constructed in its present-day Neo-Classical style in 1926. It was designed by Filipino architect Juan M. Arellano and inaugurated in 1931, but was destroyed during World War II. After the war, the Central Post Office was rebuilt in 1946. It has since become a prominent landmark and tourist attraction in Manila.

On May 21, 2023, a massive fire hit the Manila Central Post Office late in the night and continued until the morning of May 23. The edifice was completely gutted, from the basement to the ground floor all the way up to the fifth floor; the structure was still there, but the ceiling had fallen down. Letters, parcels and the postal agency's entire stamp collection were likely destroyed. Fifteen people, mostly firefighters, were injured, while the amount of damage was estimated to be worth around ₱300 million.

In the aftermath of the fire, the Philippine Postal Corporation said it was transferring the central office's operations to the Foreign Surface Mail Distribution Center in Port Area, Manila, while the business mails service for private corporations was to be moved to the Central Mail Exchange Center in Pasay, near Ninoy Aquino International Airport.

In December 2024, PHLPost launched a Christmas stamp titled "Simbang Gabi sa Ilog Pasig," designed by Gelo Andres and Renacimiento Manila, to promote cultural and historical awareness of the Pasig River. Its title references the Simbang Gabi tradition. Measuring 234 × 40 mm, the stamp has been described as the "world's longest usable stamp". Its design features nine historical churches from Binondo to Antipolo located near the Pasig River.

In August 2025, PHLPost indefinitely suspended deliveries to the United States in response to tariffs imposed by the Trump administration. With PHLPost resuming delivery of mail and documents to the United States in September 2025.

== See also ==
- ZIP codes in the Philippines
- Postal addresses in the Philippines
- Postage stamps and postal history of the Philippines
