= Thomasian Welcome Walk =

Annual event

The Thomasian Welcome Walk
- Status: Active
- Frequency: Annual
- Venue: University of Santo Tomas
- Location: Manila
- Country: Philippines
- Inaugurated: 14 June 2002
- Most recent: 2026
- Attendance: 7,000-10,000

The Thomasian Welcome Walk (TWW) is an annual event of the University of Santo Tomas in Manila, Philippines. Freshmen walk through the Arch of the Centuries, a monument that served as the original doorway to the first campus of the university in Intramuros.

== Event ==
The tradition of passing through the Arch of the Centuries as a welcome to the freshmen community began in 2002. It was first called as "The Rites of Passage". The activities in welcoming the new students were made to complement the Baccalaureate Mass and send-off rites to the graduates at end of the school year.

The parade is followed by a mass that is usually concelebrated by the university rector.

It is a popular superstition that undergraduates should not pass through the Arch the opposite way before the send-off rites because it could result in an untimely exit from the university.

Since 2012, the Walk has been divided into two batches: morning and afternoon. Students from the morning batch walk through the Arch after their orientation, folllowed by students from the afternoon batch, who pass through the Arch first before proceeding to the Quadricentennial Pavilion for their orientation.

Second-year and third-year students were given a special Homecoming Walk in 2022, as the university returned to onsite classes after the COVID-19 pandemic.

=== Parade route ===
The parade begins from assembly areas of the different college buildings then converges on Intramuros Drive. The students enter the España Boulevard side of the arch then continues to the Rizal Lane (Lover's Lane) toward the UST Main Building.

In the early years, the parade passed through the Benavides Plaza and ended in front of the Main Building where a mass and welcoming events were held. The venues changed later on to accommodate the increased freshmen population. In years not affected by the weather, programs are held at the UST Grandstand. The route turns left before it reaches the Benavides Plaza and goes straight to the UST Grandstand. During inclement weather, the route turns right before it reaches the Benavides Plaza and ends at the UST Quadricentennial Pavilion.

=== List of walks ===
Date	Freshmen population	Venue of mass and programs	Ref.
June 14, 2002		In front of UST Main Building (now Plaza Mayor)	
June 20, 2003	~5,000	In front of UST Main Building (now Plaza Mayor)	
July 16, 2004			
June 2005	Not held. Replaced by Walking Tour and Freshmen Orientation Program		
July 21, 2006	7,302	Plaza Benavides	
July 17, 2007	12,000	UST Grandstand	
June 29, 2008		UST Grandstand and Plaza Mayor	
July 24, 2009	10,500	UST Grandstand	
June 23, 2010		UST Grandstand	
August 5, 2011	10,000+		
September 24, 2012		Quadricentennial Pavilion (in 2 batches)	
June 7, 2013	11,721	UST Grandstand	
July 11, 2014	13,049	Quadricentennial Pavilion (in 2 batches)	
August 5, 2015	12,815	UST Grandstand	
August 5, 2016	7,915	Quadricentennial Pavilion	
August 4, 2017	6,000+ (2,000+ first-year college students, 4,000+ Grade 11 senior high school students, among others)	Quadricentennial Pavilion	
August 6, 2018	16,827 (12,866 first-year college, 3,433 grade 11 senior high school, among others)	Quadricentennial Pavilion	
August 6-7, 2019	14,976 (9,909 college freshmen, 1,053 graduate school freshmen, 3,410 Grade 11, among others)	Quadricentennial Pavilion (in 3 batches)	
August 29-30, 2020, September 5-6, 2020	12,000+	Online streaming on UST Tiger TV Facebook page	
August 9, 2022, August 23, 2022 (2nd and 3rd year students)	8,523 college and graduate school freshmen 2,479 Grade 11 students	Quadricentennial Pavilion	
August 4, 2023 (Basic Education); August 5, 2023 (Higher Education)	9,450 college and graduate school freshmen 2,920 Grade 11 students	Quadricentennial Pavilion	
August 5, 2024 (Higher Education, Manila); August 7, 2024 (Basic Education); August 29, 2024 (GenSan)	13,500 high school students, college and graduate school freshmen (Manila); 126 college freshmen (GenSan)	Quadricentennial Pavilion (Manila); In front of UST GenSan Main Building (GenSan)	
August 6, 2025 (Higher Education, Manila); August 7, 2025 (Basic Education); August 20, 2025 (GenSan)	10,381 college and graduate school freshmen (Manila); 2,920 Grade 11 students 213 college freshmen (GenSan)	Quadricentennial Pavilion; In front of UST GenSan Main Building (UST GenSan)	
August 13, 2026 (Higher Education, Manila); August 20, 2025 (GenSan); September 7, 2026 (Basic Education)	10,561 college and graduate school freshmen (Manila); 221 college freshmen (GenSan); 3,000+ High school students	Quadricentennial Pavilion; In front of UST GenSan Main Building (UST GenSan)	

== Virtual walk ==
In 2020, because of the COVID-19 pandemic, the event was replaced by a virtual tour of the campus with Minecraft. The virtual tour had a dedicated Minecraft server that was constructed by over 80 UST students.

The project won the “Project of the Year” award in the first-ever AcadArena Awards.

== UAAP opening ceremony ==
In 2016, the university hosted the UAAP Season 79 opening ceremonies in the campus. Student-athletes from all sporting disciplines of all the member schools passed through the arch. The parade moved straight to Rizal Lane, past the statue of Miguel de Benavides, and through to the Plaza Mayor. This was promptly followed by a 10-minute fireworks display from atop the Main Building.

It was done again when the university hosted the UAAP Season 88 opening ceremonies in 2025, this time with an accompanying drone show. Athletes turned left from the Plaza Mayor towards the University of Santo Tomas Field, where the opening ceremonies took place.

== Postponements ==
In 2009, the Walk was postponed for more than a month because of the cases of Influenza A(H1N1) virus in the campus. In 2012, like the previous years, the Walk was postponed several times because of bad weather. Originally scheduled on June 28, it was held on September 24 at the UST Quadricentennial Pavilion. The Walk, for the first time, was divided into two batches as the venue could not accommodate all freshmen students. Since then, more postponements of the Welcome Walk were observed, most recently in 2026.
