= Arch of the Centuries =

Arch in Manila

- Arko ng mga Siglo
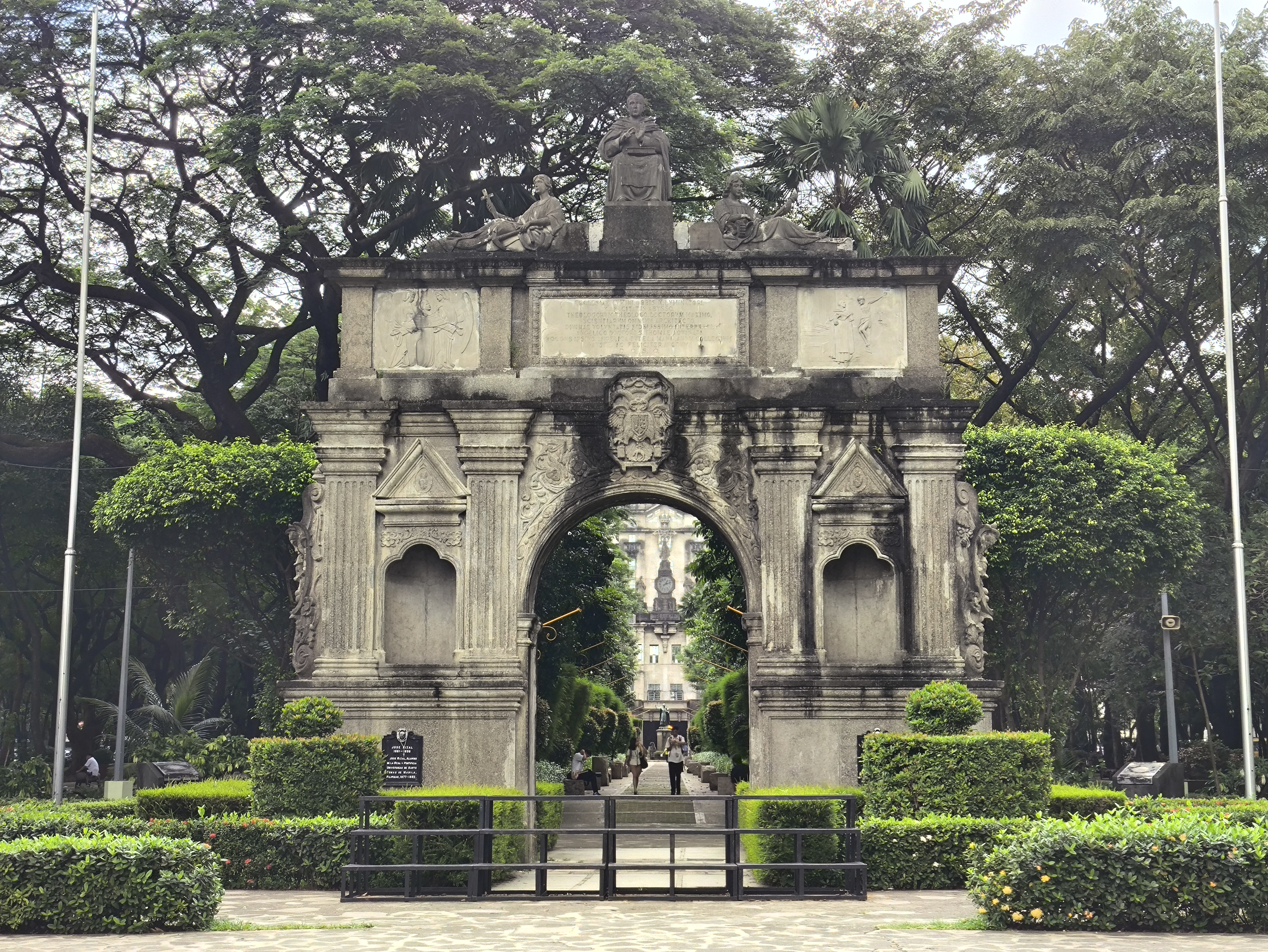
- The arch in 2025 as seen from España Boulevard
- Former names: Puerta del Colegio

General information
- Type: Arch
- Architectural style: Baroque
- Location: UST Plaza Intramuros, Manila, Philippines
- Coordinates: 14°36′30″N 120°59′27″E
- Construction started: c. 1680
- Relocated: 1954

Design and construction
- Main contractor: C.F. Pablo and Son (1953)

National Cultural Treasures
- Designated: 25 January 2010
- Reference no.: 1–2010

The Arch of the Centuries (Filipino: Arko ng mga Siglo) is a arched gate at the Plaza Intramuros of the University of Santo Tomas in Manila, Philippines. Half of the current structure, the side facing the UST Main Building is the ruins of the 17th-century arch door of the first UST campus in Intramuros, while the side that faces España Boulevard is a replica inaugurated in 1954.

It was declared as a National Cultural Treasure by the National Museum on 25 January 2010.

One of the cultural icons of the University of Santo Tomas, it is often the site of important campus events. The Thomasian Welcome Walk is UST's tradition of welcoming the freshmen by passing through the arch. The passing through happens once more after the baccalaureate mass when the graduating class exits through the arch, signifying the completion of their student life in the university.

== History ==
The north side of the present-day Arch of the Centuries served as the arch door portal to the university when it was still in the walled city of Intramuros. The university's oldest floor plan, created by Juan Peguero, the procurator of the Dominican Province of the Philippines from 1675 to 1677 and from 1680 to 1684, designates the arch door as the Puerta del Colegio. The arch door faced the first Benavides Statue, which was located at Calle Postigo and Calle de Santo Tomas.

The Battle of Manila in 1945 left the 17th-century campus completely destroyed. In 1953, UST rector Jesus Castañon ordered that the arch door, one of the few structures that survived, be transferred to the Sampaloc campus. Carmelo Flavier Pablo of C.F. Pablo and Son, a precast contractor, was hired to dismantle the ruins piece by piece and transport them to the present campus. The structure took the contractor a year to complete. It was finished and inaugurated in 1954 and became formally known as the Arch of the Centuries.

On 25 January 2010, it was declared a National Cultural Treasure, along with the UST Main Building, the UST Central Seminary Building, and the university field by the National Museum of the Philippines.

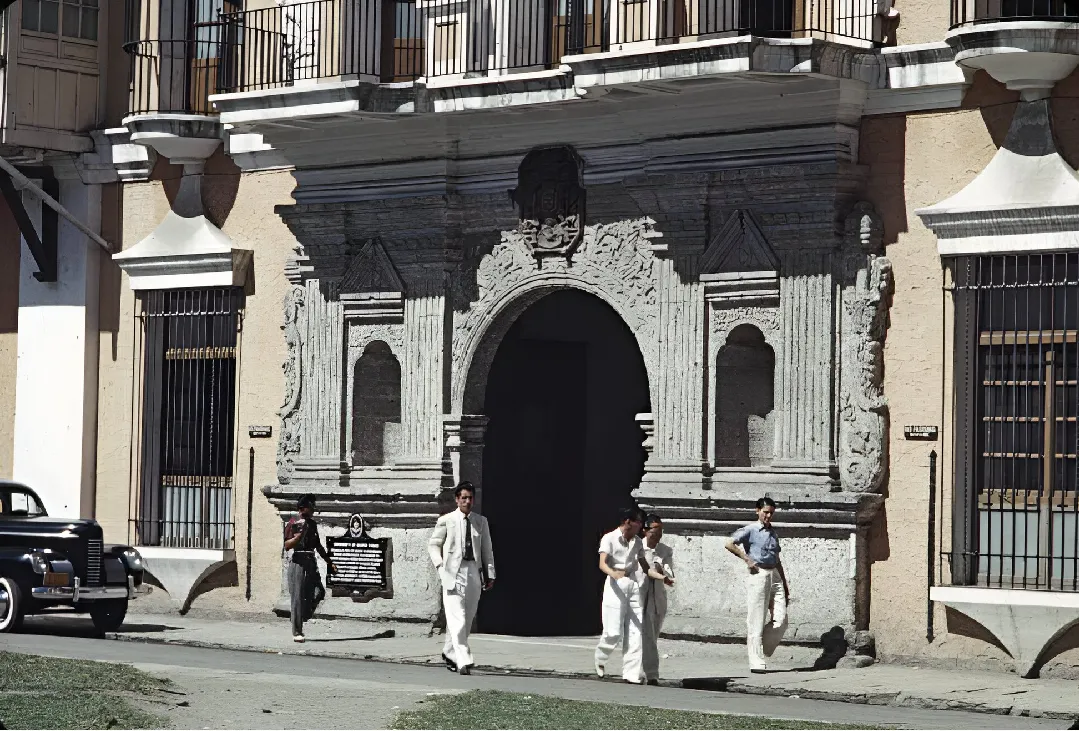
The Puerta del Colegio as seen in the Intramuros campus.

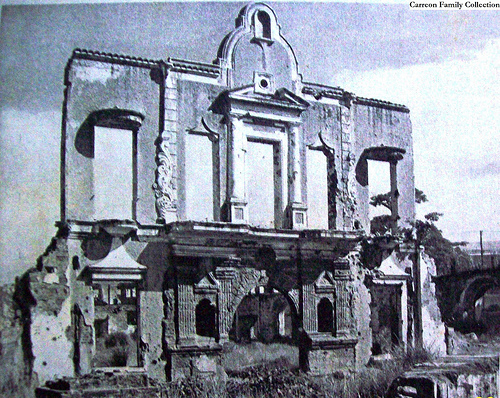
The campus in ruins after the Battle of Manila.

== Design ==
=== Attic ===
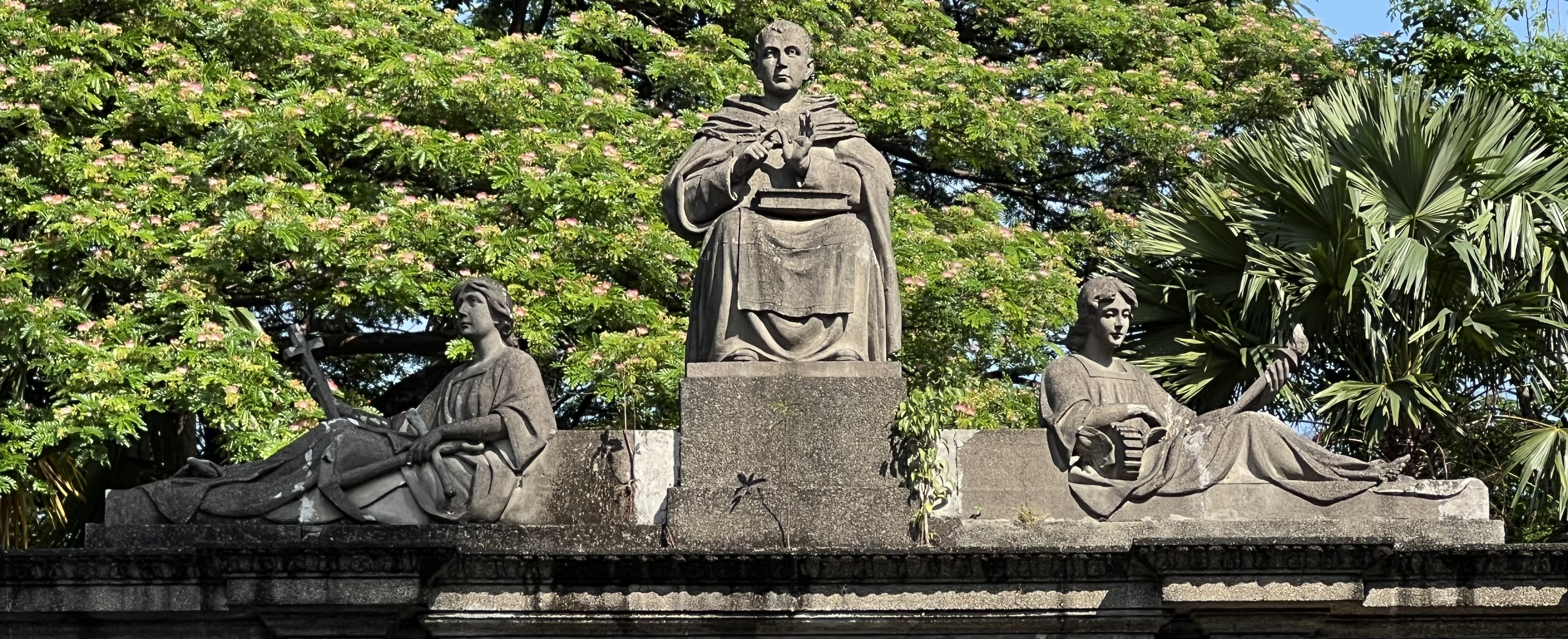
The south attic

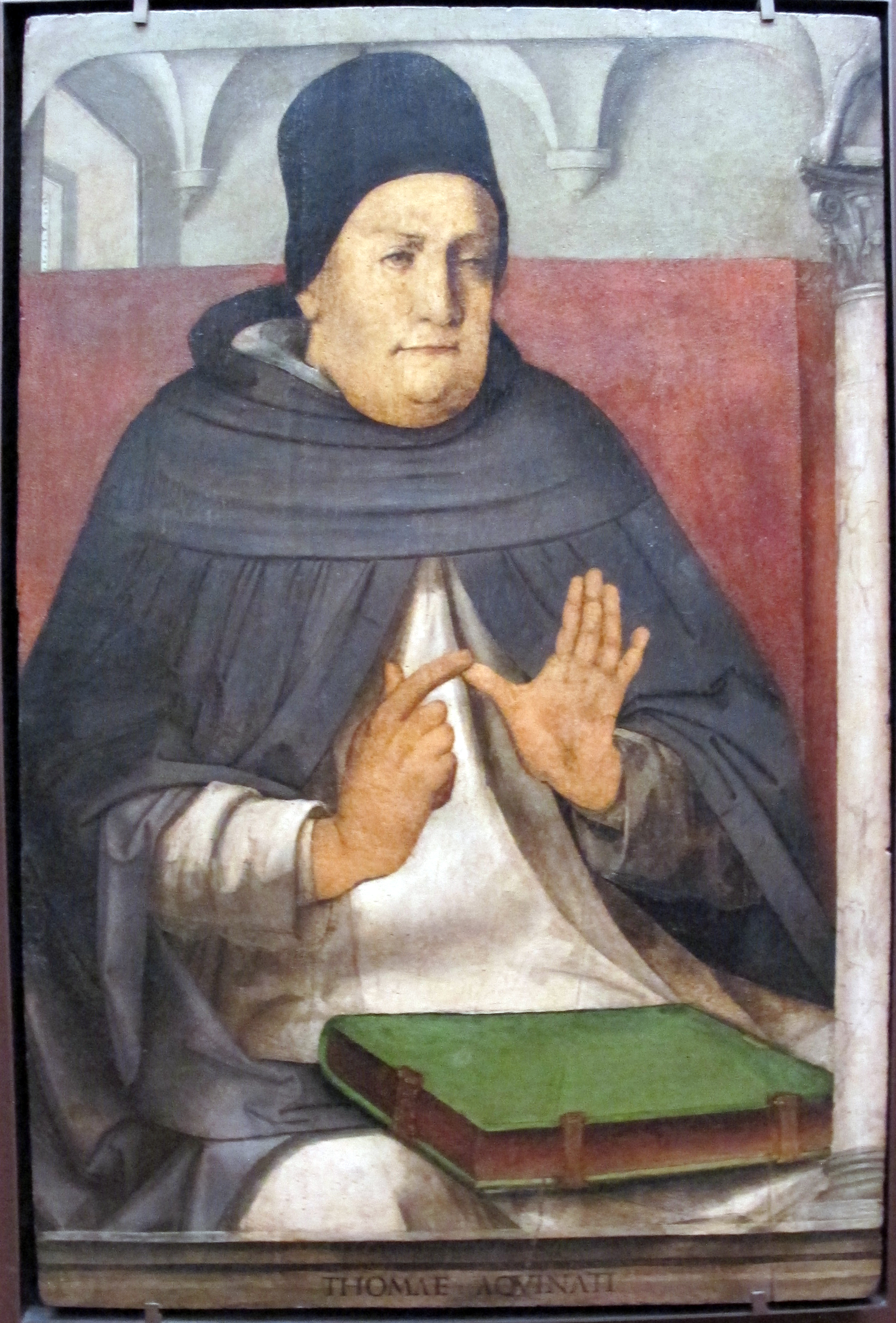
Santo Tomás de Aquino, Justus van Gent and Pedro Berruguete, c. 1473-1476.

The statue of Thomas Aquinas above the attic story was inaugurated on 21 December 1955. The saint is portrayed as a young and energetic man seated on a chair. This depiction of Thomas Aquinas is similar to the painting by Justus van Gent and Pedro Berruguete.

Two female figures flank the Thomas Aquinas statue. The female facing west holds a cross in her right hand and an admiralty pattern anchor in her left hand. The female facing east holds a torch in her left hand, while her right arm rests on a winged wheel. These two figures correspond to the two fountains on both sides of the arch, the Fountain of Divine Wisdom and the Fountain of Human Wisdom (Fountain of Knowledge). The replica of the façade, the statues, and the bas-relief panels were also done by Carmelo Flavier Pablo.

Directly above the arch is the main inscription, which is different on both sides. Flanking the main inscriptions are four bas-relief panels depicting the life of Thomas Aquinas.

- Two angels giving him the girdle of chastity (Southwest panel).
- Thomas Aquinas speaking to an icon of the crucified Christ (Southeast panel).
- Thomas Aquinas and the Eucharist (Northeast panel).
- Thomas Aquinas taught by Saints Peter and Paul (Northwest panel).
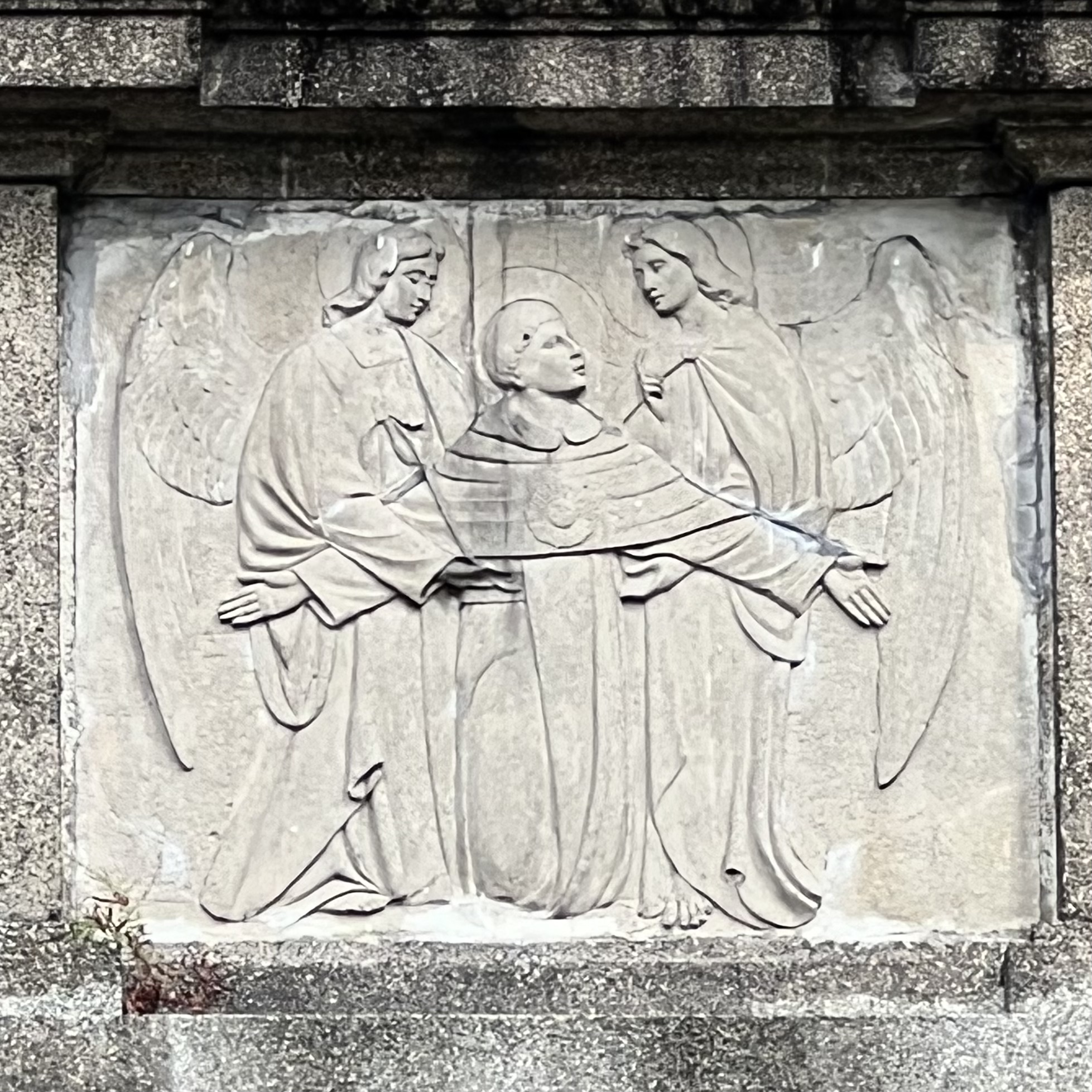
Southwest panel

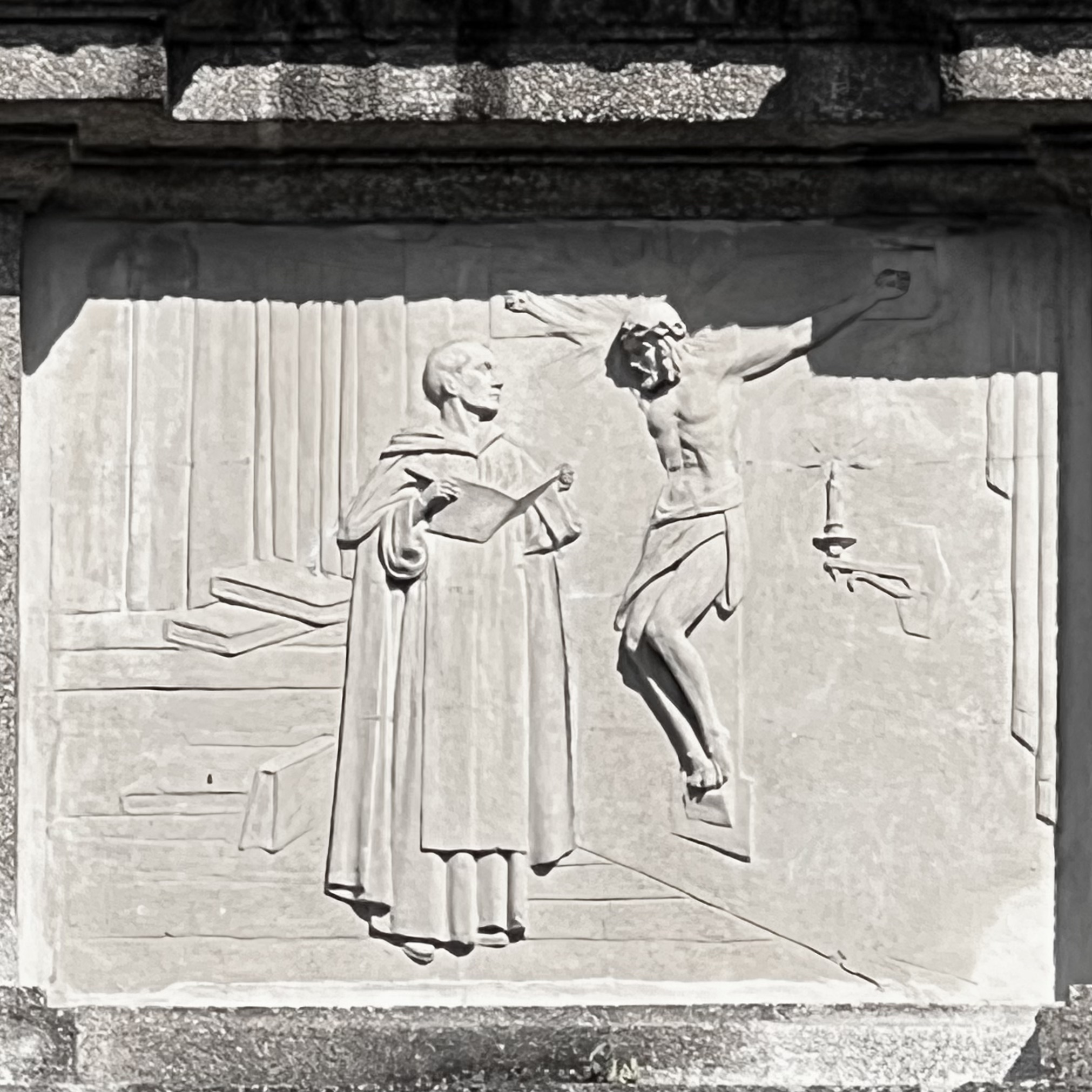
Southeast panel

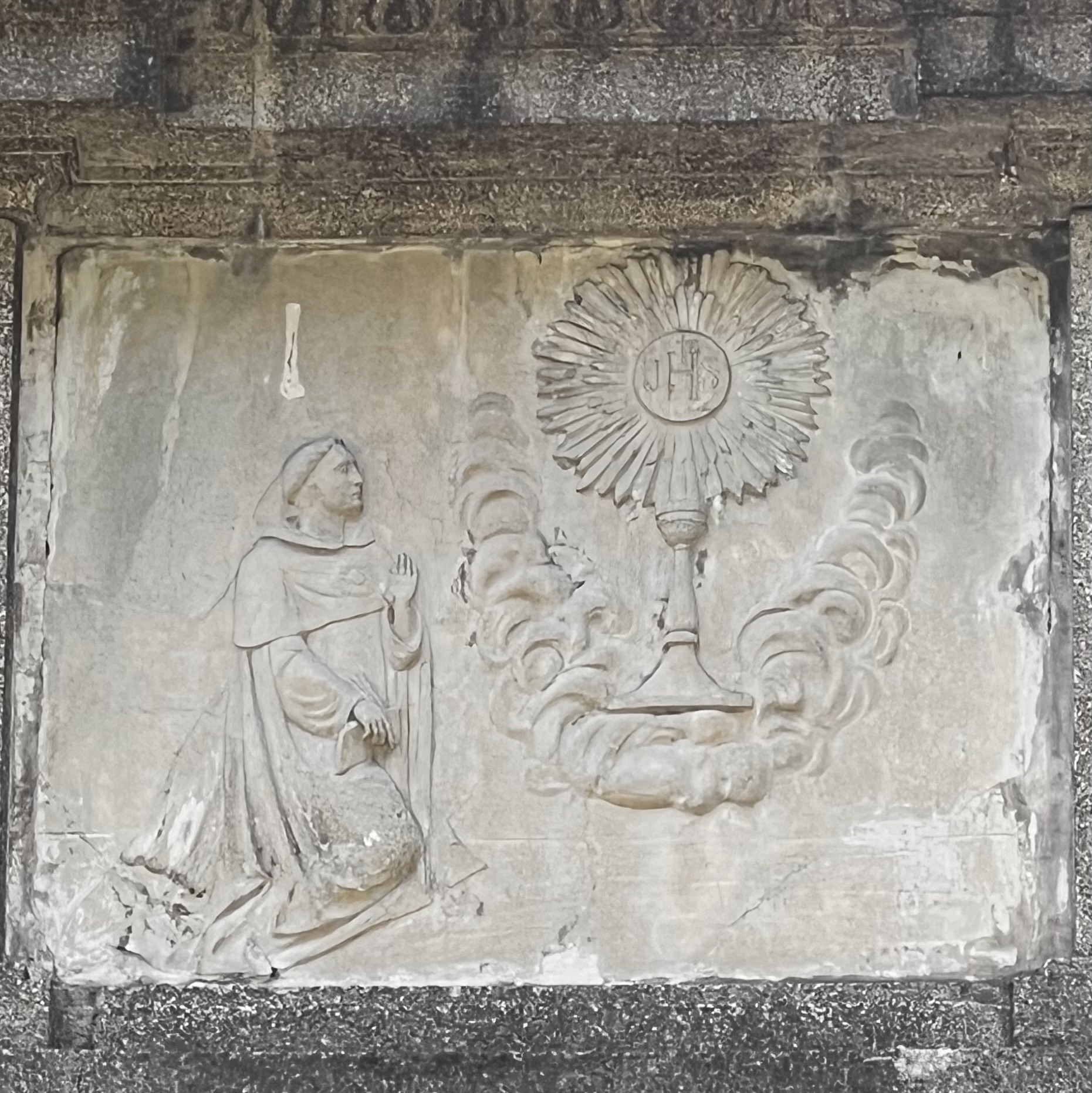
Northeast panel

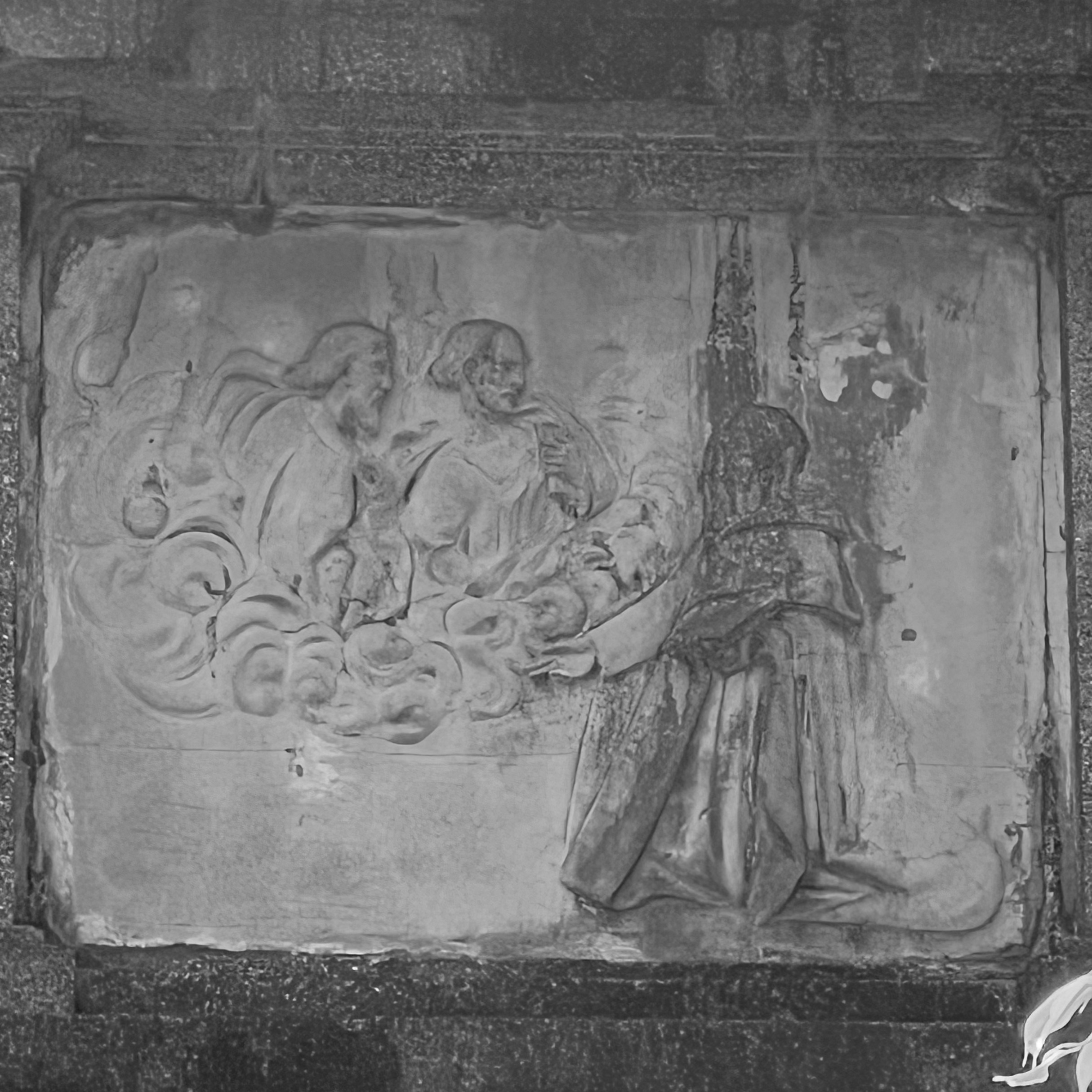
Northwest panel

Below the main inscription is a coat of arms that features a double-headed eagle. The coat of arms is similar to the one used by Charles I, the King of Spain when the Philippines was discovered.

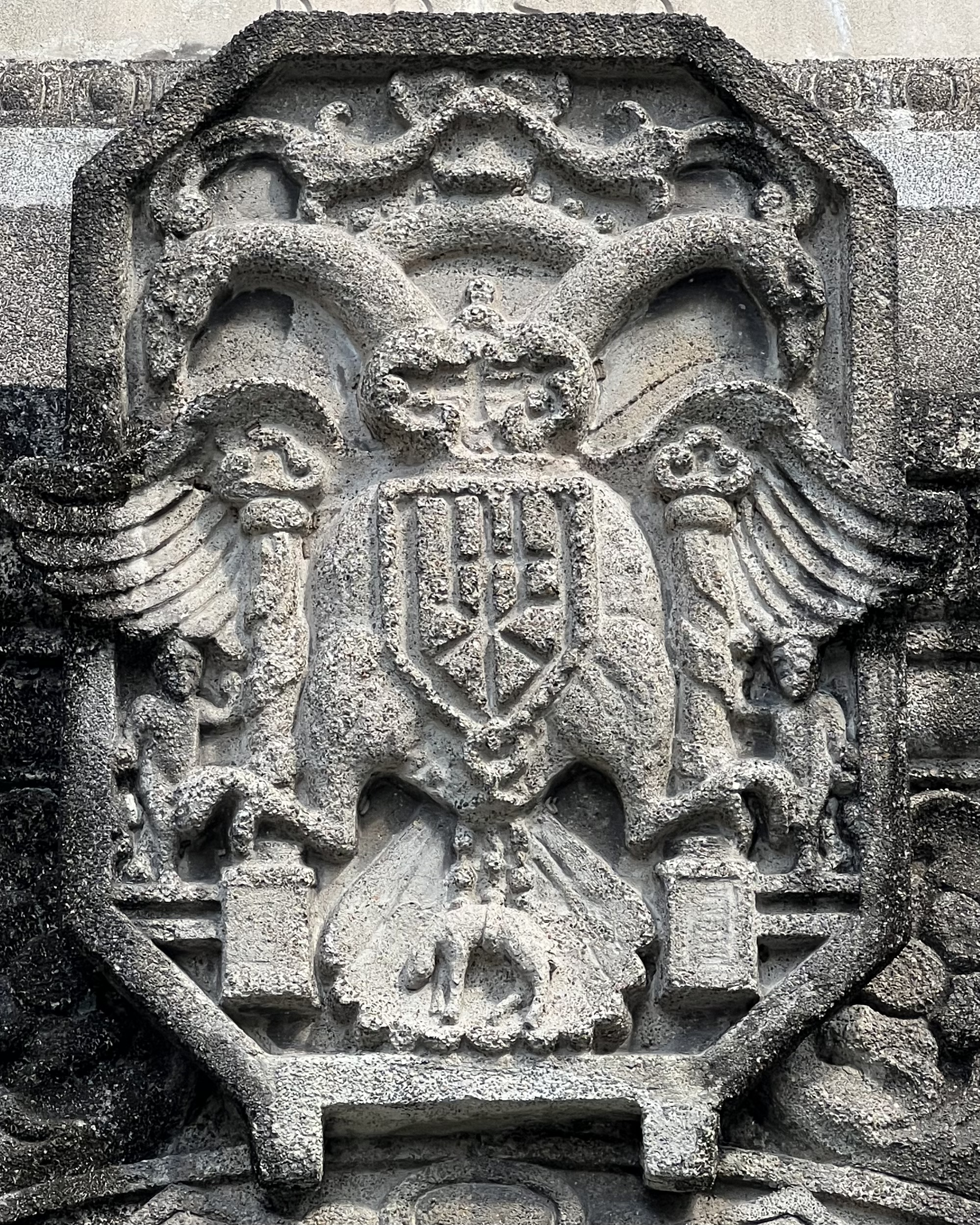
Coat of arms in front

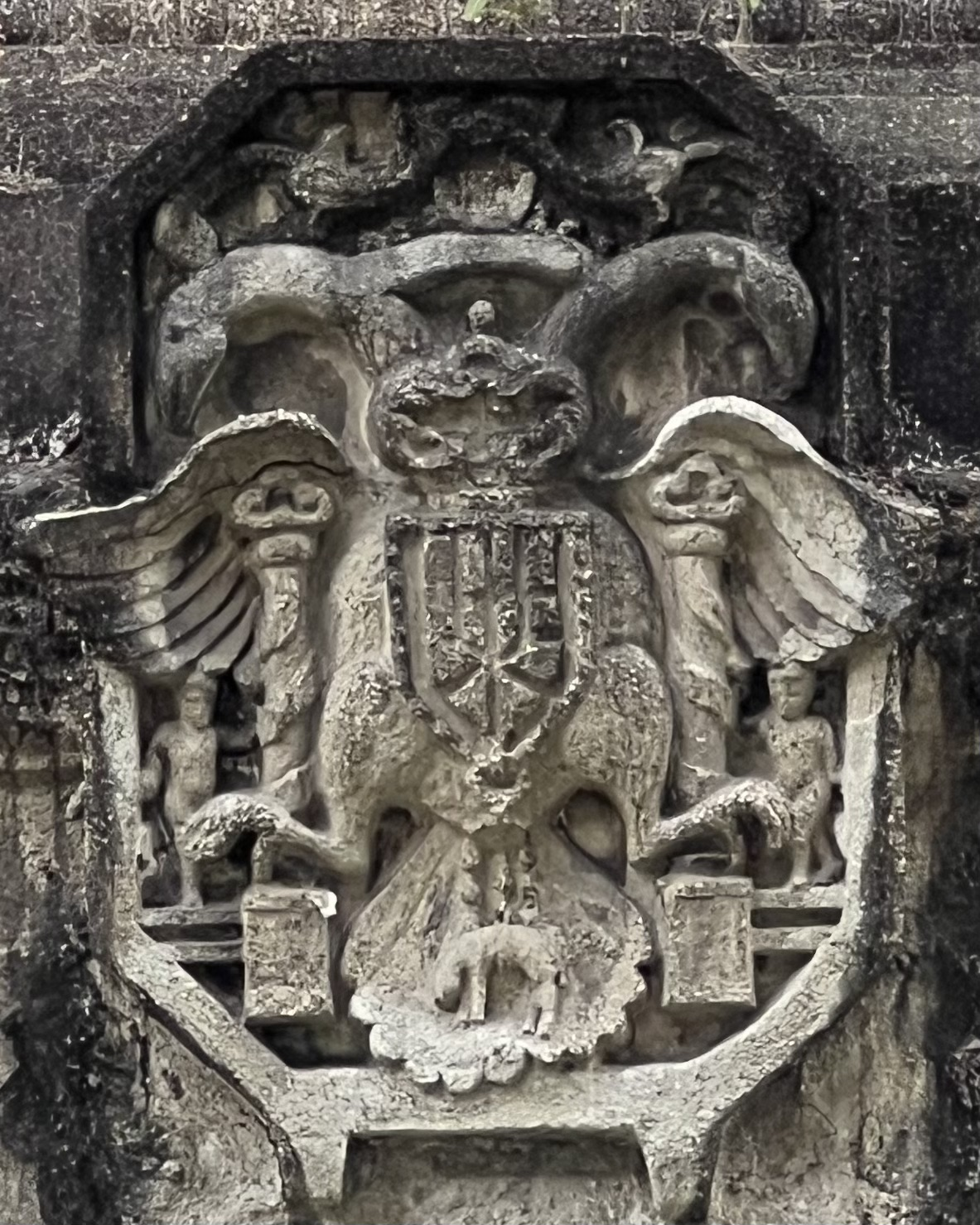
Coat of arms in the back

Coat of Arms of King Charles I of Spain.

=== Main section ===
The main façade consists of two columns on each side of the archway. The columns are of Doric order. The spandrels of the archway consists of Baroque reliefs.

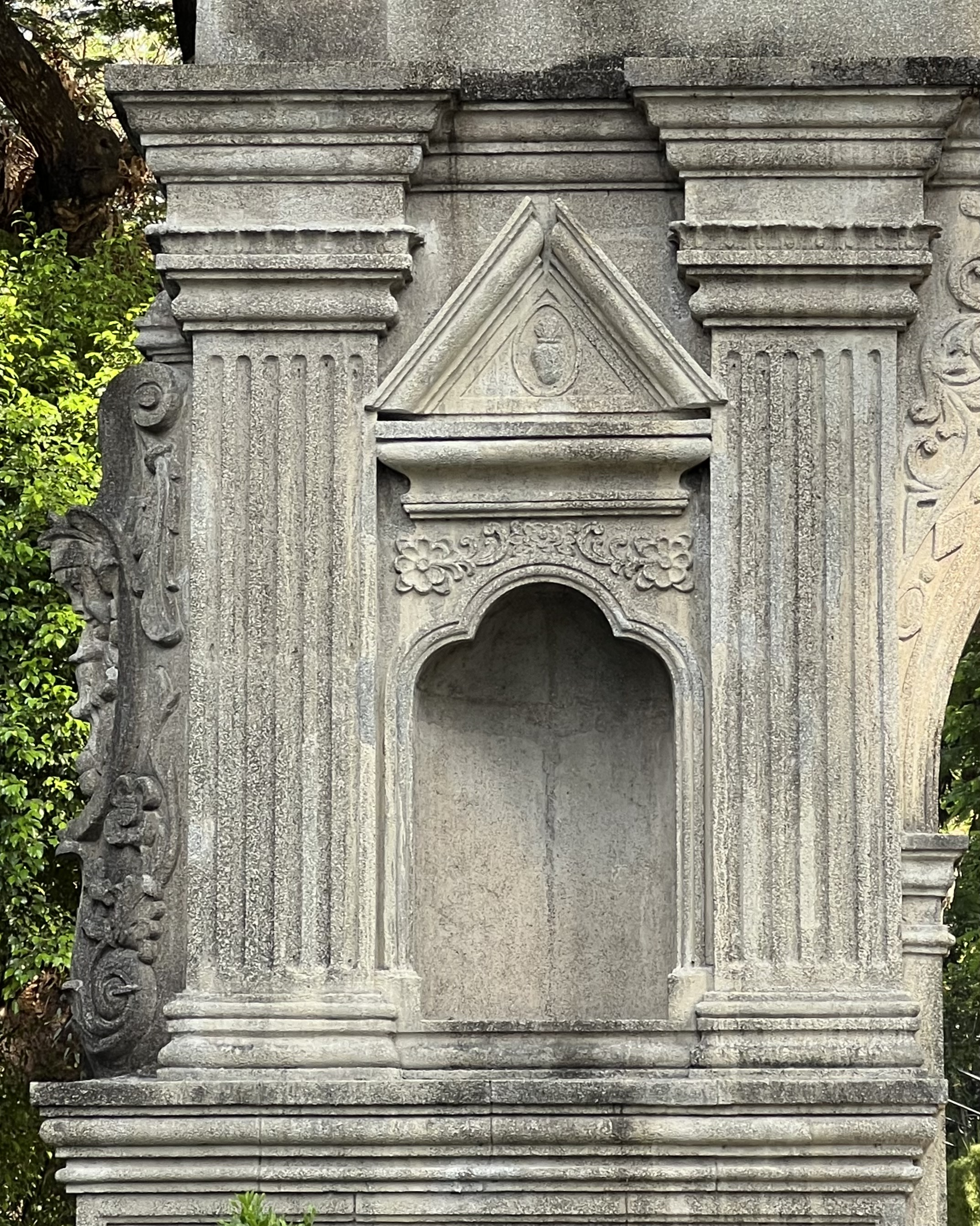
Columns on the south (front) side

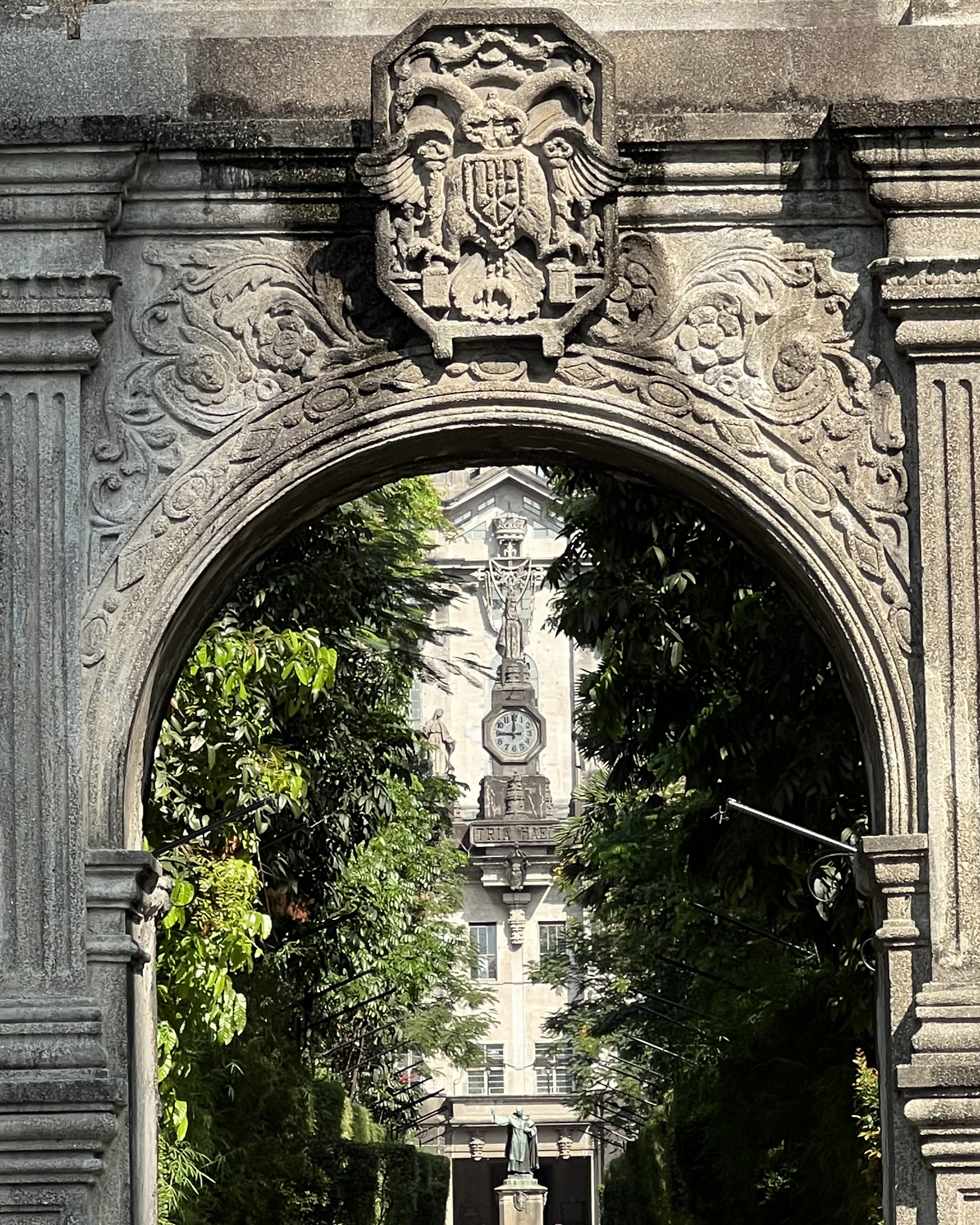
The main arch way

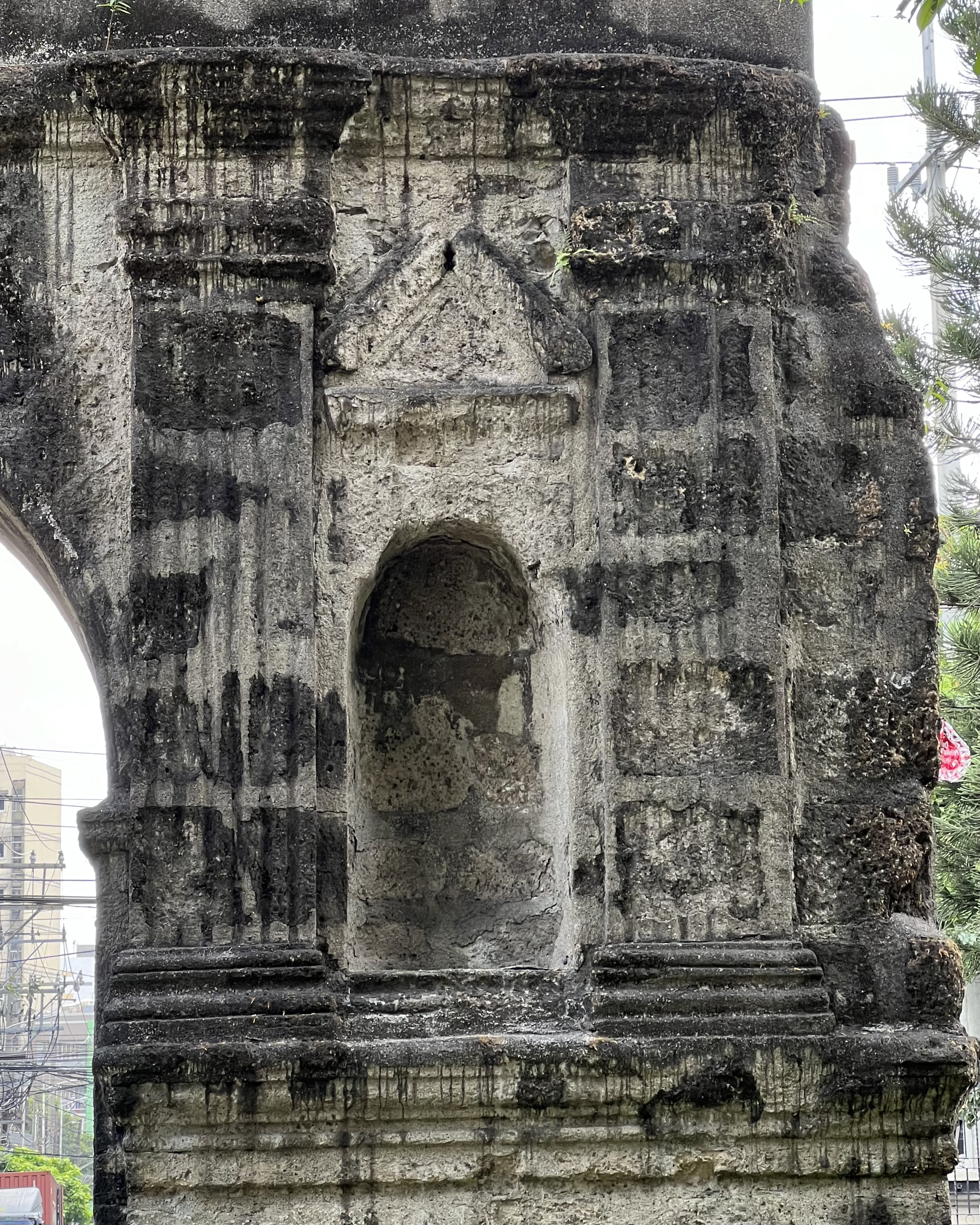
Columns on the north (back) side

== Inscriptions ==
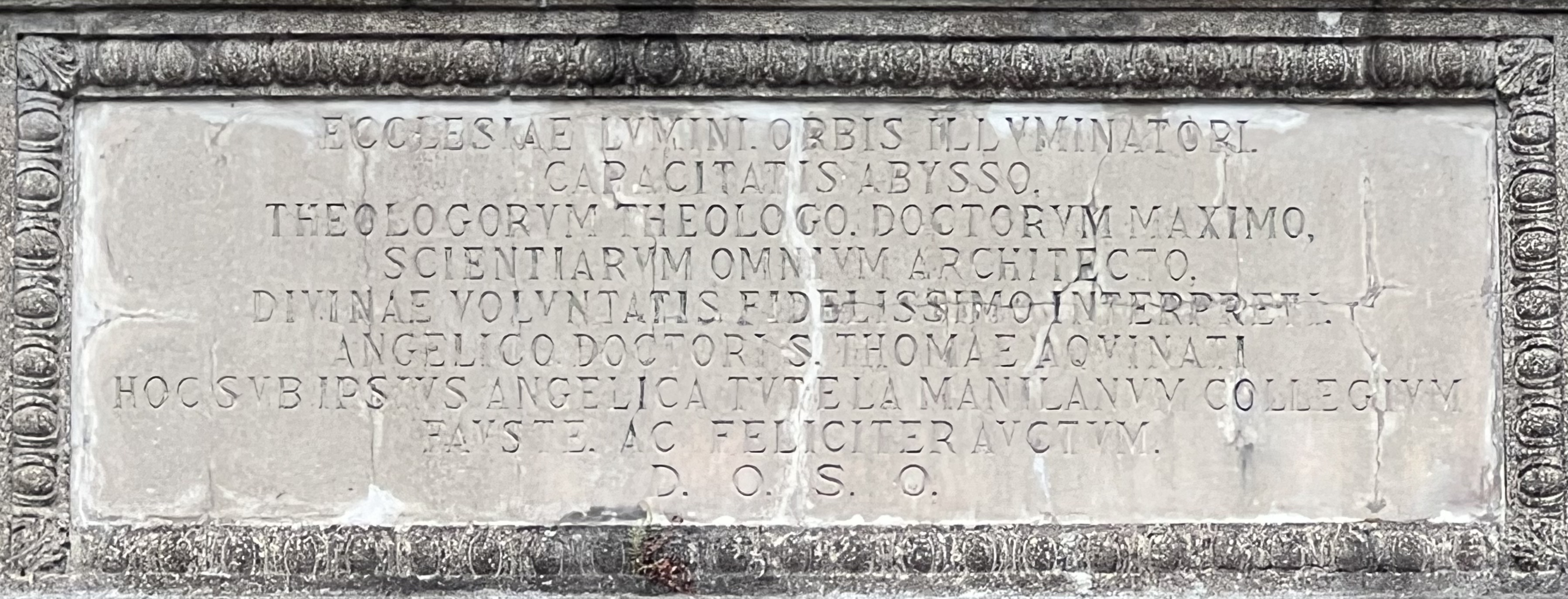
South inscription

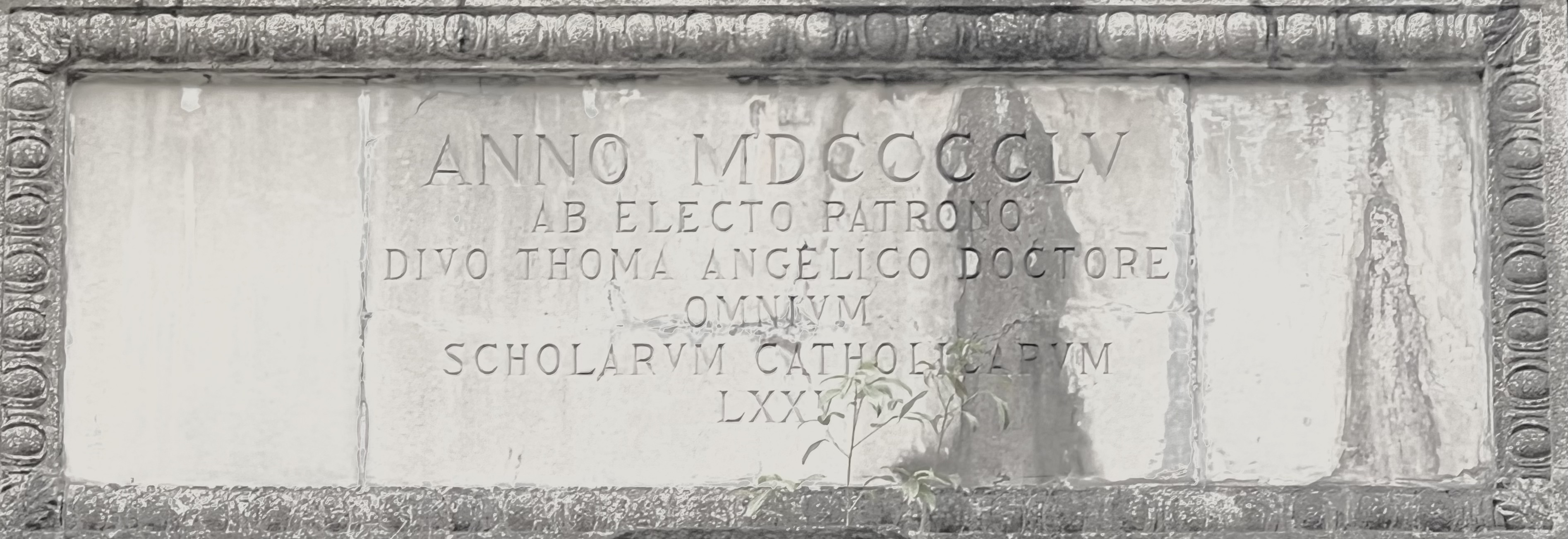
North inscription

The main inscription on the south (front) attic reads:

Ecclesiae Lvmini Orbis Illvminatori
Capacitatis Abysso
Theologorvm Theologo, Doctorum Maximo
Scientiarvm Omnivm Architecto
Divinae Volvntatis Fidelissimo Interpreti
Angelico Doctoris S. Thomae Aqvinati
Hoc Svb Ipsvs Angelica Tutela Manilanvm Collegivm
Favste Ac Feliciter Avctvm
D.O.S.O.

To the light of the church, illuminator of the world
Abyss of learning
Theologian of theologians, greatest of doctors
Architect of all sciences
Most faithful interpreter of the will of God
Angelic doctor Saint Thomas Aquinas
This college in Manila is auspiciously and felicitously expanded
under his angelic tutelage.

The main inscription at the north (back) attic reads:

Anno MDCCCCLV
Ab Electo Patrono
Divo Thoma Angelico Doctore
Ominum
Scholarvm Catholicarvm
LXXV

Year 1955
75 years since the Saint Thomas angelic doctor was elected patron of all catholic Schools

On the left pier facing España Boulevard is a commemorative plaque honoring José Rizal, and on the right pier is a plaque honoring Philippine President Manuel L. Quezon.

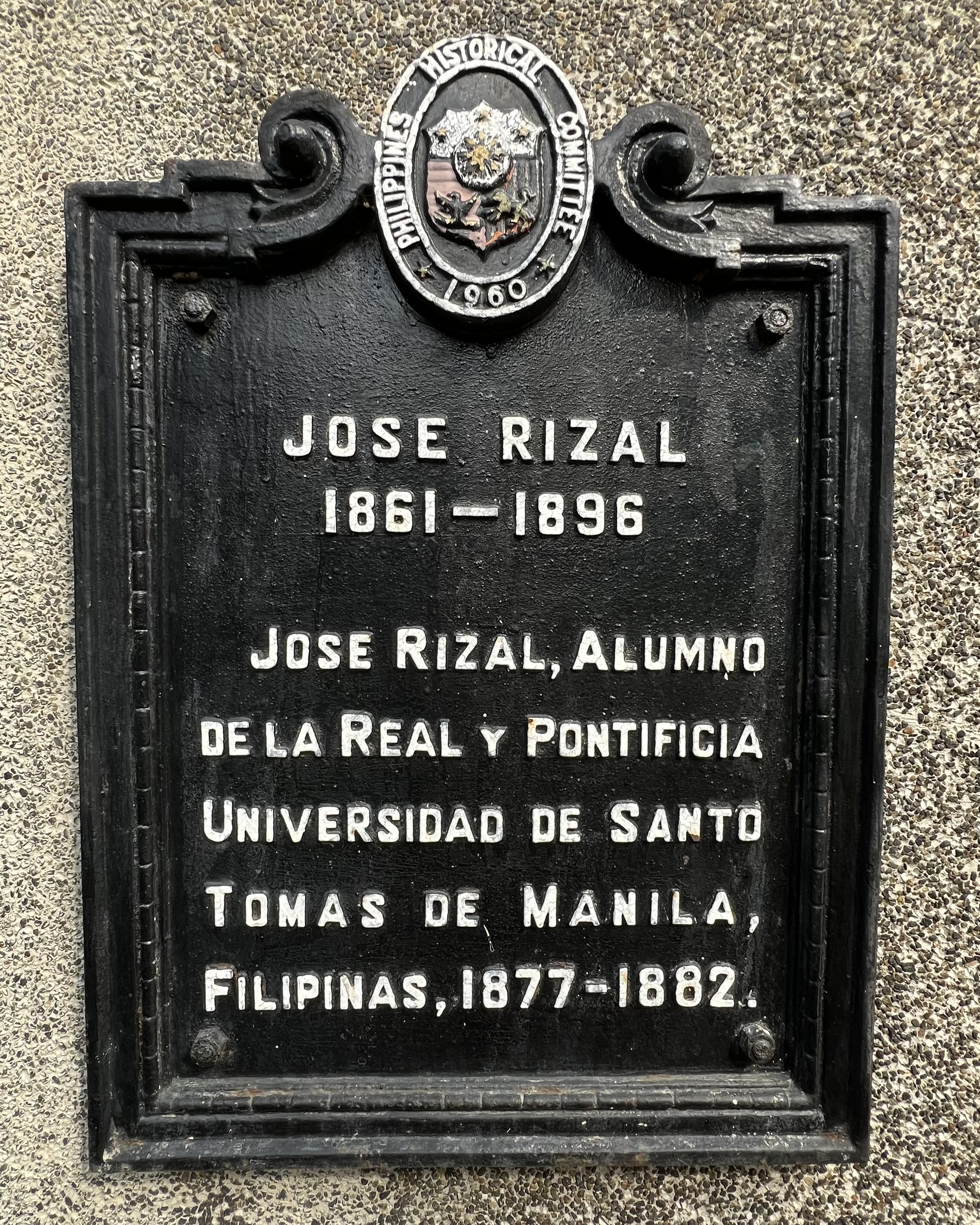

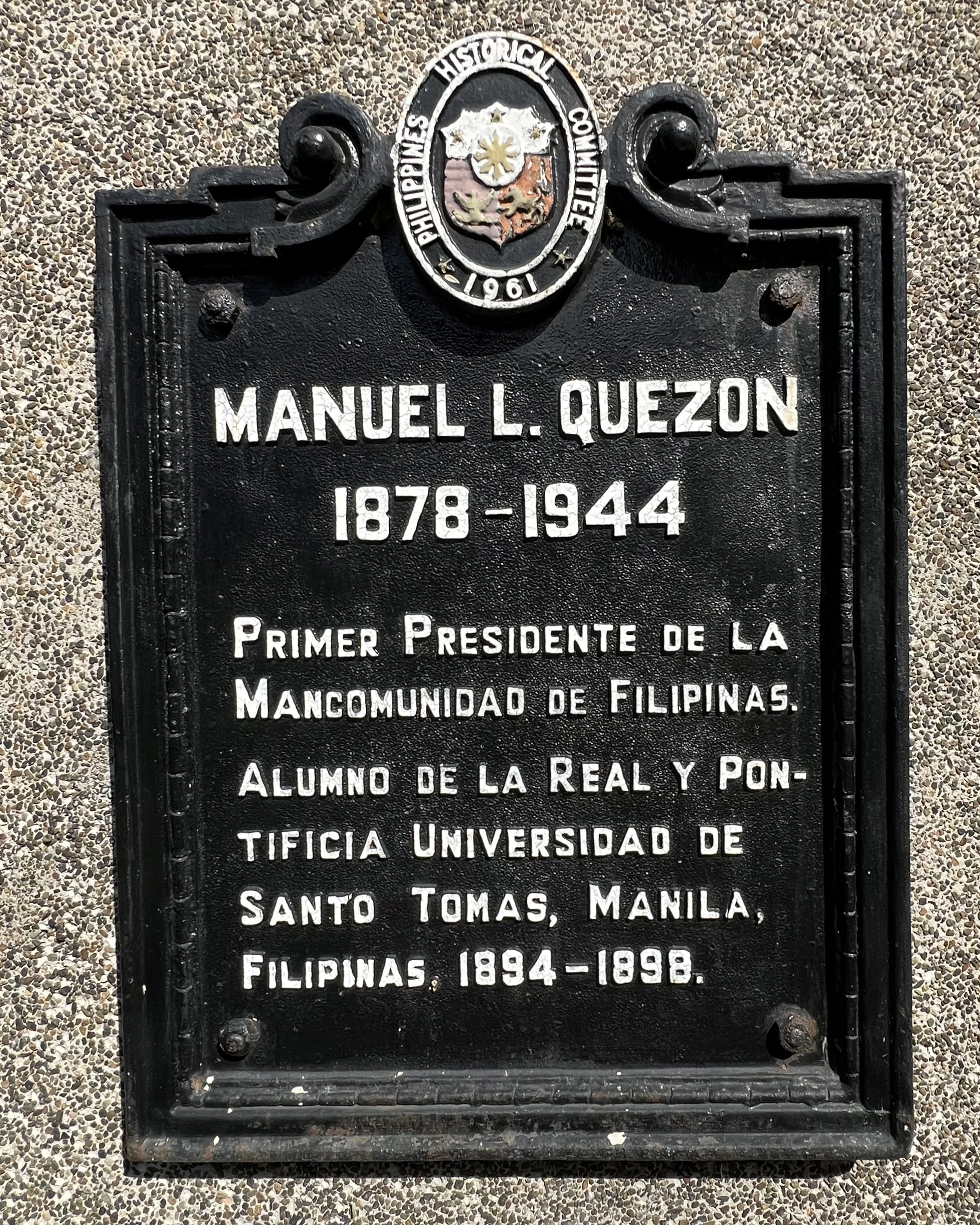

The bronze marker on the side of the left pier tells the history of the arch. The words underneath it read, Gateway to the history of the finest breed of Filipinos, a reference to the UST alumni.

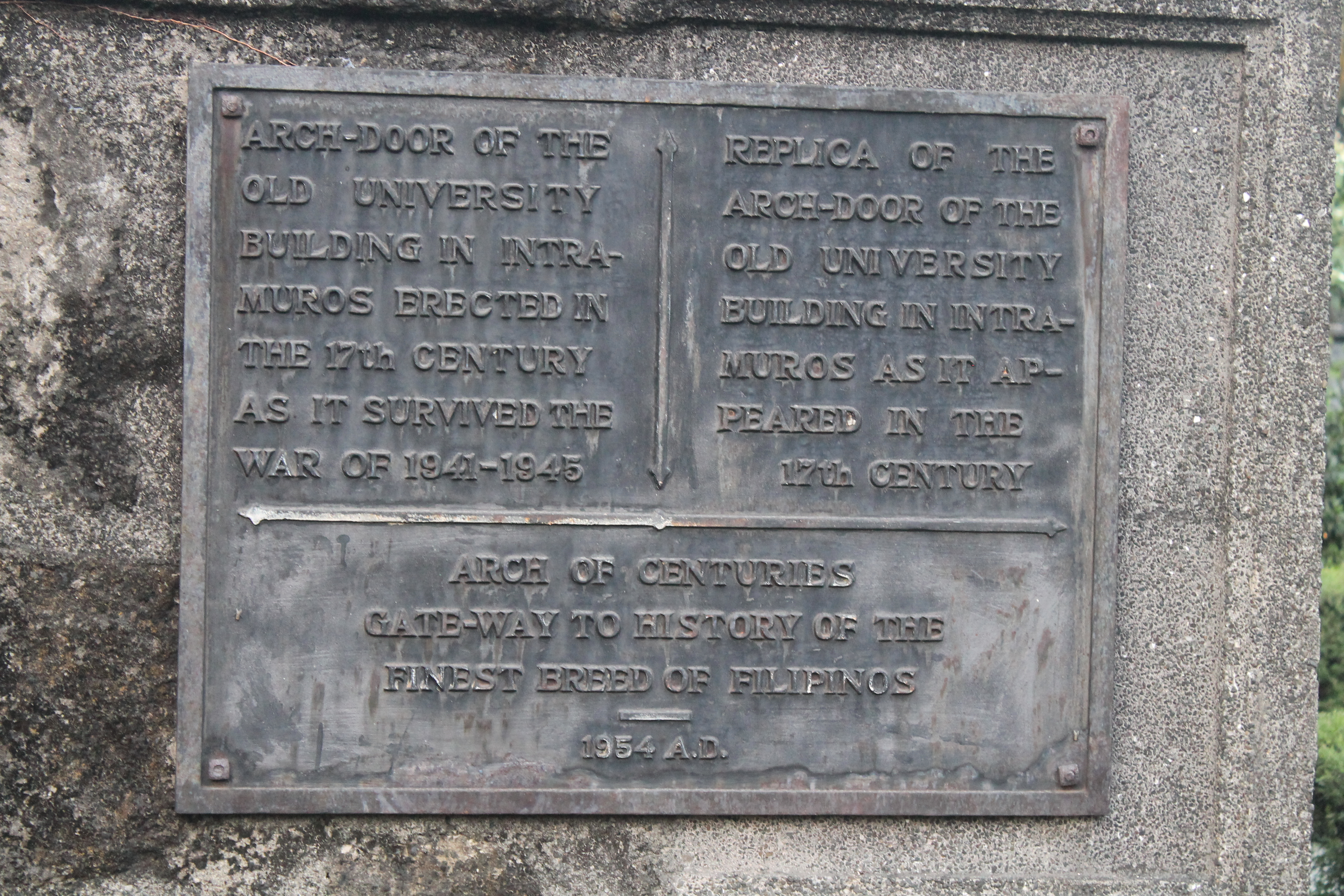

== Current traditions ==
Freshmen pass under the arch as part of the welcoming rites to the university. Candidates for graduation also pass through under the arch during a parade after their baccalaureate Mass.

There is an urban legend that claims prematurely exiting the arch before graduation would lead to a student’s debarment.

In 2015, Pope Francis passed through the arch during his visit to the university.
