= UST Plaza Intramuros =

Park in the University of Santo Tomas, Philippines

Coordinates: 14.6084°N 120.9908°E

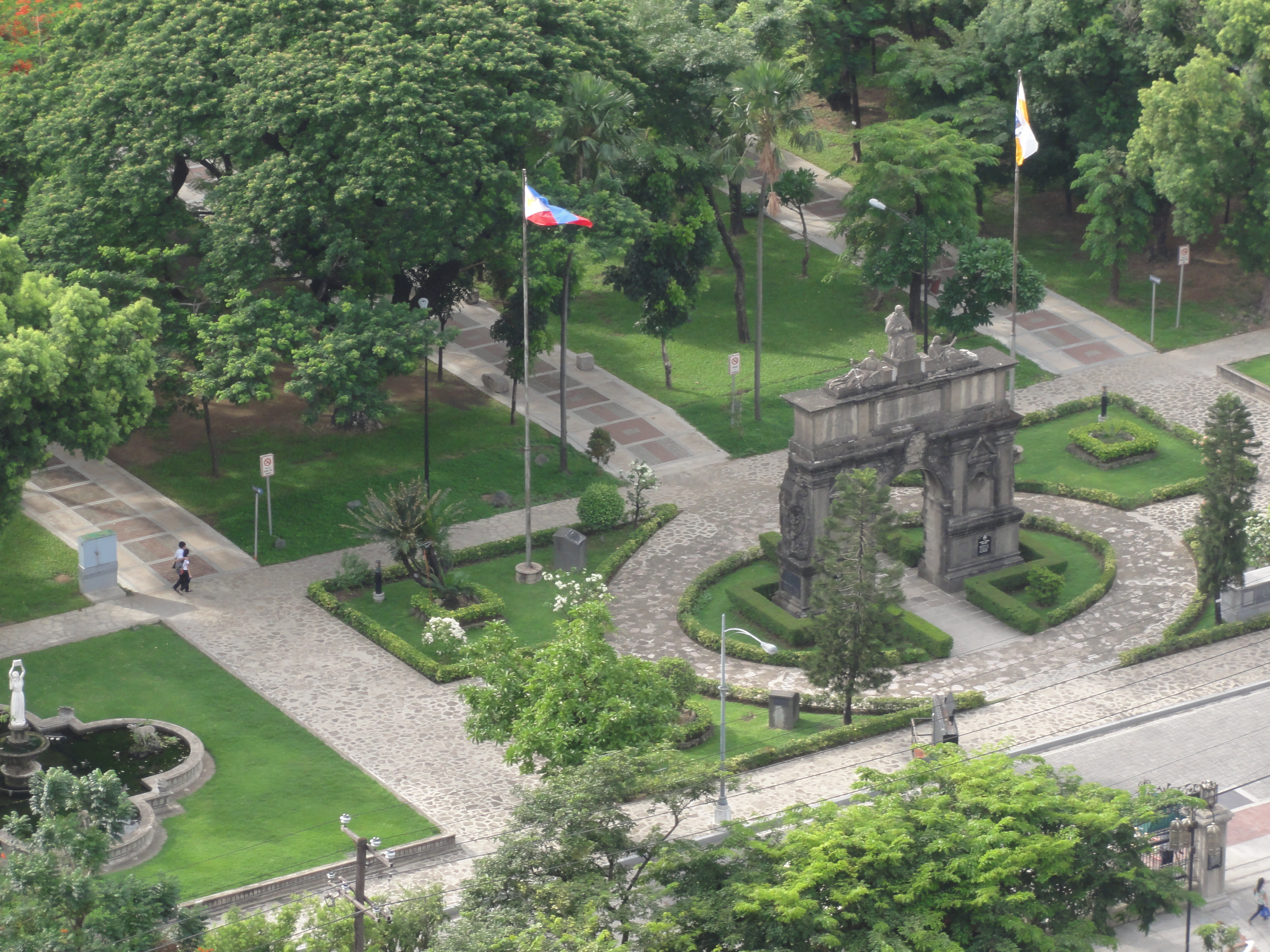
The Plaza Intramuros

The Plaza Intramuros is a park located in the University of Santo Tomas in Manila, Philippines. It contains the Arch of the Centuries, and two fountains: the Fountain of Wisdom, and Fountain of Knowledge.

== Park layout ==
The Arch of the Centuries prominently stands at the center of the Plaza Intramuros. The arch was the main doorway to the university when the campus was still in Intramuros from 1680 to 1941. The central lower section of the original facade was transferred piece by piece and reconstructed in the Manila campus in 1954. It is flanked by the Fountain of Wisdom and the Philippine flagpole to its west, and the Fountain of Knowledge and the UST flagpole to its east.

A university marker made of marble was unveiled in 2010. It features the name of the university and the foundation year. A time capsule was placed inside it after the baccalaureate mass in 2011. It contains the names of the class of 2011, the P200 UST commemorative bill, commemorative coins, other quadricentennial souvenir items, and news articles.

Before the university marker was constructed in 2010, UST did not have a sign on its entrance or in any of the buildings inside the campus. Also, the previous university seal only had the light blue shield and UST's symbols, and did not include any text. The Arch of the Centuries served as UST's signage.

== Fountains ==
=== Fountain of Wisdom ===
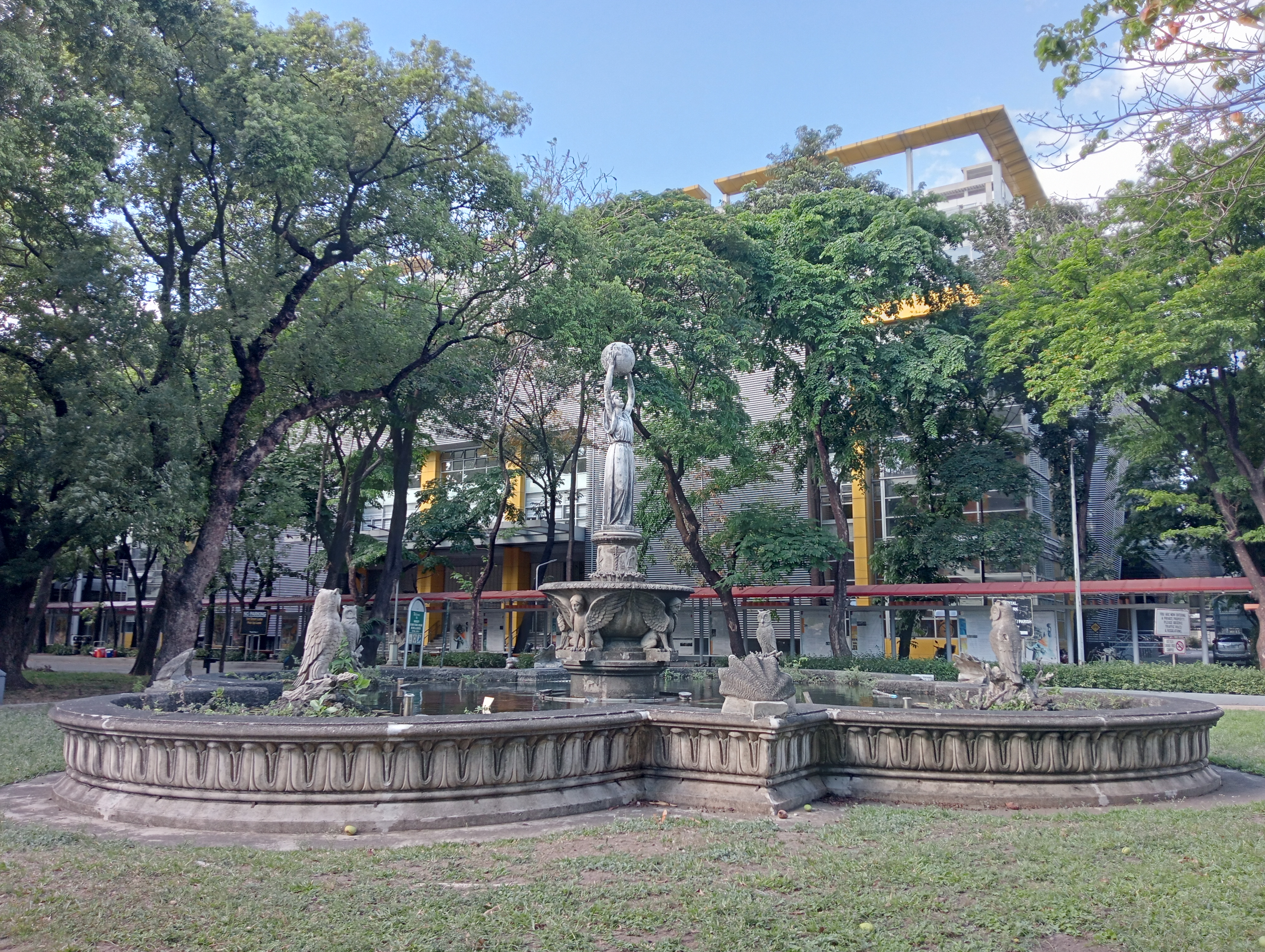
The Fountain of Wisdom

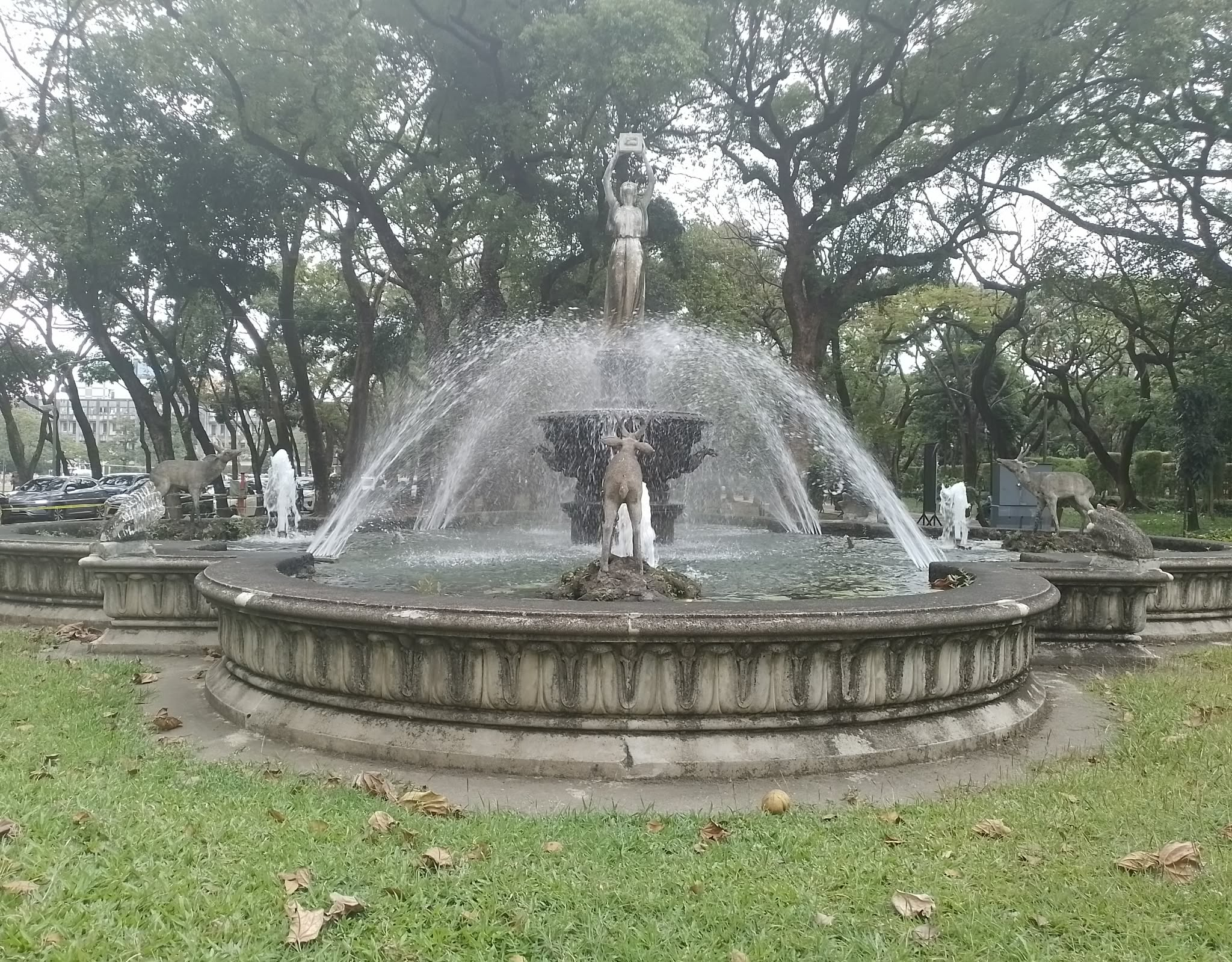
The Fountain of Knowledge with fountains in operation (2026)

Also called the Fountain of Divine Wisdom, it consists of a barbed quatrefoil-shaped basin. The fountain features a sculpture of a lady standing on top of a lotus flower while holding a bible. The bible's cover depicts the image of the Lamb of God. The lotus flower bowl is carried by four phoenixes. It is surrounded by four deers and open shells.

=== Fountain of Knowledge ===
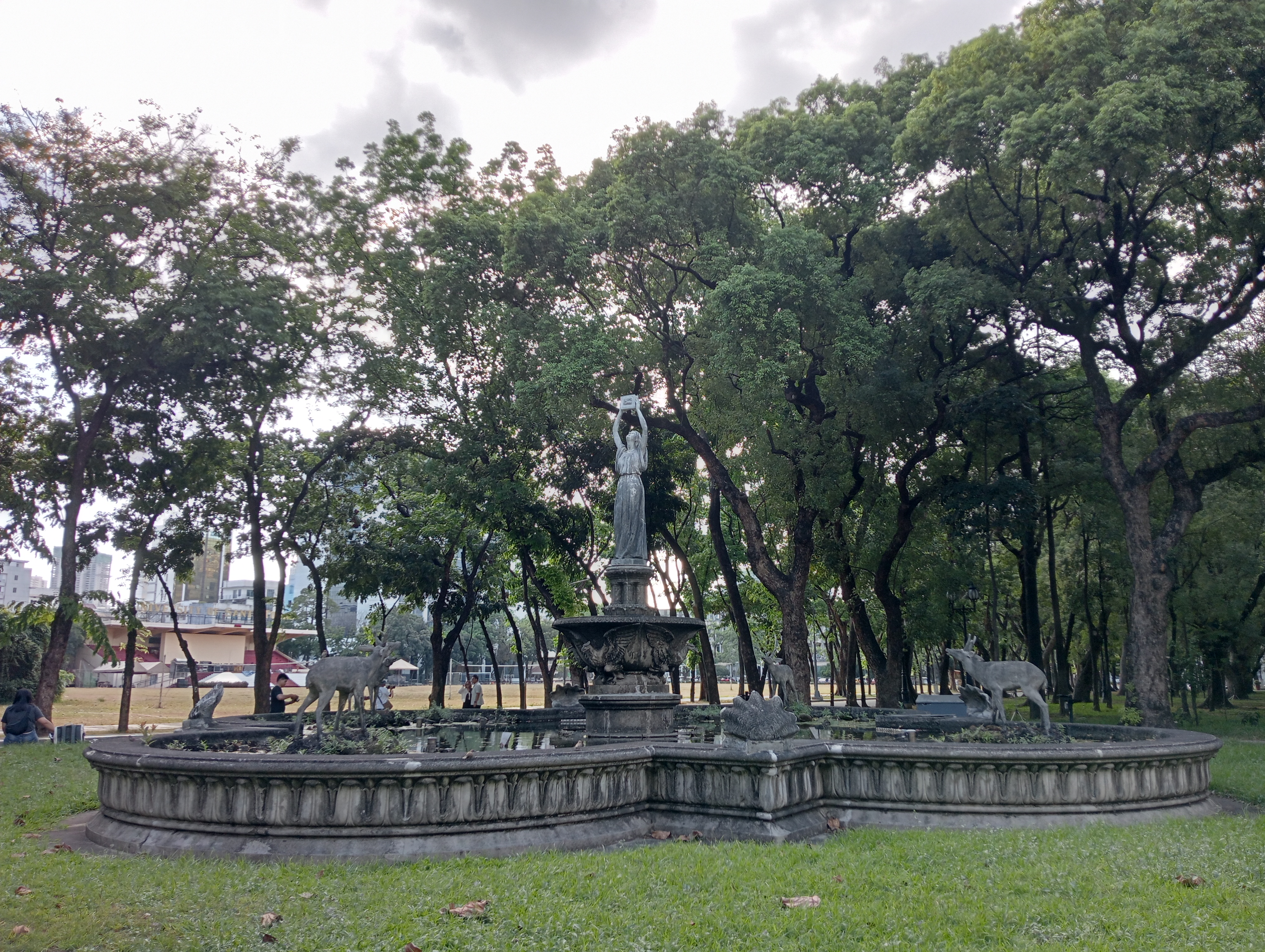
The Fountain of Knowledge

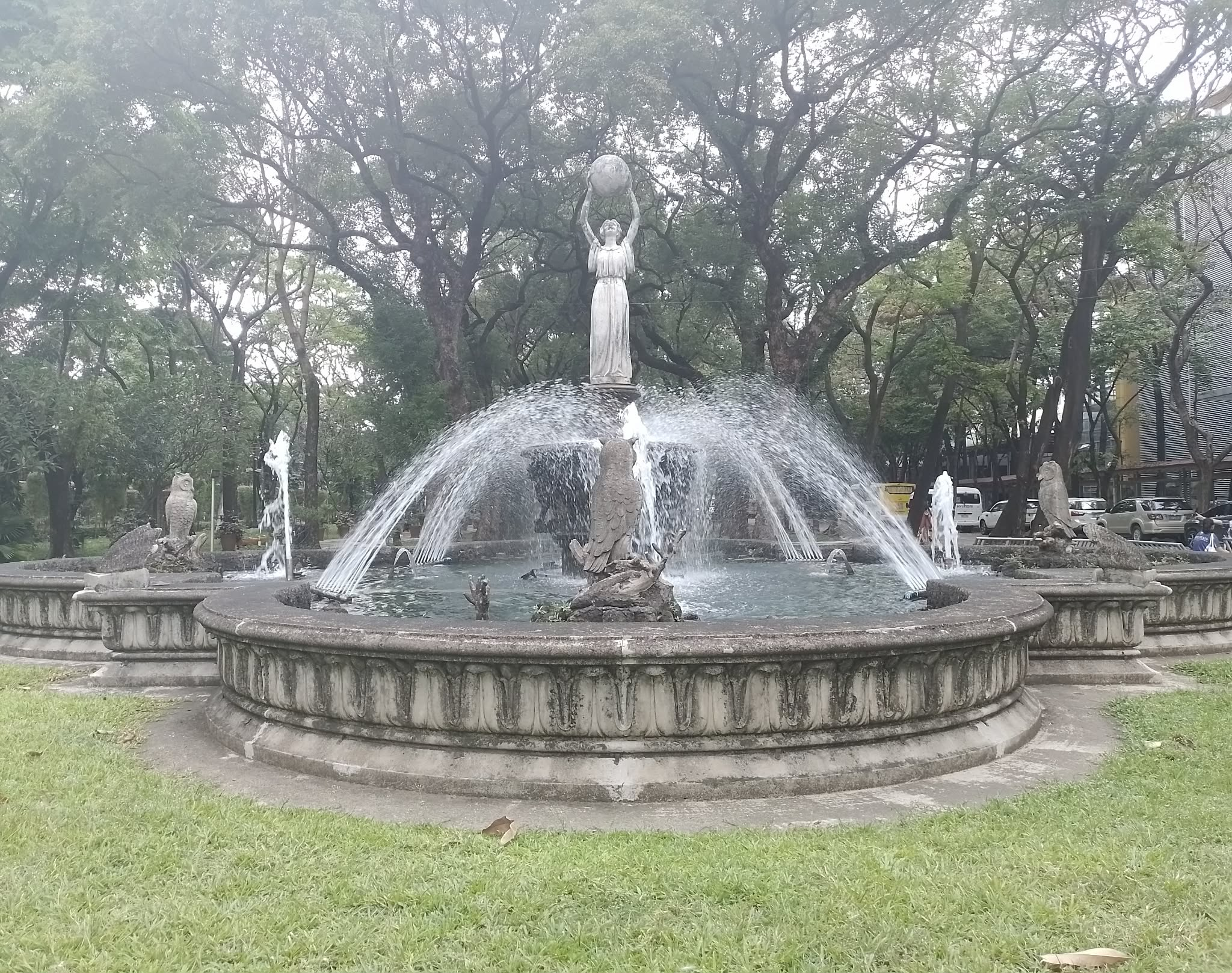
The Fountain of Divine Wisdom with fountains in operation (2026)

The fountain also features a sculpture of a lady on top of a lotus flower while holding a globe. The lady stands on a cylindrical pedestal adorned by the early disciplines offered in the university, namely the Caduceus for medicine, the Balance Scale for law, the Bowl of Hygieia for pharmacy, the ionic order for architecture, the atom for the sciences, and the total station and tripod for engineering. The lotus flower bowl is carried by four sphinxes. It is surrounded by four owls of Athena and open shells.

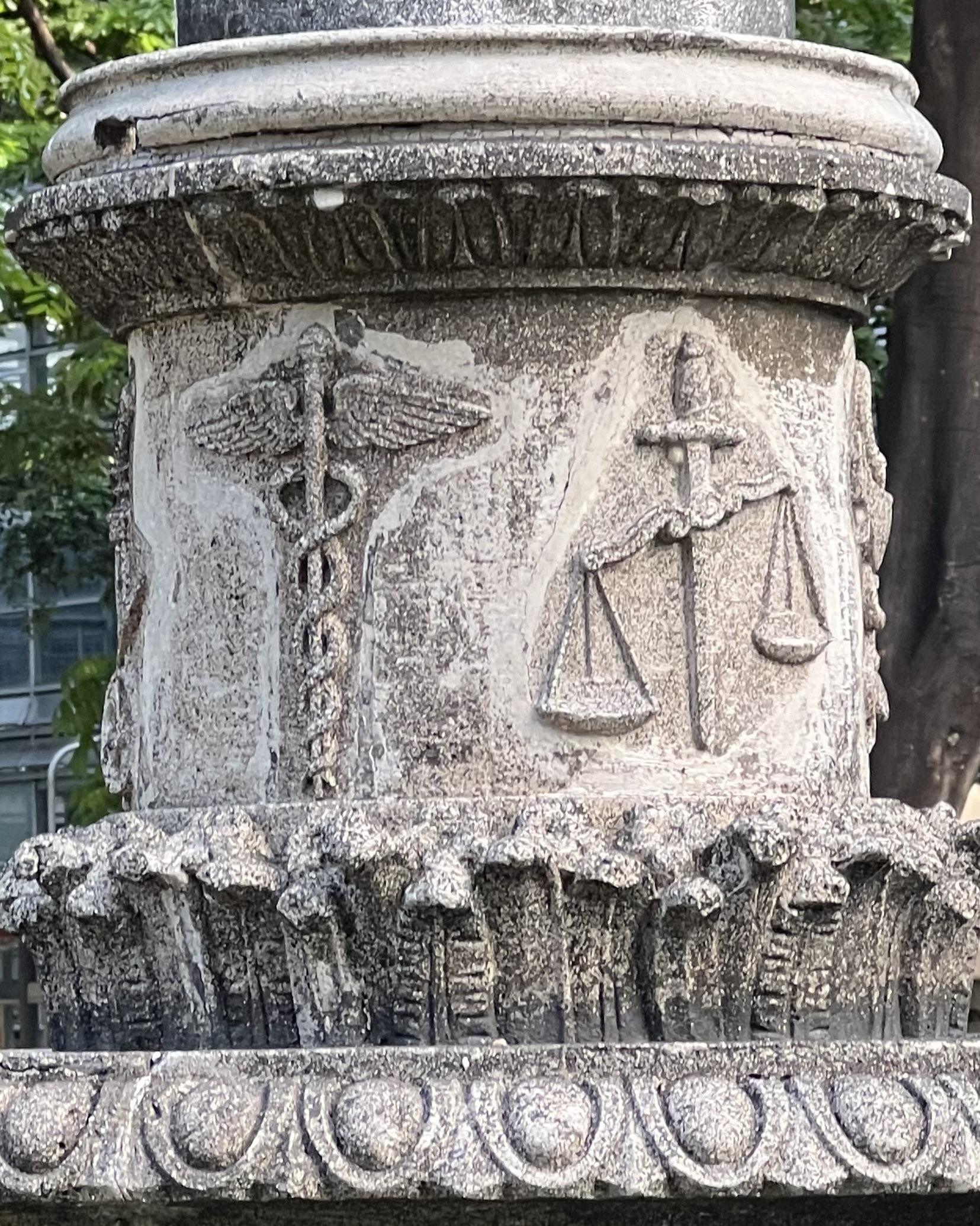

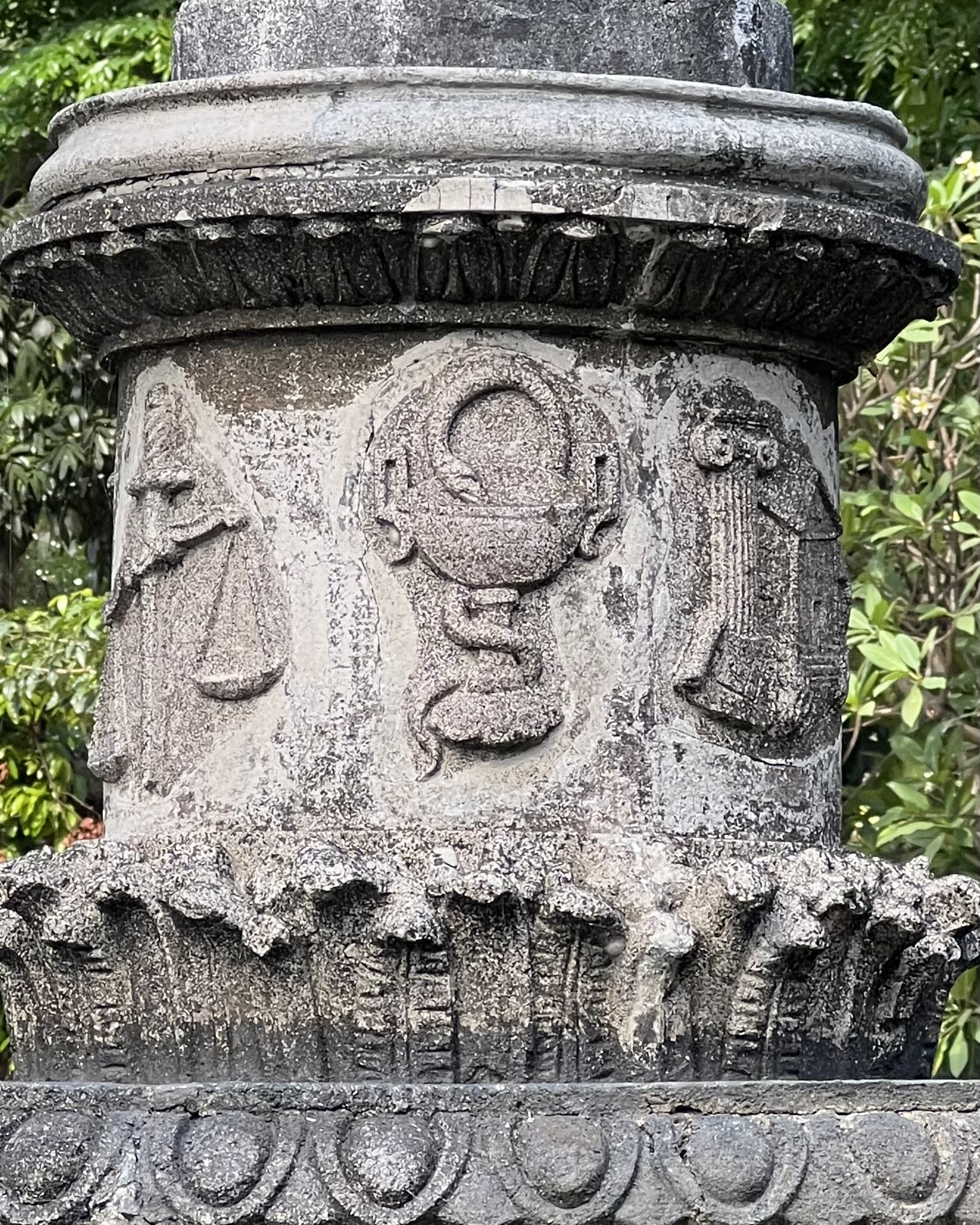

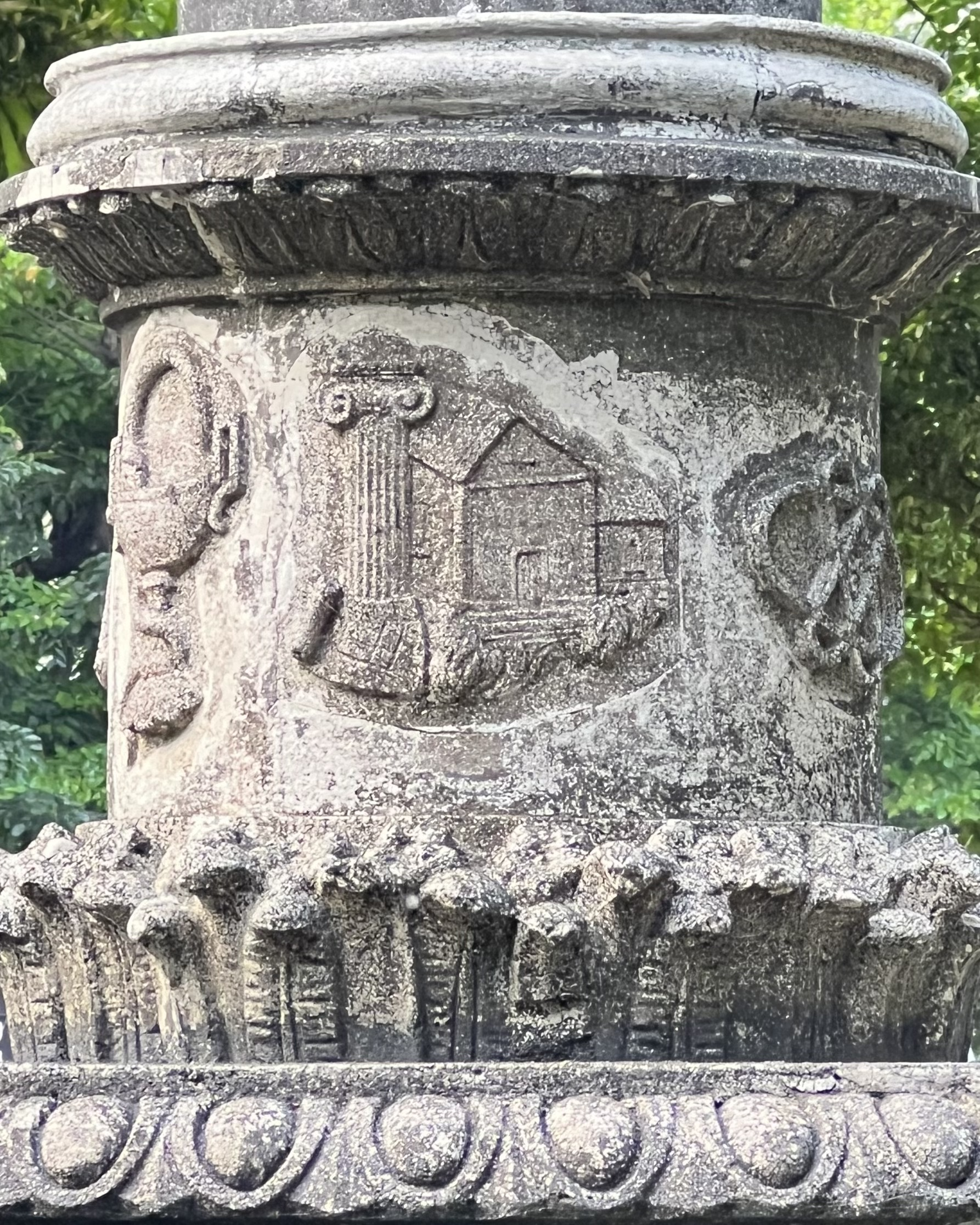

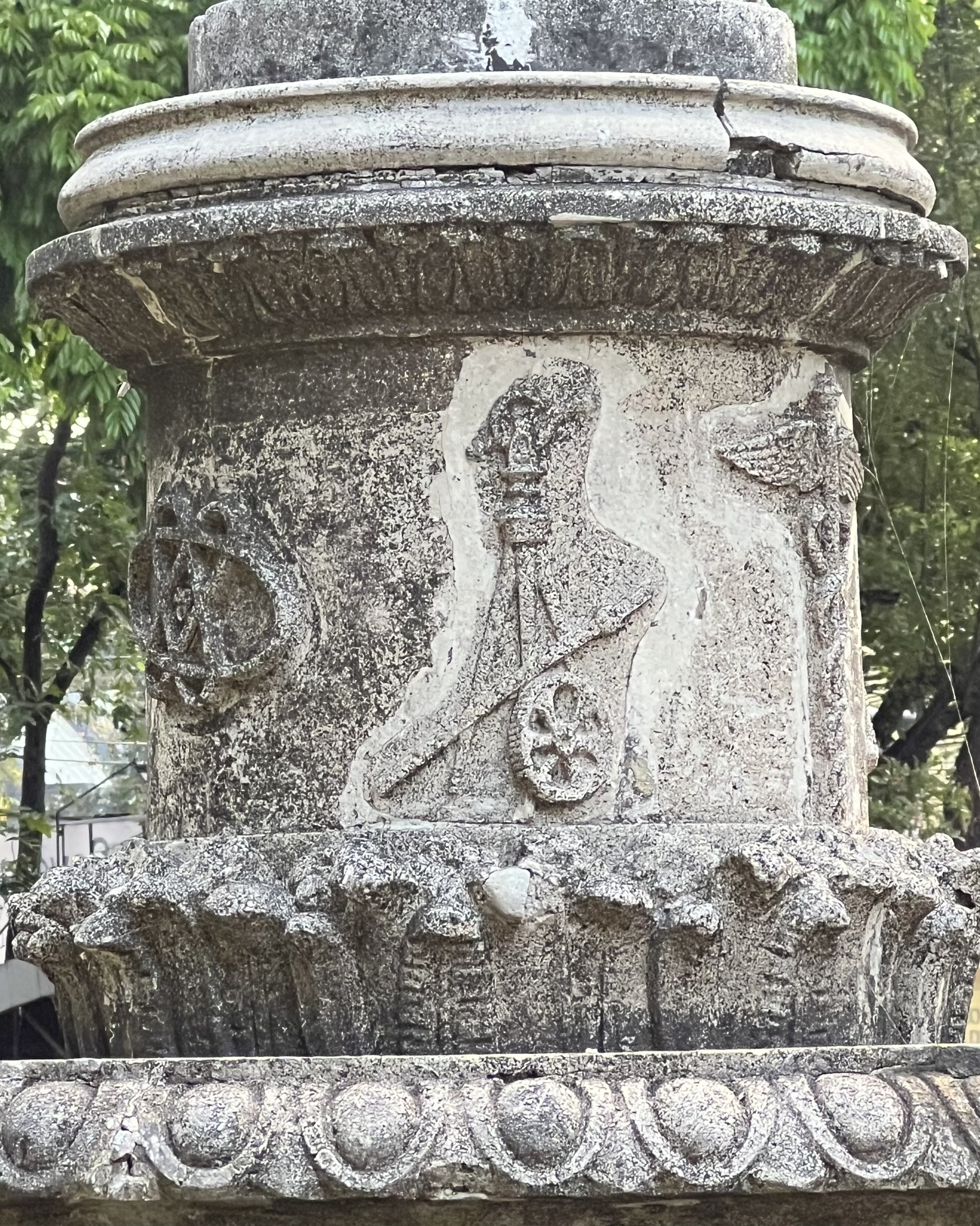

== Recent history ==
In 2015, Pope Francis entered the UST campus through the Arch of the Centuries. He was then escorted to a nearby papal chair to sign on the UST guestbook.

During the Paskuhan 2022, the Arch of the Centuries and the two fountains were lit with Philippine superhero-inspired lights.
