= University of Santo Tomas Field =

National Cultural Treasure in Manila

University of Santo Tomas Athletic Field and Open Spaces
- Hayag na Dako ng Pangunahing Istadyum (Filipino)
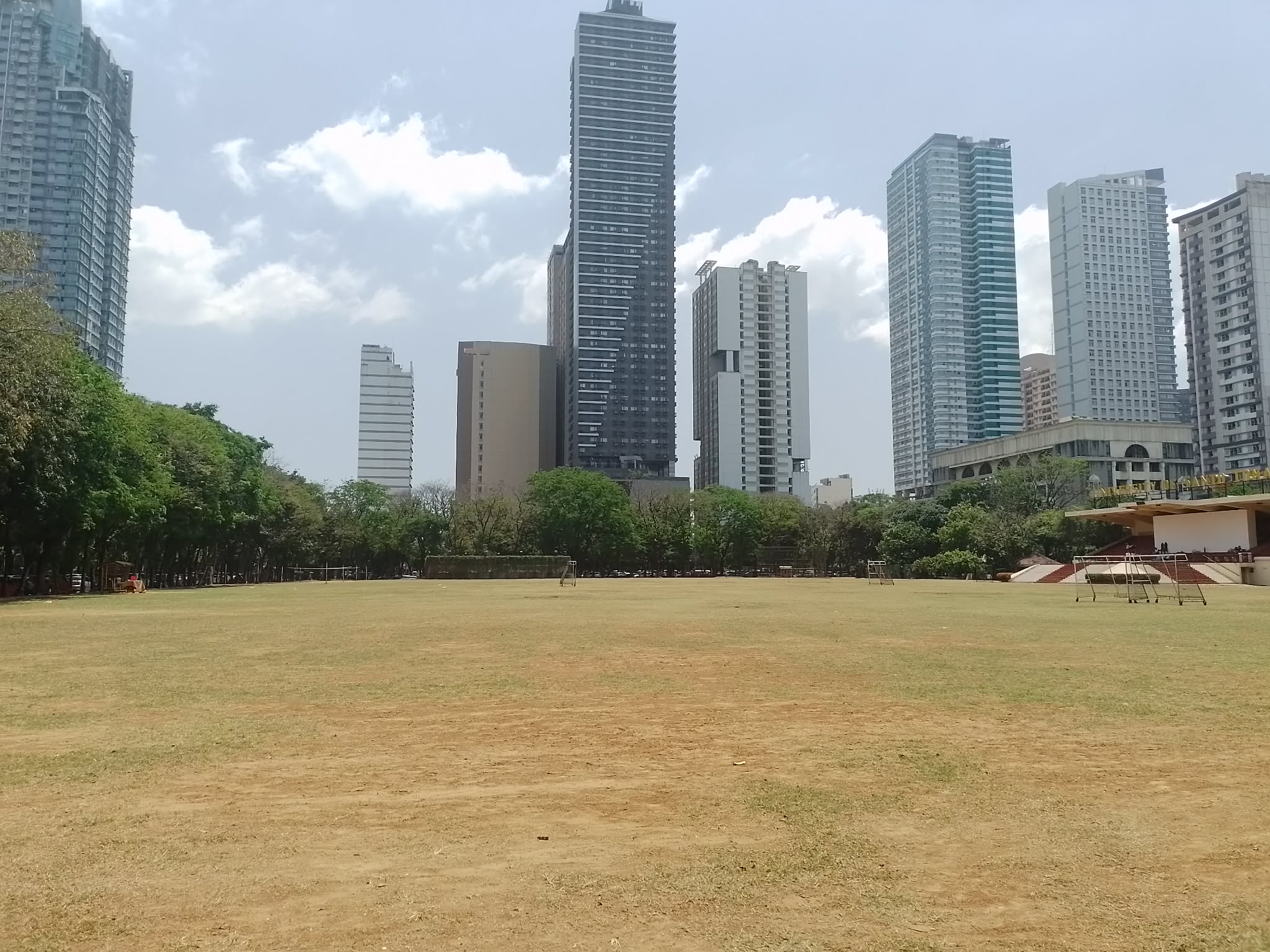

- Location of the UST Field University of Santo Tomas Field (Metro Manila)
- 14°36′30.4″N 120°59′21.8″E
- Location: University of Santo Tomas, Manila, Philippines

National Cultural Treasures
- Designated: January 25, 2010
- Reference no.: 1–2010

The University of Santo Tomas Athletic Field and Open Spaces, located at the University of Santo Tomas in Manila, is a National Cultural Treasure as declared by the National Museum of the Philippines.

== History ==
The campus grounds are noteworthy for various events such as the internment of American and other nationals during World War II, the Battle of Manila, and the four papal visits. The grounds have been transformed from the original swamp with a creek crossing over it to a well-kept green field that has become the single biggest open green area in Manila. It was significant because three pontiffs made appearance here, Pope Paul VI in 1970, Pope John Paul II in 1981 and 1995 and Pope Francis in 2015.

== Official declaration ==
Section 3 of “The Cultural Properties Preservation and Protection Act” states that a “National Cultural Treasure is a unique object found locally, possessing outstanding historical, cultural, artistic and/or scientific value which is significant and important to this country and nation.” This prestigious recognition marks the first ever inclusion of an educational institution among the ranks of National Cultural Treasures, with the majority of structures being churches and the rest being terrestrial landmarks, intangible cultural property and movable objects." As heritage sites, they will be accorded protection and recognition, giving importance to their witness of 400 years of tumultuous Philippine history.

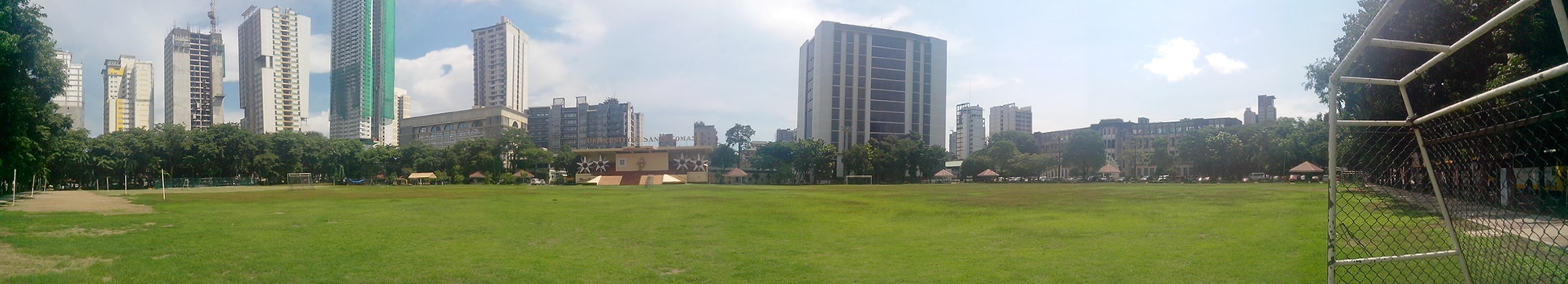
Panorama of the UST Open Field

== Gallery ==
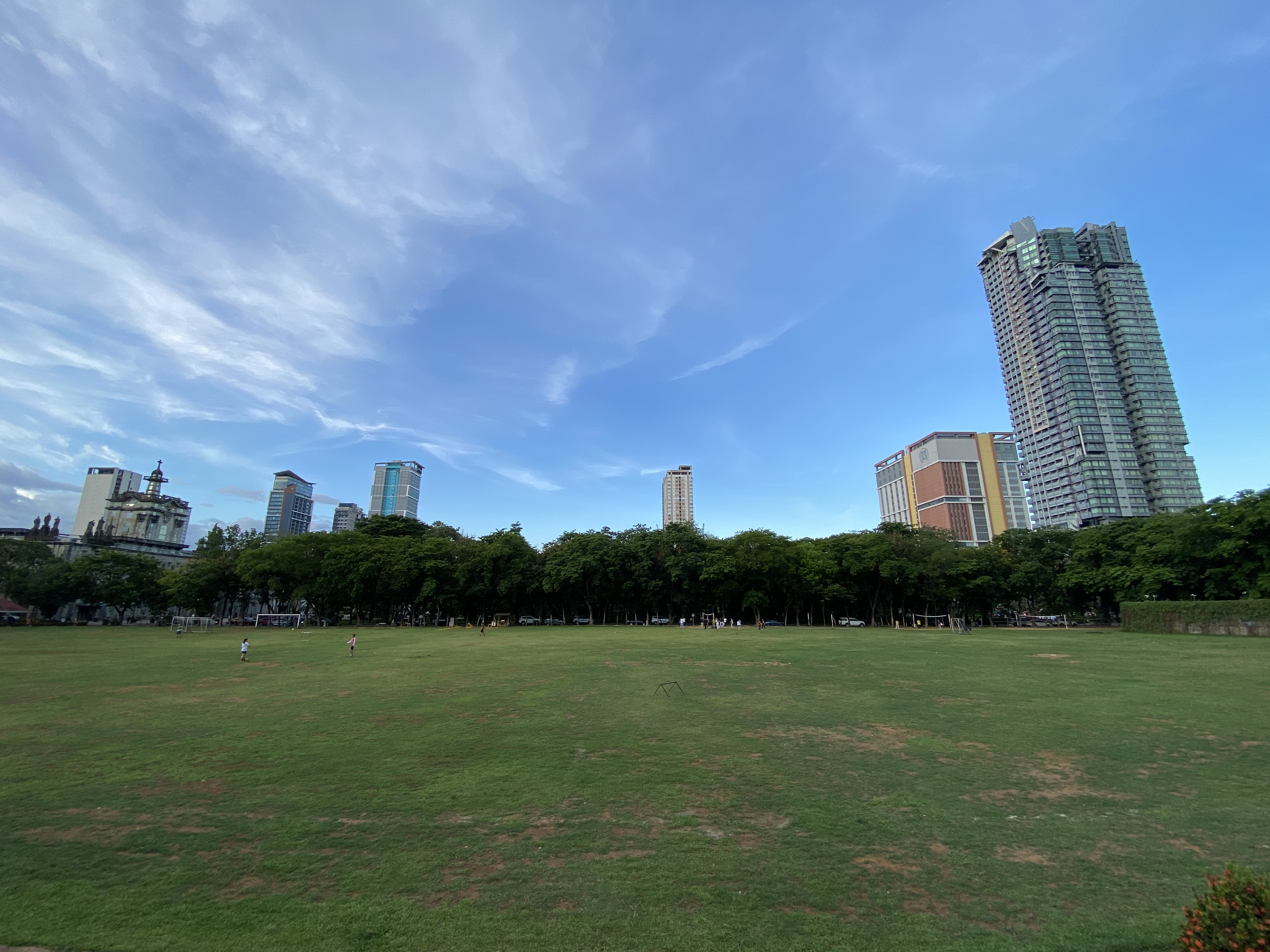
The field as seen from the grandstand

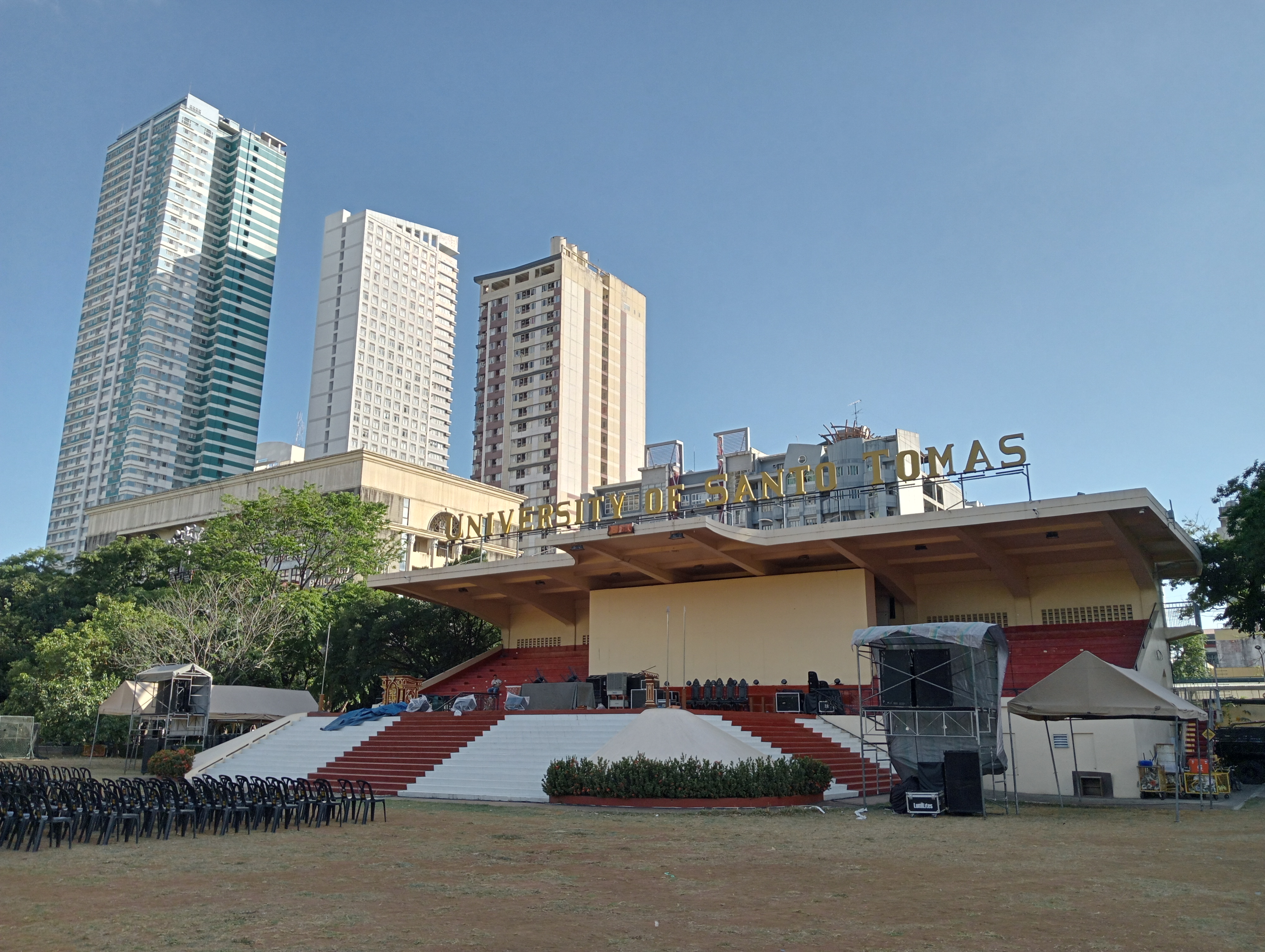
The grandstand

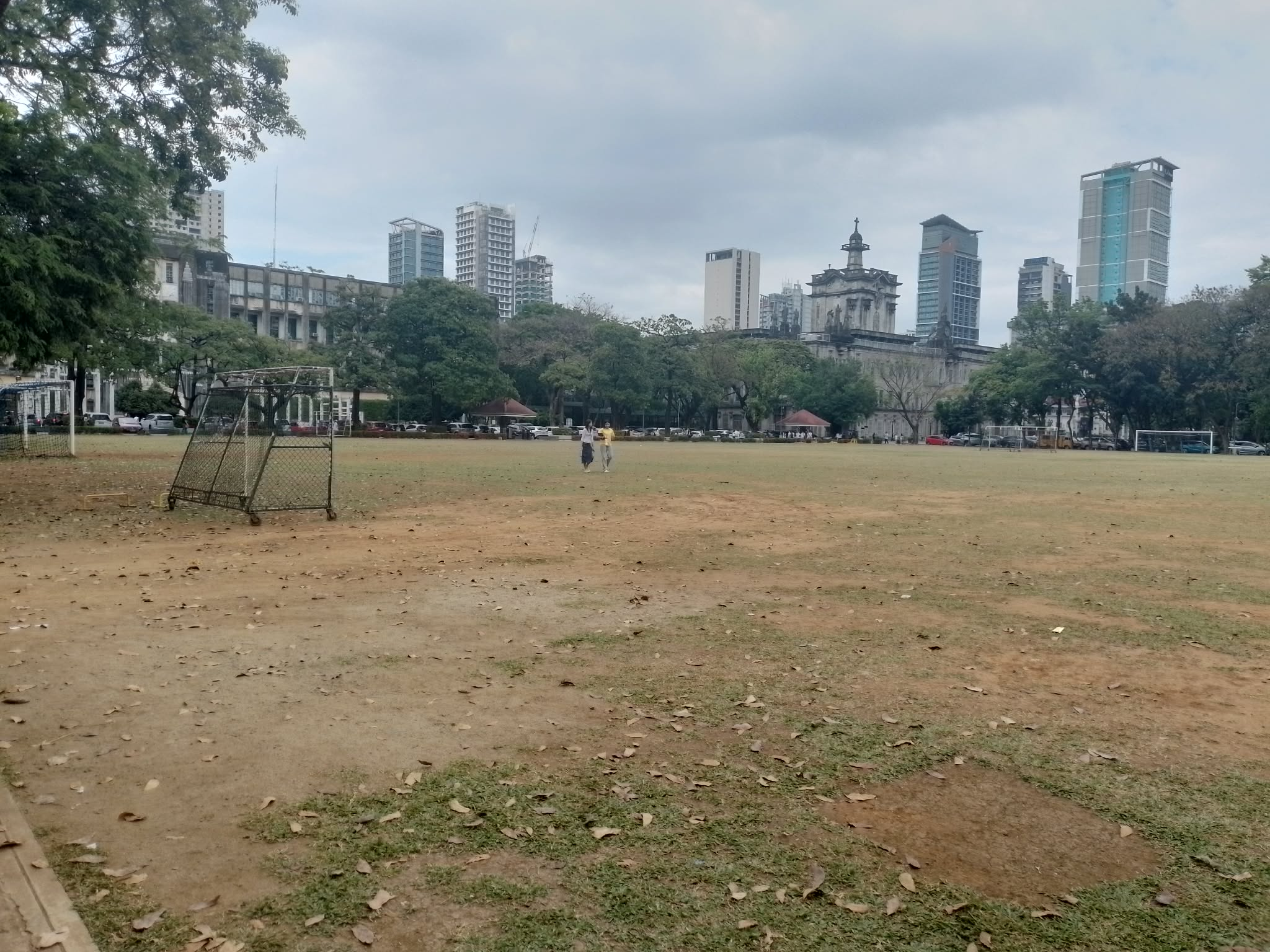
Football field

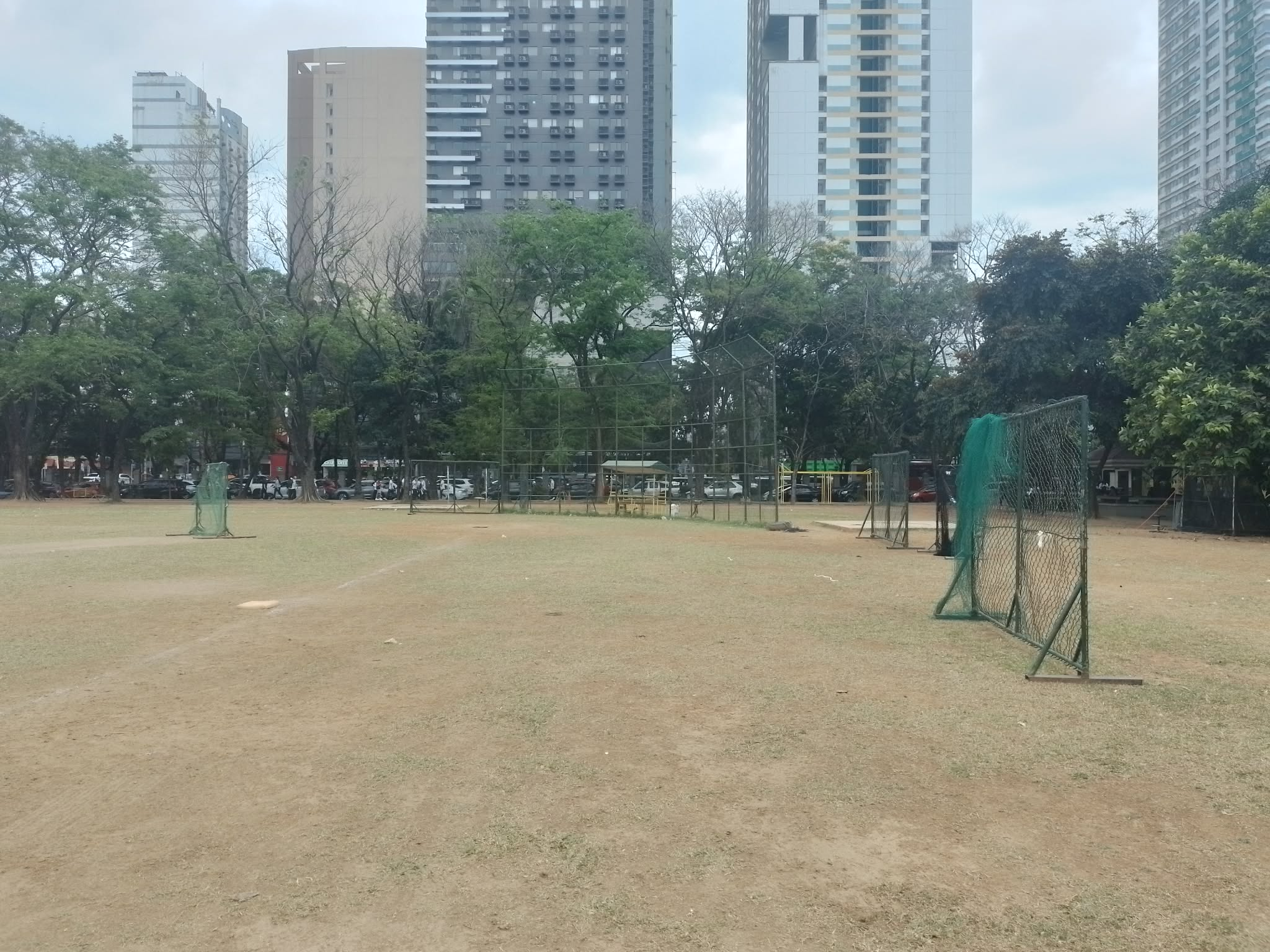
Baseball and softball practice venue

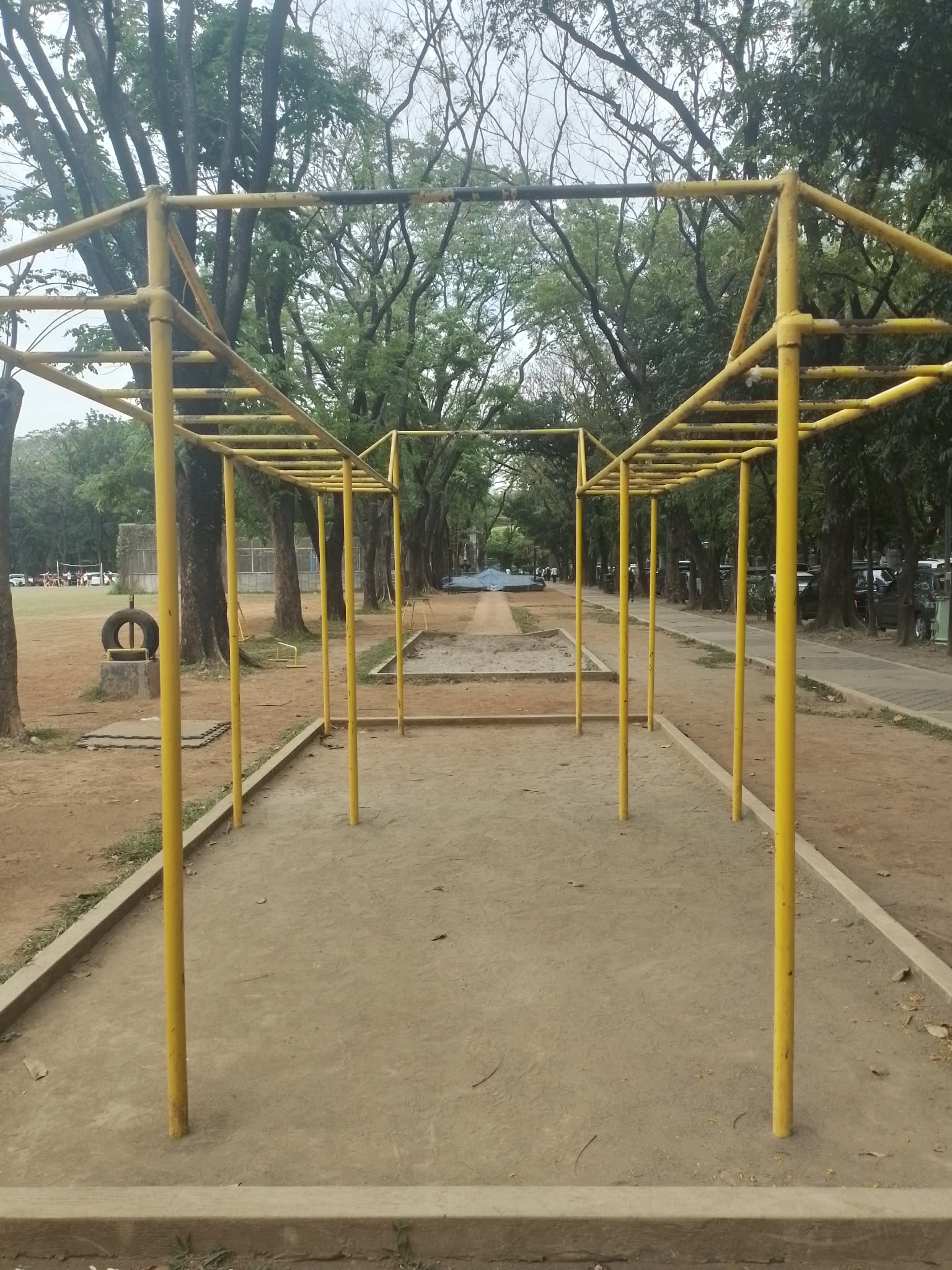
Obstacle course

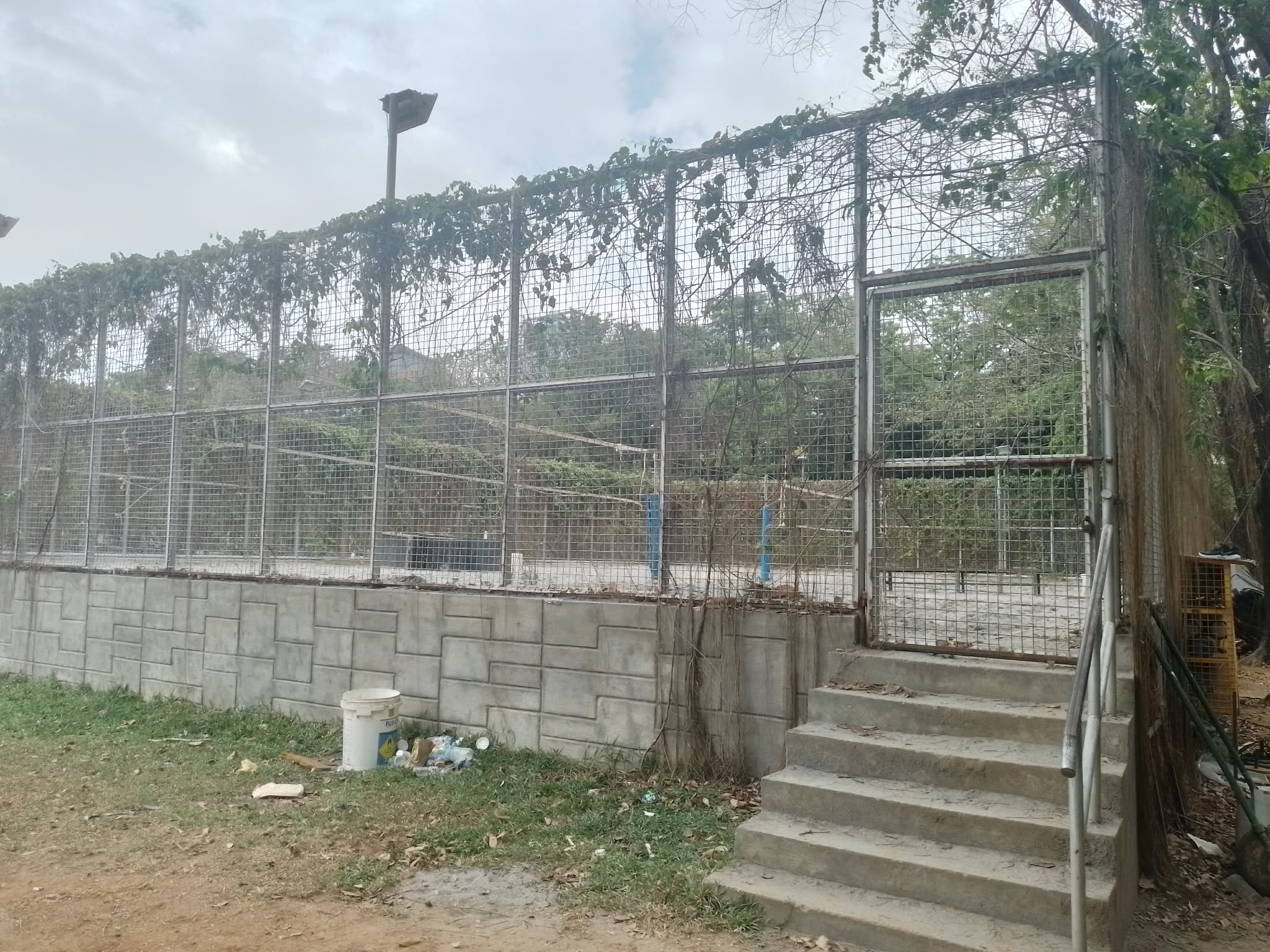
Beach volleyball court

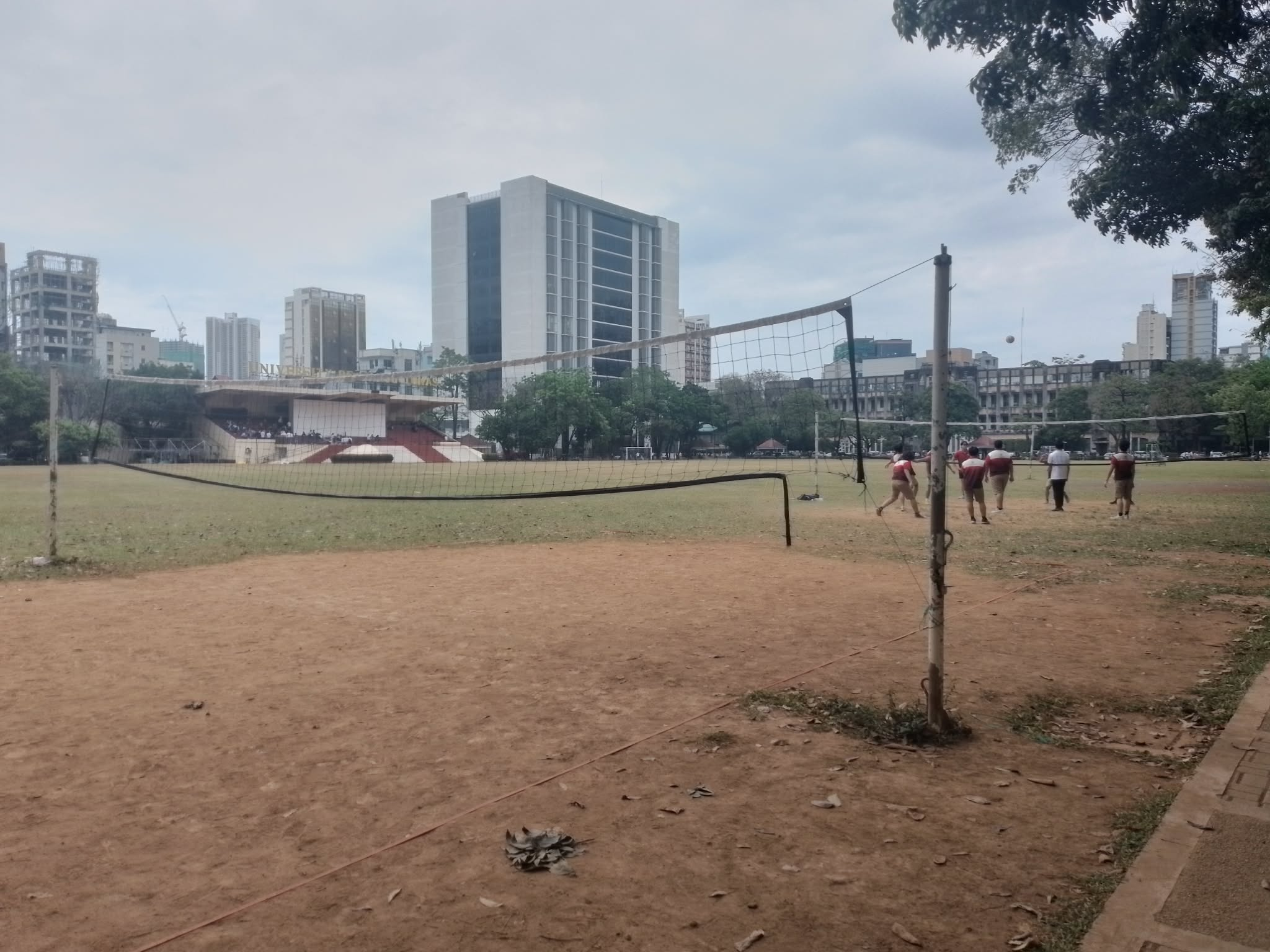
Volleyball courts
