= Benavides Monument =

Memorial in Manila

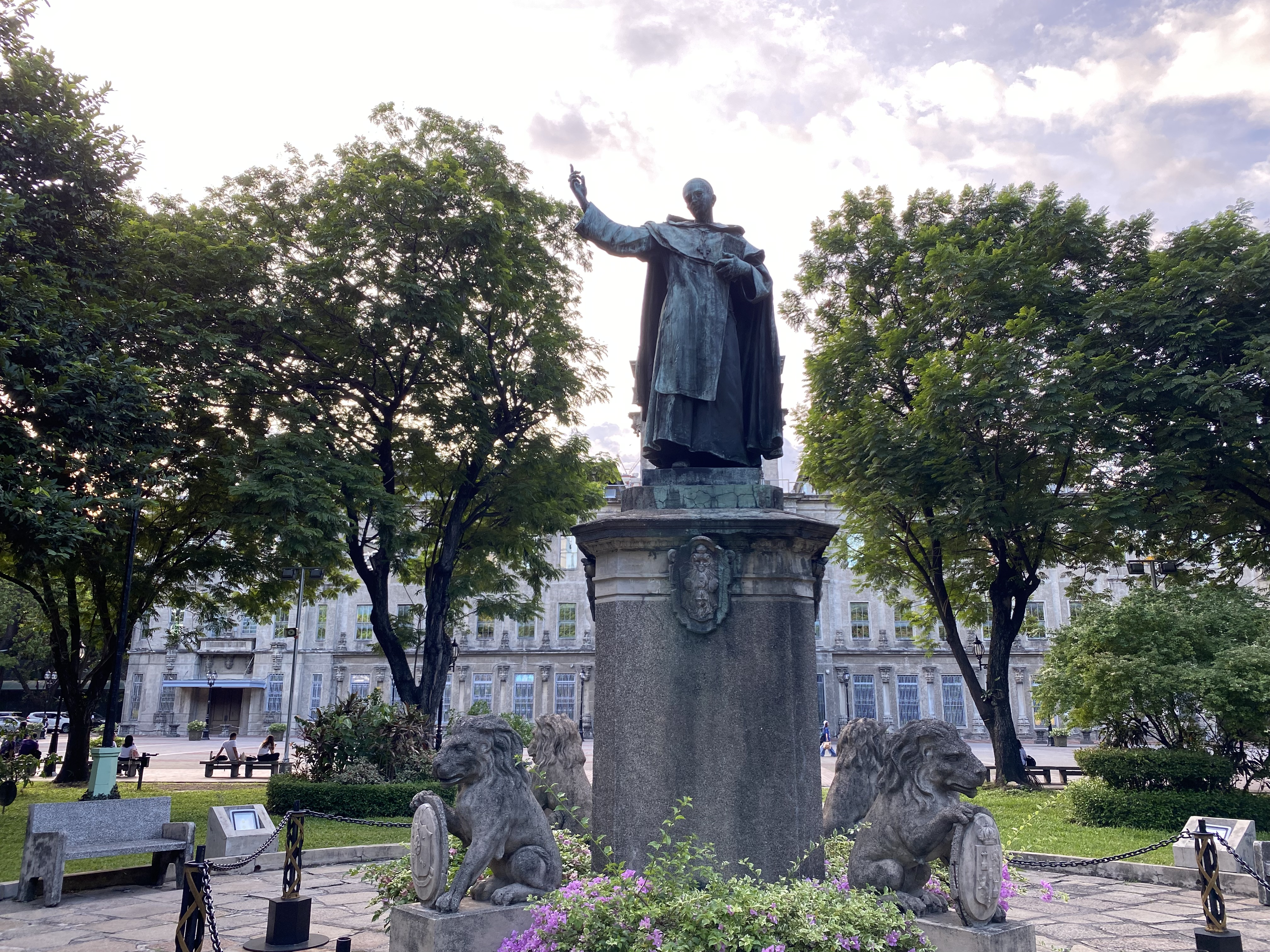
- Location: UST Plaza Benavides, Manila
- Designer: French: Tony Noël
- Material: Bronze
- Completion date: 1889
- Opening date: July 2, 1891
- Dedicated to: Miguel de Benavides

The Benavides Monument is a memorial in the University of Santo Tomas in Manila, Philippines built to commemorate the founder of the University of Santo Tomas, Miguel de Benavides. Located in the Plaza Benavides in front of the UST Main Building, the monument consists of a bronze statue of Benavides rising on top of a granite pedestal. The present monument was unveiled in 1946.

== History ==
The Benavides statue first stood in the Plaza de Santo Tomas in front of the original campus in Intramuros.

== Design ==
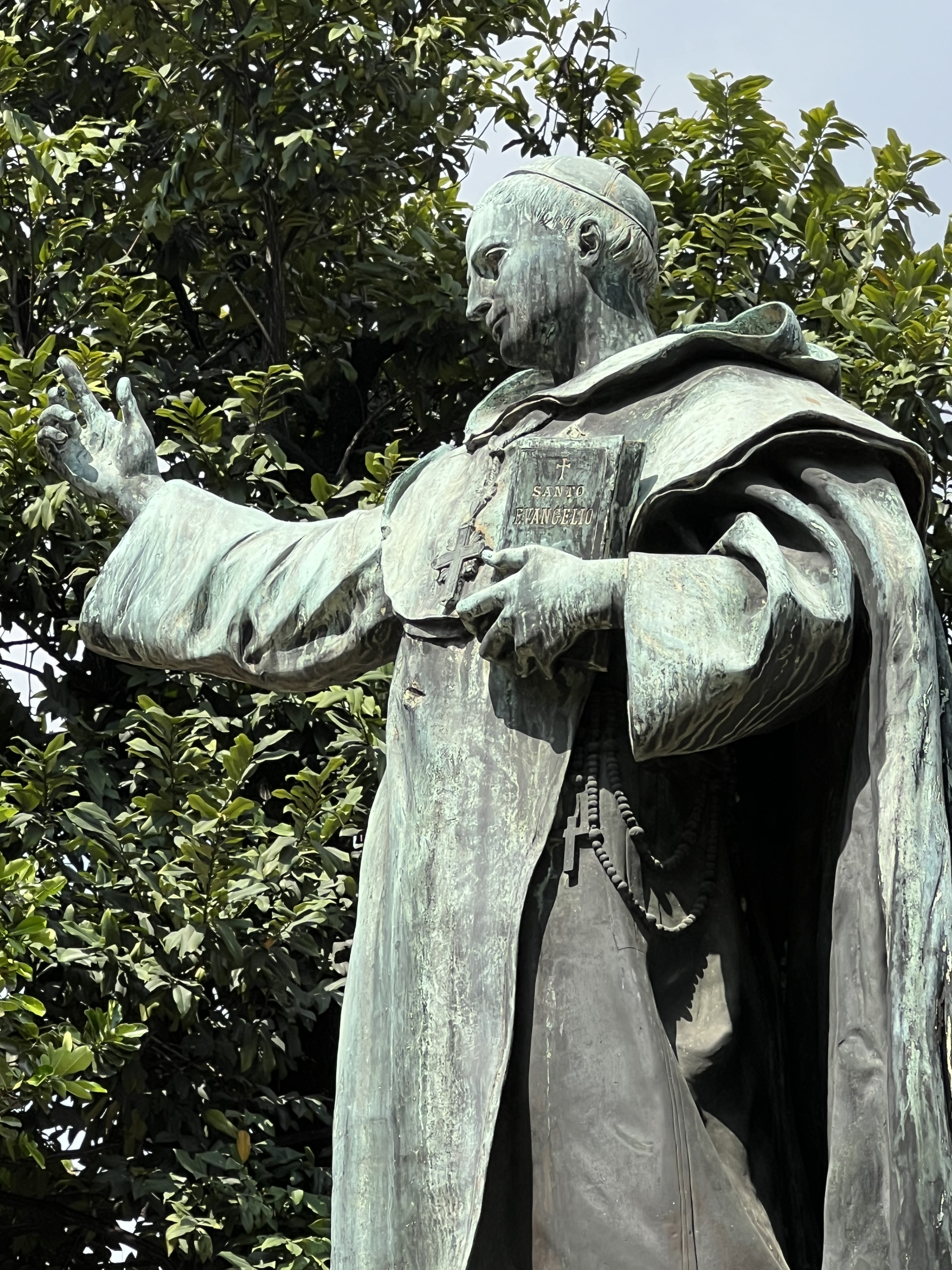
Benavides holding the Santo Evangelio.

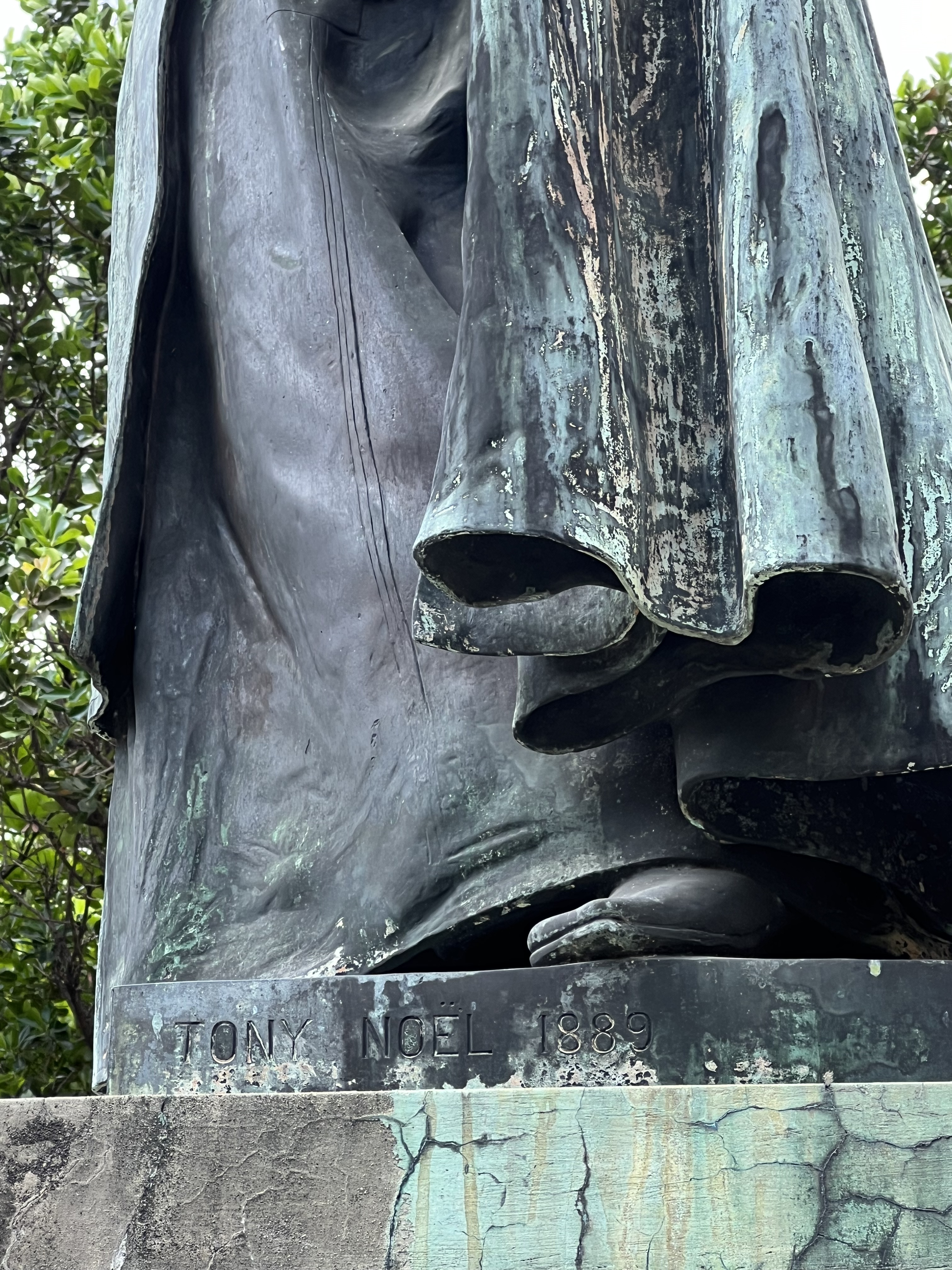
The sculptor's name at the base of the statue.

The pedestal is flanked at the base by four seated lions.

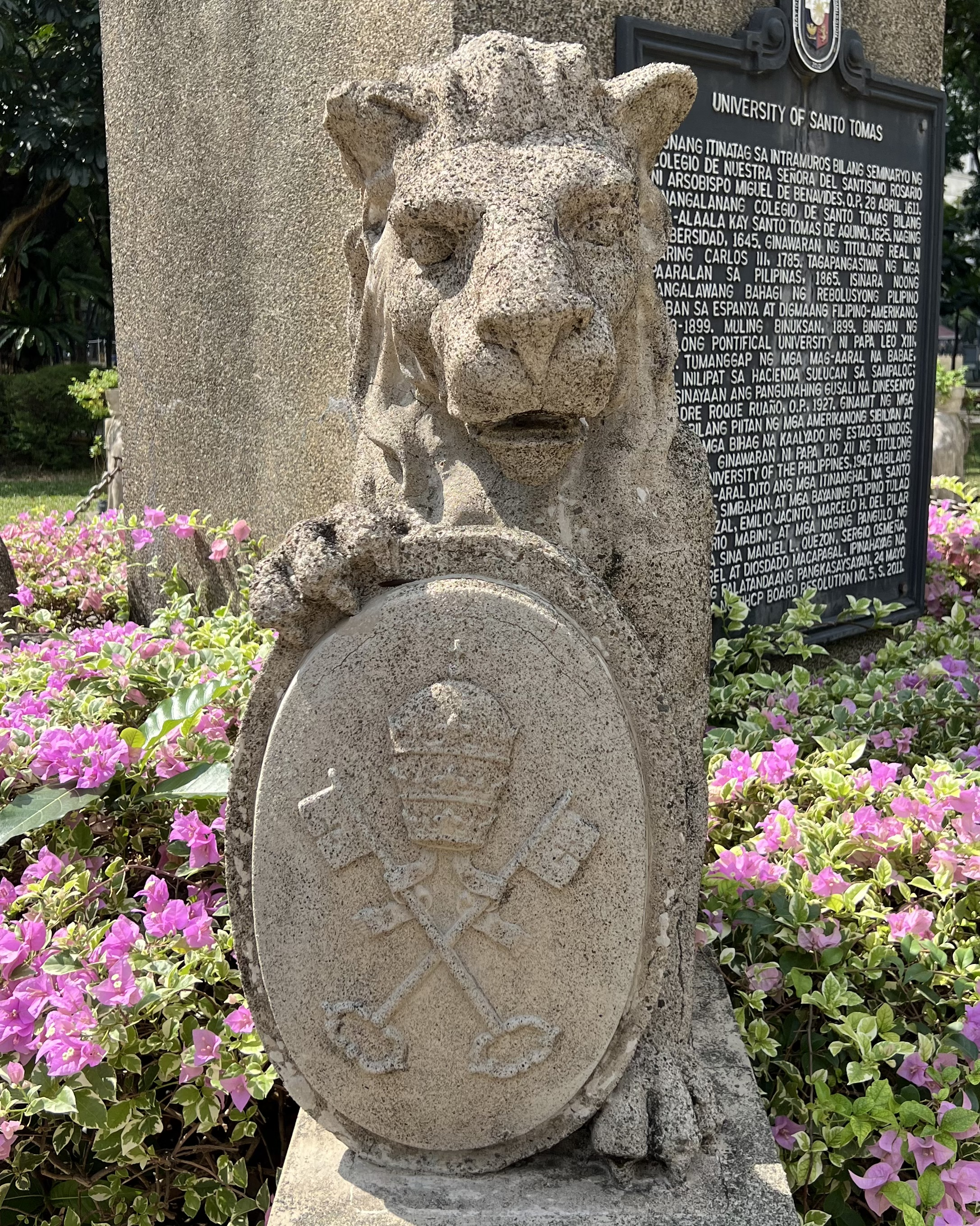
Coat of arms of the Holy See

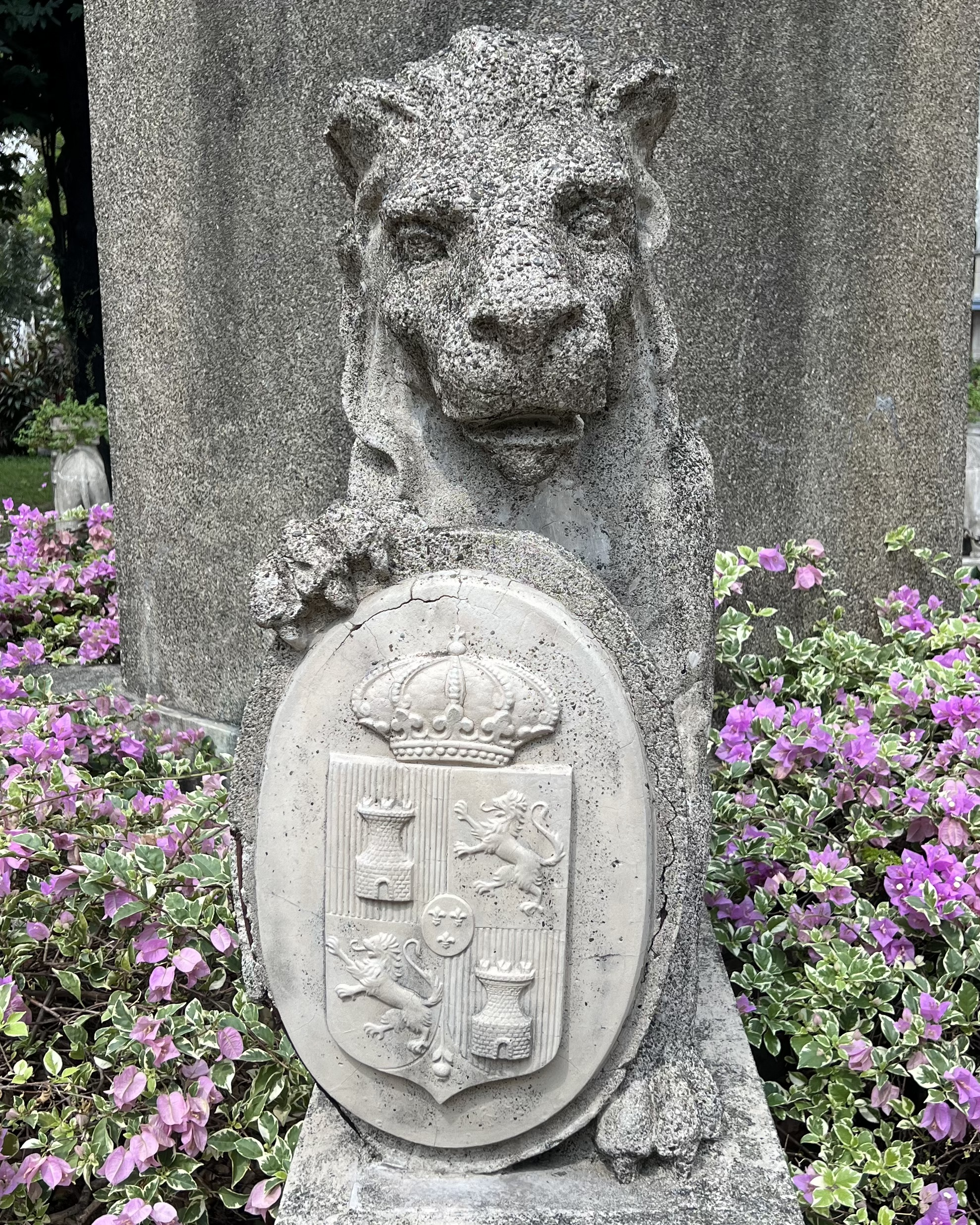
Coat of arms similar to the coat of arms of Spain used in 1700-1868 and 1834-1930

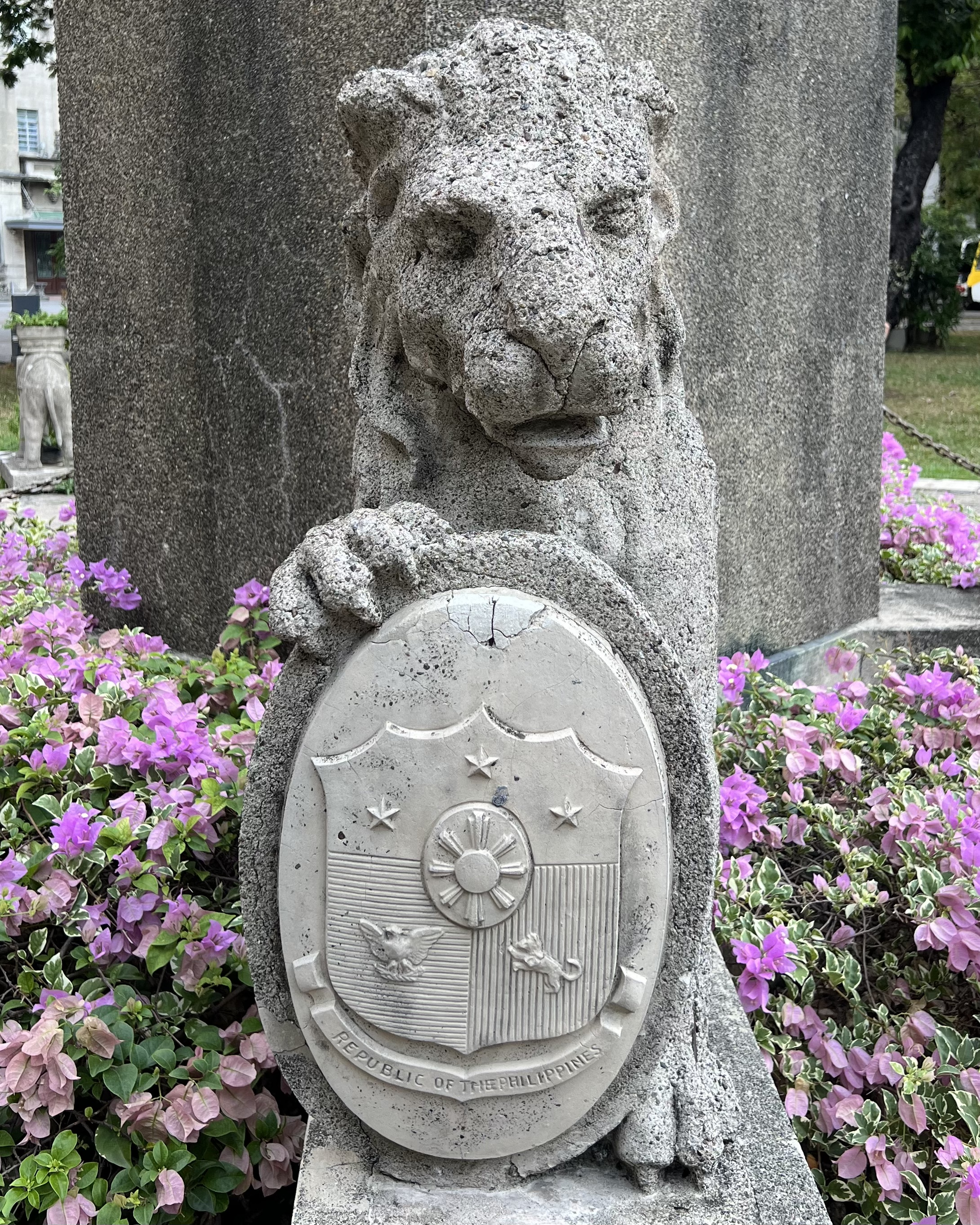
Coat of arms of the Philippines

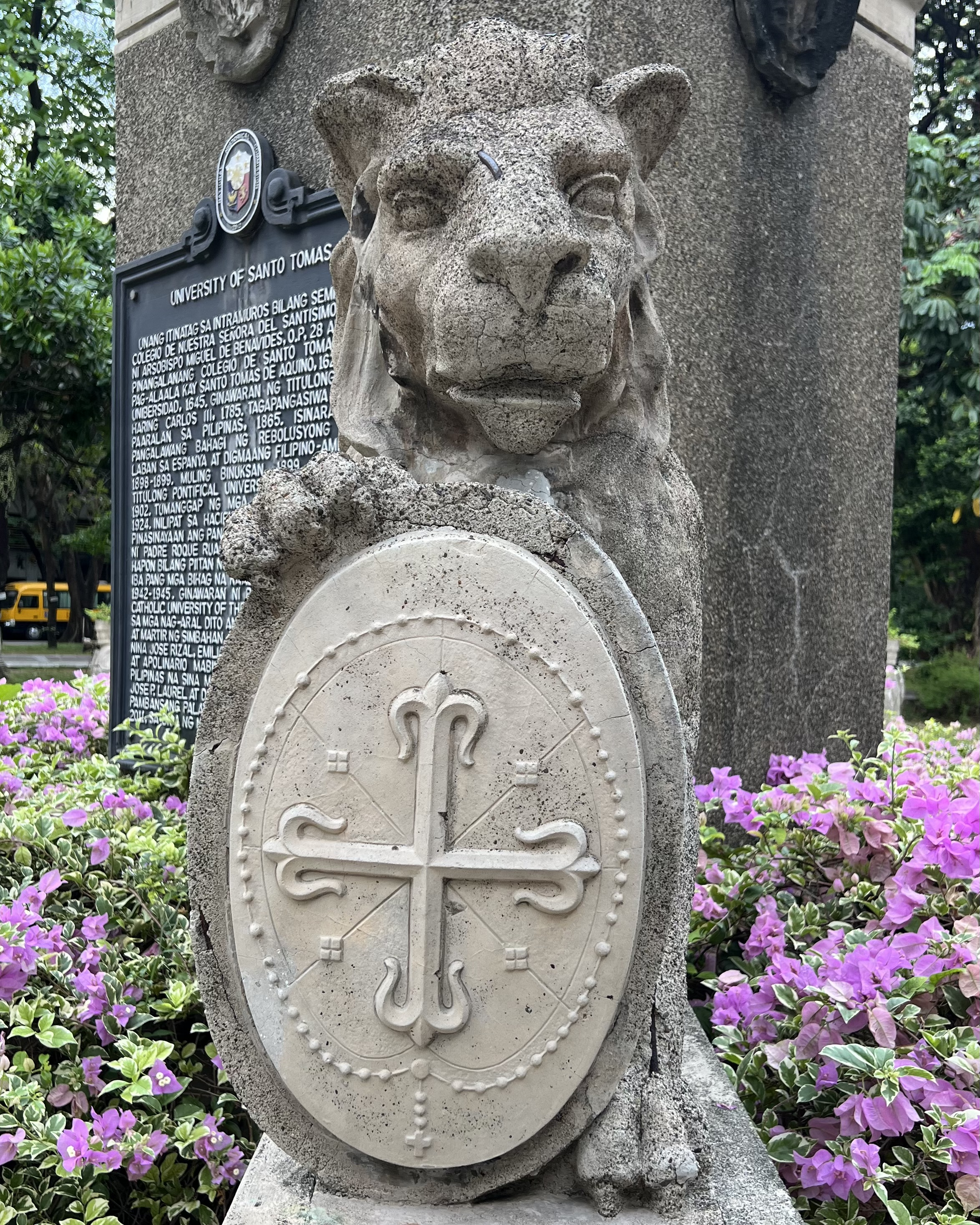
Cross of the Dominican Order

The old university seal is featured on each side of the pedestal. Encircling the monument are eight elephants carrying a vase.

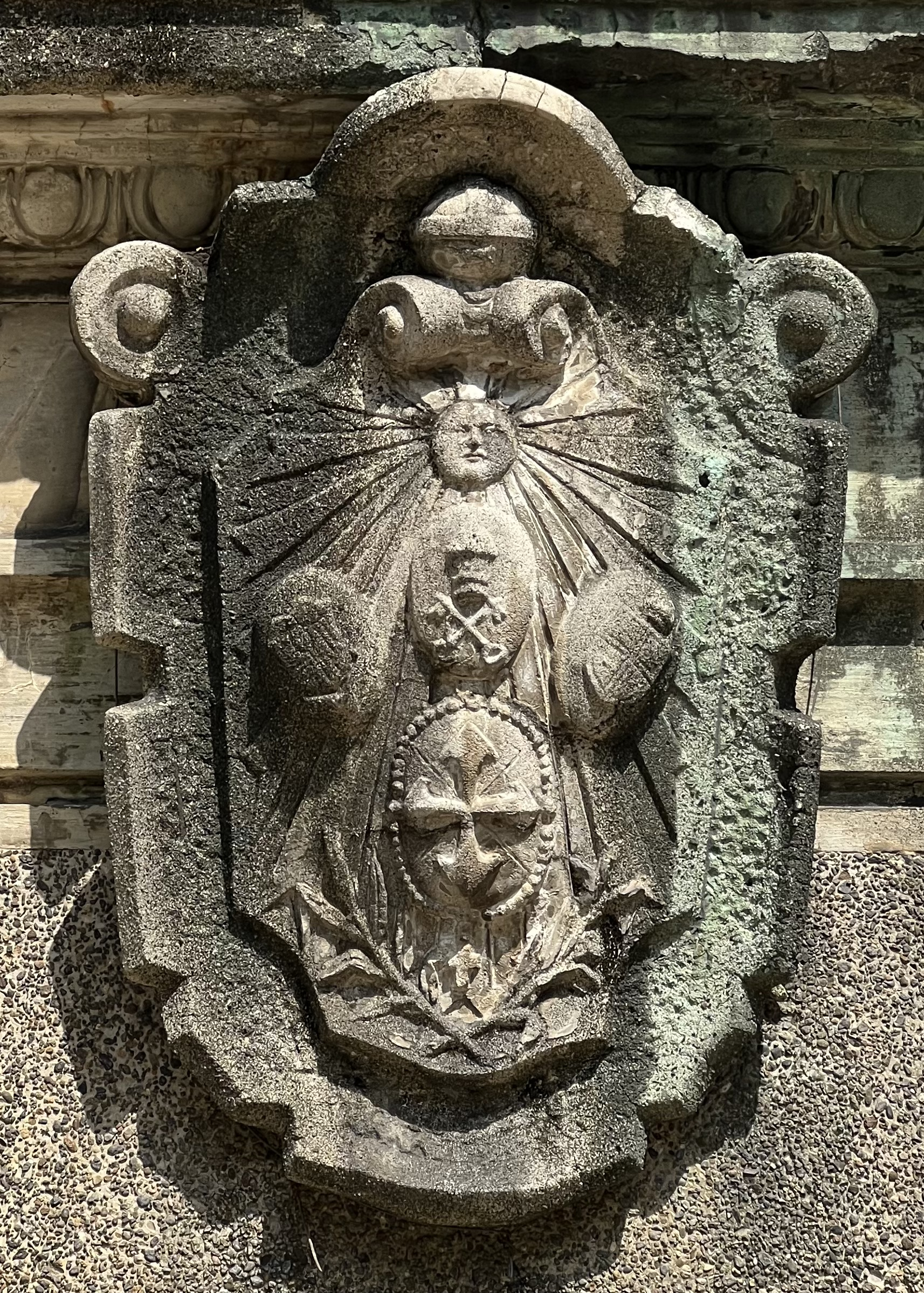
The old UST seal

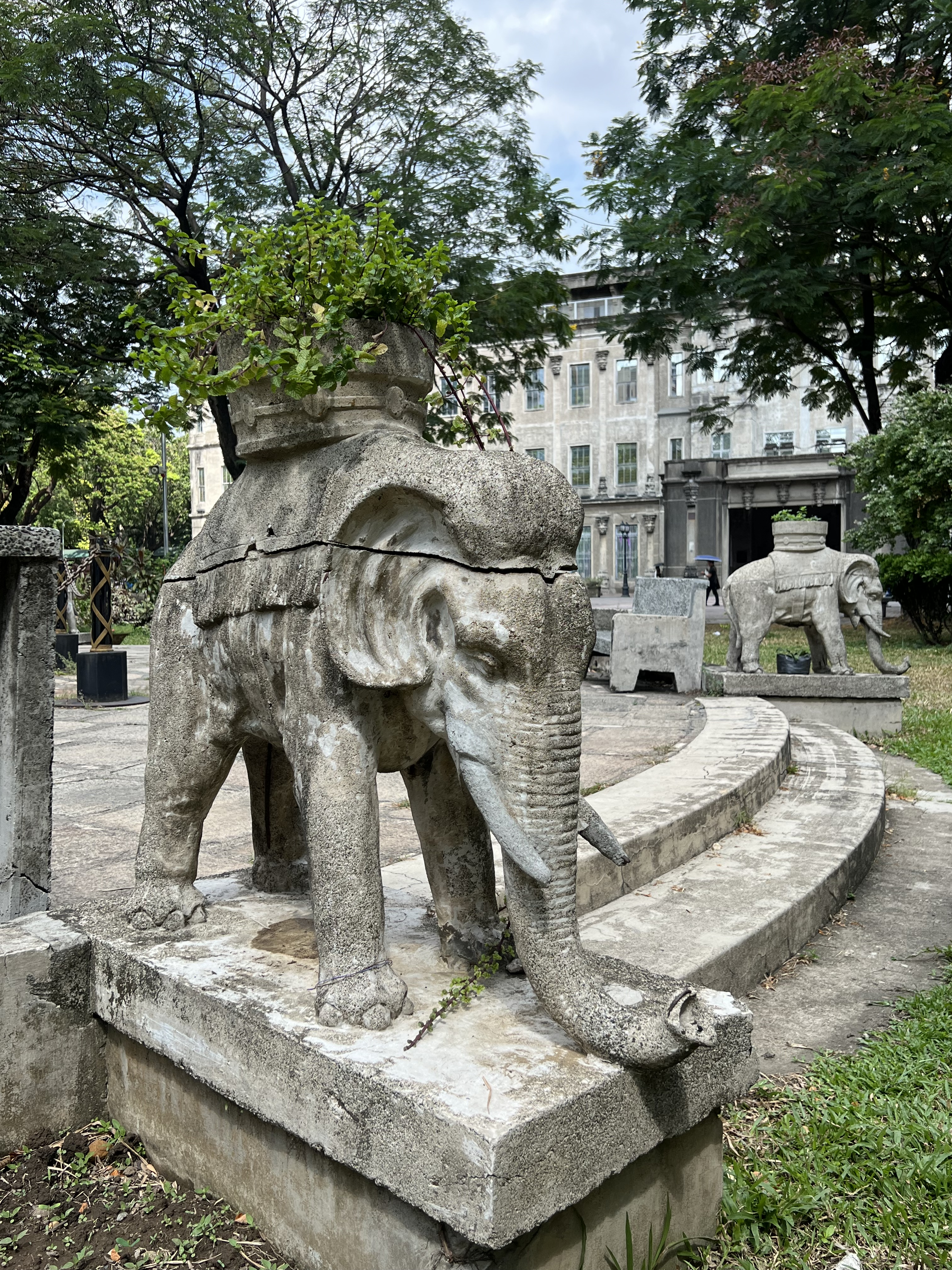
One of the eight elephants

== Plaza Santo Tomas (Present-day Intramuros) ==
Years after World War II, the original statue was transferred to the Sampaloc campus leaving the Plaza Santo Tomas in Intramuros an empty space. In the 1980s, the Intramuros Administration redeveloped the area into a usable park.

In 2002, the UST administration in cooperation with the Intramuros Administration, National Historical Institute, and the university alumni renovated the park. Manuel Cueto of the UST College of Architecture designed the renovation. The renovation project began in March 2001. Only the fences were retained from the original design of the plaza, which were based on a 1936 Unitas.

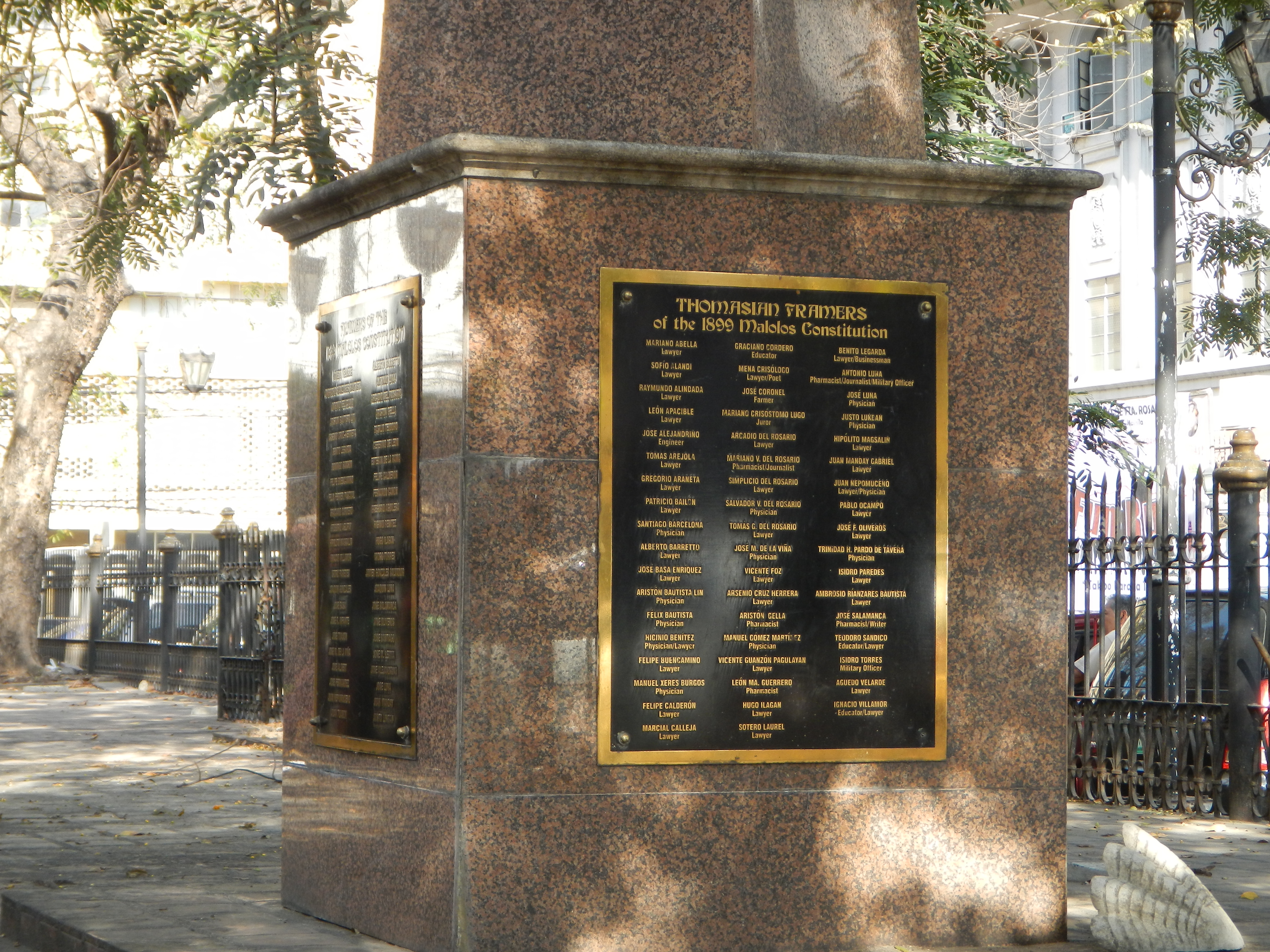
A marker in the obelisk containing the 53 Thomasian alumni of the Malolos Constitution

As part of the preparations for the Quadricentennial Celebration, a fiberglass replica of the statue was erected in its original location. The statue was sculpted by Dr. Crispin Viocencion and was inaugurated on January 25, 2002.

Beside the Benavides statue is an obelisk containing the names of all the framers of the Malolos Constitution. A plaque on the base of the obelisk mentions the 53 names of the Thomasians who became part of the 1899 Malolos Constitution. However, based on historical documents, 54 Thomasians, who were also members of the Malolos Congress, signed the 1899 Constitution.

An octagonal concrete marker was also added. Each side of the marker contains pictures of the original campus and the plaza.

== Statue in Spain ==
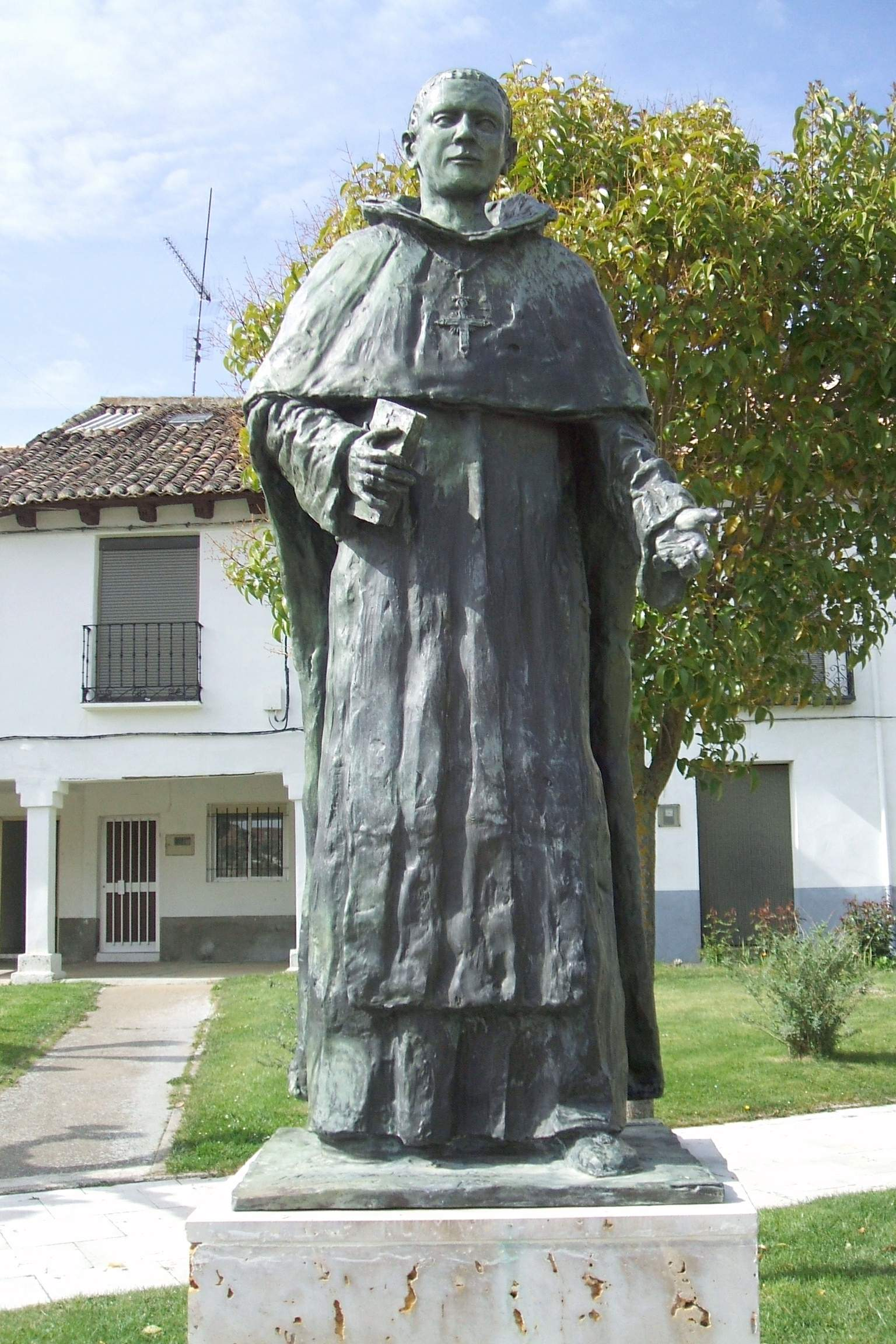
Benavides Statue in Carrion de los Condes, Spain

A statue of Benavides was unveiled in his hometown in Carrión de los Condes, Spain, on July 1, 2006. The bronze statue was made by Carlos Diez Galán. An inscription in the base of the statue reads, Miguel de Benavides, Carrión de los Condes. Primavera, 2006. Galán. In a bronze plaque in the front of the pedestal reads, Fr. Miguel de Benavides, OP. 1552 - 1605. Santo Misionero Prov. Ntra Sra Del Rosario. Arzobispo y fundador de la Universidad de Santo Tomas de Manila.

As part of the UST Quadricentennial Celebration in 2011, a mass at the Iglesia de San Andres and a wreath-laying ceremony at the statue were held. It was followed by the inauguration of a library named after Miguel de Benavides in the same town.

== Depictions ==
Depictions of the monument have been used by the university in various occasions.

- Benavides Outstanding Achievement Award medal
- Logo of the Simbahayan project of the UST Office of Community Development
- 2019-2020 car sticker
- UST Quadricentennial commemorative coins, stamps, and official first day cover in 2011
- UST Graduate School 50th Anniversary stamp in 1998
