= UST Plaza Benavides =

Park in Manila, Philippines

Coordinates: 14°36′33″N 120°59′25″E

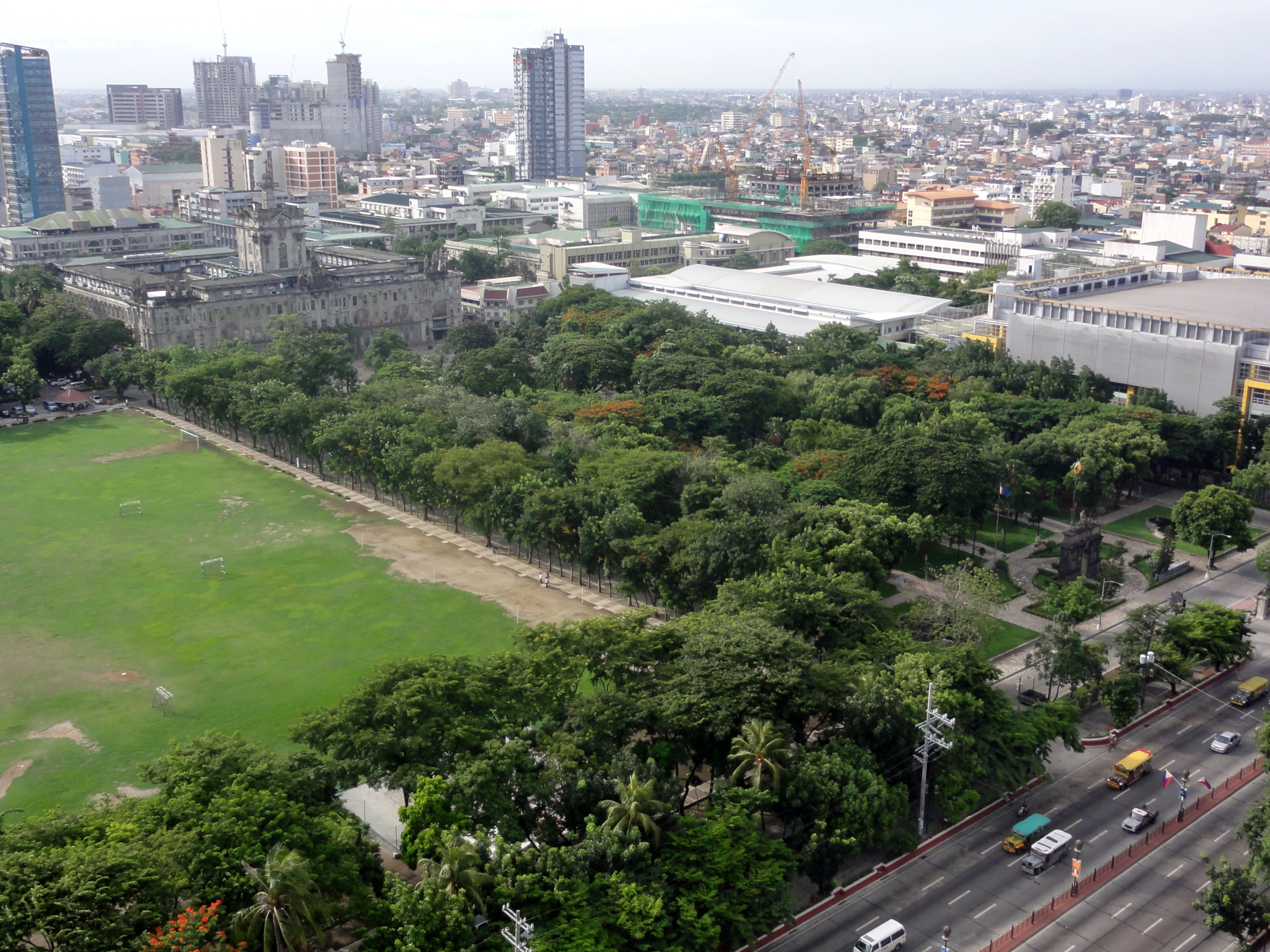
The canopies of trees at the Plaza Benavides

The Plaza Benavides, also known as Benavides Park or Benavides Garden in Manila, Philippines is a landscaped park located in the University of Santo Tomas. It contains the Benavides Monument, built to commemorate the founder of the university, Miguel de Benavides.

== History ==
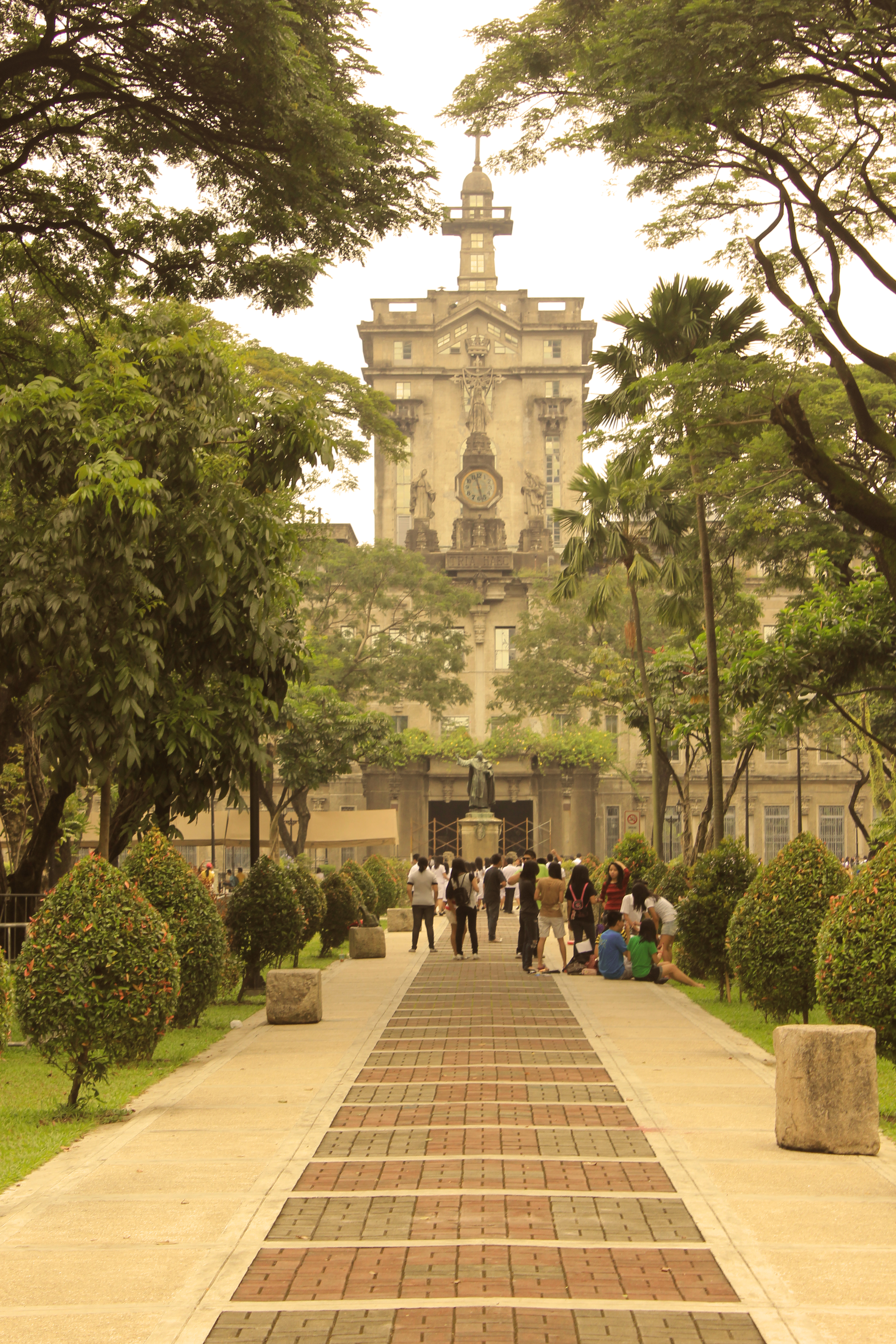
The view of the UST Main Building from the Lover's Lane

Prior to the park, the area served as a temporary burial site of the Santo Tomas Internment Camp during the World War II.

== Park layout ==
The Chinese tombstone

The Plaza Benavides, the largest park in the Manila campus, is bounded to the northwest by the Plaza Mayor, to the southwest by Osmeña Drive, to the northeast by the Quezon Drive, and to the southeast by the Plaza Intramuros. The center walkway is called the Rizal Lane, more popularly known as the Lover's Lane. Parallel to Rizal Lane is Burgos Lane on the left and M.H. Del Pilar Lane on the right. The three lanes were named in 1960 after UST alumni José Burgos, José Rizal, and Marcelo H. del Pilar. They begin at the Plaza Mayor and end at the Plaza Intramuros. The lanes have alternating terracotta, gray, and white colored cobblestones arranged in an interplay of squares and vertical lines.

The plaza underwent an extensive renovation for the quadricentennial celebration, but the Benavides Monument's raised circular base and the path that contained the Chinese tombstone were left relatively unaltered.

At the middle entrance of the Plaza Benavides from Plaza Mayor lies a Chinese tombstone. The tombstone, which dates back to 1818, measures 67 cm x 130 cm. It reads:

甫山
嘉慶歲次戊寅年桐月吉旦
顯妣甲必丹娘微沓吳氏之城
孝男...
同立
孝女...

Fushan (village of origin)
Jiaqing wuyin by an auspicious day of the 3rd month
Tomb of our beloved mother Vita, wife of capitan Uy
Erected by her five filial sons and five daughters...

The Benavides Monument serves as the park's main attraction. The statue of Miguel de Benavides was transferred from Intramuros in 1946.

== Botany ==
The Benavides Park comprises at least 60 different types of trees. The Rizal Lane is lined by rows of tall pruned Photinia × fraseri or Red Robins. It's also surrounded with native trees and exotic trees like rubber fig and mahogany. In 2026, the College of Science marked its centenary with a tree-planting activity at the plaza. Among the native trees planted were the Mindanao rainbow gum and the Philippine teak. The list of trees in the plaza include:

- Brassaia actinophylla Endl. (Octopus tree)
- Cassia fistula (Tropical golden shower)
- Cinnamomum camphora (L.) J. Presl. (Camphor)
- Cinnamomum camphora T Nees. (Camphor)
- Delonix regia (Bojer) (Fire tree)
- Diospyros philippensis (Rolfe) (Kamagong)
- Eucalyptus deglupta (Mindanao rainbow gum)
- Livistona rotundifolia (Lam) Mart. var. luzonensis Becc. (Anahaw)
- Peltophorum pterocarpum (DC.) K.Heyne (Siar tree)
- Pterocarpus indicus Willd. (Narra)
- Samanea saman (Jacq.) Merr. (Acacia)
- Spathodea campanulata P.Beauv. (African tulip tree)
- Tectona philippinensis (Philippine teak)

== Usage ==
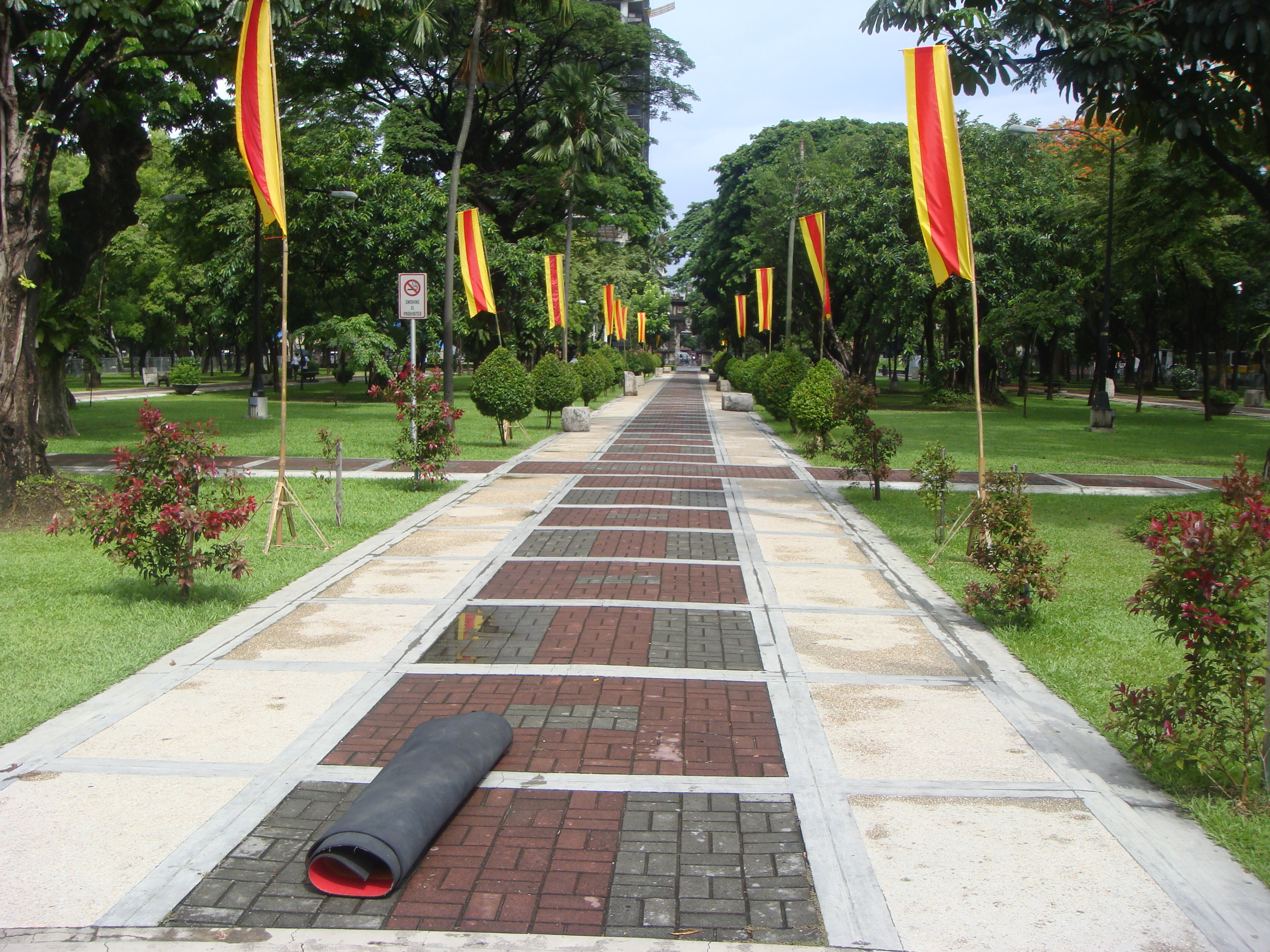
The Rizal Lane during the visit of Queen Sofía of Spain in 2012.

The annual UST Inter-School On-the-Spot Painting Competition is usually held in the plaza.

When Queen Sofía of Spain visited UST in 2012, she was welcomed by the university rector at Rizal Lane before laying a wreath at the Benavides Statue.

In 2015, Pope Francis entered the UST campus through the Arch of the Centuries. He then went to an open-top vehicle for a motorcade which began at Rizal Lane, passing through the Benavides Monument and Plaza Mayor.

In 2016 and 2025, the opening ceremonies of the UAAP Season 79 and 88 were held at the UST campus. Student-athletes from the 8 participating schools passed through the Arch of the Centuries and Rizal Lane in a parade leading to the Plaza Mayor.
