= UST Plaza Mayor =

Plaza in Manila, Philippines

Coordinates: 14.6098°N 120.9896°E

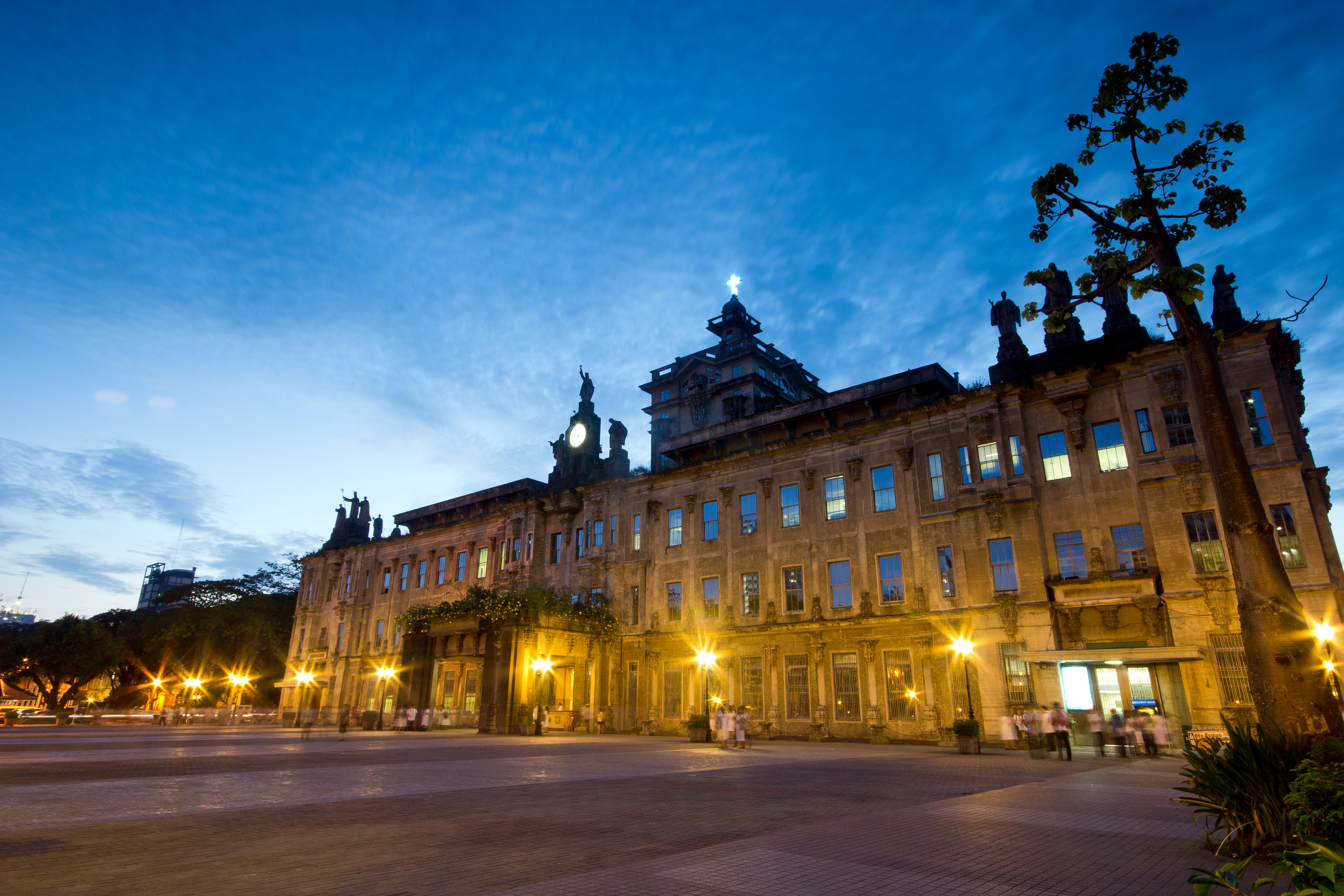
The Plaza Mayor in front of the UST Main Building

The UST Plaza Mayor in Manila, Philippines is a large plaza located in the center of the University of Santo Tomas.

== History ==
The Plaza Mayor was the location where the Americans declared the liberation of the Santo Tomas internees in 1945.

Prior to the existence of the plaza, the front yard of the UST Main Building served as a parking area and pedestrian. A small street called Benavides Drive traversed the area to connect the Quezon Drive and the Osmeña Drive. As part of the university's preparation for the Quadricentennial Celebration, the area was refurbished to enhance the structural magnificence of the Main Building.

== Features ==
The plaza has a rectangular plan divided into 13 vertical segments of alternating terracotta and gray-colored tiles. Fourteen twin-head Victorian lamp posts line the 2 ends of the quadrangle. The plaza is contiguous with the Plaza Benavides by the M.H. Del Pilar Lane, the Burgos Lane, and the Chinese tombstone.

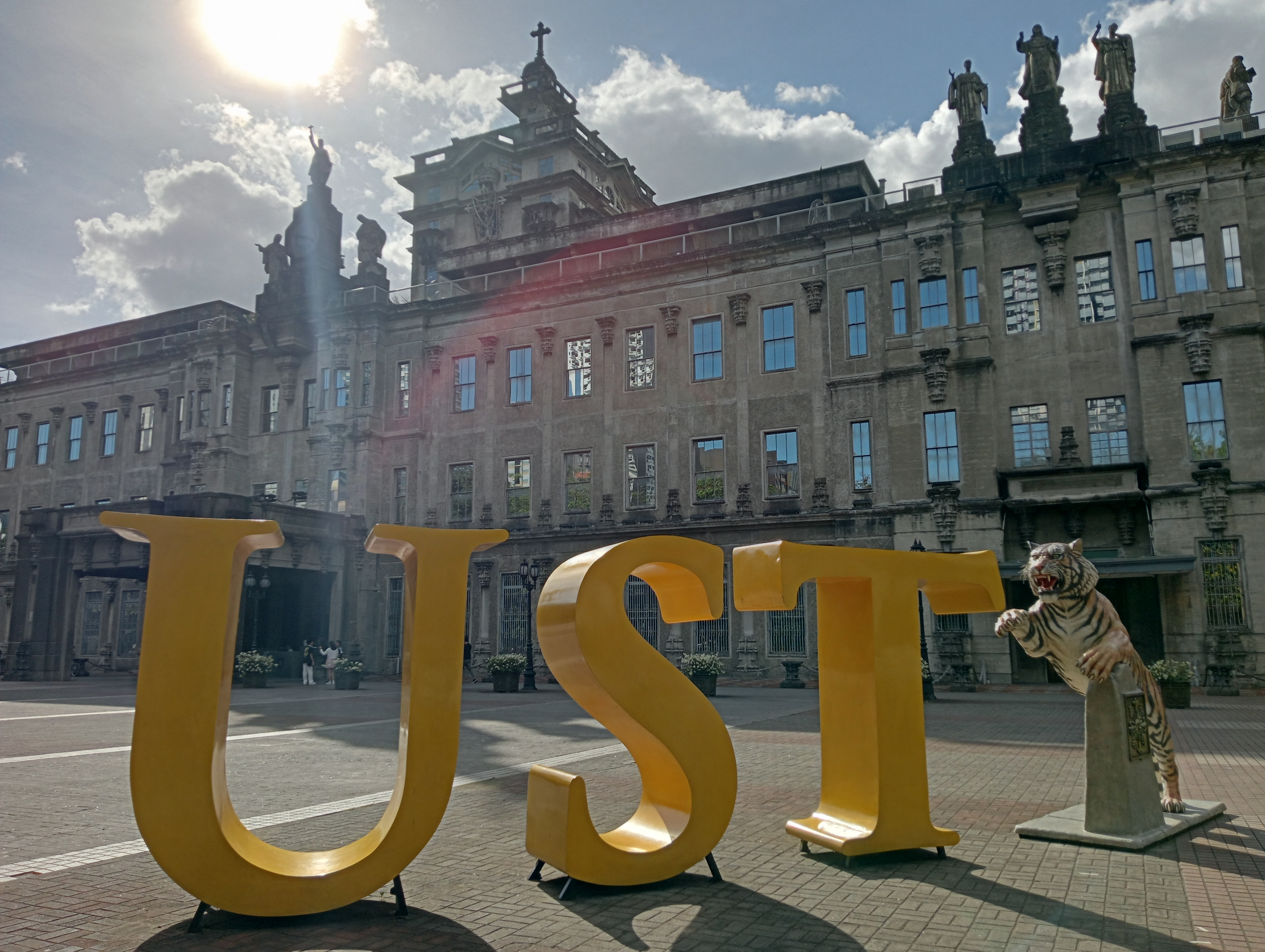
The new UST block letters and Bengal Tiger statue in 2024.

On the southeast flank of the quadrangle, stand a statue of a tiger and the UST block letters. The current tiger statue, unveiled in August 2022, is about 8 feet long.
