= Awards and prizes of the University of Santo Tomas =

List of awards and prizes

The University of Santo Tomas is a private Catholic research university in Manila, Philippines. Founded in 1611 by the Order of Preachers, it is the oldest university in the Philippines and Asia. The university gives numerous awards, honors, prizes, and recognitions to its people and the general public who have substantial accomplishments or have exemplified the ideals of UST.

== List of awards ==
- The Outstanding Thomasian Alumni Awards (a.k.a. TOTAL) — the highest set of awards given to Thomasian alumni in recognition of their significant contributions to the University, country, and the faith
- Dangal ng UST Awards (Honor of UST Awards) — set of awards given to faculty members who excelled in their respective fields
- Hiyas ng UST Awards (Gem of UST Awards) — set of awards given to the university support staff
- Gawad Ustetika (Grant Ustetika) — recognizes the works of aspiring Thomasian student and alumni writers. Ustetika is portmanteau of the words “USTé”, colloquial name of the university, and “estetika” (aesthetics). Some of the categories are as follows.
  - Parangal Hagbong (Award Laureate)— awarded to UST alumni for lifetime achievement in letters Hagbong is from an old Tagalog word meaning laureate.
  - Rector’s Literary Award — awarded for literary works that best reflect the Catholic vision
- USTv Awards — awarded to television shows and personalities who convey responsible television content

== Student awards ==
The university recognizes academic achievers, student leaders, and organizations annually on UST Student Awards Day. Medals and certificates are awarded to students under the following categories:

- Rector’s Academic Medal — medal awarded to students who obtained the highest scholastic rating for whole academic unit
- Pope Leo XIII Award — medal awarded for active involvement in community development with partner communities or sectoral groups
- Quezon Award — medal awarded for exceptional student government and socio-civic leadership
- Benavides Award — medal awarded for outstanding achievement in academic or scientific field through winning in international and national competitions, conferences or congresses
- Pope Saint John Paul II Award — medal awarded for outstanding achievement in sports and arts
- Santo Domingo de Guzman Award — awarded for outstanding teamwork for student organizations
- Albertus Magnus Award — awarded for outstanding research work
- St. Thomas Aquinas Award — awarded for exceptionally outstanding performance
- Tradition of Excellence Award — awarded for exemplary performance of a student organization on a sustained level by having been granted the same award for five consecutive years
