= UST Quadricentennial Celebration =

Quadricentennial celebration

The Pontifical and Royal University of Santo Tomas (UST) Quadricentennial Celebration took place from December 18, 2009 to January 27, 2012. The agenda before the quadricentennial year in 2011 included the introduction of new academic programs, improvements in the university's infrastructure, and other projects to raise UST's national and international prominence and promote its role as a social catalyst.

== Summary ==
Plans to open satellite campuses in Santa Rosa, Laguna, and General Santos are being put in place.

Physical developments for the Sampaloc campus are ongoing. The Plaza Mayor in front the Main Building, the Quadricentennial Square which will feature the Tetraglobal sculpture, the Quadricentennial Fountain, and the Quadricentennial Alumni Walkway were constructed in 2006. To accommodate the needs of extra space for the growing number of student activities, the UST Tan Yan Kee Student Center was built in front of the Miguel de Benavides Library. The more than 80-year-old Main Building, and the artifacts and art works in the UST Museum of Arts and Sciences, were placed under the preservation of the UST Heritage Conservation program in December 2008.

The UST Benavides Cancer Institute, part of the five-year redevelopment plan and expansion of the UST Hospital for its 60-year celebration and the quadricentennial celebration, was established in 2006.

Part of the university's infrastructure modernization is the construction of an P800-million, four-storey gymnasium capable of seating 5,792, designed by Thomasian architects José Pedro Recio and Carmelo T. Casas. University officials, led by rector Rolando V. de la Rosa, led its groundbreaking ceremonies in August 2008.

The UST Publishing House in 2001 launched its quadricentennial project, "400 Books at 400!", publishing books in a range of disciplines, from theology to literature to medicine, written in both Filipino and English.

== Quadricentennial Commission ==
A Quadricentennial Commission was created to formulate preparations for the celebration of the UST Quadricentennial Jubilee. The commission is chaired by the UST rector, Rolando V. de la Rosa. The following are its members:

- Chairman (Rector)
- Vice Chairman (Vice Rector)
- Secretary (Assistant to the Rector for Administration)
- Committees
  1. Quadricentennial Committee (Assistant to the Rector for Grants and Endowment)
  2. Major Infrastructure Projects Committee (Facilities Management Office Director)
  3. External Relations Committee (Office of the Alumni Affairs)
  4. Grand Celebrations Committee (Secretary General)
  5. Documentation and Publication Committee (Office for Public Affairs / Executive Secretary of the Rector)
  6. Media and Publicity Committee (Office for Public Affairs / EdTech).

== Symbolization ==
The Tongues of Fire, the official Quadricentennial logo

=== Logo ===
The Tongues of Fire is the official logo for the quadricentennial celebration. It features the outline of the UST Main Building Tower as a concrete symbol of the stability, integrity and 400 years of existence of the university. From the cross of the Main Building emanate four tongues of fire that spell out U, S, and T. The tongues of fire reference the future of the university and some ideals, and are reminiscent of the stripes of the Tiger, the school's mascot. The quadricentennial logo was designed by Dopy Doplon, a Thomasian.

=== Song ===
"Ako'y Isang Tomasino" (I am a Thomasian), composed by UST Faculty of Engineering alumnus Gerry de Leon, is the official theme song of the celebration. It bested four other finalists in the Q Songwriting Contest Grand Finals held the previous December at the Albertus Magnus Auditorium. It was performed by Sam Velarde, a friend of de Leon, from other university. The song was launched during the “400 days to 400 years Countdown” on December 18 at the UST football field.

=== Prayer ===
The quadricentennial prayer was unveiled to the public during the “400 days to 400 years Countdown” on Dec. 18. It was recited by Pompeyo de Mesa with a candle-lighting ceremony.

=== Flag ===
The quadricentennial flag consists of two horizontal stripes of equal width, the upper one gold and the lower one white. These are defined as school colors of the university because of its Pontifical status. Embroidered with "2011", the flag features the sun and the colors yellow and blue, taken from the logo of the university.

=== Countdown Clock ===
The countdown clock, which is a Swatch Beatman, is produced by Swiss watch company Swatch. It is designed by former Varsitarian art director Jonathan Gamalinda.

=== Mascot ===
The mascot is named "QUSTER", which stands for Quadricentennial University of Santo Tomas Tiger.

== Infrastructure ==
=== University Marker ===
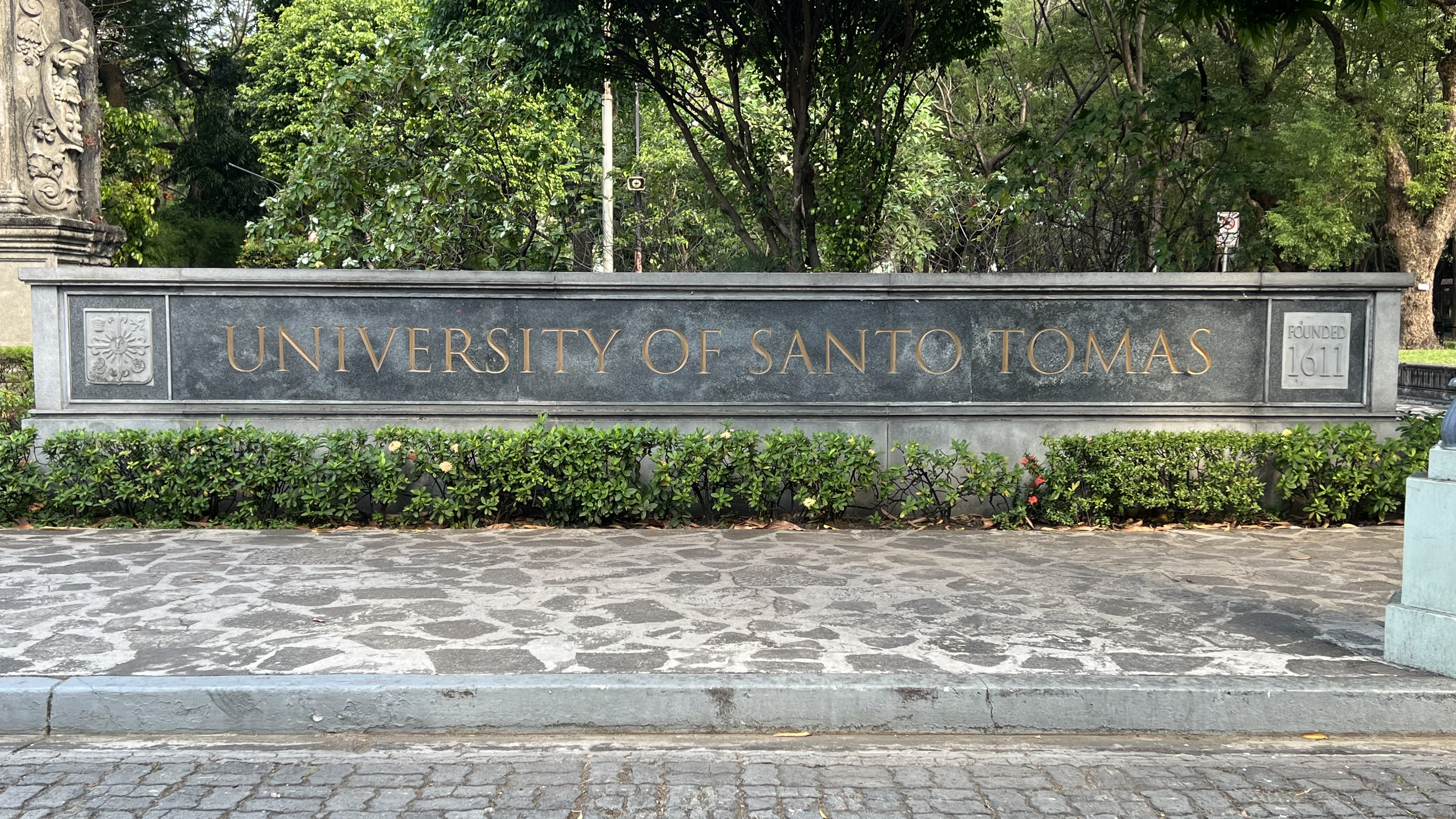
The marker as seen from Plaza Intramuros Drive.

A one-foot-by-three-feet marble marker in Plaza Intramuros near the main vehicular entrance of the campus was unveiled on February 4, 2010. It was designed by architect John Joseph T. Fernandez, Dean of the College of Architecture, and architect Froilan M. Fontecha, faculty member of the same college. It bears the name of the university, its seal on the left, and the year 1611 on the right.

=== Quadricentennial Square ===
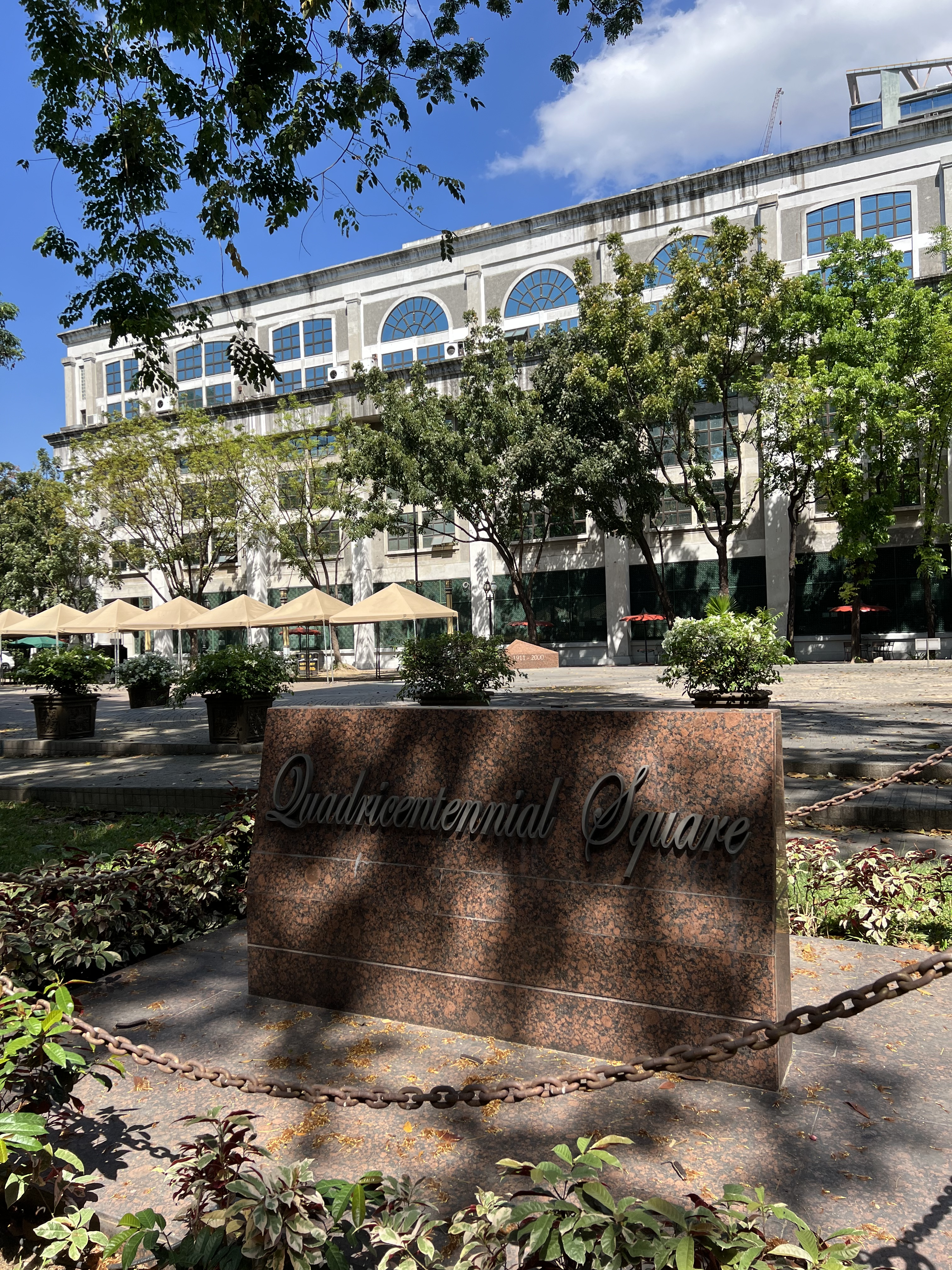
The park's marker as seen from Ampuero Drive.

Replacing the old Colayco Park and its adjacent UST Cooperative Center, the Quadricentennial Square was built as a memorial of the university's four centuries of existence. It has two main features: the Quadricentennial Fountain and the Quattromondial Monument. It is located between the Main Building and the Miguel de Benavides Library.

The Colayco Shrine, an iron statue commemorating the World War 2 victim Capt. Manuel Colayco, was nowhere to be found since its removal from the site in 2006.

==== Fountain ====
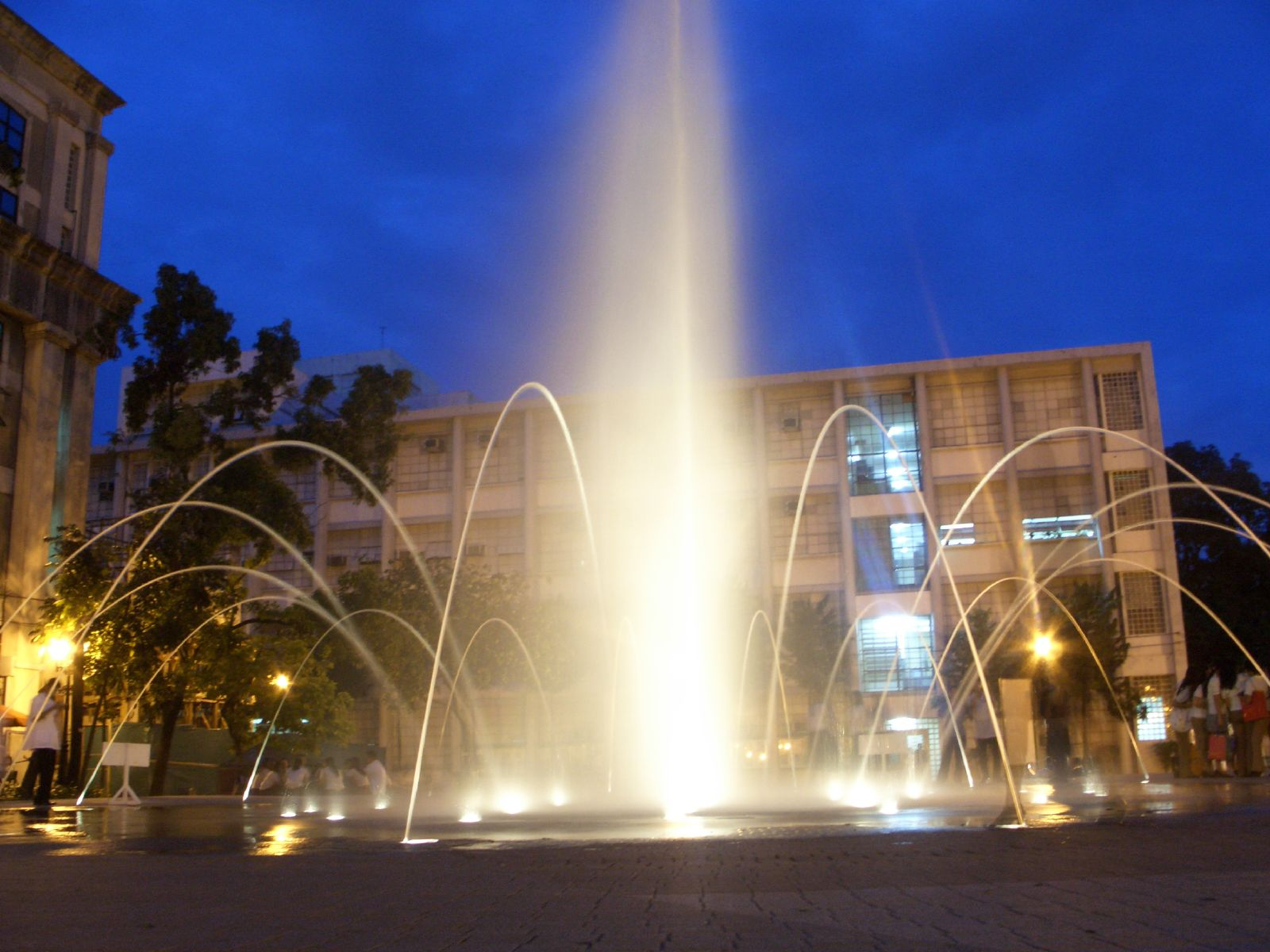
UST Quadricentennial Fountain

This recreational and interactive fountain was unveiled in 2007. It was designed and built by Industron Inc., the same designer of Cultural Center of the Philippines and Liwasang Bonifacio fountains in Manila.

The fountain has sun-like floor patterns to pay tribute to the university's patron saint, Thomas Aquinas. Its four cornerstones highlight UST milestones during its first four centuries.

According to UST Facilities Management Office administrator Antonio Espejo, the fountain uses recycled water treated with chlorine. It runs three times a day (6AM to 8AM, 11AM to 1PM, and 5PM to 8PM).

There is a superstition that to counter the effect of passing through the Arch of the Centuries while studying in the university, a student must take a shower in the fountain, as this will cleanse him and prevent the happening of an event that will bar the student from graduating.

==== Quattromondial Monument ====
Unveiled on January 27, 2011, this is a ten-meter-high structure of bronze and glass made by artist Ramon Orlina, a UST alumnus.

The monument features four figures, which, according to Orlina, represent the school's four centuries:

- The young Filipino student represents excellence, and was modeled after actor Piolo Pascual.
- The young Filipina student represents tradition, and was modeled after Orlina's daughter Monina.
- The Thomasian teacher represents erudition, and was modeled after beauty queen Charlene Gonzales.
- The Dominican friar-scholar represents spirituality, and was modeled after university rector Rolando de la Rosa.

Upon the four near-naked figures, whose genitals are covered by a long strip of ribbon, rests a globe; and like the earth, it tilts 23.5 degrees. The globe represents globalization, with all its benefits and hindrances, such as environmental degradation and cultural divisions. The ribbon streams out of the globe, printed with an inscription in Latin signifying accomplishment, scholarliness and wisdom. It reads:

Pontificia et Regalis Universitas Sancti Thomae Aquinatis Manilana MDCXI. Contemplari et Contemplata aliis Tradere. In Veritate fideles. In Labore proficientes. In Caritate divites.

=== Martyrs' Monument Park and Rosarium Garden ===
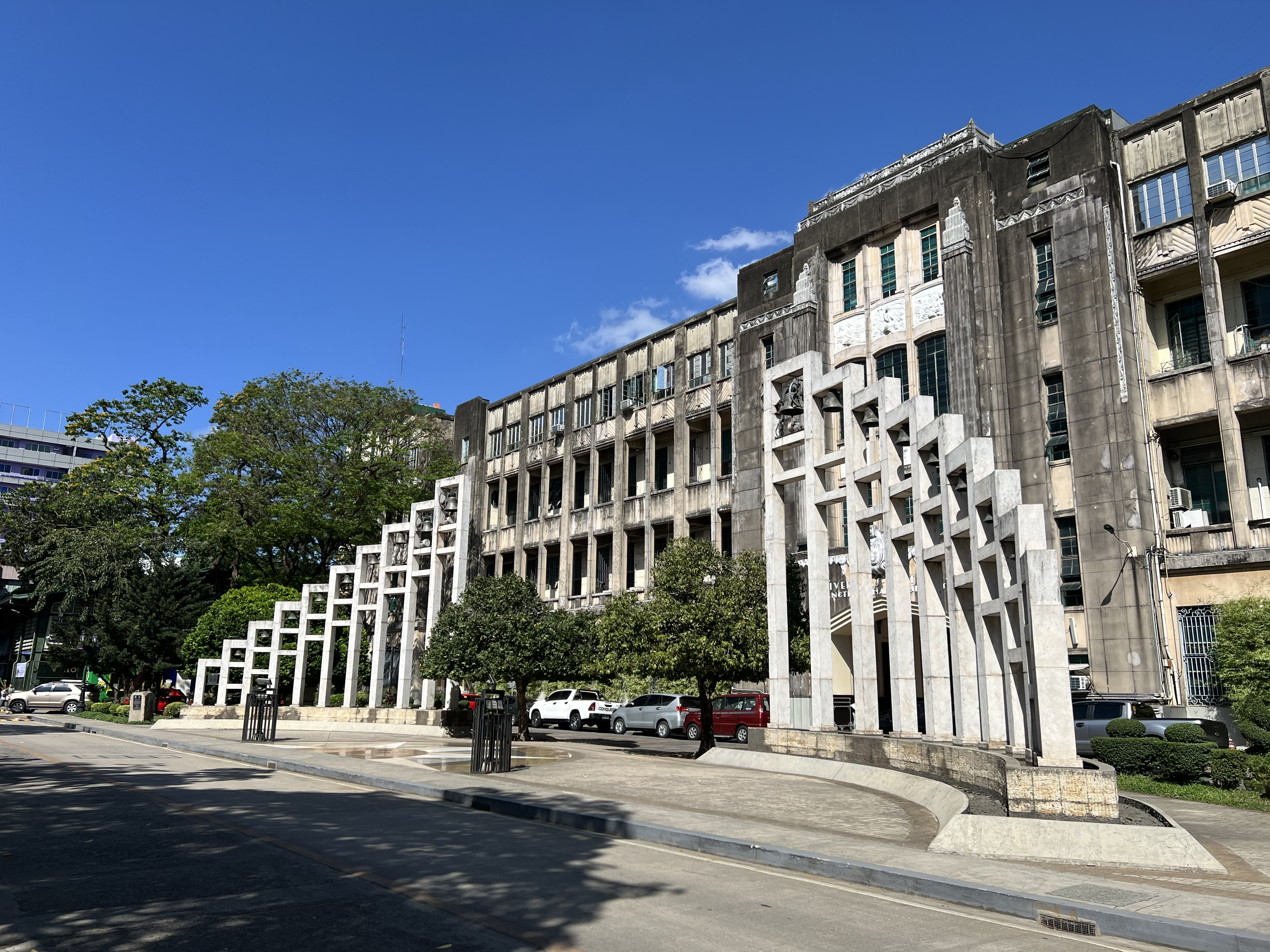
The Martyrs' Monument Park

During the Quadricentennial celebrations, the University introduced new structures within the campus. On November 22, 2011, the University dedicated the Martyrs' Monument Park, located in front of the Santisimo Rosario Parish. These monuments take the form of Carillon bells with each bell dedicated to the Thomasian Martyrs. The bells ring every half an hour (in the tune of Westminster chime, with a particular tune and continuous ringing at 12:00 nn and 6:00 pm, which signals the entire Thomasian Community to pause and pray the Angelus (Regina caeli during the Easter Season). The bells were also used on significant occasions, such as the UST Christmas Concert in 2011, when Conservatory of Music Dean Raul Sunico played Christmas carols through a keyboard, and during the closing of the Quadricentennial Celebrations in January 2012.

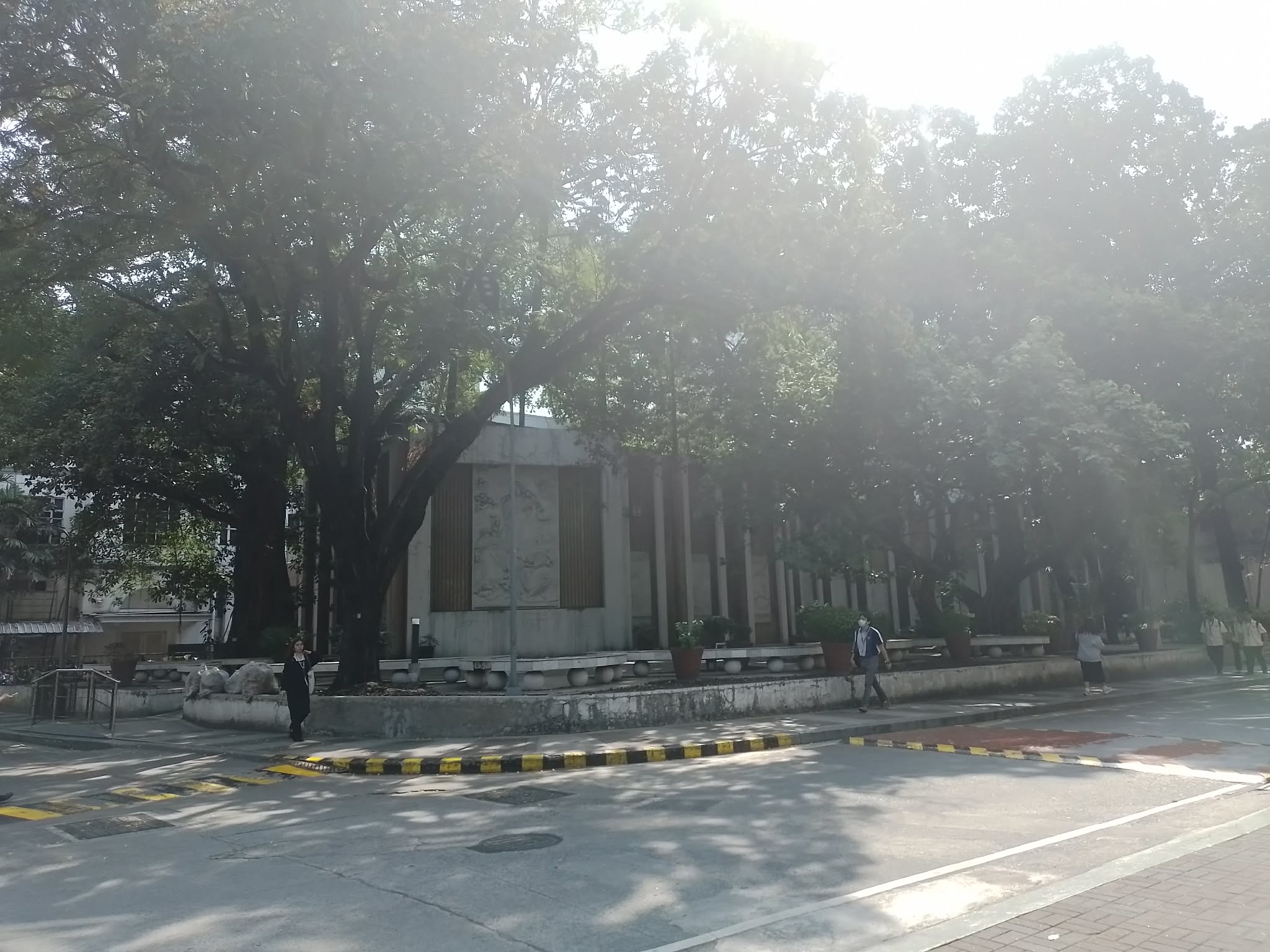
Rosarium Garden

Meanwhile, the Rosarium garden replaced the Tinoko Park. The park features a rosary garden, with the Mysteries of the Rosary depicted on the walls. The park was blessed by Fr. de la Rosa on December 7, 2011, during the visit of the image of Our Lady of La Naval de Manila to UST.

=== Quadricentennial Pavilion ===
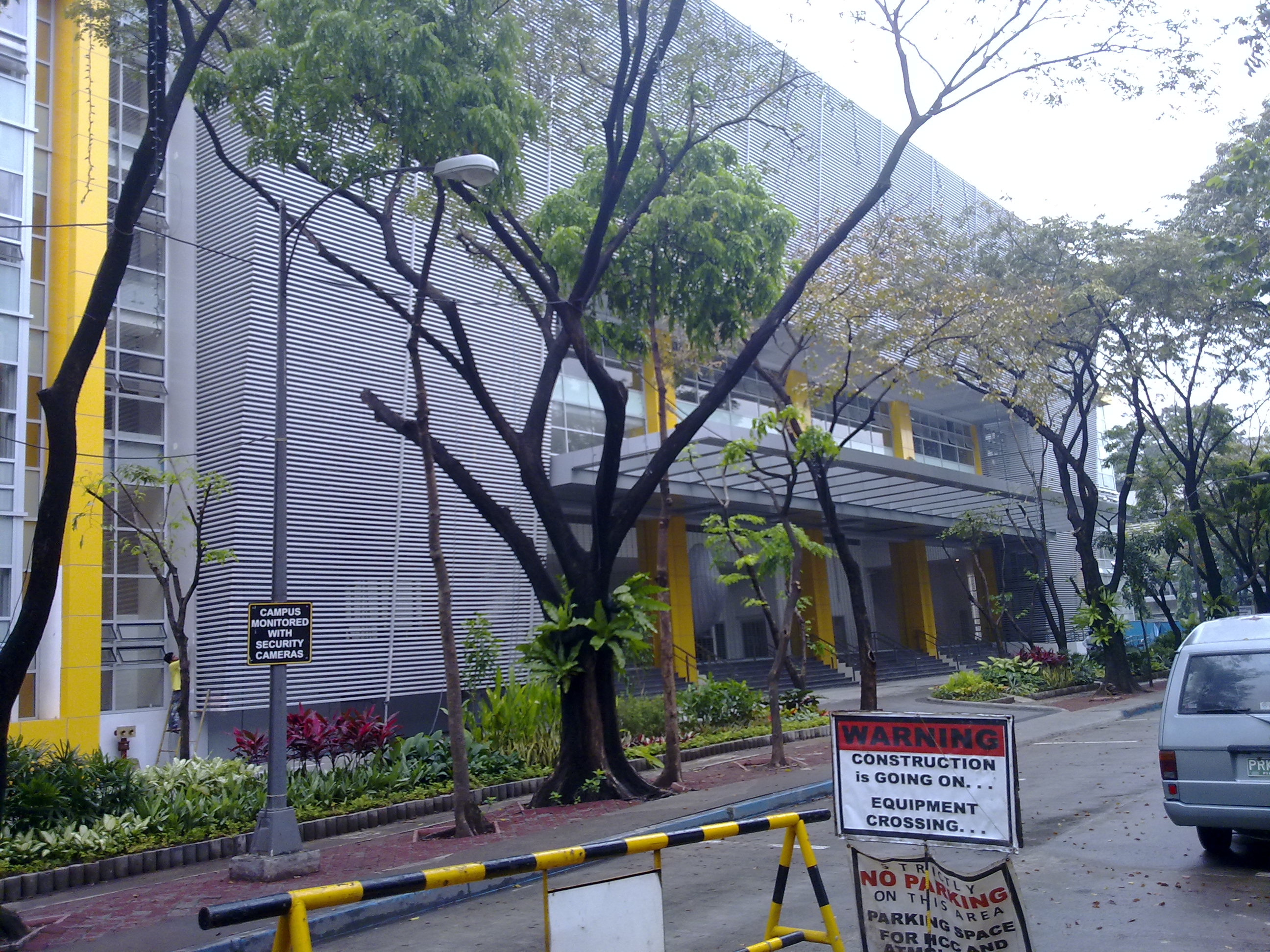
The Quadricentennial Pavilion

Replacing the original UST Gymnasium and the old Engineering Sports Complex, the construction of the 800-million-peso UST Sports Complex began after the Vatican gave its "blessing" to the project. It was to be inaugurated on August 15, 2011.

Officially named the Quadricentennial Pavilion, the sports complex was designed by Thomasian architects Jose Pedro Recio and Carmelo Casas. It stands on what used to be the Engineering Sports Complex, basketball courts, and the adjacent football field. It houses training areas for gymnastics, aerobics, taekwondo, judo, table tennis, fencing, and badminton at its ground floor. It features a ticket counter, a museum, a dance hall for the Salinggawi Dance Troupe, and a fitness room. Its main attraction is a basketball court surrounded by bleachers rising up to the fourth level.

=== Buenaventura Garcia Paredes, O.P. Building ===
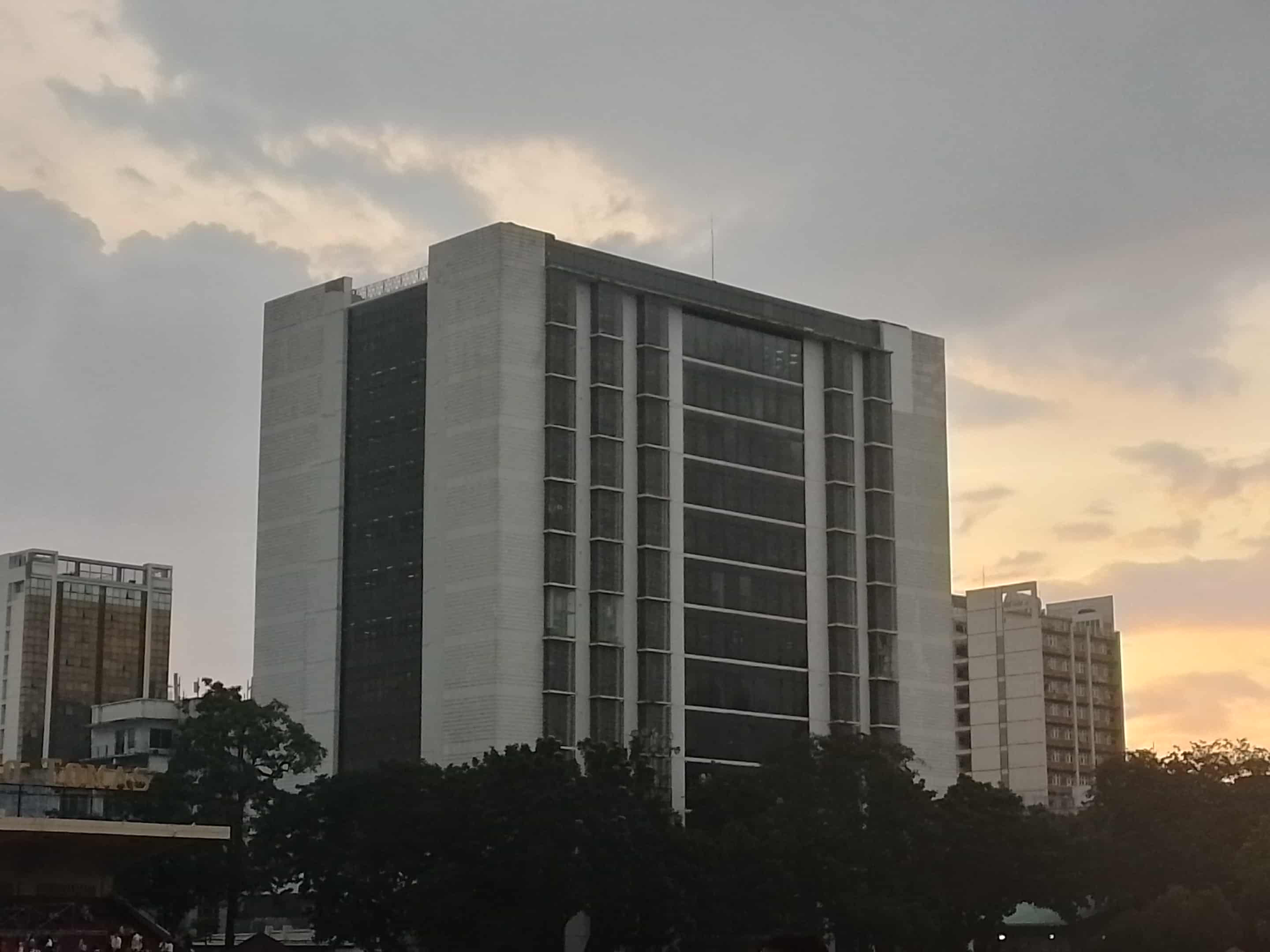
The Buenaventura Garcia Paredes O.P. Building

Built on the site of the original UST Gymnasium, the alumni center is used as a venue for alumni gatherings, various university events, and lodging services for visitors. It is according to the pursuit of the university's Office for Alumni Relations to build a center to cater to the growing number of UST Alumni. The existing Olympic-sized swimming pool located nearby were kept and refurbished. Initially planned as a 4-storey building projected to be completed and opened in 2012, it was raised to 12 storeys and was completed and opened in 2014.

Its design was chosen from seven winners in a competition among students organized by the College of Architecture. Abelardo Tolentino Jr., an outstanding Thomasian alumni from the College of Architecture, worked on the design to produce the final blueprint.

US-based Thomasian medical practitioners raised and donated US$1 million to assist the construction of the alumni center.

=== UST Hospital extension building ===
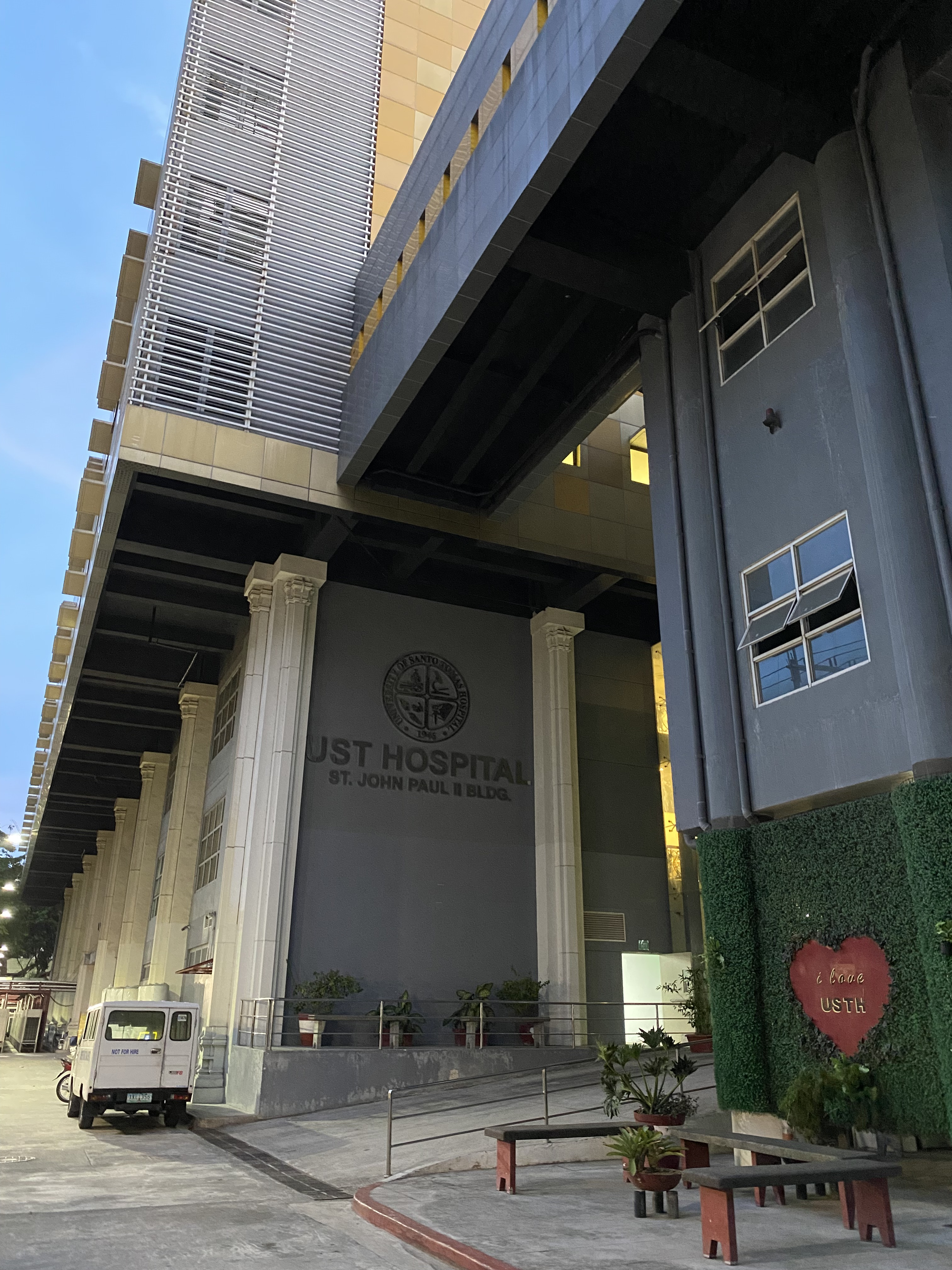
The UST Hospital Extension Building

The blessing of the construction site of the UST Hospital's extension building was held on January 23, 2012, the first day of the closing week of the Quadricentennial Celebrations. Once constructed, the services in the USTH Medical Arts building were transferred there. The medical arts building will then be demolished to give way to another construction of a new medical arts facility. This extension building was completed and opened in 2019.

=== University sites as National Cultural Treasures ===
Four structures within the university's campus were declared National Cultural Treasures by the National Museum. The declaration was made on January 25, 2010. These sites were:

- The Main Building (the first earthquake-resistant building in the Philippines)
- The Arch of the Centuries (the remnant of UST's original campus in Intramuros)
- The Central Seminary Building (the home of the oldest college of Ecclesiastical studies in the Philippines)
- The Field and Open Spaces (the venue where a mass celebrated by Pope John Paul II was held).

The Cultural Properties Preservation and Protection Act describes "National Cultural Treasures" as unique objects found in the Philippines that possess outstanding historical, cultural, artistic, and/or scientific value. These are considered as significant and important to the Philippines.

Another National Cultural Treasure that was recently awarded to the university were the UST Baybayin Documents which were created in the years 1613 (Document A) and in 1625 (Document B).

== Events ==
=== 4 horas, 4 dias, 4 hundred days, 400 years ===
The Quadricentennial countdown to 2011 coincided with UST's Christmas tradition, Paskuhan, held on December 18, 2009. The theme was called as such because the party lasted for 4 hours on December 18, which was 4 days before December 22, which was 400 days before January 28, 2011, which was the grand opening of UST's Quadricentennial celebrations. The official launch of the countdown was intended to be held on December 22, but the university was expected to be already on its Christmas vacation during that day.

January 28 is the feast day of St. Thomas Aquinas, the patron saint of the university, after which it was named. UST was founded on April 28, 1611.

The Paskuhan festivities and the Quadricentennial countdown were hosted by UST alumni - beauty queen Miriam Quiambao and TV personality Kim Atienza.

=== Simbahayan 400 ===
"Tomasino para sa Simbahan at Bayan" (Thomasians for the Church and the Country) is a socio-civic activity that began in January 2010. The Quadricentennial's "centerpiece project", according to Fr. de La Rosa, aims for UST to adopt some 400 villages with the help of non-governmental organization Gawad Kalinga.

=== Thomasian Global Trade Expo ===
It was a three-day exposition of businesses owned and managed by Thomasian students or alumni. It was held at the SMX Convention Center in the Mall of Asia Complex in Pasay. Begun on October 15, 2010, the expo featured a job fair; shopping bazaars; wellness festival; arts, design, and construction booths; celebrity shows; food and beverage stalls; entrepreneur workshops; and advocacy seminars. Jollibee Foods Corp.'s Tony Tan Caktiong, Mercury Drug's Viviene Que-Ascona, and Joel Cruz of Aficionado were among the Thomasian businessmen who joined.

The expo was a joint project of UST Alumni Association, UST Office for Alumni Affairs, and the UST Thomasian Alumni Leaders Association.

Some of the proceeds of this event were used to fund the construction of the Thomasian Alumni Center.

=== Lumina Pandit ===
UST's rare book collections and historic documents were shown to the public through an exhibition in Miguel de Benavides Library. Lumina Pandit is Latin for "spreading the light." The exhibit showcased Doctrina Christiana, the first book published in the Philippines, a rare copy of Copernicus' book, and academic records of UST alumni, such as those of national heroes José Rizal and Apolinario Mabini, four Philippine presidents, and six Supreme Court chief justices.

=== Quadricentennial Rosary (December 8, 2010) ===
The University celebrated the Solemnity of the Immaculate Conception by forming a human rosary around the university campus. Around 24,000 members of the Thomasian community, composed of students, faculty members, support staff, academic and administrative officials, participated. A Solemn Eucharistic Celebration took place at the Plaza Mayor after the praying of the Rosary. The Mass was presided by Very Rev. Fr. Quirico T. Pedregosa Jr., OP, Prior Provincial of the Dominican Province of the Philippines, which at that time celebrated the 39th founding anniversary of the Dominican Province of the Philippines.

The event was an attempt to enter the Guinness World Records for the largest human rosary, but because of processing time and verification standards set by the record organization (Guinness), the University no longer applied for the said record. These standards were considered when the University attempted to form the World's Largest Human Cross in March 2011.

=== Quadricentennial Week (January 24-28, 2011) ===
==== Opening of the Jubilee Year (January 24, 2011) ====
Pope Benedict XVI, through the Apostolic Penitentiary, declared a Jubilee Year for the University of Santo Tomas from January 24, 2011 to January 27, 2012, in response to a request from the University. A Jubilee Door was opened at Santisimo Rosario Parish on January 24, 2011, by His Eminence, Cardinal Gaudencio Rosales, Archbishop of Manila, who also celebrated the Eucharist and imparted an Apostolic Blessing, carrying with it a plenary indulgence.

==== Awarding of winners of the Q Short Film Festival (January 25, 2011) ====
Organized by the Office for Quadricentennial Activities and Highlights, Central Student Council and local councils, the festival has the theme, “Ano’ng kuwentong UST mo? (What’s your UST tale?).” Student filmmakers from the Faculties of Arts and Letters, Pharmacy, and Medicine and Surgery, as well as from the Colleges of Nursing, Architecture, Fine Arts and Design, Commerce, Rehabilitation Sciences, Education, and Science participated in the film fest. There were also participants from the Conservatory of Music and the two High Schools.

==== Opening of the 10th ICUSTA (January 26, 2011) ====
On January 26, 2011, the International Council of the Universities of St. Thomas Aquinas (ICUSTA), represented by presidents and representatives of Universities named after St. Thomas Aquinas, gathered in UST for the 10th biennial conference, hosted by the University. A solemn Eucharistic Celebration was held at Santisimo Rosario Parish, and was presided over by Archbishop Edward Joseph Adams, Apostolic Nuncio to the Philippines, and concelebrated by Bruno Cadoré, Master of the Order of Preachers, priests of the Dominican Province of the Philippines, and other guest priests. Following the Eucharistic Celebration, a keynote address was delivered by President Benigno Aquino III, in the presence of the Papal Legate for the UST Quadricentennial Celebrations, Cardinal Zenon Grocholewski.

==== Q Parade (January 26, 2011) ====
The Q Parade, held simultaneously with the opening of the ICUSTA, was joined by 7,200 students and 150 registered alumni.

The parade passed from UST to Morayta and then Recto and Mendiola. There were five floats, one each representing the four centuries of the university, and the "Q" float.

The first float represented the first century of the university with a replica of the statue of the founder, Miguel de Benavides. The second float showed a model of the Arch of the Centuries. The third float was designed after the Main Building which was built on the España campus in the 1920s. The fourth float was patterned after the UST Central Seminary with the Fountains of Wisdom and Knowledge. The Q float showcased models of the yet to be unveiled Quattromondial, the future Martyrs' Monument, and the Tria Haec, or the statues representing faith, hope, and love atop the Main Building.

The first four floats carried candidates for the Ideal Thomasian Personalities (TSITP) while the Q float carried reigning Thomasian personalities, Ms. Earth - Eco Tourism 2009 Angela Fernando, businessman Joel Cruz, and alumni who have won beauty pageant titles.

==== Cheermania XVI (January 26, 2011) ====
This annual competition was held on January 26, 2011, simultaneously happening with the ICUSTA Opening and Quadricentennial Parade. The university also invited other schools' dance companies to compete with each other featuring different Philippine festivals.

Cheermania was won by College of Commerce Cheering Squad. The Philippine Festival's Invitational Competition was won by FEU Dance Company, organized by the UST Student Organizations Coordinating Council (UST SOCC).

==== Q Grand Program (January 27, 2011) ====
Shortly after the unveiling of the Quattromondial at the Quadricentennial Park, a variety show similar to Paskuhan festivities took place at the UST Grandstand and Open Field. The program was opened by Fr. Pablo T. Tiong O.P., Vice Rector of the University.

During the program, Amadea Medina, a centenarian, was recognized by the University as the oldest living alumna at that time.

Various performances and segments took place. Among the performers were celebrities such as:

- Albert Martinez
- John Lapus
- Sarah Geronimo
- Jamie Rivera
- Aiza Seguerra
- Aiko Melendez
- Gary Valenciano
- Candy Pangilinan
- Erik Santos
- The Itchyworms

The program concluded at midnight with a pyromusical display coming from the UST Grandstand and Santisimo Rosario Parish, following the singing of the UST Hymn, marking the debut of the pyromusical as one of the university's popular traditions.

==== Quadricentennial Mass (January 28, 2011) ====
The University celebrated a Solemn Eucharistic Celebration on the Solemnity of St. Thomas Aquinas, patron of the University, presided over by Cardinal Zenon Grocholewski, Prefect of the Congregation for Catholic Education. In addition to the faculty, students, and alumni of the University, the following were among the guests who were present during the Eucharistic Celebration:

- His Eminence, Cardinal Gaudencio Rosales, Archbishop of Manila
- His Eminence, Cardinal Ricardo Vidal, Archbishop-Emeritus of Cebu
- His Excellency, Archbishop Edward Joseph Adams, Apostolic Nuncio to the Philippines
- Members of the Catholic Bishops' Conference of the Philippines
- Very Rev. Fr. Bruno Cadoré, OP, Master of the Order of Preachers, and Chancellor of the University
- Very Rev. Fr. Quirico T. Pedregosa Jr., OP, Prior Provincial of the Dominican Province of the Philippines, and Vice Chancellor
- Very Rev. Fr. Rolando V. de la Rosa, OP Rector Magnificus of the University of Santo Tomas
- Former Rectors of the University of Santo Tomas (Note: The living former rectors at the time of the Quadricentennial were Archbishop Leonardo Legaspi, Fr. Frederik Fermin, Fr. Norberto Castillo, Fr. Tamerlane Lana, and Fr. Ernesto Arceo.)
- Priests of the University and the Dominican Province of the Philippines, and priests-alumni of the University
- His Excellency, Luis Arias Romero, Ambassador of Spain to the Philippines
- Hon. Carlos Alberdi, from the Ministry of Foreign Affairs of Spain
- Alfredo Lim, Mayor of Manila
- Delegations of the ICUSTA

Fr. Cadore gave the welcome address at the beginning of the Mass, in his capacity as chancellor of the University. Archbishop Adams read the letter of Pope Benedict XVI, addressed to Cardinal Grocholewski, to serve as extraordinary envoy to the University's Quadricentennial Celebration, since the Pope wasn't able to participate in person. Towards the end of the Eucharistic Celebration, the people listened to the pre-recorded message of Pope Benedict XVI, prepared by the Centro Televisivo Vaticano. Grocholewski also bestowed an Apostolic Blessing, imparting a plenary indulgence. Grocholewski occupied the papal chair made by UST for Pope John Paul II in 1995.

==== One@400 and Quadri Fiesta (January 28, 2011) ====
Following the Eucharistic Celebration, a special university-wide Alumni Homecoming was held at the Plaza Mayor, where Thomasian Alumni and guests were treated to music by the UST Singers and messages from distinguished Thomasian Alumni. The event culminated with a pyromusical display from the University of Santo Tomas Main Building. Meanwhile, students took part in the Quadricentennial Fiesta in other parts of the University, where free food was also given to them.

=== World's Largest Human Cross (March 10, 2011) ===
The University formed the World's Largest Human Cross on March 10, 2011, coinciding with Ash Wednesday of that year. The members of the Thomasian Community, wearing black and white clothes, formed a Dominican cross at the UST Grandstand.

This record was verified by the Guinness World Records on August 10, 2011, with a total of 13,266 people, and stood for eight years, until the record was surpassed in 2019 when 13,310 participants gathered for the 2019 Chosen International Pathfinder Camporee in Oshkosh, Wisconsin, in the United States.

=== Closing Celebrations (January 23-27, 2012) ===
Dubbed the "Neo-centennial Celebration", this was a closing ceremony for the university's quadricentennial founding anniversary celebration which ran from January 25 to 27, 2012.

==== Velada Tomasina and Mass for Departed Thomasians (January 25, 2012) ====
The University kicked off the closing of the Quadricentennial Celebrations with the Velada Tomasina, a celebration where members of the Thomasian community reminisced the 19th century of the University through costumes and replicas of the old Intramuros campus, wherein during the morning the National Historical Commission of the Philippines unveiled a historical marker mounted on the pedestal of the monument of Archbishop Miguel de Benavides. In the afternoon, a procession of Our Lady of La Naval de Manila took place in the University Campus, culminating with a Eucharistic Celebration at the Plaza Mayor, presided over by Archbishop Leonardo Legaspi, the first Filipino Rector Magnificus of the University of Santo Tomas.

==== Kumpisalang Bayan, Eucharistic Celebration, 40,000 Voices, and Fireworks Display (January 27, 2012) ====
On the last day of the Quadricentennial Jubilee, the University held a Kumpisalang Bayan, where priests were available to administer the Sacrament of Reconciliation, a prerequisite for obtaining the plenary indulgence. Confessions were held at the open field and P. Noval covered court. Following the Kumpisalan, the Eucharistic Celebration began with an entrance procession from the Santisimo Rosario Parish to the UST Grandstand. The Mass was presided over by José S. Palma, Archbishop of Cebu, President of the Catholic Bishops' Conference of the Philippines, and alumnus of the University. Lingayen-Dagupan Archbishop Socrates Villegas, Vice President of the CBCP, gave the homily. Members of the Catholic Bishops' Conference of the Philippines, Dominican fathers, and priests-alumni concelebrated during the Mass. The University also listened to the message of then recently-installed Archbishop of Manila, Luis Antonio Tagle, and the address of thanks by Fr. Rolando de la Rosa, OP. Palma, who occupied the papal chair made for John Paul II in 1995, imparted the Apostolic Blessing with plenary indulgence.

Following the Eucharistic Celebration, students of the University serenaded the Thomasian Community with various sacred and secular songs, dubbed as 40,000 Voices for UST. Following the singing of the Quadricentennial Hymn and the UST Hymn, a ten-minute pyromusical display entitled Chariots of Fire took place, where fireworks came simultaneously from the Arch of the Centuries, Main Building, Santisimo Rosario Parish, and UST Grandstand, all declared National Treasures of the University. The pyrotechnics team were led by Thomasian Alumni Don Miguel Villarosa and John Oliver Zeng of Dragon Fireworks Inc. The Neo-centennial Grand Variety show, where Thomasian celebrities performed, was the final part of the University's Closing of the Quadricentennial.

== International recognition ==
=== Holy See's recognition ===
With UST being a pontifical university, Pope Benedict XVI was invited, and sent a special envoy, though he did not attend.

The pope declared a Jubilee year from January 2011 until January 2012, coinciding with the university's quadricentennial. The pope arranged to deliver a recorded video on January 28, feast day of St. Thomas Aquinas, and a thanksgiving mass was to be held.

In December 2010, the Roman Catholic Church's Apostolic Penitentiary allowed in a decree Archbishop Cardinal Gaudencio Rosales to bestow a papal blessing carrying a plenary indulgence in the Jubilee Mass held on January 24, 2011.

Upon the request of rector Rolando dela Rosa, a separate decree also granted plenary indulgences to participants.

== Commemoration and memorabilia ==
A 200-peso bill with the UST Quadricentennial logo and Philippine postage stamps featuring UST landmarks and symbols.

=== Commemorative bills and medals ===
Unveiled before the press conference held on January 21, 2011, Bangko Sentral ng Pilipinas (BSP) issued commemorative 200-peso bills with the UST Quadricentennial logo overprinted on them. BSP released two billion pesos' worth of these 200-peso bills into general circulation as legal tender (a total of 10 million pieces). The central bank also released 400 copies of uncut two-piece 200-peso bills (amounting to PhP 400.00).

BSP also issued commemorative gold and silver medals featuring the image of Miguel de Benavides, the university's founder.

=== Commemorative stamps ===
Named the Unending Grace stamps, the Philippine Postal Corp. issued four commemorative stamps with a 7-peso denomination. The designs featured were:

- UST Main Building
- Central Seminary
- Arch of the Centuries
- The Foundation of the University of Santo Tomas painting.

The PhilPost produced 100,000 pieces of these stamps, and 10,200 copies of souvenir sheets worth Php 37.00 each.

=== UST Quadricentennial Watch ===
The Swiss company Swatch produced four different designer watches to commemorate the university's 400th jubilee year. The watches were named:

- The Thomasian
- Dominican Duo - White
- Dominican Duo - Black
- Quadricentennial Swatch.
