= Ang Probinsyano season 1 =

Season of television series

Ang Probinsyano
- Season 1
- First version of Season 1's title card
- Starring: Coco Martin
- No. of episodes: 262

Release
- Original network: ABS-CBN
- Original release: September 28, 2015 – September 30, 2016

Season chronology
- ← Previous; N/A Next → Season 2

The first season of Ang Probinsyano, a Philippine action drama television series, premiered on September 28, 2015, on ABS-CBN's Primetime Bida evening block and worldwide on The Filipino Channel and concluded on September 30, 2016. The series stars Coco Martin in a dual role as SPO2 Ricardo Dalisay and Police S/Insp. Dominador de Leon, together with an ensemble cast.

The first season of Ang Probinsyano chronicled around the lives of Ricardo "Cardo" Dalisay and Dominador "Ador" de Leon, identical twins who were separated during childhood. Their lives intertwine once again when Ador was killed during a mission to stop a human trafficking syndicate. Cardo must now assume the identity of his brother and finish the mission, while also reconnecting with his biological family. After his cover was blown, Cardo was reassigned to CIDG where he handled cases that put him into conflict with the Tuazon family, a rich philanthropist family to the public, who are actually in the illicit business of drug and human trafficking.

== Plot ==
The story revolves around the journey of twins Dominador "Ador" de Leon and Ricardo "Cardo" Dalisay (both played by Coco Martin), who were separated from each other because of financial reasons, even as they followed the path of being police officers.

Ador is raised by his grandmother, Flora (Susan Roces). He enters the Philippine National Police Academy alongside Joaquin Tuazon (Arjo Atayde). During his stint in the Police Academy, he meets Carmen (Bela Padilla), sister of his classmate Billy (John Medina). After graduating as the class valedictorian, Ador marries Carmen upon discovering her pregnancy. Carmen gives birth to Dominador "Junior" de Leon, Jr. (Lei Andrei Navarro).

Ador continues to display his intelligence and skill as a policeman and is eventually promoted to Senior Inspector. He becomes a prominent and respected CIDG police official in Manila with a loving family as his support.

Cardo loves the solitude of mountains in the rural town of Botolan, Zambales. He grows up with his childhood best friend, Glen (Maja Salvador), who secretly has a crush on him. Both of them enter the police force, with Cardo joining the SAF.

Their lives take a sudden turn when Ador is betrayed and murdered by Joaquin after pursuing the latter's child-trafficking syndicate. Wanting to conceal the fact that Ador is killed in action, General Delfin Borja (Jaime Fábregas), Cardo and Ador's maternal great-uncle and CIDG Director, orders Cardo to assume Ador's identity and continue the mission his late brother left behind.

Cardo is forced to pretend to his brother's family and friends; and reunites with his grandmother, whom he resents for deserting him. Nevertheless, he promises to find the person behind his brother's death.

After his cover is blown, Cardo reveals himself and reunites with his family. Cardo is assigned back to CIDG and tackles various cases, some which ties directly to the Tuazon family's criminal acts.

== Cast and characters ==
Main cast

- Coco Martin as PS/Insp. Dominador "Ador" B. de Leon and SPO2 Ricardo "Cardo" Dalisay
- Maja Salvador as SPO1 Glenda "Glen" F. Corpuz
- Agot Isidro as Verna Syquia-Tuazon
- Jaime Fábregas as PC/Supt. Delfin S. Borja
- Arjo Atayde as PS/Insp. Joaquin S. Tuazon
- Bela Padilla as Carmen M. Guzman
- Albert Martinez as Tomas "Papa Tom" G. Tuazon
- Susan Roces as Kapitana Flora "Lola Kap" S. Borja-de Leon
- Eddie Garcia as Don Emilio Syquia

Recurring cast

- Joey Marquez as Nanding Corpuz
- Malou de Guzman as Lolit Fajardo-Corpuz
- Dennis Padilla as Edgar Guzman
- Ana Roces as Leonora "Nora" Montano-Guzman
- Malou Crisologo as Yolanda "Yolly" Capuyao-Santos
- Beverly Salviejo as "Yaya" Cita Roque
- Pepe Herrera as Benjamin "Benny" Dimaapi
- Marvin Yap as Elmo Santos
- Eda Nolan as Brenda F. Corpuz
- Belle Mariano as Rachel S. Tuazon
- Art Acuña as PS/Supt. Roy Carreon
- John Medina as PS/Insp. Avel "Billy" M. Guzman
- Lester Llansang as PS/Insp. Mark Vargas
- John Prats as SPO2 Jerome Girona, Jr.
- Michael Roy Jornales as PS/Insp. Francisco "Chikoy" Rivera
- Marc Acueza as PS/Insp. Bernardino "Dino" Robles
- Rino Marco as PS/Insp. Gregorio "Greg" Sebastian
- Marc Solis as SPO1 Rigor Soriano
- Yassi Pressman as Alyana R. Arevalo
- Ping Medina as Diego Sahagun
- Mhyco Aquino as Lorenz Gabriel
- Benj Manalo as Felipe "Pinggoy" Tanyag, Jr.
- Brace Arquiza as Ryan M. Guzman
- Joel Torre as Teodoro "Teddy" Arevalo
- Shamaine Centenera-Buencamino as Virginia "Virgie" R. Arevalo
- McCoy de Leon as Juan Pablo "JP" R. Arevalo
- Elisse Joson as Lorraine Pedrosa
- Lander Vera Perez as Alfred Borromeo
- Kiray Celis as Mitch
- Daisy Reyes as Belen Girona
- Lei Andrei Navarro as Dominador "Junior" G. de Leon, Jr.
- Simon Ezekiel Pineda as Honorio "Onyok" Amaba
- McNeal "Awra" Briguela as Macario "Makmak" Samonte, Jr.

Guest cast

- Julio Diaz as Julian Valerio/George Hernandez (Note: Julio Diaz's character was initially named George Hernandez. However, in his subsequent appearances, Diaz's chraracter took the name Julian Valerio. Because the latter name was used after he had already been convicted, it could be gleaned that the former name was an alias.)
- Tess Antonio as Train Passenger (Mother)
- Raikko Mateo as Train Passenger (Son)
- Gloria Sevilla as Purificación Moreno
- Cris Villanueva as P/Insp. Rev. Fr. Torre
- Lance Lucido as young Ryan Guzman
- Lisa Marie Marcos as young Rachel Tuazon
- Tony Mabesa as Priest at Ador and Carmen's wedding and Ador's burial
- Jao Mapa as PO1 Salas
- Ramon Christopher as SPO1 Ramos
- Baron Geisler as David S. Madarang (Note: Baron Geisler's character was nameless when he appeared on the show. His name was only revealed during the show's seventh season through his twin brother Dante Madarang, who was also played by Geisler.)
- Allyson McBride as Nicole Santos
- Izzy Canillo as young Ador de Leon and Cardo de Leon
- Alfonso Yñigo Delen as Buboy
- Felix Roco as Mall Crook
- Giovanni Baldisseri as PC/Insp. Lemuel Peralta (Note: The character was nameless when he first appeared on the show. His name was only revealed during the show's third season during the funeral service for the fallen members of SAF in the ill-fated mission on Mount Karagao.)
- Zeppi Borromeo as PO3 Roberto "Bong" de Vera
- Sandino Martin as PO3 Marlon Delgado
- Liza Diño as Hostaged Reporter
- Epi Quizon as Rebel Commander
- Zaijan Jaranilla as Cocoy Amaba
- Gio Alvarez as Arabas Amaba
- Mymy Davao as Elena "Lena" Amaba
- Crispin Pineda as Community Leader
- Nadine Samonte as Rose Dalisay
- Marco Alcaraz as PC/Insp. Dr. Ramon Dalisay, MD
- Sharlene San Pedro as teenage Glen Corpuz
- Nash Aguas as teenage Ador de Leon and Cardo Dalisay
- Jett Pangan as Edson Lee
- Iza Calzado as Col. Olivia Buenaventura
- Richard Quan as SPO4 Nestor Defra
- Hyubs Azarcon as SPO1 Rolando "Lando" Reyes (Note: Hyubs Azarcon's character was nameless when he first appeared on the show. His name would only be revealed when he reappeared on the show's sixth season.)
- Richard Yap as Philip Tang
- David Chua as Kevin
- Tart Carlos as Juanita "J.Lo" Burton
- Xia Vigor as Keana Burton
- Carla Humphries as Teacher Ofelia
- Miguel Gabriel Diokno as Iñigo dela Paz
- Rufa Mi as Iñigo's nanny
- Jong Cuenco as Governor Edward dela Paz
- Jade Ecleo as Mrs. dela Paz
- Tutti Caringal as Dencio
- Lloyd Zaragoza as Dencio's partner
- Neil Coleta as MMDA Constable Miguel Clemente
- Eli Almiranes as MMDA Constable Andres "Andoy" Torre Jr.
- Val Iglesias as Bus Hijacker
- Yayo Aguila as Marita de Vela
- Kathleen Hermosa as Teresa "Tere" de Vela
- Jay Manalo as Victor Mangubat
- Ronaldo Valdez as Leonardo Demetrio/Conrado "Ninong" Villegas (Note: Upon his release from prison, Leonardo Demetrio began using the assumed name Conrado Villegas. As head of the organized crime family, Demetrio goes by the title Ninong.)
- Rex Lapid as Gusting
- Maricar Reyes as Isabel
- Joem Bascon as Raymond
- Polo Ravales as Brad
- Hannah Ledesma as Jenna
- Miguel Faustmann as Kenneth Burton
- Sunshine Garcia as Noemi Dominguez
- Gina Pareño as Maria Olga "Madam Olga" Fernandez
- Susan Africa as Lorena
- Myrtle Sarrosa as Doreen Villaluna
- Justin Cuyugan as Apolinario "Apple" Mauricio
- Dawn Chang as Elaine Gomez
- Jason Francisco as Arnold Cortes
- Shey Bustamante as Cristina Jane "Tina" Laxamana
- Boy Roque as Yacht Helmsman
- Anne Curtis as Katrina "Trina" N. Trinidad
- Christopher de Leon as Michael "Mike" Alonso
- Ogie Diaz as Fritz
- Nonie Buencamino as Roberto Homer "Scarface" Dimayuga
- Alexa Macanan as teenage Trina N. Trinidad
- Cheska Iñigo as Rosella Noble-Alonzo
- Mico Palanca as Jake
- Jan Marini as PO3 Maricel Marquez
- Boom Labrusca as Waldo
- William Lorenzo as Berting
- Ana Capri as Ligaya (Berting's wife)
- Gerard Pizarras as SPO1 Marquez
- Pen Medina as Fernan
- Eric Quizon as Dr. Ivan Gomez
- Josh Ivan Morales as Tony
- Gelli de Belen as Belinda Ojeda
- Angelou Alayon as Jordan Ojeda, Jr.
- Niña Dolino as Iris
- Eric Fructuoso as Benjamin Joseph "Banjo" Moreno
- Alex Medina as Allen
- Jordan Herrera as Charlie Malibay
- Jef-Henson Dee as Olan
- Michael Rivero as Macario "Sir Bok" Samonte
- Tonton Gutierrez as SPO4 Pablo B. de Leon
- Ritz Azul as Erica Nobleza
- Yogo Singh as Jepoy
- Inah Estrada as Cristina Nobleza
- Jess Lapid, Jr. as PS/Insp. Raul Toribio
- Jake Cuenca as Jonas Paulino
- Elmo Magalona as Andrew Abella
- Janella Salvador as Denise Paulino
- JC Santos as young Emilio Syquia
- Jane Oineza as young Flora Borja
- Toby Alejar as Mr. Paulino
- Maila Gumila as Mrs. Paulino
- Franco Daza as Kirk
- Emmanuelle Vera as April Hizon
- Kyra Custodio as Lisa
- Melissa Mendez as Mrs. Abella
- Ian de Leon as PS/Supt. Bartolome "Bart" Catindig
- Smokey Manaloto as Gordon Layug
- Victor Neri as Mayor Anton Guerrero
- Mon Confiado as Cheng Lao
- Bonel Balingit as Totoy Layug
- Lilia Cuntapay as Loring Layug
- Angelica Panganiban as Marta B. Maglipon/Jade Blanco (Note: Jade Blanco is the alias Cheng Lao gave Marta Maglipon to carry out her role as a drug mule.)
- Nikki Valdez as Analynne Canlaon
- Veyda Inoval as young Analynne
- Avery Balasbas as young Marta
- Suzette Ranillo as Dely (Analynne's mother)
- Lui Villaruz as Domeng Canlaon
- Renzel Palaje as Chabita
- Tina Paner as Teresa "Teri" Porres
- Yesha Camile as Angela Canlaon
- Juan Rodrigo as Romeo "Romy" Maglipon
- Wendell Ramos as Nelson Wong
- Cesar Montano as PS/Insp. Hector Mercurio
- Meg Imperial as Maribel "Marie" Alegre
- Bembol Roco as PC/Supt. Redentor Almario
- Bernadette Allyson-Estrada as Irene Mercurio
- Erin Ocampo as Ella
- Eddie Gutierrez as P/DGen. (Chief PNP) Rodolfo D. Recto
- Geraldine Villamil as Dahlia
- Archie Adamos as Leroy
- Manuel Chua as Zaldy
- Kiko Matos as Enteng
- Emilio Garcia as Atong
- Vice Ganda as Emmanuel "Ella" Moreno/Magdalena/Sharmaine (Note: Ella is the name Emmanuel Moreno chose to go by upon coming out of the closet. In his various schemes, Moreno used the aliases Magdalena and Sharmaine.)
- Chokoleit as Jonel
- Pooh as Wanda
- Thou Reyes as Bogart
- Jeffrey Santos as Ella's neighbor
- Jordan Castillo as Ella's neighbor
- Bret Jackson as Matthew "Matt" Bale
- Candy Pangilinan as Aida Bale
- Lee O'Brien as Roland Bale
- Josh de Guzman as young Wanda/Juan
- JB Agustin as young Ella/Emmanuel
- Lance Macalinao as young Jonel
- John Regala as Congressman Randolf Subito
- Rubi Ruiz as Choleng
- Maria Isabel Lopez as Clarissa Subito
- Albie Casiño as Richmond Subito
- Cherry Pie Picache as Linda Aguilar
- Carlo Aquino as Marlon Aguilar
- Allan Paule as Melencio Aguilar
- Ronnie Quizon as Romulo
- Chanel Morales as Richmond's female drug consumer
- Raph Robes as Richmond's friend
- Ethan Salvador as Governor's son and Richmond's fellow drug dealer
- James Blanco as Edwin H. Maniego
- Paulo Avelino as Eric "Erwin" H. Maniego (Note: Erwin was the alias used by Eric Maniego in order to pose as an intellectually disabled man, the end game of which was to get closer to Cardo and his family and eventually enact his revenge.)
- Nico Antonio as Jacinto "Entoy" Santos (Note: Apart from his nickname, Entoy was practically nameless until his reappearance in the sixth season.)
- Jan Michael Patricio Andres as young Eric
- Jahren Dave Estorque as young Edwin
- Grae Fernandez as teenage Eric
- Jairus Aquino as teenage Edwin
- Jenny Miller as Eric and Edwin's stepmother
- Jef Gaitan as Lara
- Earl Ignacio as SOCO Police Officer Dante
- Jojo Riguerra as Mr. Recio
- Efren Reyes Jr. as Apollo Magat
- Jayson Gainza as Jimboy Escaño
- Jose Sarasola as Apollo's henchman
- Joseph Ison as Apollo's henchman

== Episodes ==
No. overall	No. in season	Title	Original air date	Kantar media rating (nationwide)
1	1	"Ang Simula"	September 28, 2015	41.6%
2	2	"Tungkulin"	September 29, 2015	39.8%
3	3	"Buhay"	September 30, 2015	39.4%
4	4	"Traydor"	October 1, 2015	37.3%
5	5	"Cardo"	October 2, 2015	39.7%
6	6	"Tagaligtas"	October 5, 2015	40.7%
7	7	"Misyon"	October 6, 2015	41.2%
8	8	"Unang Hakbang"	October 7, 2015	39.6%
9	9	"Paghahanda"	October 8, 2015	42.6%
10	10	"Katauhan"	October 9, 2015	40.2%
11	11	"Pagbabalik"	October 12, 2015	41.1%
12	12	"Bagong Buhay"	October 13, 2015	41.2%
13	13	"Onyok in Manila"	October 14, 2015	41.6%
14	14	"Jump"	October 15, 2015	42.9%
15	15	"Help Onyok"	October 16, 2015	41.4%
16	16	"Cardo To The Rescue"	October 19, 2015	36.9%
17	17	"CarYok"	October 20, 2015	36.0%
18	18	"Partner"	October 21, 2015	35.4%
19	19	"Glen in Manila"	October 22, 2015	37.7%
20	20	"Pagtatanggi"	October 23, 2015	39.7%
21	21	"Sugod"	October 26, 2015	38.5%
22	22	"Hinala"	October 27, 2015	37.2%
23	23	"Alaala"	October 28, 2015	38.5%
24	24	"Patunay"	October 29, 2015	38.7%
25	25	"Katotohanan"	October 30, 2015	37.7%
26	26	"Kaarawan"	November 2, 2015	40.3%
27	27	"Dalamhati"	November 3, 2015	40.6%
28	28	"Hamon"	November 4, 2015	39.1%
29	29	"Resbak"	November 5, 2015	39.3%
30	30	"Target"	November 6, 2015	38.9%
31	31	"Pagsiwalat"	November 9, 2015	39.8%
32	32	"Pagluluksa"	November 10, 2015	41.4%
33	33	"Paguwi"	November 11, 2015	39.6%
34	34	"Bwelta"	November 12, 2015	41.6%
35	35	"Pursigido"	November 13, 2015	39.5%
36	36	"Order"	November 16, 2015	40.5%
37	37	"Agresibo"	November 17, 2015	39.9%
38	38	"Akala"	November 18, 2015	38.1%
39	39	"Kutob"	November 19, 2015	40.9%
40	40	"Resulta"	November 20, 2015	40.9%
41	41	"Pagsunod"	November 23, 2015	38.6%
42	42	"Sandigan"	November 24, 2015	40.3%
43	43	"Hostage"	November 25, 2015	39.1%
44	44	"Sisi"	November 26, 2015	40.4%
45	45	"Lipat"	November 27, 2015	40.2%
46	46	"Dancing Pulis"	November 30, 2015	38.5%
47	47	"Tulong"	December 1, 2015	40.6%
48	48	"Habulan"	December 2, 2015	39.2%
49	49	"Huwaran"	December 3, 2015	40.4%
50	50	"Pagbibigayan"	December 4, 2015	38.2%
51	51	"Diskarte"	December 7, 2015	40.3%
52	52	"Brad Angelina"	December 8, 2015	41.8%
53	53	"Bingit"	December 9, 2015	41.8%
54	54	"Kasabwat"	December 10, 2015	41.2%
55	55	"Salisi"	December 11, 2015	38.2%
56	56	"Caroling"	December 14, 2015	37.6%
57	57	"Unahan"	December 15, 2015	35.4%
58	58	"Paghahanap"	December 16, 2015	35.9%
59	59	"Salakay"	December 17, 2015	35.2%
60	60	"Natunton"	December 18, 2015	36.0%
61	61	"Pagtatago"	December 21, 2015	37.4%
62	62	"Clowns"	December 22, 2015	37.6%
63	63	"Pamilya"	December 23, 2015	35.0%
64	64	"Hiling"	December 24, 2015	28.2%
65	65	"Oportunidad"	December 25, 2015	30.2%
66	66	"Profile"	December 28, 2015	35.9%
67	67	"Ligaw"	December 29, 2015	36.6%
68	68	"Date"	December 30, 2015	34.2%
69	69	"Pakay"	December 31, 2015	26.8%
70	70	"Kapiling"	January 1, 2016	32.8%
71	71	"Hadlang"	January 4, 2016	37.7%
72	72	"Pagtutuos"	January 5, 2016	37.6%
73	73	"Kasangga"	January 6, 2016	38.2%
74	74	"Bihag"	January 7, 2016	39.3%
75	75	"Bentahan"	January 8, 2016	37.0%
76	76	"Kidnap"	January 11, 2016	37.0%
77	77	"Personal"	January 12, 2016	37.8%
78	78	"Paloma"	January 13, 2016	41.1%
79	79	"Pick Up"	January 14, 2016	41.5%
80	80	"Simpatya"	January 15, 2016	40.9%
81	81	"Sales Lady"	January 18, 2016	41.2%
82	82	"Crush"	January 19, 2016	39.7%
83	83	"Duda"	January 20, 2016	40.9%
84	84	"Maling Akala"	January 21, 2016	41.9%
85	85	"Confirmed"	January 22, 2016	39.1%
86	86	"Beauty Contest"	January 25, 2016	41.9%
87	87	"Dakpin si Paloma"	January 26, 2016	41.8%
88	88	"Paloma sa Casa"	January 27, 2016	42.3%
89	89	"Hanapan"	January 28, 2016	43.7%
90	90	"Bidding"	January 29, 2016	40.2%
91	91	"Paloma in Action"	February 1, 2016	45.9%
92	92	"Iligtas si Carmen"	February 2, 2016	46.7%
93	93	"Kapit Cardo"	February 3, 2016	41.1%
94	94	"Dalaw"	February 4, 2016	45.2%
95	95	"Sorpresa ni Diego"	February 5, 2016	43.2%
96	96	"Set Up"	February 8, 2016	45.8%
97	97	"Pangamba"	February 9, 2016	45.3%
98	98	"Mukha ng Kaaway"	February 10, 2016	45.0%
99	99	"Laglagan"	February 11, 2016	45.4%
100	100	"Bakbakan"	February 12, 2016	43.5%
101	101	"Hulihin si Philip"	February 15, 2016	44.7%
102	102	"Trina sa Panganib"	February 16, 2016	43.0%
103	103	"Bodyguard"	February 17, 2016	42.0%
104	104	"Bantay Sarado"	February 18, 2016	43.5%
105	105	"Miss Pasaway"	February 19, 2016	41.9%
106	106	"Kaligtasan"	February 22, 2016	43.4%
107	107	"Para Paraan"	February 23, 2016	41.9%
108	108	"Saradong Puso"	February 24, 2016	41.7%
109	109	"Escort ni Trina"	February 25, 2016	39.6%
110	110	"Tagapagtanggol"	February 26, 2016	37.4%
111	111	"Pakikisamahan"	February 29, 2016	41.4%
112	112	"Pagnanasa"	March 1, 2016	42.3%
113	113	"To the Rescue"	March 2, 2016	41.6%
114	114	"Nagtatago"	March 3, 2016	43.0%
115	115	"Bilis Cardo"	March 4, 2016	41.3%
116	116	"Bukas Puso"	March 7, 2016	43.4%
117	117	"Dukot Bata"	March 8, 2016	40.4%
118	118	"Paalala"	March 9, 2016	39.3%
119	119	"Sinumpaan"	March 10, 2016	40.5%
120	120	"Bagong Salta"	March 11, 2016	38.6%
121	121	"Pakitang Tao"	March 14, 2016	41.4%
122	122	"Pakikitungo"	March 15, 2016	41.2%
123	123	"Nasaan si Junior"	March 16, 2016	41.2%
124	124	"Match"	March 17, 2016	42.4%
125	125	"Operasyon"	March 18, 2016	38.8%
126	126	"Ligalig"	March 21, 2016	41.3%
127	127	"Kooperasyon"	March 22, 2016	41.8%
128	128	"Pahamak"	March 23, 2016	39.1%
129	129	"Bingit"	March 28, 2016	42.3%
130	130	"Riding In Tandem"	March 29, 2016	42.6%
131	131	"Eskapo"	March 30, 2016	41.5%
132	132	"Pananakot"	March 31, 2016	40.8%
133	133	"Puntirya"	April 1, 2016	40.3%
134	134	"Atraso"	April 4, 2016	43.4%
135	135	"Pinagkalulong"	April 5, 2016	42.7%
136	136	"Paglisan"	April 6, 2016	42.8%
137	137	"Paalam Carmen"	April 7, 2016	41.0%
138	138	"Koneksyon"	April 8, 2016	41.1%
139	139	"Ambush"	April 11, 2016	42.7%
140	140	"Atake"	April 12, 2016	42.5%
141	141	"Duelo"	April 13, 2016	42.5%
142	142	"Malasakit"	April 14, 2016	42.4%
143	143	"Nagkukubli"	April 15, 2016	40.5%
144	144	"Binabalak"	April 18, 2016	40.4%
145	145	"Saloobin"	April 19, 2016	41.5%
146	146	"Magtatangka"	April 20, 2016	41.4%
147	147	"Bintang"	April 21, 2016	43.7%
148	148	"Kagustuhan"	April 22, 2016	41.4%
149	149	"Sagipin"	April 25, 2016	42.5%
150	150	"Pagdiriwang"	April 26, 2016	43.2%
151	151	"Karangalan"	April 27, 2016	41.5%
152	152	"Natakasan"	April 28, 2016	40.3%
153	153	"Pagsuyo"	April 29, 2016	36.9%
154	154	"Paliga Ni Lola"	May 2, 2016	39.7%
155	155	"Goodvibes"	May 3, 2016	38.7%
156	156	"Party"	May 4, 2016	40.7%
157	157	"Maskara"	May 5, 2016	40.7%
158	158	"Masked Man"	May 6, 2016	39.4%
159	159	"Paninindigan"	May 10, 2016	42.9%
160	160	"Pagsumamo"	May 11, 2016	40.1%
161	161	"Pagkikita"	May 12, 2016	42.7%
162	162	"Atensyon"	May 13, 2016	40.4%
163	163	"Kasama Kita"	May 16, 2016	42.6%
164	164	"Sugod Bahay"	May 17, 2016	42.3%
165	165	"Loteng"	May 18, 2016	39.3%
166	166	"Happy Birthday Glen"	May 19, 2016	42.9%
167	167	"Taya"	May 20, 2016	38.9%
168	168	"Pagtatakpan"	May 23, 2016	40.8%
169	169	"Benny Bangkay"	May 24, 2016	40.8%
170	170	"Panghihimasok"	May 25, 2016	42.6%
171	171	"Protektado"	May 26, 2016	44.2%
172	172	"Patibong"	May 27, 2016	41.5%
173	173	"Bangka"	May 30, 2016	42.8%
174	174	"Binaliktad"	May 31, 2016	41.0%
175	175	"Kapangyarihan"	June 1, 2016	43.7%
176	176	"Madidiin"	June 2, 2016	42.5%
177	177	"Dignidad"	June 3, 2016	41.3%
178	178	"Tunggalian"	June 6, 2016	44.8%
179	179	"Karma"	June 7, 2016	44.8%
180	180	"Balik Eskwela"	June 8, 2016	43.3%
181	181	"Pagkakaibigan"	June 9, 2016	43.6%
182	182	"Kagipitan"	June 10, 2016	41.7%
183	183	"Tatanggapin"	June 13, 2016	42.0%
184	184	"Suporta"	June 14, 2016	42.3%
185	185	"Puslit"	June 15, 2016	42.5%
186	186	"Arestado"	June 16, 2016	43.0%
187	187	"Cardo in HK"	June 17, 2016	38.8%
188	188	"Takbuhan"	June 20, 2016	41.8%
189	189	"Wanted"	June 21, 2016	41.8%
190	190	"Salaysay"	June 22, 2016	42.6%
191	191	"Kabado"	June 23, 2016	42.0%
192	192	"Paglantad"	June 24, 2016	39.4%
193	193	"Safehouse"	June 27, 2016	40.7%
194	194	"Pasakit"	June 28, 2016	40.5%
195	195	"Pagtugis"	June 29, 2016	41.0%
196	196	"Bomba"	June 30, 2016	43.1%
197	197	"Kakampi"	July 1, 2016	39.8%
198	198	"Asintado"	July 4, 2016	44.2%
199	199	"Curfew"	July 5, 2016	43.3%
200	200	"Paglabag"	July 6, 2016	42.7%
201	201	"Kaugnayan"	July 7, 2016	44.6%
202	202	"Alegasyon"	July 8, 2016	42.6%
203	203	"Motibo"	July 11, 2016	43.0%
204	204	"Pagkakilala"	July 12, 2016	42.4%
205	205	"Napaginitan"	July 13, 2016	43.1%
206	206	"Gulatan"	July 14, 2016	43.6%
207	207	"Harapan"	July 15, 2016	44.1%
208	208	"Ultimatum"	July 18, 2016	42.4%
209	209	"Engkwentro"	July 19, 2016	44.2%
210	210	"Labanan"	July 20, 2016	45.7%
211	211	"Panatag"	July 21, 2016	45.6%
212	212	"Alaga"	July 22, 2016	41.4%
213	213	"Girl In The Rain"	July 25, 2016	43.8%
214	214	"Bantay"	July 26, 2016	41.8%
215	215	"Kagat"	July 27, 2016	42.8%
216	216	"Negosyo"	July 28, 2016	42.0%
217	217	"Palugit"	July 29, 2016	41.1%
218	218	"Ruweda"	August 1, 2016	43.5%
219	219	"Banta"	August 2, 2016	42.3%
220	220	"Kaagapay"	August 3, 2016	41.9%
221	221	"Iskandalo"	August 4, 2016	43.1%
222	222	"Paloma Is Back"	August 5, 2016	40.8%
223	223	"Kabugan"	August 8, 2016	43.3%
224	224	"Kumbinsi"	August 9, 2016	43.9%
225	225	"Blackmail"	August 10, 2016	43.1%
226	226	"Paloma Vs. Ella"	August 11, 2016	42.8%
227	227	"Dawit"	August 12, 2016	40.6%
228	228	"Plano"	August 15, 2016	40.3%
229	229	"Mitsa"	August 16, 2016	40.9%
230	230	"Gantimpala"	August 17, 2016	40.6%
231	231	"Pagsabog"	August 18, 2016	40.2%
232	232	"Bagabag"	August 19, 2016	40.3%
233	233	"Trauma"	August 22, 2016	40.8%
234	234	"Galing"	August 23, 2016	39.1%
235	235	"Siklab"	August 24, 2016	39.6%
236	236	"Dalahin"	August 25, 2016	38.9%
237	237	"Mukha"	August 26, 2016	40.9%
238	238	"Ligpit"	August 29, 2016	40.2%
239	239	"Kasunduan"	August 30, 2016	40.3%
240	240	"Mastermind"	August 31, 2016	41.3%
241	241	"Timbog"	September 1, 2016	39.8%
242	242	"Huli"	September 2, 2016	39.4%
243	243	"Raid"	September 5, 2016	42.7%
244	244	"Batas"	September 6, 2016	42.8%
245	245	"Pagdakip"	September 7, 2016	41.1%
246	246	"Biktima"	September 8, 2016	38.9%
247	247	"Intensyon"	September 9, 2016	38.7%
248	248	"Suplong"	September 12, 2016	38.7%
249	249	"Lusot"	September 13, 2016	39.6%
250	250	"Sakay"	September 14, 2016	40.1%
251	251	"Kadugo"	September 15, 2016	40.1%
252	252	"Ganti"	September 16, 2016	40.0%
253	253	"Hustisya"	September 19, 2016	36.0%
254	254	"Linlang"	September 20, 2016	37.4%
255	255	"Balak"	September 21, 2016	38.8%
256	256	"Bisita"	September 22, 2016	36.8%
257	257	"Tuklas"	September 23, 2016	35.9%
258	258	"Paglaya"	September 26, 2016	39.0%
259	259	"Bisto"	September 27, 2016	38.2%
260	260	"Bitag"	September 28, 2016	39.8%
261	261	"Kabayaran"	September 29, 2016	41.0%
262	262	"Kawalan"	September 30, 2016	37.8%

Legend
Peak Season Rating
Lowest Season Rating
