= Ang Probinsyano season 2 =

Season of television series

Ang Probinsyano
- Season 2
- First version of Season 2's title card.
- Starring: Coco Martin
- No. of episodes: 166

Release
- Original network: ABS-CBN
- Original release: October 3, 2016 – May 24, 2017

Season chronology
- ← Previous; Season 1 Next → Season 3

The second season of Ang Probinsyano, a Philippine action drama television series on ABS-CBN, premiered on October 3, 2016, on the network's Primetime Bida evening block and worldwide on The Filipino Channel and concluded on May 24, 2017. The series stars Coco Martin as SPO2 Ricardo Dalisay, together with an ensemble cast consisting of Susan Roces, Arjo Atayde, Albert Martinez, Agot Isidro, Jaime Fabregas, and Eddie Garcia.

The second season of Ang Probinsyano shows the Tuazon family's façade slowly unravel, leading their conflict with Cardo to become even more direct than it was when they were shrouded in anonymity. The Tuazons then succeed in smearing Cardo's name by securing his conviction for drug trafficking. Cardo would later escape and find incriminating evidence against the Tuazons, and along the way exonerating himself. In his search for justice, Cardo also uncovers the Tuazons involvement in the demise of his father, brother and sister-in-law.

== Plot ==
Tomas Tuazon (Albert Martinez), Joaquin's (Arjo Atayde) father, is revealed as the head of the drug syndicate Cardo (Coco Martin) battles. Don Emilio Syquia (Eddie Garcia), Tomas' father-in-law, gets fed up with Tomas taking control of the drug syndicate for himself and orchestrates events that would pit Cardo against Tomas. Tomas is ultimately captured by Cardo in a drug sting, and is subsequently convicted. To retaliate, Joaquin and Don Emilio frame Cardo for illegal drug possession. While inside the maximum security prison, Cardo and Tomas continue to engage in conflicts, which further intensifies when Don Emilio reveals the truth to Cardo that Tomas killed Cardo's former sister-in-law, Carmen (Bela Padilla). As Tomas attempts to escape prison, Cardo kills him.

Following Tomas' death, Joaquin and General Rogelio Jacob (Rez Cortez) hire a new, even more cruel Bureau of Corrections Director, Guillermo Acosta (Dindo Arroyo). Under their payroll, Acosta makes prison life more difficult for Cardo. Cardo participates in a jailbreak and is determined to clear his name. He continues to pursue the syndicate responsible for his frame up. To that end, using the name of Miguel, he joins his allies in prison Ramil "Manager" Taduran (Michael de Mesa) and Julian Valerio (Julio Diaz) who work for the Cebu-based drug syndicate of Romano "Chairman" Recio (Ronnie Lazaro), an ally of Joaquin, to take the syndicate down.

The organization continues to threaten his family and has many connections in society, including the police and government. Unknown to Cardo, the syndicate who framed him is the same syndicate responsible for the deaths of his loved ones, including Ador.

Don Emilio is captured by Cardo and convicted for the murder of Cardo's father, SPO4 Pablo B. de Leon (Tonton Gutierrez). Cardo and his prison allies take down Recio's drug syndicate and after surrendering, Cardo's innocence is proven after Joaquin is exposed for his crimes. Cardo obtains incriminating evidence including Colonel Roy Carreon's (Art Acuña) testimony that he previously secretly worked for Joaquin. Joaquin is exposed as Ador's murderer and for his part in covering up and leading a drug and human trafficking syndicate.

Cardo kills Joaquin after the latter disrupts his wedding to Alyana (Yassi Pressman), finally avenging his twin's death.

== Cast and characters ==
Main cast

- Coco Martin as SPO2 Ricardo "Cardo" Dalisay
- Agot Isidro as Verna Syquia-Tuazon
- Jaime Fábregas as PC/Supt. Delfin S. Borja
- Arjo Atayde as PC/Insp. Joaquin S. Tuazon
- Bela Padilla as Carmen M. Guzman (Note: Padilla was briefly credited as part of the main cast during her reappearance in Cardo's dream.)
- Albert Martinez as Tomas "Papa Tom" G. Tuazon
- Susan Roces as Kapitana Flora "Lola Kap" S. Borja-de Leon
- Eddie Garcia as Don Emilio Syquia

Recurring cast

- Malou Crisologo as Yolanda "Yolly" Capuyao-Santos
- Beverly Salviejo as "Yaya" Cita Roque
- Pepe Herrera as Benjamin "Benny" Dimaapi
- Marvin Yap as Elmo Santos
- Art Acuña as PS/Supt. Roy Carreon
- John Medina as PS/Insp. Avel "Billy" M. Guzman
- Lester Llansang as PS/Insp. Mark Vargas
- John Prats as SPO3 Jerome Girona, Jr.
- Michael Roy Jornales as PS/Insp. Francisco "Chikoy" Rivera
- Marc Acueza as PS/Insp. Bernardino "Dino" Robles
- Rino Marco as PS/Insp. Gregorio "Greg" Sebastian
- Marc Solis as SPO1 Rigor Soriano
- Yassi Pressman as Alyana R. Arevalo-Dalisay
- Benj Manalo as Felipe "Pinggoy" Tanyag, Jr.
- Joel Torre as Teodoro "Teddy" Arevalo
- Shamaine Centenera-Buencamino as Virginia "Virgie" R. Arevalo
- McCoy de Leon as Juan Pablo "JP" R. Arevalo
- Elisse Joson as Lorraine Pedrosa
- Lander Vera Perez as Alfred Borromeo
- Kiray Celis as Mitch
- Simon Ezekiel Pineda as Honorio "Onyok" Amaba
- McNeal "Awra" Briguela as Macario "Makmak" Samonte, Jr.
- James "Paquito" Sagarino as Paquito Alvarado
- Rhian "Dang" Ramos as Amanda "Dang" Ignacio
- Shantel Crislyn Layh "Ligaya" Ngujo as Ligaya Dungalo
- Lei Andrei Navarro as Dominador "Junior" G. de Leon, Jr.
- Dennis Padilla as Edgar Guzman
- Ana Roces as Leonora "Nora" Montano-Guzman
- Brace Arquiza as Ryan M. Guzman
- Daisy Reyes as Belen Girona

Guest cast

- Efren Reyes Jr. as Apollo Magat
- Jayson Gainza as Jimboy Escaño
- Jose Sarasola as Apollo's henchman
- Joseph Ison as Apollo's henchman
- Mike Agassi as Froilan Asuncion
- Bradley Holmes as Franco
- Eddie Gutierrez as P/DGen. (Chief PNP) Rodolfo D. Recto
- Valerie Concepcion as Nurse Andrea
- Sophia Reola as young Alyana R. Arevalo
- Rez Cortez as PC/Supt. Rogelio Jacob
- Ricardo Cepeda as PC/Insp. Albertino Tejada
- Gerald Madrid as SPO2 Regalado
- Janus del Prado as Allan dela Paz/Jonel
- Paolo Serrano as SPO2 Soliman
- Miguel Enrile as Makmak's school bully
- Bing Davao as Roderick Wang
- TJ Trinidad as Atty. Patrick (Tomas' Lawyer)
- Cassey Mae Real as Trixie
- DJ Durano as Wang's right-hand man
- Antoinette Taus as Maggie Padua
- Tirso Cruz III as Judge Arturo "Art" M. Padua
- Johnny Revilla as Prosecutor
- Jun Urbano as Damian
- Nonong "Bangky" de Andres as Gorio
- Michelle Vito as Janice Vergel
- Tom Olivar as J/Dir. Raul Olarte
- Bearwin Meily as JO2 Timbang (Olarte's Jailguard)
- Dan Alvaro as Olarte's Jailguard
- Rommel Montano as Brando
- Archie Alemania as Choy
- Lloyd Zaragoza as Inmate
- Eli Almiranes as Andres "Andoy" Torre Jr.
- Dido dela Paz as Inmate
- Christian Vasquez as Benedicto Vergel
- Michael de Mesa as Ramil "Manager" Taduran
- Carlo Maceda as Douglas
- Desiree del Valle as Monica Montenegro
- Menggie Cobarrubbias as Cardo's defense lawyer
- Minco Fabregas as Prosecutor
- Lou Veloso as Miyong
- Julio Diaz as Julian Valerio
- Spanky Manikan as Estong
- Carlos Morales as Anton
- Jeric Raval as Gener Guinto
- Alessandra de Rossi as Rowena Macaraeg
- Christopher Roxas as Marcelo
- Elia Ilano as Gigi
- Dindo Arroyo as J/Dir. Guillermo Acosta
- Joseph Bitangcol as JO3 Cristobal Mendoza (Acosta's Jailguard)
- Mae Paner as Doray
- Pontri Bernardo as Danilo
- Alchris Galura as JO2 Roque (Acosta's Jailguard)
- Banjo Romero as Park Robber
- Sue Prado as Lita Escaño
- Ronnie Lazaro as Romano "Chairman" Recio
- Deborah Sun as Maria (Julian's ex-wife)
- Paul Sy as Paeng
- Jojit Lorenzo as Amado Ignacio
- Aleck Bovick as Cora Ignacio
- Long Mejia as Francisco "Paco" Alvarado
- Kristoffer King as Alwyn Recio
- Ranulfo Docdocan as Rannie
- Jelson Bay as Donato
- William Martinez as Jomar
- Jake Roxas as Daniel
- Jason Abalos as Alexis
- Maris Racal as Rona Carreon
- Sam Pinto as Isabel
- Sonny Parsons as Fidel
- Melizza Jimenez as Sally
- Ahron Villena as Drug Fish Syndicate Dealer
- Ketchup Eusebio as Drug Fish Syndicate Dealer
- Atoy Co as Drug Fish Syndicate Leader
- Daniel Fernando as Jack Chan
- Simon Ibarra as young adult Emilio Syquia
- Rochelle Barrameda as Teresa Syquia
- Anne Feo as Atty. Peralta (Don Emilio's lawyer)
- Mike Lloren as J/Dir. Benito Manlapig
- Harold Baldonado as Bolit
- Brando Legaspi as Jonard
- Bimbo Bautista as Atty. Andrew Mariano (Cardo's lawyer)
- Rolando Inocencio as Prosecutor Jason Herrera
- Jethro Ramirez as JO1 Perez (Ladronio's Jailguard)
- King Gutierrez as J/Dir. Pedro Ladronio
- Lito Legaspi as Jonathan Wu
- Joey Padilla as Joey Boy Tiocson (Wu's right-hand man)
- Nhikzy Calma as Atong
- Christian Morones as Albert Jacob
- Alma Concepcion as Bettina Jacob
- Daryl Ong as Singer at Cardo and Alyana's Wedding
- KZ Tandingan as Singer at Cardo and Alyana's wedding
- Gary Valenciano as Singer at Cardo and Alyana’s wedding

== Episodes ==
No. overall	No. in season	Title	Original air date	Kantar media rating (nationwide)
263	1	"Pighati"	October 3, 2016	39.6%
264	2	"Salungat"	October 4, 2016	37.9%
265	3	"Mensahe"	October 5, 2016	40.3%
266	4	"Pagtataka"	October 6, 2016	37.8%
267	5	"Sulat"	October 7, 2016	37.0%
268	6	"Saklolo"	October 10, 2016	38.6%
269	7	"Saksi"	October 11, 2016	40.4%
270	8	"Hidwaan"	October 12, 2016	38.6%
271	9	"Siyasat"	October 13, 2016	39.8%
272	10	"Matyag"	October 14, 2016	36.0%
273	11	"Paratang"	October 17, 2016	38.3%
274	12	"Pakana"	October 18, 2016	37.2%
275	13	"Sagupaan"	October 19, 2016	34.9%
276	14	"Dakpin"	October 20, 2016	37.2%
277	15	"Pagkaila"	October 21, 2016	36.4%
278	16	"Pipigilan"	October 24, 2016	37.3%
279	17	"Paglilitis"	October 25, 2016	37.1%
280	18	"Paghatol"	October 26, 2016	35.6%
281	19	"Parusahan"	October 27, 2016	37.1%
282	20	"Kalakaran"	October 28, 2016	34.2%
283	21	"Katapatan"	October 31, 2016	33.5%
284	22	"Alalahanin"	November 1, 2016	33.0%
285	23	"Alinlangan"	November 2, 2016	34.1%
286	24	"Ransom"	November 3, 2016	37.0%
287	25	"Rescue"	November 4, 2016	36.1%
288	26	"Paanyaya"	November 7, 2016	35.5%
289	27	"Pagplano"	November 8, 2016	35.4%
290	28	"Sabwatan"	November 9, 2016	34.9%
291	29	"Paraan"	November 10, 2016	34.8%
292	30	"Preparasyon"	November 11, 2016	34.3%
293	31	"HBD Lola Kap"	November 12, 2016	35.4%
294	32	"Biyaya"	November 15, 2016	35.2%
295	33	"Selebrasyon"	November 16, 2016	32.0%
296	34	"Paghihiganti"	November 17, 2016	33.1%
297	35	"Reputasyon"	November 18, 2016	34.5%
298	36	"Pagtatanggol"	November 21, 2016	35.5%
299	37	"Isinakdal"	November 22, 2016	37.4%
300	38	"Katunggali"	November 23, 2016	38.6%
301	39	"Inspirasyon"	November 24, 2016	37.1%
302	40	"Laban"	November 25, 2016	37.3%
303	41	"Hinagpis"	November 28, 2016	37.5%
304	42	"Kampihan"	November 29, 2016	36.9%
305	43	"Pananalig"	November 30, 2016	37.9%
306	44	"Cardo vs. Anton"	December 1, 2016	38.4%
307	45	"Karapatan"	December 2, 2016	36.5%
308	46	"Pakiusap"	December 5, 2016	37.8%
309	47	"Ipaubaya"	December 6, 2016	38.5%
310	48	"Gabi ng Paniningil"	December 7, 2016	39.9%
311	49	"Asintahin"	December 8, 2016	39.2%
312	50	"Pagdurusa"	December 9, 2016	37.7%
313	51	"Pangungulila"	December 12, 2016	36.6%
314	52	"Sakripisyo"	December 13, 2016	38.3%
315	53	"Landas"	December 14, 2016	37.8%
316	54	"Determinasyon"	December 15, 2016	36.9%
317	55	"Pagtatagpo"	December 16, 2016	36.0%
318	56	"Magkasangga"	December 19, 2016	35.6%
319	57	"Kakosa"	December 20, 2016	34.6%
320	58	"Hangarin"	December 21, 2016	34.6%
321	59	"Imbitado"	December 22, 2016	34.2%
322	60	"Christmas Party"	December 23, 2016	31.8%
323	61	"Alamin"	December 26, 2016	30.1%
324	62	"Samahan"	December 27, 2016	30.3%
325	63	"Lagot"	December 28, 2016	31.5%
326	64	"Dampot"	December 29, 2016	30.3%
327	65	"Hanap Onyok"	December 30, 2016	29.1%
328	66	"Takas"	January 2, 2017	31.9%
329	67	"Taguan"	January 3, 2017	33.9%
330	68	"Pugante"	January 4, 2017	34.8%
331	69	"Sapalaran"	January 5, 2017	36.8%
332	70	"Pagaalala"	January 6, 2017	34.8%
333	71	"Kaibigan"	January 9, 2017	37.0%
334	72	"Paalam Benny"	January 10, 2017	39.1%
335	73	"Sumpa"	January 11, 2017	40.5%
336	74	"Pabuya"	January 12, 2017	39.2%
337	75	"Raul at Palumi"	January 13, 2017	37.6%
338	76	"Langoy"	January 16, 2017	37.3%
339	77	"Sindak"	January 17, 2017	37.4%
340	78	"Sikreto"	January 18, 2017	37.6%
341	79	"Proteksyon"	January 19, 2017	37.3%
342	80	"Sanib Pwersa"	January 20, 2017	36.8%
343	81	"Kasangkot"	January 23, 2017	37.8%
344	82	"Tiwala"	January 24, 2017	39.6%
345	83	"Trahedya"	January 25, 2017	36.4%
346	84	"Pagkakataon"	January 26, 2017	38.8%
347	85	"Hugas Kamay"	January 27, 2017	38.2%
348	86	"Protektor"	January 30, 2017	37.4%
349	87	"Transaksyon"	January 31, 2017	37.7%
350	88	"Sumbong"	February 1, 2017	37.4%
351	89	"Balita"	February 2, 2017	38.5%
352	90	"Palaisipan"	February 3, 2017	37.3%
353	91	"Interes"	February 6, 2017	38.9%
354	92	"Pagtatangka"	February 7, 2017	37.7%
355	93	"Muling Pagkikita"	February 8, 2017	38.8%
356	94	"Napagkamalan"	February 9, 2017	36.2%
357	95	"Pagbabanta"	February 10, 2017	37.5%
358	96	"Pagtakpan"	February 13, 2017	37.8%
359	97	"Magkatunggali"	February 14, 2017	35.3%
360	98	"Layunin"	February 15, 2017	35.2%
361	99	"Gamitan"	February 16, 2017	36.1%
362	100	"Hinaing"	February 17, 2017	34.6%
363	101	"Raket"	February 20, 2017	36.4%
364	102	"Pasukuin"	February 21, 2017	35.5%
365	103	"Pagsubok"	February 22, 2017	38.3%
366	104	"Pag-amin"	February 23, 2017	39.2%
367	105	"Parusa"	February 24, 2017	37.7%
368	106	"Banggaan"	February 27, 2017	42.8%
369	107	"Matira Matibay"	February 28, 2017	44.6%
370	108	"Ligtas"	March 1, 2017	39.0%
371	109	"Ebidensya"	March 2, 2017	39.9%
372	110	"Pabagsakin"	March 3, 2017	37.2%
373	111	"Panganib"	March 6, 2017	40.0%
374	112	"Linlangin"	March 7, 2017	40.1%
375	113	"Komprontasyon"	March 8, 2017	40.7%
376	114	"Pinaglalaban"	March 9, 2017	41.2%
377	115	"Magkakampi"	March 10, 2017	40.4%
378	116	"Kuta"	March 13, 2017	41.3%
379	117	"Walang Kawala"	March 14, 2017	41.8%
380	118	"Tangkain"	March 15, 2017	39.4%
381	119	"Ituro"	March 16, 2017	39.5%
382	120	"Tanggi"	March 17, 2017	39.1%
383	121	"Sorpresa"	March 20, 2017	39.4%
384	122	"Kaarawan Ni Cardo"	March 21, 2017	40.8%
385	123	"Paglikas"	March 22, 2017	41.9%
386	124	"Pakikiramay"	March 23, 2017	37.8%
387	125	"Sundan"	March 24, 2017	39.5%
388	126	"Humanda"	March 27, 2017	40.2%
389	127	"Kastigo"	March 28, 2017	41.1%
390	128	"Testigo"	March 29, 2017	38.8%
391	129	"Patumbahin"	March 30, 2017	39.4%
392	130	"Habilin"	March 31, 2017	38.7%
393	131	"Sugurin"	April 1, 2017	40.7%
394	132	"Gantihan"	April 4, 2017	42.3%
395	133	"Desisyon"	April 5, 2017	40.4%
396	134	"Pagsuko"	April 6, 2017	37.2%
397	135	"Balik Bilibid"	April 7, 2017	36.5%
398	136	"Pagmanman"	April 10, 2017	36.4%
399	137	"Panalangin"	April 11, 2017	35.3%
400	138	"Kalbaryo"	April 12, 2017	32.0%
401	139	"Pagbawi"	April 17, 2017	36.4%
402	140	"Hatol"	April 18, 2017	37.9%
403	141	"Paghaharap"	April 19, 2017	37.0%
404	142	"Patakaran"	April 20, 2017	36.6%
405	143	"Paglalantad"	April 21, 2017	34.6%
406	144	"Pagbaliktad"	April 24, 2017	36.0%
407	145	"Pag Asa"	April 25, 2017	39.0%
408	146	"Testimonya"	April 26, 2017	36.1%
409	147	"Pasakit"	April 27, 2017	37.4%
410	148	"Paglaya"	April 28, 2017	35.4%
411	149	"Pagbabago"	May 1, 2017	33.6%
412	150	"Balik Serbisyo"	May 2, 2017	36.8%
413	151	"Harangin"	May 3, 2017	32.9%
414	152	"Kumpirmado"	May 4, 2017	36.7%
415	153	"Balakid"	May 5, 2017	36.1%
416	154	"Impormasyon"	May 8, 2017	37.9%
417	155	"Pinabayaan"	May 9, 2017	38.1%
418	156	"Sakote"	May 10, 2017	39.3%
419	157	"Pagbunyag"	May 11, 2017	39.4%
420	158	"Pagkabahala"	May 12, 2017	37.3%
421	159	"Salarin"	May 15, 2017	38.9%
422	160	"Pagtalikod"	May 16, 2017	38.9%
423	161	"Buwis Buhay"	May 17, 2017	41.5%
424	162	"Pagpili"	May 18, 2017	37.1%
425	163	"Kasal"	May 19, 2017	36.6%
426	164	"Singilan"	May 22, 2017	41.1%
427	165	"Huling Harapan"	May 23, 2017	43.3%
428	166	"Bagong Buhay"	May 24, 2017	42.7%

Legend
Peak Season Rating
Lowest Season Rating
