= Ang Probinsyano =

2015–22 Philippine television drama series

- Logo
- Also known as: Ang Probinsyano; Brothers
- Genre: Action drama Police procedural
- Created by: Rondel P. Lindayag
- Based on: Ang Probinsyano by Ronwaldo Reyes
- Developed by: Roldeo T. Endrinal; Julie Anne R. Benitez
- Directed by: Malu L. Sevilla; Avel E. Sunpongco; Toto Natividad; Richard V. Somes; Kevin de Vela; Alan Chanliongco; Ram Tolentino; Enzo Williams; Rodel Nacianceno; Nick Olanka; Manny Q. Palo; Darnel Joy R. Villaflor; Michael de Mesa; Albert Langitan; Emille Joson; Jeffrey Sonora; John Prats
- Creative directors: Johnny de los Santos; Dang Baldonado
- Starring: Coco Martin
- Music by: Idonnah Lopez-Villarico; Rommel Villarico; Louie Jacobe
- Opening theme: "Core Meltdown (Percussion)" by Gothic Storm (2017–2018); "Nandiyan Na si Cardo" by Randy Santiago (2018–2019); "Last Stand" by FormantX (2022)
- Country of origin: Philippines
- Original language: Filipino
- No. of seasons: 9
- No. of episodes: 1,696 (list of episodes)

Production
- Executive producers: Charo Santos-Concio; Carlo L. Katigbak; Cory V. Vidanes; Laurenti M. Dyogi; Roldeo T. Endrinal; Eileen Angela T. Garcia; Hazel Bolisay Parfan; Camille Camacho Rosales-Navarro; Roselle Beegee Soldao-Gannaban; Patricia Y. Tardecilla
- Producer: Dagang Vilbar
- Cinematography: George Tutanes; Eli Balce; Elmer Haresco Despa; Robert Flores; Romy Vitug; Joe Tutanese; Ronnie Nadura; Algin Siscar
- Editor: Froilan Francia
- Running time: 35–45 minutes (Season 1–7); 22–33 minutes (Season 8–9); 71 minutes (finale)
- Production companies: FPJ Productions; Dreamscape Entertainment Television; CCM Creatives

Original release
- Network: ABS-CBN
- Release: September 28, 2015 – March 13, 2020
- Network: Kapamilya Channel
- Release: June 15, 2020 – August 12, 2022

FPJ's Ang Probinsyano (transl. 'FPJ's The Provincial Man', international title Brothers) is a Philippine television drama action series broadcast by ABS-CBN and the Kapamilya Channel. The series is based on the 1996 Filipino film of the same title. Directed by Malu L. Sevilla, Avel E. Sunpongco, and Toto Natividad, it stars Coco Martin in the lead role.

The series aired on the network's Primetime Bida evening block and worldwide via The Filipino Channel (TFC) on September 28, 2015. The series concluded on August 12, 2022, with a total of nine seasons and 1,696 episodes. It is considered the longest-running drama series in ABS-CBN history.

== Series overview ==
Season	Episodes	Originally released		
Season	Episodes	First released	Last released	Network
1	262	September 28, 2015	September 30, 2016	ABS-CBN
2	166	October 3, 2016	May 24, 2017	ABS-CBN
3	119	May 25, 2017	November 7, 2017	ABS-CBN
4	91	November 8, 2017	March 14, 2018	ABS-CBN
5	135	March 15, 2018	September 21, 2018	ABS-CBN
6	140	September 24, 2018	April 5, 2019	ABS-CBN
7	253	April 8, 2019	June 26, 2020	ABS-CBN; Kapamilya Channel
8	278	June 29, 2020	August 20, 2021	Kapamilya Channel
9	252	August 23, 2021	August 12, 2022	Kapamilya Channel

FPJ's Ang Probinsyano is divided into five major narrative arcs, or "books", across its nine seasons:

=== The Syndicate Arc (2015–2017) ===
Spanning Seasons 1 and 2, this arc follows Cardo's assignments as a member of the Criminal Investigation and Detection Group (CIDG), tackling various criminal syndicates.

=== The Rebellion and Terrorism Arc (2017–2018) ===
Comprising Seasons 3 and 4, this arc focuses on Cardo's infiltration of the armed group Pulang Araw (transl. 'Red Sun') while serving in the Special Action Force and operating undercover under the alias Agila (transl. 'Eagle'). He later becomes part of the vigilante and leftist guerrilla group Vendetta.

=== The Political Arc (2018–2019) ===
Covering Seasons 5 and 6, this arc centres on political drama and the increasing involvement of Vendetta in national issues, including widespread corruption and abuse of power.

=== The Crime and Corruption Arc (2019–2021) ===
Beginning in Season 7, this arc marks Cardo's return to the police force as he continues to fight crime and systemic corruption. In Season 8, Lily begins consolidating her power as the First Lady while secretly heading an international drug syndicate.

=== The International Arc (2021–2022) ===
The final arc, featured in Season 9, follows Task Force Agila as they flee north after avenging the death of Audrey Mante. The Mante family leaves the country for safety, while Task Force Agila hides in a rural area. After a series of battles, reunions, and betrayals, they ally with Senate President Camilo Edades—appointed as acting president after Lily detonates a bomb killing Oscar's impostor, Mariano.

A mass uprising unfolds, and the Armed Forces of the Philippines, Presidential Security Group, and Philippine National Police storm the Palace. Though Lily initially escapes with loyal Black Ops and PSG elements, she is eventually captured and executed by Task Force Agila.

The group's final adversary, Renato Hipolito who then continues Lily's satanic and fiendish brutalities, hiding in the jungle with warlord Lucio Santanar, captures and tortures several members of Task Force Agila. In the climax, Oscar avenges the group and kills Renato. With the deaths of Renato, Lily, Arturo, and their allies, the regime of violence and corruption ends.

Despite heavy casualties, the operation is declared a Pyrrhic victory. Cardo is promoted to Police Major and decides to retire in Botolan with his family. Oscar marries Aurora, and the series ends with Cardo encountering Mara—Aurora's daughter—hinting at a new beginning.

== Cast and characters ==
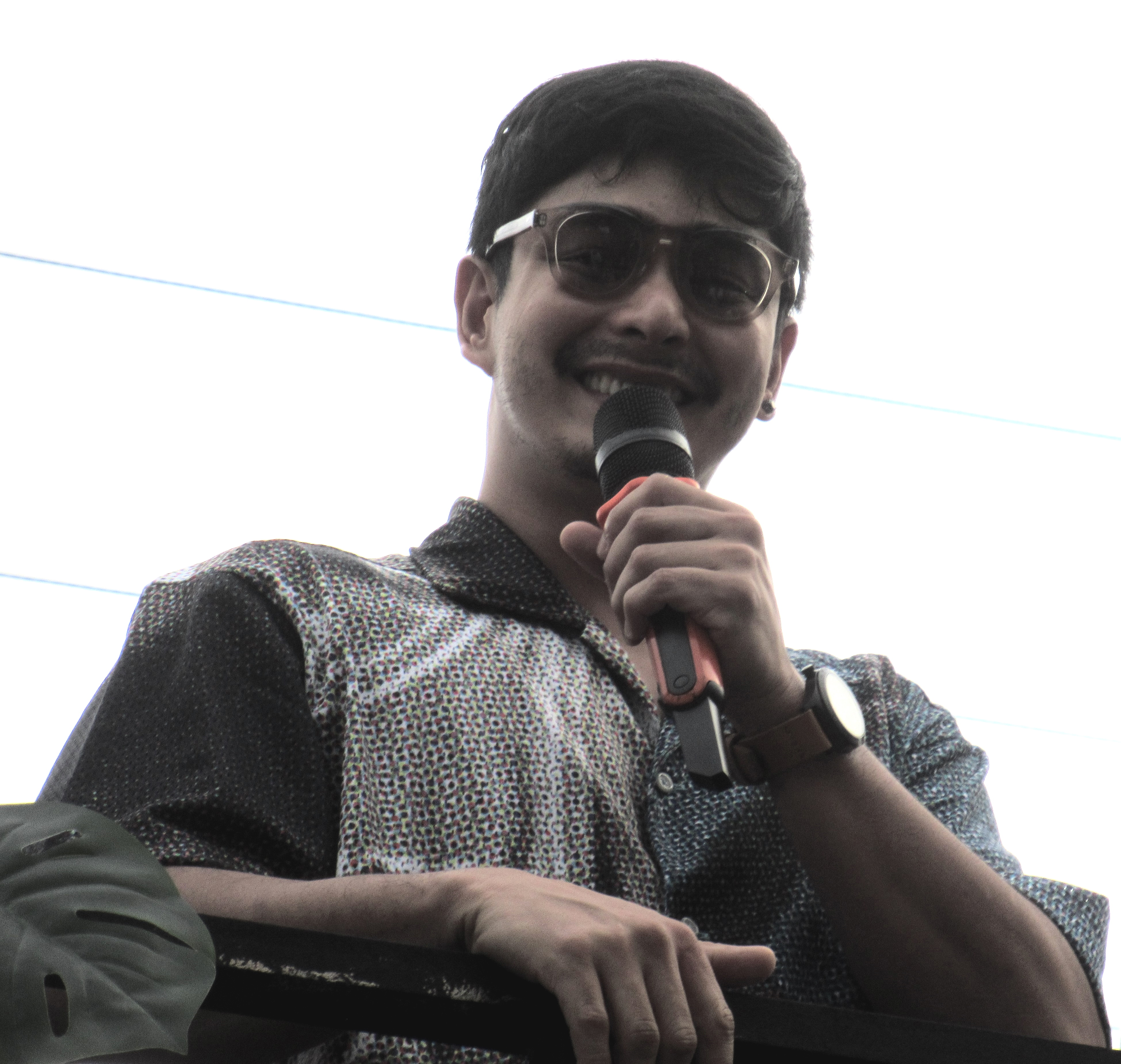
Coco Martin portrays PS/Insp. Dominador "Ador" B. de Leon and P/Maj. Ricardo "Cardo" Dalisay.

=== Final ===
==== Main ====
- Coco Martin as PS/Insp. Dominador "Ador" B. de Leon (Note: Ador died with the rank of Police Senior Inspector. When Cardo was posing as Ador, he "solved" the child trafficking case the latter left behind following his death, thus promoting "Ador" to Chief Inspector. When the ruse was revealed, the promotion was nullified.) (Note: The reason why Cardo and Ador do not share the same surname is because Cardo was put up for adoption to secure his medical treatment. Borja was the middle name used by Ador in the series, even though it was not his mother's maiden name. It may not be explicitly stated in the series but Ador used "Borja" as his middle name, the reason for such usage remains unclear. In the first episode, certificates and portraits Ador's name read as "Dominador M. de Leon", however due to continuity errors, he was introduced as "Cadet Dominador Borja de Leon" during the PNPA Graduation Ceremony, as well as in his promotion to Police Senior Inspector in the third episode. In some episodes, Ador's gravestone in the cemetery was also shown as "PS/INSP. Dominador B. de Leon".) (Note: The character's rank is based on §28, R.A. No. 6975 (Department of the Interior and Local Government Act of 1990), the law governing police ranks at the time the character appeared on and/or exited from the show.) and P/Maj. Ricardo "Cardo" Dalisay (Note: "Paloma Picache" is one of Cardo's disguises and is not a separate character. Cardo used the disguise twice to infiltrate various crime organizations. First being used to penetrate Madam Olga's White Slavery racket and then later, Ella's crime family.) (Note: Other than Paloma Picache, Cardo has also used various aliases throughout the series. He used the name Arthur Rosales, to pose as a buyer of the human organs illegally harvested by Dr. Ivan Gomez (Eric Quizon); Rico, while on the run with Trina Trinidad (Anne Curtis) from Scarface Dimayuga (Nonie Buencamino) and his men; Edward, when he infiltrated the Party Drug ring of Jonas Paulino (Jake Cuenca); Boy, when on behalf of Benny, he posed as Marie's (Meg Imperial) secret admirer; Caloy, when he infiltrated Atong's (Emilio Garcia) illegal dog fighting club; Raul, whilst wearing reggae garb, in order to safely board a ferry bound for Cebu; Miguel, when he was a fugitive from the New Bilibid Prison and both hiding and undercover in Cebu; and Fernan, later adding the nom de guerre Agila, during his time undercover as part of Pulang Araw. Originally, Fernan was meant to be "Elmer" as it was one of the names we can hear Cardo introduce himself with to Romulo Dumaguit upon regaining consciousness. This, however was later changed to Fernan in succeeding episodes.) (Note: The character's rank is based on R.A. No. 11200, the current law prescribing police ranks in the Philippines)
- John Arcilla as Renato "Buwitre" Hipolito
- Angel Aquino as MGen. Diana T. Olegario (Note: While General Olegario was married to Romulo Dumaguit in the show's sixth season, she continued to carry the last name of her first husband. "Olegario" is the last name of her deceased prior spouse and not her maiden name as evidenced by the fact that her son Joel (Marco Gumabao) carried the last name Olegario.) (Note: Task Force Agila members who died during the mission to capture Renato and allies are posthumously promoted by President Hidalgo for their acts of heroism.)
- Geoff Eigenmann as P/Maj. Albert De Vela
- John Prats as P/Cpt. Jerome Girona Jr.
- Lorna Tolentino as First Lady Lily Ann Cortez-Hidalgo
- Malou Crisologo as Yolanda "Yolly" Capuyao-Santos
- Michael de Mesa as P/Cpl. Ramil "Manager" D. Taduran
- Raymart Santiago as P/LtCol. Victor A. Basco
- Rowell Santiago as President Oscar Hidalgo and Mariano Patag (Note: President Hidalgo's body double employed in order to make sure a succession in the office does not occur despite the real Hidalgo's absence.)
- Shaina Magdayao as P/LtCol. Roxanne Opeña

==== Supporting ====
- Lordivino "Bassilyo" Ignacio as P/Cpl. Dante "Bulate" Villafuerte
- CJ Ramos as P/Cpl. Patrick Espinosa
- Dax Augustus as Augustus
- Jay Gonzaga as LtCol. James Cordero
- John Medina as P/Maj. Avel "Billy" M. Guzman
- Marc Solis as PS/MSgt. Rigor Soriano
- Nonong Ballinan as Presidential Aide-De-Camp Ambrocio "Ambo" Honorio
- Sancho delas Alas as P/Cpl. Gregorio "Greco" Cortez
- Bryan "Smugglaz" Lao as P/Cpl. Marsial "Butete" Matero
- Whitney Tyson as Elizabeth

==== Recurring ====
- Marvin Yap as Elmo Santos
- PJ Endrinal as Wally Nieves
- Bianca Manalo as Lourdes "Bubbles" Torres
- Lester Llansang as P/Cpt. Mark Vargas
- Arlene Tolibas as Marikit Flores
- Daria Ramirez as Auring
- Arlene Muhlach as Loring
- Ella Cruz as Lisa
- Jobert "Kuya Jobert" Austria as Pat. George "Wangbu" Espinosa
- Hyubs Azarcon as P/MSgt. Rolando "Lando" Reyes
- Nico Antonio as Jacinto "Intoy" Santos
- Lorenzo Mara as Ruben
- Rhed Bustamante as Ana
- Kenken Nuyad as Aye
- Donna Cariaga as Doray Mendoza
- Joven Olvido as Carlo "Caloy" Mendoza
- Ghersie Fantastico as Itong
- Ferdinand "Prinsipe Makata" Clemente as Mot
- Mark Manicad as P/Cpt. Edwin Salonga
- Onyok Pineda as Honorio "Onyok" Amaba
- James "Paquito" Sagarino as Paquito Alvarado
- Rhian "Dang" Ramos as Amanda "Dang" Ignacio
- Shantel Crislyn Layh "Ligaya" Ngujo as Ligaya Dungalo
- Enzo Pelojero as Dexter Flores
- Iyannah Sumalpong as Kristelle "Letlet" Sandoval

=== Former ===
==== Main ====
- Jaime Fabregas as P/LtGen. Delfin S. Borja (Note: Delfin Borja retired from the PNP with the rank of Police Major General (P/MGen) under R.A. No. 11200, its equivalent rank under R.A. No. 6975 being Police Director.) (Note: Delfin died with the rank of Police Major General (P/MGen). When Task Force Agila were reinstated, President Hidalgo awarded Delfin posthumous promotion to Police Lieutenant General (P/LtGen) for his acts of heroism.)
- Maja Salvador as SPO1 Glenda "Glen" F. Corpuz
- Agot Isidro as Verna Syquia-Tuazon
- Bela Padilla as Carmen M. Guzman (Note: Bela Padilla's character Carmen M. Guzman was twice married during her run in the series, once to Dominador "Ador" B. De Leon, and after the latter's death, to Joaquin S. Tuazon.)
- Arjo Atayde as PC/Insp. Joaquin S. Tuazon
- Albert Martinez as Tomas "Papa Tom" G. Tuazon
- Yassi Pressman as Kapitana Alyana R. Arevalo-Dalisay
- Joel Torre as Teodoro "Teddy" Arevalo (Note: Teddy Arevalo used pen names while writing against the government and exposing its corruption. Against Lucas Cabrera's administration in Season 6, Teddy used the name Juan Verdad. He also used the name Jose Malaya in his exposés against Lily and her allies in Season 7.)
- Shamaine Centenera-Buencamino as Virginia "Virgie" R. Arevalo
- Edu Manzano as President Lucas Cabrera (Note: Lucas Cabrera was written off the show as the sitting President of the Republic of the Philippines, hence he is still credited as President)
- Jhong Hilario as Homer "Alakdan" Adlawan
- Sid Lucero as Maj. Manolo "Nolo" Catindig
- Mark Anthony Fernandez as Brandon Cabrera
- Pokwang as Amor Nieves
- JC Santos (Note: JC Santos also previously guested as the teenage Emilio Syquia in flashbacks.) as Marco Cabrera
- Jolo Revilla as PSG Commander Harold Casilag
- Francis Magundayao as Yohan Hidalgo
- Bobby Andrews as Special Assistant to the President William Celerio
- Ryza Cenon as Aubrey Hidalgo
- Dawn Zulueta as First Lady Marissa Hidalgo (Note: Marissa Hidalgo was written off the show as the First Lady of the Philippines, hence she is credited as such)
- Alice Dixson Second Lady as Catherine V. Cabrera (Note: Catherine Cabrera left the show before Lucas Cabrera's ascencion to the Presidency, thus she is still billed as the second lady because the title was never explicitly used by the character on the show.)
- Tirso Cruz III Atty. Arturo "Art" M. Padua
- Marc Abaya as Jacob Serrano
- Ara Mina as Ellen Padua

Very Special Participation

- Lito Lapid as Romulo "Leon" Dumaguit

Very Special Role

- Susan Roces as Flora "Lola Flora" S. Borja-de Leon
- Eddie Garcia as Don Emilio Syquia/Señor Gustavo Torralba (Note: Emilio Syquia began using the alias Gustavo Torralba after surviving his near fatal encounter with Vendetta. Under this guise, Torralba presents himself as a Colombian businessman; moreover he has shifted his business interest to illegal mining.)
  - JC Santos as young Emilio

==== Supporting ====
- Joey Marquez as Nanding Corpuz
- Malou de Guzman as Lolit Fajardo-Corpuz
- Mitch Valdes as Konsehala Gina Magtanggol (Note: Gina Magtanggol was written off the show as a sitting Manila City Councilor awaiting trial as principal for the complex crime of unintentional abortion with double frustrated murder, hence she is still listed under her title as City Councilor.)
- Eda Nolan as Brenda F. Corpuz
- Belle Mariano as Rachel S. Tuazon
- Beverly Salviejo as Yaya Cita Roque
- Pepe Herrera as Benjamin "Benny" Dimaapi
- Art Acuña as PS/Supt. Roy Carreon
- Michael Roy Jornales as P/Cpt. Francisco "Chikoy" Rivera
- Marc Acueza as PS/Insp. Bernardino "Dino" Robles
- Rino Marco as PS/Insp. Gregorio "Greg" Sebastian
- Ping Medina as Diego Sahagun
- Mhyco Aquino as Lorenz Gabriel
- Lander Vera Perez as Alfred Borromeo
- Gary Lim as Gaspar Romero
- McCoy de Leon as Juan Pablo "JP" R. Arevalo
- Juliana Parizcova Segovia as Francisco/Francine
- Roy "Shernan" Gaite as Gido
- Pedro "Zaito" Canon Jr. as Nick
- David Minemoto as David
- Maika Rivera as Cassandra Jose

Introducing

- Heart Ramos as Mary Grace "Gracie" Hidalgo
- McNeal "Awra" Briguela as Macario "Makmak" Samonte Jr.

Recurring

- Lei Andrei Navarro as Dominador "Junior" G. de Leon Jr.
- Dennis Padilla as Edgar Guzman
- Ana Roces as Leonora "Nora" Montano-Guzman
- Brace Arquiza as Ryan M. Guzman
- Elisse Joson as Lorraine Pedrosa
- Kiray Celis as Mitch
- Daisy Reyes as Belen Girona
- Jeffrey Tam as Otep
- Benj Manalo as Felipe "Pinggoy" Tanyag Jr.
- Long Mejia as Francisco "Paco" Alvarado
- Al Vaughn Chier Tuliao as Ricardo "Ricky Boy" A. Dalisay Jr.
- Tart Carlos as Juanita "J.Lo" Burton
- Xia Vigor as Keana Burton

== Production ==
=== Pre-production ===
Coco Martin was initially set to star in a different television project based on his experiences as an overseas Filipino worker (OFW) in Canada. This concept was originally intended to be a film featuring Martin and Nora Aunor, but the latter declined the offer. The project eventually materialised in 2016 as the film Padre de Familia. Martin would later revisit the concept in his 2022 Metro Manila Film Festival entry Labyu with an Accent.

With the original film project's future uncertain at the time, the concept was reworked into a television series. This required changes, including a new female lead. Judy Ann Santos was initially approached to star opposite Martin but declined due to her pregnancy. Sarah Geronimo was also considered for the role but likewise declined. Subsequently, Martin proposed the idea of adapting Ang Probinsyano.

Interestingly, Martin's abandoned concept premiered the same year as On the Wings of Love, starring James Reid and Nadine Lustre.

The production of On the Wings of Love was affected by the development of Ang Probinsyano. Actor Arjo Atayde was originally cast to portray the character Jiggs and had already undergone a look test. However, he was later reassigned to play Joaquin Tuazon in Ang Probinsyano. The role of Jiggs was eventually given to Albie Casiño.

=== Concept ===
Following Coco Martin's portrayal of PS/Insp. Garry Eraña in the Maalaala Mo Kaya episode "Plano", which served as a tribute to the fallen SAF 44, ABS-CBN President and CEO Charo Santos-Concio proposed the idea of an action drama series that would highlight the police force and help them "regain the love and respect of the people." Martin, who was later confirmed as the lead actor, was actively involved in pre-production and suggested adapting Ang Probinsyano into a television series.

When asked about his decision to adapt Ang Probinsyano, Martin stated that he and his grandmother were avid fans of Fernando Poe Jr.'s films while he was growing up. The production received the blessing of Poe's widow, veteran actress Susan Roces, to proceed with the adaptation.

Contrary to popular belief, Ang Probinsyano was not a direct remake of the 1997 film of the same title. The series was designed for long-form storytelling, allowing it to run for several months to better suit television audiences.

The title of the original film was inspired by the colloquial term pulis patola, which is sometimes used to jestingly refer to rookie police officers. As patola (a type of gourd from the genus Luffa) is typically grown in rural areas, the film was given the title Ang Probinsyano, referring to a provincial policeman.

A special tribute screening of the original film was held on August 20, 2015, to commemorate what would have been Fernando Poe Jr.'s 76th birthday, and to promote the upcoming television adaptation. The screening was attended by members of the series cast, including Coco Martin, Susan Roces, Maja Salvador, Bela Padilla, Beverly Salviejo, and Jaime Fàbregas, who had also served as the film's musical director.

The series' first trailer was released on September 4, 2015.

=== Themes ===
The series explores a range of themes, including resilience, bravery, familial bonds, self-sacrifice, unconditional love, vengeance, and the pursuit of justice. It frequently portrays individuals who are willing to face mortal danger to protect their loved ones or uphold moral principles.

Ang Probinsyano also reflects on pressing social issues in the Philippines, such as drug trafficking, political corruption, prostitution, human trafficking, organised crime, and worsening poverty. As the series progresses, it transitions into broader socio-political concerns, including government corruption, nepotism, business malpractice, social injustice, human rights violations, political assassinations, bureaucratic inefficiency, terrorism, authoritarianism, and warlordism.

In response to these issues, the narrative presents forms of resistance such as community mobilisation, class struggle, guerrilla warfare, and democratic advocacy. The series often underscores opposition to oppressive systems and criticises what is portrayed as the entrenched dominance of political and economic elites.

=== Casting ===
The adaptation was officially announced on May 18, 2015. The event was attended by ABS-CBN President and CEO Charo Santos-Concio, along with cast members Coco Martin, Susan Roces, Albert Martinez, Angeline Quinto, and Bela Padilla.

To prepare for his role, Coco Martin, along with other cast members, underwent police training. Martin also attended Philippine National Police (PNP) flag-raising ceremonies to further immerse himself in the role. He trained in various martial arts and weapons handling, and performed most of his own stunts. Martin also served as the show's creative consultant and later became one of its directors.

Singer-actress Angeline Quinto was initially cast as Lily, an original character, but was later removed from the cast. Maja Salvador, who portrayed SPO1 Glenda "Glen" Corpuz, replaced her. Salvador had previously worked with Martin in the 2011 drama Minsan Lang Kita Iibigin.

In April 2016, Bela Padilla was written out of the series. She revealed that her role was originally intended to last only for the first eight weeks, but her stay was extended. Her character made brief returns in Cardo's dreams, urging him to seek justice for her death.

Veteran actor Eddie Garcia's character was first teased in the April 7, 2016 episode, during the funeral of Padilla's character. In the following episode, Garcia was introduced as Don Emilio Syquia. Between late 2016 and February 2017, Garcia was temporarily absent from the series as he was recovering from a car accident. Towards the end of Season 4, his character was seemingly killed off in a confrontation with Cardo Dalisay, but his fate was left ambiguous to allow for a potential return. Garcia sat out the entire fifth season, but reappeared in the sixth as Señor Gustavo Torralba, whose criminal operations included illegal mining and forced labour. The character met a definitive end after another encounter with Cardo nearly three years later. Ang Probinsyano was Garcia's final television project before his passing on June 20, 2019.

In August 2016, Maja Salvador exited the series following the expiration of her contract. Rumours of her return persisted in the years that followed. She was replaced by Yassi Pressman, who played Alyana Arevalo, Cardo's new love interest.

In January 2017, Pepe Herrera, who played Cardo's sidekick, left the show after migrating to New Zealand with his family.

To mark the beginning of a new story arc, new cast members were introduced, including Lito Lapid, Mark Lapid, Angel Aquino, John Arcilla, Jhong Hilario, Sid Lucero, Ronwaldo Martin, and Mitch Valdes.

In May 2017, child actor Simon Pineda exited the series.

In November 2017, Angeline Quinto made a guest appearance as Regine, a role she played until early February 2018.

In March 2018, it was announced that Rowell Santiago, Edu Manzano, Dawn Zulueta, and Alice Dixson would join the cast. Santiago returned to the role of the President, which he had previously portrayed in Tanging Yaman (2010). Manzano played Vice President Lucas Cabrera, while Zulueta and Dixson portrayed First Lady Marissa Hidalgo and Second Lady Catherine Cabrera, respectively. They were joined by JC Santos, who had earlier appeared as the young Emilio Syquia, as Marco Cabrera, and Mark Anthony Fernandez as Congressman Brandon Cabrera.

On April 17, 2018, Dreamscape Ad Prom Head Eric John Salut announced on Instagram that Ryza Cenon, who had recently transferred from rival network GMA, would join the cast as a member of the First Family. She was joined by Francis Magundayao and Heart Ramos. On the same day, it was revealed that Jolo Revilla would also join the series.

In January 2019, Ryza Cenon left the show.

In February 2019, it was reported that Lorna Tolentino would appear in Season 6. On March 11, 2019, she debuted as Lily Ann Cortez, a political operator who manipulated President Cabrera to further her own interests. Originally intended to appear for only a month, her role was continuously extended, eventually becoming one of the main antagonists of the series.

Between February and March 2019, cast members Lito Lapid, Jhong Hilario, Mark Lapid, and Edu Manzano took temporary leaves from the series to run in the 2019 midterm elections.

On September 13, 2019, Coco Martin confirmed that negotiations were underway to include Hollywood actors in the series. However, the plan was eventually shelved due to the COVID-19 pandemic.

=== Broadcast ===
The series aired on weekdays through ABS-CBN's Primetime Bida block and was also broadcast internationally via The Filipino Channel (TFC).

In 2019, the series was acquired by Netflix, which streamed its first season under the international title Brothers.

On March 16, 2020, the series was placed on hiatus due to ABS-CBN's temporary programming adjustments in response to the enhanced community quarantine and production halt brought about by the COVID-19 pandemic. During the hiatus, reruns of the show's first chapter aired on Jeepney TV under the title FPJ's Ang Probinsyano: Ang Simula.

Amid uncertainties following ABS-CBN's franchise expiration and a cease and desist order issued by the National Telecommunications Commission (NTC), ABS-CBN announced on June 4, 2020, that the series would resume airing on cable and satellite platforms through the Kapamilya Channel, Cine Mo!, and TV Plus. A special 10-episode recap aired during the first two weeks, with new episodes beginning on June 29, 2020. On June 15, 2020, the series was officially relaunched under the tagline Tuloy ang Laban, coinciding with the resumption of production activities.

Due to health and safety protocols, the production implemented a five-week lock-in taping setup, during which veteran actress Susan Roces opted not to return on-site. The production team arranged for her to film her scenes remotely from home. This was incorporated into the storyline by having her character go into hiding, separate from Cardo.

Following the recap episodes, the series' eighth season premiered on June 29, 2020. The premiere was livestreamed via Facebook, Twitter, and YouTube. Beginning July 14, 2020, Ang Probinsyano started regular livestreams on YouTube, with its debut stream reaching 56,000 live viewers.

On October 10, 2020, the show returned to free TV through A2Z Channel 11, operated by the ZOE Broadcasting Network in partnership with ABS-CBN. It later resumed airing on TV5, operated by MediaQuest Holdings, on March 8, 2021.

On June 29, 2021, Dreamscape Entertainment announced that the series would begin airing in 41 African countries through the StarTimes PTV regional network.

=== Extension ===
FPJ's Ang Probinsyano was initially scheduled to air until July 2016, but the series was extended due to its high ratings, engaging action sequences, and its portrayal of real-life lessons that resonated with viewers. The series also aimed to educate the public on Philippine laws and social issues.

To commemorate its first anniversary, a sold-out concert titled FPJ's Ang Probinsyano: Isang Pamilya Tayo – The Anniversary Concert was held on October 8, 2016, at the Smart Araneta Coliseum. The event was also made available via pay-per-view through Sky On Demand.

On April 21, 2017, ABS-CBN announced that the action drama series would be extended until January 2018. In August 2017, the series marked its 100th week on air.

Due to its continued strong viewership, the series was extended once again, first until June 2018 and later through September 2018 in celebration of its third anniversary. The anniversary was commemorated on the September 23, 2018 episode of ASAP.

On July 4, 2018, ABS-CBN's Head of Corporate Communications, Kane Errol Choa, confirmed that the series had been granted an indefinite extension.

On August 8, 2019, Ang Probinsyano aired its 1,000th episode, which was celebrated by the cast and crew on set. The fourth anniversary of the show was celebrated on December 8, 2019, on ASAP Natin 'To.

On July 22, 2022, lead actor and producer Coco Martin announced that the series would conclude on August 12, 2022, to make way for the premiere of the 2022 remake of Darna.

=== Marketing ===
To promote the series, ABS-CBN launched various tie-in merchandise, which included school supplies, apparel, and toys. The network partnered with Asian Stationery to distribute these items under its Licensed Characters brand, which featured Ang Probinsyano among other titles.

In 2017, an endless runner mobile game based on the series was released. Developed by Xeleb Technologies, the game recorded 50,000 downloads within the first five minutes of its launch and was nearing one million downloads by August 2017.

Ang Probinsyano also served as the theme for several promotional attractions. These included Misyon: Ang Probinsyano, a 4D interactive theatre game offered at ABS-CBN Studio XP, which was based on the traditional Filipino game patintero. Another related attraction was FPJ's Ang Probinsyano: The Escape Room, a collaborative project between ABS-CBN and Left Behind PH, featuring puzzles and tasks inspired by the show.

=== Connections to the film ===
The television series FPJ's Ang Probinsyano both follows and deviates from the storyline of the original 1997 film starring Fernando Poe Jr. Several changes were made to adapt the story to a long-running television format, while preserving key themes and characters.

Connections and deviations
Film	Series
Cardo (Kardo) had a wife and children, who were murdered after he was mistaken for his twin brother Ador.	Cardo has no family at the beginning of the series.
The separation of the twins was due to Ador's guilt.	Cardo was adopted by a childless couple as a condition for receiving medical treatment in Singapore following an accident.
Ador and Kardo did not have a grandmother.	The twins have a grandmother, played by veteran actress Susan Roces, widow of Fernando Poe Jr.
Kardo's surname is de Leon.	Cardo's surname is Dalisay.
Kardo is the police chief of Santa Marcela.	Cardo is a SAF trooper from Botolan.
The main antagonist is a drug syndicate.	The primary antagonist is a human and child trafficking syndicate that later expands into drug production and distribution.
The child Kardo adopts is a girl.	Cardo adopts a boy, later expanding his family by adopting five more children.
Ador's son is named Jerry.	Cardo names his adopted son after him.
Carmen is a love interest, nightclub entertainer, and mother of the adopted child.	Carmen is Ador's widow.
Carmen's surname is Salazar.	Her maiden name is Guzman, before marrying Ador.
Corpuz is not a character.	Glen Corpuz is introduced as a supporting character.
Ador's superior, who instructs Kardo to assume Ador's identity, is not related to them.	In the series, their superior is portrayed as their grand-uncle.
Ador is killed by a syndicate henchman.	Ador is murdered by the main antagonist, a corrupt police officer.
The main villain is a corrupt police official under the payroll of the drug syndicate.	The antagonist is a corrupt officer who is also a leader and family member of the trafficking and drug syndicate.
No "Paloma Picache" character.	A storyline features Paloma Picache, Cardo's undercover persona in drag. Coco Martin proposed the character, who appears during a mission to rescue kidnapped women from a prostitution syndicate. Martin studied female mannerisms for the role and remarked that portraying Paloma was physically demanding, especially due to high heels and extensive makeup preparation. Cardo's "Paloma" persona also appeared in a storyline involving the blackmailing case of an American businessman.
Janus del Prado, Tom Olivar, Dindo Arroyo, and Joey Padilla appeared in the film. These actors made guest appearances in the TV adaptation. Additionally, Daniel Fernando, Ricardo Cepeda, and Jethro Ramirez—who were part of the 1998 sequel Pagbabalik ng Probinsyano—also appeared in the series.	Jaime Fàbregas, who played a lead role in the series, served as the musical director for both the original film and its sequel. Manny Q. Palo, one of the series' directors, was credited for writing the screenplay of the sequel.

== Soundtrack ==
FPJ's Ang Probinsyano: The Official Soundtrack

Soundtrack album by Various Artists
- Released: October 8, 2016
- Genre: Contemporary R&B, Manila Sound, hip hop, pop rock
- Length: 34:55
- Label: Star Music
- Producer: Jonathan Manalo

No.	Title	Writer(s)	Artist(s)	Length
1.	"'Wag Ka Nang Umiyak"	Ebe Dancel	Gary Valenciano	5:11
2.	"Basta't Kasama Kita"	Greg Caro	Daryl Ong	4:30
3.	"Ang Probinsyano"	Aristotle Pollisco	Gloc-9 feat. Ebe Dancel	3:03
4.	"Isang Pamilya Tayo"	Gabriel Tagadtad, Robert Labayen, Lloyd Oliver Corpuz, Thyro Alfaro and Yumi Lacsamana	Unit 406 feat. Yeng Constantino	4:00
5.	"Kembot"	Marcus Davis	McNeal "Awra" Briguela	3:33
6.	"Don Romantiko"	Christian Martinez	Pepe Herrera	3:22
7.	"Tatlong Bibe"		Simon Pineda	1:09
8.	"Ako si Superman"	Rey Valera	Coco Martin	3:29
9.	"'Wag Ka Nang Umiyak" (2015)	Ebe Dancel	KZ Tandingan	5:00
10.	"Tatlong Bibe" (Christmas Remix)		Simon Pineda	1:38
Total length:				34:55

Other songs
Title	Singer	Remarks	Source
Wag Ka Nang Umiyak	Gary Valenciano	Part of FPJ's Ang Probinsyano: The Official Soundtrack album. Also part of the Dreamscape Televisions of Love: Volume One album.	
Wag Ka Nang Umiyak (2015)	KZ Tandingan	Part of FPJ's Ang Probinsyano: The Official Soundtrack album as a bonus track. Also part of the Dreamscape Televisions of Love: Volume One album as a bonus track.	
Wag Ka Nang Umiyak	KZ Tandingan and Ebe Dancel		
Wag Ka Nang Umiyak	Sugarfree		
Ang Probinsyano	Gloc-9 feat. Ebe Dancel	Part of FPJ's Ang Probinsyano: The Official Soundtrack album.	
Basta't Kasama Kita	Daryl Ong	Part of FPJ's Ang Probinsyano: The Official Soundtrack album; also part of the Dreamscape Televisions of Love: Volume One album.	
Basta't Kasama Kita	Coco Martin and Maja Salvador	Part of the Dreamscape Televisions of Love: Volume One album as a bonus track.	
Ako si Superman	Jovit Baldivino	Coco Martin's cover version is part of FPJ's Ang Probinsyano: The Official Soundtrack album.	
Ako si Superman	Coco Martin	Part of FPJ's Ang Probinsyano: The Official Soundtrack album.	
Kembot	McNeal "Awra" Briguela	Part of FPJ's Ang Probinsyano: The Official Soundtrack album.	
Tatlong Bibe	Onyok Pineda	Part of FPJ's Ang Probinsyano: The Official Soundtrack album. A Christmas Remix version was also included as a bonus track.	
Don Romantiko	Pepe Herrera	Part of FPJ's Ang Probinsyano: The Official Soundtrack album.	
Akin Ka Na Lang	Morissette		
Kung Ako Na Lang Sana	Bituin Escalante		
Oh Babe	Jeremiah		
Kaba	Tootsie Guevara		
Totoy Bibo	Vhong Navarro		
Boom Karaka-raka	Vice Ganda		
Bomba	Zeus Collins feat. KZ Tandingan and Curse & Bless		
Basang-Basa sa Ulan	Aegis		
Ngayon Hanggang Wakas	Daryl Ong		
Ikaw	Daryl Ong		
Isang Pamilya Tayo	Unit 406 feat. Yeng Constantino	Part of FPJ's Ang Probinsyano: The Official Soundtrack album.	
Wag Ka Nang Umiyak (original version)	Sugarfree		
Wag Ka Nang Umiyak (duet version)	KZ Tandingan and Ebe Dancel		
Ano'ng Nangyari sa Ating Dalawa	Gary Valenciano		
Ano'ng Nangyari sa Ating Dalawa	Moira Dela Torre		
Nandito na ang Vendetta	Smugglaz and Bassilyo		
Mahal Pa Rin Kita	Rockstar		
Pagbigyang Muli	Erik Santos		
Pagbigyang Muli	Erik Santos feat. Regine Velasquez-Alcasid		
Nandiyan Na si Cardo	Randy Santiago	Used for the opening sequence since October 2018 until December 2019. The full version was released in April 2021.	
Ililigtas Ka Niya	Gary Valenciano	Replaced 'Wag ka nang Umiyak as the show's main theme beginning in Season 5.	
Dagit ng Agila	Rockwell Vallejo		
Kunin Mo Na Ang Lahat Sa Akin	Gary Valenciano		
Yun Ka	Lian Kyla		
Cardo Dalisay	Arnel Pineda	Theme song since 2021, but was originally used and sang by an unknown artist in its comeback trailer.	
'Di Ka Nag-iisa	Regine Velasquez-Alcasid	Used for Season 9.	

== Ratings ==
FPJ's Ang Probinsyano is considered one of the most-watched television series in the Philippines. It holds the record for the highest-rated pilot episode of any series since the country switched to the switched to nationwide TV ratings system in 2009, registering a 41.6% rating on September 28, 2015. It also achieved the second highest-rated in the country's television, recording a 47.2% rating on October 4, 2018, after 2009–2013's May Bukas Pa.

Kantar Media National TV Ratings (7:45PM to 8:30PM PST)
Pilot Episode	Finale Episode	Peak	Average
41.6% September 28, 2015	16.6% August 12, 2022	47.2% October 4, 2018	N/A

=== Finale reception ===
After a seven-year run on both television and digital platforms, the series drew an all-time high of more than 536,543 concurrent viewers on YouTube during its finale. It also dominated Twitter's trending list, with hashtags such as #FPJsAngProbinsyano and #FPJAP7MissionAccomplished alternately occupying the top spot.

The series finale on August 12, 2022, achieved a 16.6% average household rating, topping the national ratings chart. It marked the highest television rating for any ABS-CBN-produced series finale since the network's free-to-air shutdown in 2020 during the COVID-19 pandemic. It was also the highest rating for any non-sports primetime telecast on TV5 since the network began airing ABS-CBN programmes through a blocktime agreement.

== Controversies ==
=== "Girl in the Rain" episode ===
On July 29, 2016, the Movie and Television Review and Classification Board (MTRCB) issued a summons to FPJ's Ang Probinsyano over a scene in its July 25, 2016 episode, citing "sexually suggestive themes". The scene in question featured Ella (Vice Ganda) struggling to change a flat tire in the rain when Cardo stopped to assist. The dialogue between the characters allegedly contained double entendres.

The MTRCB noted that although the episode carried a Strong Parental Guidance (SPG) rating, in accordance with MTRCB Memorandum Circular No. 12-2011, it lacked the appropriate descriptor "SEX" despite containing what may be considered "sexually suggestive" shots.

A conference was held on August 2, 2016, attended by director Malu Sevilla, executive producer Eileen Garcia, producer Dagang Vilbar, network MTRCB coordinator Elaine Songco, and episode writer John Joseph Tuason. MTRCB Chairman Eugenio Villareal stated that the production team expressed they had no intention to offend and acknowledged the need for greater sensitivity, especially towards women and younger audiences.

Villareal also noted the show's commitment to "self-regulatory resolution" to avoid objectification and to depict scenes that uphold the "dignity of the human person".

=== Mt. Arayat as a rebel stronghold ===
Originally, Pulang Araw held camp at Mt. Arayat until it was raided by SAF troopers, forcing the group to escape to the fictional Mt. Karagao.

Behind the scenes, the show began removing references to the Municipality of Arayat, Pampanga, starting with its July 18, 2017 episode. Despite this, on July 21, 2017, the Municipal Council of Arayat forwarded a resolution to the Provincial Board demanding that the show's producers apologise for depicting Arayat "as a haven and breeding ground for terrorists and hoodlums". The resolution also called for "a hearing and to make ABS-CBN apologise for the wrong impressions it created and to correct these in the long-running teleserye". The Municipality of Arayat even contemplated filing charges of libel against ABS-CBN for the show's "damaging" portrayal of the town.

The show's producers explained that Arayat was only used nominally and that no scenes were actually shot there. They clarified that there was no intention to portray Arayat negatively, and that a disclaimer was issued at the start of each episode stating that the characters, incidents, and organisations depicted were purely fictitious. ABS-CBN subsequently issued an apology to the Municipality.

Mayor Emmanuel Alejandrino directed criticism at former Pampanga Governors Mark Lapid and Lito Lapid for their involvement. Coco Martin, the series lead, is a native of Pampanga, hailing from San Fernando.

Alejandrino further explained that the show's storyline was a sensitive topic in Arayat, which had been a bastion for socialist and communist movements up until the 1990s.

=== Usage of Dingdong Dantes and Marian Rivera's family photos ===
The show's production team was called out online by fans of celebrity couple Dingdong Dantes and Marian Rivera over the allegedly unauthorized use of their family photos. The controversy began gaining traction when a fan site dedicated to their daughter Zia, ZiaDantesFanSite, posted a video with the caption:

"Zia's photo was unethically used by Ang Probinsyano in November 2017. In last night's episode, [Dingdong and Marian] DongYan's photo was edited and used again by the show. Were the photos of Dingdong, Marian and Zia used [and] edited without permission? Dear Ang Probinsyano, strike two na po kayo ah."

The post was widely shared, which likely brought the matter to Dantes' attention.

Dantes then posted his response to the controversy:

"Courtesy and fair practice must always be observed, especially in an established industry like ours. But whether or not it is done within the entertainment sector, we should always be reminded of the basic etiquette for online photo use and sharing that includes asking permission and/or citing sources. I do hope that this won't happen again to anyone."

In the same post, Dantes shared an excerpt from a letter he sent to the production team dated August 11, 2018, which read:

"I appreciate that you found artistic inspiration from the original photos. Unfortunately, there is the inescapable consequence that legal and moral rights were violated here. And as you may very well be aware, established industry practice is against such an act as it amounts to disrespect. Worst of all, as a father and husband, I cannot help but feel offended and deeply hurt by such actions, which happened not just once, but twice. Basic rules of courtesy in this case dictate that you first secure permission from the photographer and my family."

On August 14, 2018, the production team released a statement apologising to Dantes and his family. The statement explained that a third-party contractor had been hired to create the props, and the production team was neither aware that the photos belonged to Dantes nor intended any disrespect or offense.

The producers also stated that they had launched an investigation "to prevent a similar incident from happening in the future." Actress Alice Dixson likewise offered her apology to Dantes.

=== Negative portrayal of the PNP ===
==== Portraying members of the PNP as scalawags ====
Numerous statements from the PNP, DILG, and other agencies criticised the show's portrayal of government agencies, particularly the Philippine National Police (PNP), as part of Chapter 3 (Political Arc).

PNP Chief Oscar Albayalde, while admitting that he was a fan, criticised the portrayal of his fictional counterpart, Alejandro Terante (played by Soliman Cruz), as power-hungry and corrupt. Albayalde subsequently withdrew his support for the show. DILG Secretary Eduardo Año also voiced his displeasure over the depiction of the police force and threatened to file a case against the show's producers for the illegal use of PNP insignias and uniforms, punishable under Article 179 of the Revised Penal Code, if the show did not change its plot. Senator Panfilo Lacson, a former PNP Chief, sympathised with Albayalde, stating that the portrayal of the PNP was unfair.

Prior to the PNP's official withdrawal of support, Martin apologised to the PNP and assured them that the show had no intention to malign the organisation. Martin explained that Albayalde, who was relatively new to his post at the time, may have misunderstood the story arc and further assured that the depiction of policemen as scalawags would not be permanent. ABS-CBN also assured the PNP that it had no intention to disparage the police in this fictional work.

Many others defended the show and criticised the PNP for being overly sensitive. Among those who supported Ang Probinsyano was Senator Grace Poe, whose father starred in the original film. Poe highlighted that the show promoted positive values such as respect for elders, courage, and patriotism, and pointed out that the original film also featured corrupt policemen. She urged the PNP to see the bigger picture, emphasising that the series protagonist is a policeman. Actress Jasmine Curtis-Smith also criticised the PNP's reaction, recalling a similar incident involving Goyo: Ang Batang Heneral. The Concerned Artists of the Philippines (CAP) condemned the PNP and DILG statements as an attack on freedom of expression. Likewise, the Let's Organize for Democracy and Integrity (LODI) group slammed the PNP and urged Año and Albayalde to "look in the mirror". Many netizens also defended the show.

The MTRCB, through its chair Rachel Arenas, stated that it could not censor the show, as the agency serves as a bridge between constitutionally protected expression and the state's right to regulate. Arenas added that she saw nothing objectionable in the portrayal.

Following a meeting between Martin, the show's producers, the PNP, and the DILG, the agencies eventually expressed support for the show. ABS-CBN and the DILG jointly announced that they would continue to support Ang Probinsyano "as it continues to inspire Filipinos with the valuable lesson that in the end, good will always triumph over evil." A Memorandum of understanding was later signed between the parties.

==== "Atake" episode depicting rape and violence against policewomen ====
A scene in the July 15, 2019 episode showed the rape of policewomen by the character Bungo (played by Baron Geisler). Netizens claimed that the rape and violence depicted were too graphic, while PNP members argued that the rape of uniformed officers disrespected their uniforms.

In a statement, PNP Deputy Spokesperson Lt. Col. Kimberly Molitas said that the PNP would discuss the matter with the production staff and, "[d]epending on the extent of the violation, may warn them or rescind the said MOU."

=== Unflattering depiction of PAO ===
The controversy with the PNP recurred when Public Attorney's Office (PAO) Chief Persida Rueda-Acosta criticised the show for its "unauthorised" use of the PAO seal, echoing Senator Lacson's earlier statements. Additionally, she objected to a scene depicting PAO lawyers as unwilling to take on a case that would pit them against the allies of President Lucas Cabrera (Edu Manzano).

=== Alleged staff maltreatment ===
The show was hounded by rumours of staff maltreatment on set. These included allegations about Coco Martin's supposed temper, which, according to Arjo Atayde, was "a big, big misinterpretation". Atayde explained that Martin's gestures were only meant to remind everyone on set to observe proper decorum, as Martin cared deeply about the show and wanted it to be as perfect as possible.

Martin was also alleged to have doused the staff and cast with water while they were sleeping. The issue resurfaced a year later when Robin Padilla accused Martin of the dousing stunt and of arguing with a female location director, allegedly losing his temper. Padilla's claims came amid his rants against ABS-CBN, which was then facing the impending expiration of its franchise and delays in the House of Representatives regarding franchise renewal bills.

Dreamscape Entertainment, however, rejected Padilla's claims, explaining that the water dousing incidents were merely pranks. This was corroborated by Atayde, who again defended Martin.

On August 19, 2019, Irene Minor, a supposed talent manager, became the subject of a complaint on Bitag. The complainant alleged that Minor was involved in a ponzi scheme and was not paying the talents she brought on set. Minor contended that ABS-CBN was not paying her, and that she was actually advancing payment to her people through the investments that were the subject of the complaint. ABS-CBN denied Minor's claims, stated that she was neither connected to the show nor to the network, and that she had already been banned after receiving similar complaints.

The issue resurfaced again when a former cameraman of ABS-CBN launched new accusations against Martin following his statements rallying support for ABS-CBN's franchise renewal. Actors, directors, and staff members defended Martin and released statements refuting the cameraman's allegations point by point.

=== Franchise renewal ===
Following Solicitor General Jose Calida's filing of a quo warranto petition before the Supreme Court seeking to nullify ABS-CBN's franchise, the stars of Ang Probinsyano joined a prayer vigil for the franchise renewal and appealed to members of Congress to grant it.

Coco Martin became one of the most outspoken critics of the Duterte administration after ABS-CBN was forced off the air. Martin launched tirades against the National Telecommunications Commission and Solicitor General Jose Calida for their roles in the shutdown, remarking that they had made fools out of Filipinos. He also criticised presidential spokesperson Harry Roque for his statements regarding the future of ABS-CBN employees and for the preferential treatment allegedly given to Philippine Offshore Gaming Operators (POGOs).

Internet trolls targeted Martin's social media accounts, leading him to deactivate his Instagram account.

Calida retaliated against Martin during the 1 June 2020 House committee hearings on the franchise renewal, quipping, "He feels that he can solve their problems the same way as he solves them on screen, with macho bluster and bravado. Allegedly, he has apologised for his tantrum," in reference to Martin.

In the midst of the controversy, Martin explained that he was passionate about ABS-CBN's fate because he was concerned for his "family"—referring to ABS-CBN employees.

Apart from Martin's statements, Ang Probinsyano and the character Cardo Dalisay emerged as top trending topics on Twitter on the day ABS-CBN was forced off the air, and again after its return was announced.

== Reception ==
=== Sociocultural and political ===
==== Societal issues ====
The show was praised for integrating timely societal issues into its storylines. One critic described Ang Probinsyano as a "social commentary of our times." It was also commended for its portrayal of the polarising Philippine drug war.

However, the series received both criticism and praise for its depiction of various government agencies and their personnel.

On its February 15, 2022 episode, a fictional presidential debate was shown. This episode coincided with the actual presidential debate organised by the controversial SMNI network.

==== Values ====
Ang Probinsyano was lauded for highlighting positive values on television, such as patriotism, the importance of prayer, acceptance of members of the LGBT community, and the central role of family in Philippine society.

The show's depiction of the characters' sentiments toward current events resonated with audiences, who found them relatable. According to sociologist Josephine Placido, the show earned the title "Pambansang Teleserye" because of the good values and life lessons it imparts.

Historian Xiao Chua observed that the show gives Filipinos hope as it follows the "light-dark-light" narrative structure typical of Philippine epic poetry, a style also used by Fernando Poe Jr. in his films. The character Cardo Dalisay was praised as a role model who was "steadfast and incorruptible."

The show also engaged with communities through outreach activities, such as leading the Oplan Balik Eskwela program, where Martin distributed school supplies to students at Paradise Farm Elementary School in Blanca.

==== Ligtas Tips ====
The show produced public service announcements known as Ligtas Tips. These aired during commercial breaks, with corresponding infographics available on the show's website. In 2017, Ligtas Tips were compiled into FPJ's Ang Probinsyano Ligtas Tips, published by ABS-CBN Publishing.

==== Platform for returning actors ====
The series served as an avenue for veteran actors to return to television. Many action stars were featured, owing to the decline of the action genre in cinemas. Senator Ramon "Bong" Revilla Jr. praised Martin and the series as a blessing to former stars and stuntmen.

Martin also cast out-of-work actors, giving them another opportunity in show business. Among these stars were Mark Anthony Fernandez, CJ Ramos, Rhed Bustamante, Whitney Tyson, and Mystica.

==== Revival of the action genre ====
The series helped revive the action genre in both film and television. Cast members Jeric Raval and Jolo Revilla thanked Martin for revitalising the genre, while action star Ronnie Ricketts credited Martin with keeping it alive.

==== "Immortality" and superhero status of Cardo Dalisay ====
Much like Fernando Poe Jr.'s film character, Martin's portrayal of Cardo was described as "immortal." This reputation does not stem from Cardo's fighting skills alone but from his uncanny ability to escape death. These include his "death" at the hands of Marco Cabrera (JC Santos), later revealed as a dream, and his brushes with death after encounters with Bungo (Baron Geisler) and Lito (Richard Gutierrez). These "deaths" and the series' numerous extensions made it the subject of jokes and memes among Filipino netizens. Martin himself acknowledged these memes, even posting his own, joking that the show would end in September 2048. These incidents generated strong fan reactions.

Martin described Fernando Poe Jr. as his superhero. Like Poe, Martin eventually attained superhero status in the eyes of fans. This status led to him being seen as the "face of the resistance."

==== Political influence ====
As the country's top-rating and longest-running action series, Ang Probinsyano became a sought-after platform for political endorsements. The involvement started when Martin endorsed Grace Poe for President during the 2016 national elections. Martin also supported Poe in the 2019 midterm elections.

In a 2018 survey conducted by PUBLiCUS Asia, Inc., Martin was rated the most valuable celebrity endorsement to voters in Metro Manila. Earlier that year, character names from the show were used in a mock election held by the COMELEC, where Cardo Dalisay "won" as barangay chairman.

Martin and leading lady Yassi Pressman endorsed the Ang Probinsyano party-list as representatives of its youth sector. The party-list ranked fifth, securing a seat in the House of Representatives. However, former AGHAM Partylist representative Angelo Palmones contested the party-list's registration, alleging that it used the television series' name to skirt regulations on candidates' TV exposure.

Another controversy arose when party-list representative Alfredo de los Santos was involved in an incident in Albay where he punched a waiter. The party-list conducted an investigation, and De los Santos later apologised.

Actors with political aspirations also sought exposure in the series to boost their public profile. They had to be written off before their respective campaign periods began. Nine former cast or guest cast members ran in the 2019 midterm elections, with only Lito Lapid and Jhong Hilario winning. Grace Poe placed second in the senatorial race, and two party-list groups bearing the show's name landed in the top 10, underscoring the series' influence.

=== Special citations ===
==== CIDG ====
In January 2016, Martin received a certificate of appreciation for his portrayal of Cardo Dalisay. The citation was awarded during the 63rd Criminal Investigation and Detection Group (CIDG) Founding Anniversary.

In July of the same year, Martin was invited as a guest at Camp Crame by then-PNP Chief Ronald "Bato" dela Rosa, who publicly expressed that he was a fan of the show. Dela Rosa thanked Martin for the show's positive depiction of the Philippine National Police (PNP).

==== DILG ====
The series also received praise from then-Interior and Local Government Secretary Ismael Sueno, who stated that the police force should emulate the character of Cardo Dalisay.

==== House of Representatives ====
On September 14, 2016, Surigao del Norte Representative Robert Ace Barbers filed House Resolution No. 358 in the 17th Congress of the Philippines. The resolution commended the show for its efforts to promote crime awareness and prevention among viewers, and endorsed Martin as "Celebrity Advocate for a Drug-Free Philippines."

== Accolades ==
Year	Award-giving body	Category	Recipient	Result	Source
2016	30th PMPC Star Awards for Television	Best Primetime Series	FPJ's Ang Probinsyano	Won	
2016	30th PMPC Star Awards for Television	Best Drama Actor of the Year	Coco Martin	Won	
2016	30th PMPC Star Awards for Television	Best Drama Supporting Actor of the Year	Albert Martinez	Nominated	
2016	30th PMPC Star Awards for Television	Best Drama Supporting Actor of the Year	Eddie Garcia	Nominated	
2016	30th PMPC Star Awards for Television	Best Drama Supporting Actor of the Year	Arjo Atayde	Won	
2016	30th PMPC Star Awards for Television	Best Drama Supporting Actress of the Year	Susan Roces	Nominated	
2016	30th PMPC Star Awards for Television	Best New Male TV Personality	Simon Ezekiel Pineda	Won	
2016	30th PMPC Star Awards for Television	Best Child Performer	McNeal "Awra" Briguela	Won	
2016	63rd CIDG Founding Anniversary	Certificate of Appreciation	Coco Martin	Won	
2016	6th People Management Association of the Philippines (PMAP) Makatao Awards for Media Excellence	Makatao Exemplary Awardee	FPJ's Ang Probinsyano	Won	
2016	PEP List Awards 2016	Teleserye Supporting Actor of the Year	Arjo Atayde	Won	
2016	18th Anak TV Awards	Top Male Anak TV Makabata Star for 2015	Coco Martin	Won	
2016	3rd UmalohokJUAN Communication & Media Awards	Best TV Actor	Coco Martin	Won	
2016	3rd UmalohokJUAN Communication & Media Awards	Best Child Performer	Simon Ezekiel Pineda	Won	
2016	7th Northwest Samar State University Students’ Choice Awards for Radio and Television (NSCART)	Best Actor in Primetime Teleserye	Coco Martin	Won	
2016	4th Kagitingan Awards for TV of Bataan Peninsula State University	Pinakamagiting na Personalidad sa Dulang Serye	Coco Martin	Won	
2016	4th Kagitingan Awards for TV of Bataan Peninsula State University	Pinakamagiting na Dulang Serye	FPJ's Ang Probinsyano	Won	
2016	24th KBP Golden Dove Awards	Best TV Actor in a Drama Program	Coco Martin	Won	
2016	1st Golden Laurel: Lycean Choice Media Awards	Best TV Actor	Coco Martin	Won	
2016	1st Golden Laurel: Lycean Choice Media Awards	Best Primetime Series	FPJ's Ang Probinsyano	Won	
2016	LPU-Laguna Kung-gihan Awards 2016	Safety Awareness TV Personality	Coco Martin	Won	
2016	Alta Media Icon Awards 2016	Best Drama Actor for TV	Coco Martin	Won	
2016	Alta Media Icon Awards 2016	Best Primetime Drama Series	FPJ's Ang Probinsyano	Won	
2016	6th TV Series Craze Awards (2015)	Best Primetime TV Series	FPJ's Ang Probinsyano	Won	
2016	6th Edukcircle Awards	Best Drama Actress of the Year	Bela Padilla	Won	
2016	6th Edukcircle Awards	Best Television Drama Actor – Hall of Fame	Coco Martin	Won	
2016	14th Gawad Tanglaw Awards	Best Performance by an Actor	Coco Martin	Won	
2016	14th Gawad Tanglaw Awards	Best Television Series	FPJ's Ang Probinsyano	Won	
2016	38th Catholic Mass Media Awards	Best Drama Series Program	FPJ's Ang Probinsyano	Won	
2016	47th GMMSF Box Office Entertainment Awards	Best Popular Child Performer	Simon Ezekiel Pineda	Won	
2016	47th GMMSF Box Office Entertainment Awards	Highest Record Rating Teleserye of All Time	FPJ's Ang Probinsyano	Won	
2016	PUP Mabini Media Awards 2016	Best Primetime Drama Program	FPJ's Ang Probinsyano	Won	
2016	2nd Illumine GIC Innovation Awards For Television	Most Innovative TV Actor for 2016	Coco Martin	Won	
2016	2nd Illumine GIC Innovation Awards For Television	Most Innovative TV Child Star for 2016	Simon Ezekiel Pineda	Won	
2016	2nd Illumine GIC Innovation Awards For Television	Most Innovative Television Series for 2016	FPJ's Ang Probinsyano	Won	
2016	19th Anak TV Awards	Household Favorite Program	FPJ's Ang Probinsyano	Won	
2016	19th Anak TV Awards	Makabata Hall of Fame	Coco Martin	Won	
2016	19th Anak TV Awards	Makabata Star 2016	Yassi Pressman	Won	
2016	7th TV Series Craze Awards (2016)	Overall Best TV series of 2016	FPJ's Ang Probinsyano	Won	
2016	7th TV Series Craze Awards (2016)	Leading Man of the Year	Coco Martin	Won	
2017	3rd Aral Parangal Awards	Best Drama Actor	Coco Martin	Won	
2017	3rd Aral Parangal Awards	Best Child Performer	McNeal "Awra" Briguela	Won	
2017	3rd Aral Parangal Awards	Best Television Primetime Drama Series	FPJ's Ang Probinsyano	Won	
2017	Guild of Educators, Mentors, and Students Hiyas ng Sining	Best Actor	Arjo Atayde	Won	
2017	Guild of Educators, Mentors, and Students Hiyas ng Sining	Natatanging Hiyas ng Sining sa Telebisyon	Coco Martin	Won	
2017	Guild of Educators, Mentors, and Students Hiyas ng Sining	Best TV Series	FPJ's Ang Probinsyano	Won	
2017	Gawad Bedista Awards 2017	Actor of the Year for Television	Coco Martin	Won	
2017	4th PARAGALA: Central Luzon Media Awards	Best Television Actor	Coco Martin	Won	
2017	4th PARAGALA: Central Luzon Media Awards	Best Teleserye	FPJ's Ang Probinsyano	Won	
2017	4th UmalohokJUAN Communication & Media Awards	Television Actor of the Year	Coco Martin	Won	
2017	8th Northwest Samar State University Students' Choice Awards for Radio and Television (NSCART)	Best Actor in a Primetime Teleserye	Coco Martin	Won	
2017	8th Northwest Samar State University Students' Choice Awards for Radio and Television (NSCART)	Best Supporting Actor in a Primetime Teleserye	Arjo Atayde	Won	
2017	8th Northwest Samar State University Students' Choice Awards for Radio and Television (NSCART)	Best Male Child Star	Simon Ezekiel Pineda	Won	
2017	8th Northwest Samar State University Students' Choice Awards for Radio and Television (NSCART)	Best Primetime Teleserye	FPJ's Ang Probinsyano	Won	
2017	19th Gawad Pasado Awards	Pinkapasadong Simbolo ng Kagandahang Asal	Coco Martin	Won	
2017	19th Gawad Pasado Awards	Pinakapasadong Likhang-Bata 2017	Simon Pineda	Won	
2017	Kagitingan Awards for Television 2017	Pinakamagiting na Seryeng Drama	FPJ's Ang Probinsyano	Won	
2017	Kagitingan Awards for Television 2017	Pinakamagiting na Dulang Personalidad sa Seryeng Drama	Coco Martin	Won	
2017	5th UmalohokJUAN Communication & Media Awards	Television Actor of the Year	Coco Martin	Won	
2017	48th GMMSF Box Office Entertainment Awards	Most Popular TV Program (Primetime Drama)	FPJ's Ang Probinsyano	Won	
2017	48th GMMSF Box Office Entertainment Awards	Breakthrough Performance by an Actor in a Single Program	Coco Martin	Won	
2017	48th GMMSF Box Office Entertainment Awards	TV Supporting Actor of the Year	Arjo Atayde	Won	
2017	48th GMMSF Box Office Entertainment Awards	TV Supporting Actress of the Year	Susan Roces	Won	
2017	48th GMMSF Box Office Entertainment Awards	Most Promising TV Actress of the year	Yassi Pressman	Won	
2017	48th GMMSF Box Office Entertainment Awards	Breakthrough Child Star of Movies and TV	McNeal "Awra" Briguela	Won	
2017	48th GMMSF Box Office Entertainment Awards	Most Popular Male Child Performer	Simon "Onyok" Pineda	Won	
2017	Platinum Stallion Media Awards 2017	Best Primetime Show	FPJ's Ang Probinsyano	Won	
2017	Platinum Stallion Media Awards 2017	Citation for Youth Character Model of the Year	Coco Martin	Won	
2017	2nd Golden Laurel: LPU Batangas Media Awards	Best Primetime Series	FPJ's Ang Probinsyano	Won	
2017	2nd Golden Laurel: LPU Batangas Media Awards	Best Television Actor	Coco Martin	Won	
2017	25th KBP Golden Dove Awards	Best Public Service Announcement	FPJ's Ang Probinsyano Ligtas Tips	Won	
2017	25th KBP Golden Dove Awards	Best Actor for Drama Program	Coco Martin	Won	
2017	3rd Alta Media Icon Awards	Best Television Drama Actor	Coco Martin	Won	
2017	3rd Alta Media Icon Awards	Best Child Actor for TV	Awra Briguela	Won	
2017	7th EdukCircle Awards	Most Influential TV Actor of the Year	Coco Martin	Won	
2017	St. Paul College Pasig's P.A.T.O.K. Awards	Dramang Pantelebisyon	FPJ's Ang Probinsyano	Won	
2017	2017 Lopez Achievement Award	Awardee (A Teleserye Beyond Entertainment)	FPJ's Ang Probinsyano	Won	
2017	1st Gawad La Sallianeta 2017	Most Outstanding Primetime Show	FPJ's Ang Probinsyano	Won	
2017	31st PMPC Star Awards for Television	Best Primetime Series	FPJ's Ang Probinsyano	Nominated	
2017	31st PMPC Star Awards for Television	Best Drama Actor of the Year	Coco Martin	Nominated	
2017	31st PMPC Star Awards for Television	Best Drama Supporting Actor of the Year	Jhong Hilario	Nominated	
2017	31st PMPC Star Awards for Television	Best Drama Supporting Actress of the Year	Susan Roces	Nominated	
2017	31st PMPC Star Awards for Television	Best Drama Supporting Actress of the Year	Yassi Pressman	Nominated	
2018	1st NCST Dangal Ng Bayan Media Excellence Awards	Model Actor for Criminology	Coco Martin	Won	
2018	3rd GIC Innovation Awards for Television	Most Innovative TV Child Star	Awra Briguela	Won	
2018	3rd GIC Innovation Awards for Television	Most Innovative Primetime TV Actor	Coco Martin	Won	
2018	3rd GIC Innovation Awards for Television	Most Innovative Primetime TV Program	FPJ's Ang Probinsyano	Won	
2018	ABS-CBN Walk on Water Awards 2018	Creative Breakthrough Long Form Category	FPJ's Ang Probinsyano	Won	
2018	1st Batarisan Media Awards	Best Drama Actor for TV	Coco Martin	Won	
2018	1st Batarisan Media Awards	Best Primetime Show	FPJ's Ang Probinsyano	Won	
2018	16th Gawad Tanglaw Awards	Teleserye ng Dekada	FPJ's Ang Probinsyano	Won	
2018	32nd PMPC Star Awards for Television	Best Drama Actor of the Year	Coco Martin	Nominated	
2018	32nd PMPC Star Awards for Television	Best Drama Supporting Actor of the Year	Jhong Hilario	Nominated	
2018	32nd PMPC Star Awards for Television	Best Drama Supporting Actress of the Year	Susan Roces	Nominated	
2018	32nd PMPC Star Awards for Television	Best Drama Supporting Actress of the Year	Yassi Pressman	Nominated	
2018	32nd PMPC Star Awards for Television	Best New Male TV Personality	Ronwaldo Martin	Nominated	
2018	32nd PMPC Star Awards for Television	Best Child Performer	Nayomi "Heart" Ramos	Nominated	
2018	32nd PMPC Star Awards for Television	German Moreno Power Tandem of the Year	Coco Martin and Yassi Pressman	Won	
2018	49th GMMSF Box Office Entertainment Awards	Best Primetime TV Program	FPJ's Ang Probinsyano	Won	
2018	9th TV Series Craze Awards (2018)	Best Primetime TV Series	FPJ's Ang Probinsyano	Won	
2018	9th TV Series Craze Awards (2018)	Longest Running Teleserye Award	FPJ's Ang Probinsyano	Won	
2018	5th PARAGALA: Central Luzon Media Awards	Best Teleserye	FPJ's Ang Probinsyano	Won	
2018	5th PARAGALA: Central Luzon Media Awards	Best Teleserye Hall of Fame	FPJ's Ang Probinsyano	Won	
2018	5th PARAGALA: Central Luzon Media Awards	Best Television Actor	Coco Martin	Won	
2018	5th PARAGALA: Central Luzon Media Awards	Best TV Actor Hall of Fame	Coco Martin	Won	
2018	5th PARAGALA: Central Luzon Media Awards	Best TV Actress	Yassi Pressman	Won	
2019	6th PARAGALA: Central Luzon Media Awards	Best Teleserye	FPJ's Ang Probinsyano	Won	
2019	6th PARAGALA: Central Luzon Media Awards	Best Television Actor	Coco Martin	Won	
2019	6th PARAGALA: Central Luzon Media Awards	Best Television Actress	Yassi Pressman	Won	
2019	4th Golden Laurel: LPU Batangas Media Awards	Best Primetime Series	FPJ's Ang Probinsyano	Nominated	
2019	4th Golden Laurel: LPU Batangas Media Awards	Best Television Actor	Coco Martin	Nominated	
2019	4th Golden Laurel: LPU Batangas Media Awards	Best Television Actress	Yassi Pressman	Nominated	
2019	4th Golden Laurel: LPU Batangas Media Awards	Best Television Supporting Actor	Jhong Hilario	Won	
2019	4th Golden Laurel: LPU Batangas Media Awards	Best Supporting Television Actress	Susan Roces	Won	
2019	4th Golden Laurel: LPU Batangas Media Awards	Best Supporting Television Actress	Angel Aquino	Nominated	
2019	50th GMMSF Box Office Entertainment Awards	Most Popular TV Program Primetime Drama	FPJ's Ang Probinsyano	Won	
2019	50th GMMSF Box Office Entertainment Awards	Golden Jury Award for All Time Favorite Actor	Eddie Garcia	Won	
2019	50th GMMSF Box Office Entertainment Awards	TV Supporting Actress of the Year	Yassi Pressman	Won	
2019	5th Alta Media Icon Awards	Best Primetime Drama Series	FPJ's Ang Probinsyano	Won	
2019	2019 Platinum Stallion Media Awards	Socially Relevant TV Series	FPJ's Ang Probinsyano	Won	
2019	2019 Platinum Stallion Media Awards	Best TV Male Personality	Coco Martin	Won	
2019	22nd Anak TV Awards	Household Favorite Award	FPJ's Ang Probinsyano	Won	
2019	22nd Anak TV Awards	Makabata Star 2019	Susan Roces	Won	
2019	22nd Anak TV Awards	Makabata Star 2019	Yassi Pressman	Won	
2019	17th Gawad Tanglaw Awards	Best Supporting Actor	Edu Manzano	Won	
2019	33rd PMPC Star Awards for Television	Best Primetime Series	FPJ's Ang Probinsyano	Nominated	
2019	33rd PMPC Star Awards for Television	Best Drama Actor of the Year	Coco Martin	Nominated	
2019	33rd PMPC Star Awards for Television	Best Drama Supporting Actor of the Year	Baron Geisler	Nominated	
2019	33rd PMPC Star Awards for Television	Best Drama Supporting Actress of the Year	Susan Roces	Nominated	
2019	33rd PMPC Star Awards for Television	Best Drama Supporting Actress of the Year	Yassi Pressman	Nominated	
2019	33rd PMPC Star Awards for Television	Best Child Performer	Kenken Nuyad	Nominated	
2020	10th TV Series Craze Awards (2019)	Leading Man of the Year Hall of Famer	Coco Martin	Won	
2020	3rd Gawad Lasallianeta Awards	Most Outstanding Male TV Dramatic Actor	Coco Martin	Won	
2020	51st GMMSF Box Office Entertainment Awards	Most Popular TV Program (Primetime Drama)	FPJ's Ang Probinsyano	Won	
2020	51st GMMSF Box Office Entertainment Awards	TV Actor of the Year (Primetime Drama)	Coco Martin	Won	
2020	11th Northwest Samar State University Students’ Choice Awards for Radio and Television (NSCART)	Best Actor in Primetime Teleserye	Coco Martin	Won	
2020	11th Northwest Samar State University Students’ Choice Awards for Radio and Television (NSCART)	Best Primetime Teleserye	FPJ's Ang Probinsyano	Won	

== See also ==
- Ang Probinsyano (film)
- Pagbabalik ng Probinsyano
- List of Kapamilya Channel original programming
- List of Kapamilya Online Live original programming
- List of A2Z (TV channel) original programming
- List of TV5 (Philippine TV network) original programming
- List of programs broadcast by ABS-CBN
- List of programs broadcast by Jeepney TV
- List of ABS-CBN Studios original drama series
