= Ang Probinsyano season 3 =

Season of television series

Ang Probinsyano
- Season 3
- Second version of Season 3's title card commemorating its 2nd Anniversary.
- Starring: Coco Martin
- No. of episodes: 119

Release
- Original network: ABS-CBN
- Original release: May 25 – November 7, 2017

Season chronology
- ← Previous; Season 2 Next → Season 4

The third season of Ang Probinsyano, a Philippine action drama television series, premiered on May 25, 2017, on ABS-CBN's Primetime Bida evening block and worldwide on The Filipino Channel and concluded on November 7, 2017, with a total of 119 episodes. The series stars Coco Martin as SPO2 Ricardo Dalisay, together with an ensemble cast consisting of Susan Roces, Jaime Fabregas, Angel Aquino, John Arcilla, Jhong Hilario, John Prats, Sid Lucero, Mitch Valdes, Pokwang, Yassi Pressman, Eddie Garcia, and Lito Lapid.

The third season of Ang Probinsyano shows Ricardo Dalisay's married life and how he is thrust back into the police force to battle rebels. After an ill-fated mission, he goes undercover and infiltrates the rebel group Pulang Araw to uncover the mystery of who is the true ally and who is the real enemy.

== Plot ==
Cardo and his family move into another house to start a new life following his resignation from the police force. Meanwhile, a rebel group named Pulang Araw wages war against the military to fight for their noble cause.

Unbeknownst to them, Alakdan's group betray the Pulang Araw although they are backed-up by an unknown corrupt government official and agree to set off bombings in Manila, resulting in the untimely death of Ricky Boy, Cardo's son. Driven by the need of justice, Cardo goes back to his duty and becomes a SAF officer. However, after a deadly mission almost wipes their entire group, Cardo infiltrates the Pulang Araw and goes undercover.

As Cardo (posing under the name Fernan) joins various missions of Pulang Araw, his perception about the rebel group quickly changes, realizing that their public image is based on lies and carefully concocted smear campaign by Director Hipolito a treacherous and wily ex-Pulang Araw member. Back in Manila, the propaganda stories about Cardo and Pulang Araw confuses Cardo's family, negatively affecting their lives. Rumours spread about Cardo’s survival and supposed defection to Pulang Araw, a story which Director Hipolito (John Arcilla) and Major Catindig (Sid Lucero) capitalize to destroy Cardo's credibility, blow his cover and jeopardize his safety. At the camp, Cardo also has to deal with comrade rivalries arising from Alakdan (Jhong Hilario) and a jealous Anton del Mundo alias "Tigre" (transl. Tiger) (Mark Lapid), both intent on discrediting Cardo or exposing him as a fraud.

After determining and knows the secret that Pulang Araw is not behind the acts of terrorism, he tries to win the trust of Alakdan to infiltrate the Kamandag faction of Pulang Araw. In the meantime, he discovers that dela Paz (Ejay Falcon) and Velasco (Louise delos Reyes) are held captive and helps them escape from the hands of Pulang Araw. He tells them of his discovery that Kamandag is protected by an unknown government official who is twisting facts to demonize Pulang Araw. Velasco and dela Paz realize that Kamandag's protector is also discrediting Cardo. They hold a press conference reporting Cardo’s death while trying to escape from Pulang Araw with them to ensure his cover.

Cardo wins Alakdan's trust and sends him to Manila to eliminate Director Hipolito's fiercest rival in the senate race, Senator Mateo F. de Silva (Joko Diaz) by detonating a bomb among the crowd just before de Silva announces his candidacy. Cardo manages the disruption without detonating a bomb and narrowly escapes de Silva and his men. The following day, Cardo assaults Kamandag to avenge the death of his son, sending a wounded Alakdan and the rest of Kamandag packing. Cardo then informs Pulang Araw of the betrayal and acts of terrorism that Alakdan perpetrated.

To boost his poll ratings, Director Hipolito resolves to wipe out Pulang Araw and orders a strike on their stronghold in Mt. Karagao. The ensuing encounter that results in the deaths of Lawin (Dante Rivero), Lena (Yam Concepcion) and Lena's son, Emman (Emmanuel Matteo Gabriel Plan), leads to Leon’s (Lito Lapid) discovery that Cardo is a SAF member. Romulo and Cardo engage in a knife dueling club on top of the mountain hill, ending with them joining forces in order to take down Alakdan.

== Cast and characters ==
Main cast

- Coco Martin as SPO2 Ricardo "Cardo" Dalisay
- John Arcilla as Director Renato "Buwitre" Hipolito
- Jaime Fábregas as P/Dir. Delfin S. Borja
- Angel Aquino as BGen. Diana T. Olegario
- Jhong Hilario as Homer "Alakdan" Adlawan
- John Prats as SPO3 Jerome Girona, Jr.
- Sid Lucero as Maj. Manolo "Nolo" Catindig
- Pokwang as Amor Nieves
- Mitch Valdes as Kapitana Gina Magtanggol
- Ronwaldo Martin as Roldan/Gagamba
- Yassi Pressman as Alyana R. Arevalo-Dalisay
- Susan Roces as Flora "Lola Kap" S. Borja-de Leon
- Eddie Garcia as Don Emilio Syquia

Supporting cast

- Malou Crisologo as Yolanda "Yolly" Capuyao-Santos
- Marvin Yap as Elmo Santos
- John Medina as PS/Insp. Avel "Billy" M. Guzman
- Lester Llansang as Police PS/Insp. Mark Vargas
- Michael Roy Jornales as PS/Insp. Francisco "Chikoy" Rivera
- Marc Solis as SPO1 Rigor Soriano
- Long Mejia as Francisco "Paco" Alvarado
- PJ Endrinal as Wally Nieves
- Benj Manalo as Felipe "Pinggoy" Tanyag, Jr.
- Jeffrey Tam as Otep
- Pedro "Zaito" Canon, Jr. as Nick
- Roy "Shernan" Gaite as Gido
- Jay Gonzaga as James Cordero
- Arlene Tolibas as Marikit Flores
- Gary Lim as Gaspar Romero
- Sancho delas Alas as Gregorio "Greco" Cortez
- Simon Ezekiel Pineda as Honorio "Onyok" Amaba
- McNeal "Awra" Briguela as Macario "Makmak" Samonte, Jr.
- James "Paquito" Sagarino as Paquito Alvarado
- Rhian "Dang" Ramos as Amanda "Dang" Ignacio
- Shantel Crislyn Layh "Ligaya" Ngujo as Ligaya Dungalo
- Enzo Pelojero as Dexter Flores
- Joel Torre as Teodoro "Teddy" Arevalo
- Shamaine Centenera-Buencamino as Virginia "Virgie" R. Arevalo
- McCoy de Leon as Juan Pablo "JP" R. Arevalo

Guest cast

- Al Vaughn Chier Tuliao as Ricardo "Ricky Boy" A. Dalisay, Jr.
- Lito Lapid as Romulo "Leon" Dumaguit
- Mark Lapid as Anton "Tigre" del Mundo
- Jun Hidalgo as Luis "Buwaya" Mangubat
- Gene Padilla as Pilo/Tuko
- Wilmar Peñaflorida as Mando/Ahas
- Alessandra de Rossi as Rowena Macaraeg
- Dino Pastrano as Col. Ernesto Capili
- Marco Gumabao as Jose Rafael "Joel" T. Olegario
- Mercedes Cabral as Aurora Dumaguit
- Yam Concepcion as Magdalena "Lena" Dumaguit
- Emmanuel Matteo Gabriel Plan as Emman
- Vickie Rushton as Amanda
- Tanner Mata as Clark
- Michael de Mesa as Ramil "Manager" Taduran
- Julio Diaz as Julian Valerio
- Jeric Raval as Gener Guinto
- Jayson Gainza as Jimboy Escaño
- King Gutierrez as J/Dir. Pedro Ladronio
- Harold Baldonado as Bolit
- Brando Legaspi as Jonard
- David Minemoto as David
- Eddie Gutierrez as P/DGen. (Chief PNP) Rodolfo D. Recto
- Ron Morales as SPO2 Bernardo "Bernie" Quinto
- Dominic Roque as PO3 Christian "Chris" Clemente
- Louise delos Reyes as PO3 Katrina "Kat" Velasco
- Ejay Falcon as SPO2 Geraldo "Gerry" dela Paz
- Giovanni Baldisseri as P/Supt. Lemuel Peralta
- Zeppi Borromeo as SPO2 Roberto "Bong" de Vera
- Sandino Martin as SPO2 Marlon Delgado
- AJ Muhlach as Simon "Paniki" Yumul
- Dante Rivero as Domingo "Lawin" Bulaon
- Lito Pimentel as young Domingo Bulaon
- Jon Lucas as young Renato Hipolito
- Jomari Angeles as young Romulo Dumaguit
- Brian "Smugglaz" Lao as Marsial "Butete" Matero
- Lordivino "Bassilyo" Ignacio as Dante "Bulate" Villafuerte
- Rey Solo as Kalabaw
- Benzon Dalina as Barakuda
- Edwin Nombre Pamanian as Hunyango
- Paul Alvarez as Sebastian
- Aljur Abrenica as Miguel Enriquez
- Jestoni Alarcon as Javier Enriquez
- Lem Pelayo as SAF Officer Simpao
- Joko Diaz as Senator Mateo F. de Silva
- Alvin Anson as Alvaro
- Gerald Ejército as Ronald
- Roberto "Amay Bisaya" Reyes as Ruben
- Vince Rillon as Victor F. de Silva

== Episodes ==
| No. overall | No. in season | Title | Original air date | Kantar media rating (nationwide) |
|---|---|---|---|---|
| 429 | 1 | "Kabanata" | May 25, 2017 | 40.4% |
| 430 | 2 | "Pagkawalay" | May 26, 2017 | 37.8% |
| 431 | 3 | "Pasada" | May 29, 2017 | 39.1% |
| 432 | 4 | "Kapakanan" | May 30, 2017 | 35.2% |
| 433 | 5 | "Lusob" | May 31, 2017 | 35.8% |
| 434 | 6 | "Rebelde" | June 1, 2017 | 37.4% |
| 435 | 7 | "Nagaalala" | June 2, 2017 | 35.9% |
| 436 | 8 | "Birthday Ni Ricky" | June 5, 2017 | 35.4% |
| 437 | 9 | "Kaguluhan" | June 6, 2017 | 35.7% |
| 438 | 10 | "Anak" | June 7, 2017 | 34.2% |
| 439 | 11 | "Tulungan" | June 8, 2017 | 33.1% |
| 440 | 12 | "Paaralan" | June 9, 2017 | 33.7% |
| 441 | 13 | "Babala" | June 12, 2017 | 34.4% |
| 442 | 14 | "Segundo" | June 13, 2017 | 34.6% |
| 443 | 15 | "Kasamahan" | June 14, 2017 | 34.3% |
| 444 | 16 | "Aabangan" | June 15, 2017 | 34.1% |
| 445 | 17 | "Salpukan" | June 16, 2017 | 36.9% |
| 446 | 18 | "Ama" | June 19, 2017 | 35.9% |
| 447 | 19 | "Nasaan Si Ricky" | June 20, 2017 | 36.7% |
| 448 | 20 | "Mag-Asawa" | June 21, 2017 | 34.7% |
| 449 | 21 | "Panira" | June 22, 2017 | 36.2% |
| 450 | 22 | "Pasimuno" | June 23, 2017 | 35.7% |
| 451 | 23 | "Pagplanta" | June 26, 2017 | 36.1% |
| 452 | 24 | "Sugatan" | June 27, 2017 | 37.6% |
| 453 | 25 | "Kasawian" | June 28, 2017 | 35.9% |
| 454 | 26 | "Pagluha" | June 29, 2017 | 37.9% |
| 455 | 27 | "Paalam Ricky" | June 30, 2017 | 35.4% |
| 456 | 28 | "Sagasa" | July 3, 2017 | 38.0% |
| 457 | 29 | "Nais" | July 4, 2017 | 38.4% |
| 458 | 30 | "Dahilan" | July 5, 2017 | 35.6% |
| 459 | 31 | "Balik SAF" | July 6, 2017 | 35.0% |
| 460 | 32 | "Kaanib" | July 7, 2017 | 36.3% |
| 461 | 33 | "Karahasan" | July 10, 2017 | 36.6% |
| 462 | 34 | "Pagsagip" | July 11, 2017 | 37.5% |
| 463 | 35 | "Papuri" | July 12, 2017 | 36.9% |
| 464 | 36 | "Pagalala" | July 13, 2017 | 36.2% |
| 465 | 37 | "Paghanda" | July 14, 2017 | 37.0% |
| 466 | 38 | "Unang Harapan" | July 17, 2017 | 37.8% |
| 467 | 39 | "Dehado" | July 18, 2017 | 37.2% |
| 468 | 40 | "Magtulungan" | July 19, 2017 | 37.6% |
| 469 | 41 | "Makasama" | July 20, 2017 | 36.4% |
| 470 | 42 | "Paghihinala" | July 21, 2017 | 36.3% |
| 471 | 43 | "Pinagsamahan" | July 24, 2017 | 36.8% |
| 472 | 44 | "Pagsugod" | July 25, 2017 | 37.6% |
| 473 | 45 | "Ubusan" | July 26, 2017 | 38.1% |
| 474 | 46 | "Nabihag" | July 27, 2017 | 39.8% |
| 475 | 47 | "Hinahanap" | July 28, 2017 | 38.6% |
| 476 | 48 | "Kalagayan" | July 31, 2017 | 39.7% |
| 477 | 49 | "Huling Saludo" | August 1, 2017 | 37.2% |
| 478 | 50 | "Uniporme" | August 2, 2017 | 37.1% |
| 479 | 51 | "Tatakasan" | August 3, 2017 | 40.6% |
| 480 | 52 | "Sagabal" | August 4, 2017 | 39.5% |
| 481 | 53 | "Agila" | August 7, 2017 | 39.6% |
| 482 | 54 | "Pinagpilian" | August 8, 2017 | 38.4% |
| 483 | 55 | "Piringan" | August 9, 2017 | 36.5% |
| 484 | 56 | "Halaga" | August 10, 2017 | 39.4% |
| 485 | 57 | "Hinahamon" | August 11, 2017 | 39.1% |
| 486 | 58 | "Pagpapahirap" | August 14, 2017 | 39.8% |
| 487 | 59 | "Lalaban Tayo" | August 15, 2017 | 40.4% |
| 488 | 60 | "Namataan" | August 16, 2017 | 36.7% |
| 489 | 61 | "Nagdududa" | August 17, 2017 | 37.4% |
| 490 | 62 | "Umaasa" | August 18, 2017 | 37.1% |
| 491 | 63 | "Ipagtanggol" | August 21, 2017 | 39.7% |
| 492 | 64 | "Natulungan" | August 22, 2017 | 40.6% |
| 493 | 65 | "Kapalit" | August 23, 2017 | 38.7% |
| 494 | 66 | "Paglilingkod" | August 24, 2017 | 38.7% |
| 495 | 67 | "Aruga" | August 25, 2017 | 37.7% |
| 496 | 68 | "Adhikian" | August 28, 2017 | 36.6% |
| 497 | 69 | "Utos" | August 29, 2017 | 40.7% |
| 498 | 70 | "Pagbibigay" | August 30, 2017 | 37.7% |
| 499 | 71 | "Ehemplo" | August 31, 2017 | 37.8% |
| 500 | 72 | "Naiinggit" | September 1, 2017 | 36.4% |
| 501 | 73 | "Kinaroroonan" | September 4, 2017 | 38.5% |
| 502 | 74 | "Pangaapi" | September 5, 2017 | 39.5% |
| 503 | 75 | "Hukay" | September 6, 2017 | 39.8% |
| 504 | 76 | "Girian" | September 7, 2017 | 39.8% |
| 505 | 77 | "Giyera" | September 8, 2017 | 40.1% |
| 506 | 78 | "Video" | September 11, 2017 | 40.8% |
| 507 | 79 | "Imbestiga" | September 12, 2017 | 40.8% |
| 508 | 80 | "Akusasyon" | September 13, 2017 | 41.5% |
| 509 | 81 | "Husga" | September 14, 2017 | 40.0% |
| 510 | 82 | "Nadiskubre" | September 15, 2017 | 40.7% |
| 511 | 83 | "Pagsalba" | September 18, 2017 | 43.2% |
| 512 | 84 | "Pagtugis" | September 19, 2017 | 43.0% |
| 513 | 85 | "Paninirang Puri" | September 20, 2017 | 41.9% |
| 514 | 86 | "Nagmamatyag" | September 21, 2017 | 40.0% |
| 515 | 87 | "Suspetsa" | September 22, 2017 | 41.7% |
| 516 | 88 | "Usap Usapan" | September 25, 2017 | 40.7% |
| 517 | 89 | "Problemado" | September 26, 2017 | 40.0% |
| 518 | 90 | "Nakasunod" | September 27, 2017 | 37.8% |
| 519 | 91 | "Ipaglaban" | September 28, 2017 | 40.0% |
| 520 | 92 | "Teorya" | September 29, 2017 | 39.3% |
| 521 | 93 | "Tumatakas" | October 2, 2017 | 40.0% |
| 522 | 94 | "Malaya" | October 3, 2017 | 40.2% |
| 523 | 95 | "Maunahan" | October 4, 2017 | 38.7% |
| 524 | 96 | "Konsensya" | October 5, 2017 | 41.2% |
| 525 | 97 | "Masilayan" | October 6, 2017 | 39.8% |
| 526 | 98 | "Gulantang" | October 9, 2017 | 41.8% |
| 527 | 99 | "Sinasakyan" | October 10, 2017 | 42.0% |
| 528 | 100 | "Ipagagawa" | October 11, 2017 | 40.6% |
| 529 | 101 | "May Pakana" | October 12, 2017 | 40.3% |
| 530 | 102 | "Balat Kayo" | October 13, 2017 | 37.0% |
| 531 | 103 | "Mapaniwala'" | October 16, 2017 | 39.4% |
| 532 | 104 | "Papatunayan" | October 17, 2017 | 40.5% |
| 533 | 105 | "Pasado" | October 18, 2017 | 38.6% |
| 534 | 106 | "Kaagaw" | October 19, 2017 | 39.7% |
| 535 | 107 | "Balik Maynila" | October 20, 2017 | 39.3% |
| 536 | 108 | "Countdown" | October 23, 2017 | 41.5% |
| 537 | 109 | "Nagpupuyos" | October 24, 2017 | 41.2% |
| 538 | 110 | "Agila vs. Alakdan" | October 25, 2017 | 39.6% |
| 539 | 111 | "Bagsik" | October 26, 2017 | 41.7% |
| 540 | 112 | "Pagsasanib Pwersa" | October 27, 2017 | 36.5% |
| 541 | 113 | "Alyansa" | October 30, 2017 | 39.2% |
| 542 | 114 | "Pahintulot" | October 31, 2017 | 39.1% |
| 543 | 115 | "Bantayan" | November 1, 2017 | 37.0% |
| 544 | 116 | "Dalisay" | November 2, 2017 | 41.1% |
| 545 | 117 | "Huling Hininga" | November 3, 2017 | 41.7% |
| 546 | 118 | "Gabi ng Traydor" | November 6, 2017 | 42.0% |
| 547 | 119 | "Gabi ng Duwelo" | November 7, 2017 | 44.2% |

Legend
| Peak Season Rating |
| Lowest Season Rating |
