= Josephine Placido =

Filipino sociologist

- Education: University of Santo Tomas
- Spouse: Raffy Placido
- Scientific career
- Fields: Sociology

Josephine Aguilar Placido (née Aguilar) is a Filipino sociologist, educational administrator, and media personality.

== Education and career ==
Placido is an alumna of the sociology program of the University of Santo Tomas Faculty of Arts and Letters. She started her career in the academe in 1981. Placido is currently associate professor at the University of Santo Tomas Faculty of Arts and Letters where she served as faculty secretary, department chairperson, and dean's councilor.

Placido is the Dean of the UST Honorary Corps of Lady Sponsors, an organization founded in 1937 by Rector Silvestre Sancho with the first colonel being President Manuel Quezon's daughter Maria Aurora.

Placido is active in the media as a resource person. She is a recurring resource person for ABS-CBN, appearing on shows such as Ang Probinsyano, Headstart, Pinoy Big Brother, and in their radio programs. She also served as a resource person for Aliw Broadcasting Corporation shows.

== See also ==
- List of University of Santo Tomas alumni
- Alice Bulos
- Clarence Batan
