= Throwback Today =

- Theatrical film poster
- Directed by: Joseph Teoxon
- Written by: Pertee Briñas
- Screenplay by: Pertee Briñas
- Story by: Pertee Briñas
- Produced by: Pertee Briñas; Aleli Mesina; Ronald Arguelles
- Starring: Carlo Aquino
- Cinematography: Gary Gardoce
- Edited by: Benjo Ferrer
- Production company: Go Motion Productions
- Distributed by: Cinema One Originals; Creative Programs
- Release dates: November 15, 2017 (Gala Night); November 16, 2017 (Cinema One Originals Film Festival)
- Country: Philippines
- Language: Filipino
- Budget: ₱3 million

Throwback Today is a 2017 Filipino independent science fiction film directed by Joseph Teoxon in his debut feature film, starring Carlo Aquino. The film premiered on November 15, 2017, at the 2017 Cinema One Originals Film Festival.

The film tells about a disgruntled young production designer named Primo (Carlo Aquino) who stumbles upon an old computer which enables him to communicate with his college self through chat as a result of a glitch in his computer. He instructs himself in an attempt to change his life.

== Cast ==
- Carlo Aquino as Primo Jose Lacson
- Empress Schuck as Andie
- Annicka Dolonius as Macy
- Allan Paule as Primo's dad
- Benj Manalo as Alex
- Kat Galang as Jen
- Ray Blakney as Entrepreneur

== Reception ==
=== Critical response ===
Fred Hawson of ABS-CBN and to his blog Fred Said gave the film six out of ten stars, and stated that, "The film's story was still very engaging to the end. Thanks to Carlo Aquino's earnest portrayal, you will care for what happens to Primo's character. There were some nice touches, like the wrist tattoos which change with each change in Primo's situation." Hawson also praised the director of the film and stated, "I [re]commend director Joseph Teoxon for his audacious choice of a complex time-themed sci-fi love story (by Pertee Brinas) for a debut feature, and pulling it off satisfactorily despite obvious technical limitations."

Ace Antipolo on his blog website Movies for Millennials, gave the film 5 out of 5 stars and comparing the film to 2004's science fiction psychological thriller The Butterfly Effect starring Ashton Kutcher. He also stated that, "Though the two films have a similar premise, Throwback Today has more heart. It's more lighter in tone and thus, far more enjoyable than the other one. Although the concept of changing your past isn't new anymore as we have seen a lot of films recycling the same concept over and over again, this sci-fi entry stands out with its fun and entertaining execution." Antipolo also praised Carlo Aquino's performance to the film.
