= Benj Manalo =

Philippine actor

- Born: Don Benjamin Manalo; July 30, 1987 (age 39); Philippines
- Occupation: Actor
- Spouse: Lovely Abella (m. 2021)

Don Benjamin Manalo (born July 30, 1987), known professionally as Benj Manalo, is a Filipino actor, recording artist, and professional dancer who is best known for his role as Pinggoy in the top-rated prime time series FPJ's Ang Probinsyano. He also appeared in other shows like On the Wings of Love, My Super D and Kadenang Ginto.

He is the second son of comedian and TV host Jose Manalo and estranged wife Anna Lyn Santos, and brother of Sherwin Nicco, an actor Myki, a medical doctor, Ai, an accounts manager and Colyn, a musician.

In 2018, he celebrated his 3rd anniversary with his girlfriend Bubble Gang comedienne Lovely Abella. He also won the Best Actor trophy at the CentroMedia FilmFest 2018.

In June 2019, he proposed to Abella. On January 23, 2021, the couple were married at Lemuria Gourmet Restaurant in Quezon City.

In December 2020, he made it to the finals of Philpop, interpreting the song "Balikan" written and composed by Lolito Go.

== Filmography ==
=== Film ===
| Year | Title | Role | Notes |
|---|---|---|---|
| 2017 | Throwback Today | Alex | |
| 2018 | Tres | | |
| 2019 | MOMOL Nights | Elbert | |
| 2019 | My Letters to Happy | Roy | |
| 2019 | Mga Mata sa Dilim | Ritchie | |
| 2024 | My Sassy Girl | | |

=== Television ===
| Year | Title | Role |
|---|---|---|
| 2015–2016 | On the Wings of Love | Axel |
| 2015–2018 | FPJ's Ang Probinsyano | Felipe "Pinggoy" Tanyag Jr. |
| 2016 | My Super D | Mario Brother 3 |
| 2016 | Wansapanataym: That's My Boy, That's My Toy | Boyet |
| 2017 | Ipaglaban Mo!: Testigo | Chris Cabrera |
| 2018–2020 | Kadenang Ginto | Felix Dimalanta |
| 2018 | Ipaglaban Mo!: Bayad | Pahinante |
| 2018 | Wansapanataym: ManiKEN ni Monica | Tailor Master |
| 2018 | Spirits: Reawaken | Simeon |
| 2019 | Maalaala Mo Kaya: Third Eye | Peachy's Ex-boyfriend |
| 2019 | Ipaglaban Mo!: Dayuhan | Temyong |
| 2019 | Manilennials | Jesper |
| 2020 | 24/7 | Otep |
| 2020 | Almost Paradise | Local Gang Member #1 |
| 2022 | Family Feud | Himself / Player |
| 2023–2024 | Linlang | Jimboy |
| 2024–present | ASAP | Himself / Host / Performer |
| 2024–2025 | Lavender Fields | Tommy |
| 2026 | Love Is Never Gone | Steven |
