= List of Ang Probinsyano characters =

FPJ's Ang Probinsyano (transl. FPJ's The Provincial Man / International title: Brothers) is a 2015 Philippine action drama television series based on the 1997 Fernando Poe, Jr. film of the same title, produced by FPJ Productions. It is top billed by Coco Martin, together with an ensemble cast. The series premiered on ABS-CBN's Primetime Bida evening block, and worldwide via The Filipino Channel from September 28, 2015, to August 12, 2022, replacing Nathaniel. It aired until March 13, 2020, on ABS-CBN, when the network suspended productions of its shows due to the COVID-19 pandemic in the Philippines and non-renewal of free-to-air TV broadcast franchise. It returned on Kapamilya Channel on June 15, 2020, and simulcasted with other network platforms.

== Overview ==
The story comprises five story arcs.

Book 1 (Syndicate Arc) which spans the first and second seasons, ran from September 28, 2015, to May 24, 2017. It focused on various crimes related to the powerful and corrupt human trafficking and drug ring of the Tuazon Family.

Book 2 (Rebellion and Terrorism Arc), which encompasses the third and fourth seasons, aired between May 25, 2017, to March 14, 2018. This arc focused on the life of Ricardo Dalisay as he tries to put a stop to the rebel group known as the Pulang Araw, and featured the return of his archenemy Renato "Buwitre" Hipolito. Cardo goes undercover in the Pulang Araw, and forms a vigilante group called Vendetta comprising former members of Pulang Araw and ex-prisoners. Vendetta's purpose is to combat corruption, terrorism, injustice, tyranny, and any other crimes.

Book 3 (Political Arc) premiered from March 15, 2018, and concluded on April 5, 2019. This arc consisted of the show's fifth and sixth seasons, which focus on the larger political drama in the Philippines.

Book 4 (Crime and Corruption Arc), opened with the show's seventh season which premiered on April 8, 2019, and sees the restoration of Oscar Hidalgo to the presidency. In response, a special task force is formed consisting of the former members of Vendetta, and led by Ricardo Dalisay. In the eighth season, Vendetta focuses on new threats from Lito Valmoria and Enrique Vera, while also sabotaging the plans to take down Cardo as a "criminal" by the corrupt and despotic First Lady Lily Ann-Cortez. She is aided by Secretary Arturo Padua, Cardo's long-time nemesis Renato Hipolito, and Hipolito's right-hand man Jacob Serrano. Cardo carries out a dangerous mission to save Hidalgo's life at the presidential palace.

Book 5 (International Arc), begins by showing drug lord Enrique Vera's death at the hands of Task Force Agila. Having avenged the murder of Audrey, the sister of P/Cpt. Lia Mante and daughter of Fernando Mante, in the final season Dalisay and his team eventually travel to the north to find a new hiding place. This season focuses on Cardo's new allies and enemies, as well as Hidalgo's journey to find Cardo's group and discover things from his past. Hidalgo reclaims his role as president once again, with Cardo and the rest of his group being reinstated, to put an end to their enemies' deeds. The series concludes with Cardo's taskforce taking on Renato, Lily, and Arturo.

Actor	Character	Seasons								
Actor	Character	1	2	3	4	5	6	7	8	9
Main characters
Coco Martin	Dominador de Leon	Main								
Coco Martin	Ricardo Dalisay	Main	Main	Main	Main	Main	Main	Main	Main	Main
Maja Salvador	Glenda Corpuz	Main								
Agot Isidro	Verna Tuazon	Main	Main							
Jaime Fabregas	Delfin Borja	Main	Main	Main	Main	Main	Main	Main	Main	Main
Arjo Atayde	Joaquin Tuazon	Main	Main							
Bela Padilla	Carmen Guzman-de Leon/Tuazon	Main	Main							
Albert Martinez	Tomas Tuazon	Main	Main							
Susan Roces	Flora de Leon	Main (Note: Susan Roces and Eddie Garcia are main cast members who are denoted as Very Special Role for the series.)	Main	Main	Main	Main	Main	Main	Main	Main
Eddie Garcia	Emilio Syquia	Main	Main	Main	Main	Main	Main			
John Arcilla	Renato Hipolito			Main	Main	Main	Main	Main	Main	Main
Angel Aquino	Diana Olegario			Main	Main	Main	Main	Main	Main	Main
Jhong Hilario	Alakdan Adlawan			Main	Main	Main	Main			
John Prats	Jerome Girona, Jr.	Supporting	Supporting	Main	Main	Main	Main	Main	Main	Main
Sid Lucero	Manolo Cantindig			Main	Main	Main				
Pokwang	Amor Nieves			Main						
Mitch Valdes	Gina Magtanggol			Main	Main	Main	Main	Guest		
Ronwaldo Martin	Roldan/Gagamba			Main	Main	Guest	Guest			
Yassi Pressman	Alyana Arevalo-Dalisay	Supporting	Supporting	Main	Main	Main	Main	Main	Main	
Edu Manzano	Lucas Cabrera					Main	Main			
Rowell Santiago	Oscar Hidalgo					Main	Main	Main	Main	Main
Rowell Santiago	Mariano								Main	Main
Jolo Revilla	Harold Casilag					Main				
Mark Anthony Fernandez	Brandon Cabrera					Main	Main			
J. C. Santos	Marco Cabrera				Guest	Main				
Ryza Cenon	Aubrey Hidalgo					Main	Main			
Francis Magundayao	Yohan Hidalgo					Main				
Dawn Zulueta	Marissa Hidalgo					Main				
Alice Dixson	Catherine Cabrera					Main				
Lito Lapid	Romulo "Leon" Dumaguit			Guest	Guest	Main (Note: Lito Lapid is a main cast member who is denoted as First Very Special Participation for the series.)	Main			
Lorna Tolentino	Lily Ann Cortez-Hidalgo						Main	Main	Main	Main
Shamaine Buencamino	Virginia Arevalo	Supporting	Supporting	Supporting	Supporting	Supporting	Supporting	Main	Main	
Bianca Manalo	Lourdes Torres-Girona				Guest	Guest	Guest	Main	Main	
McCoy de Leon	Juan Pablo Arevalo	Supporting	Supporting	Supporting		Supporting	Supporting	Main	Main	
Michael de Mesa	Ramil Taduran		Supporting	Supporting	Supporting	Supporting	Supporting	Main	Main	Main
Joel Torre	Teodoro Arevalo	Supporting	Supporting	Supporting	Supporting	Supporting	Supporting	Main	Main	
Tirso Cruz III	Arturo "Art" M. Padua							Main	Main	Main
Marc Abaya	Jacob Serrano							Main	Main	Main
Geoff Eigenmann	Albert de Vela							Main	Main	Main
Ara Mina	Ellen Padua							Supporting	Supporting	Main
Richard Gutierrez	Angelito "Lito" Valmoria								Special Guest	Main
Julia Montes	Mara Silang									Main
Joseph Marco	Lucas Catapang									Main
Roi Vinzon	Eduardo Guillermo									Main
Sharon Cuneta	Aurora Guillermo									Main (Note: Sharon Cuneta is a main cast member who is denoted as First Very Special Participation for the series.)
Charo Santos-Concio	Ramona									Main (Note: Charo Santos is a main cast member who is denoted as Second Very Special Participation for the series.)

== Main characters ==
=== P/Capt.(PS/Insp) (Note: Ador died with the rank of Police Senior Inspector. When Cardo was posing as Ador, he solved the child trafficking case the latter left behind following his death, thus promoting "Ador" to Chief Inspector. When the ruse was revealed, the promotion was nullified.) Dominador "Ador" B. de Leon ===
Played by: Coco Martin

Ador is Cardo's identical twin brother, and a police officer in the CIDG. He is raised separately from his brother by his grandmother, Lola Flora. He enters the Philippine National Police Academy (PNPA) alongside Joaquin Tuazon, and falls in love with Carmen, his classmate's sister. He graduates as the class valedictorian, and marries Carmen when she becomes pregnant. She gives birth to Dominador "Junior" de Leon, Jr.

Ador continues to display his intelligence and skill as a policeman, and is eventually promoted to Senior Inspector. He becomes a prominent and respected CIDG police official in Manila with a loving family. Early in the series, Ador is betrayed and murdered by Joaquin after pursuing the latter's child-trafficking syndicate, and Cardo is called to take his place, both as an officer and a husband and father of Ador's family. Later, in 2017, Ador was avenged when his brother stabbed Joaquin in the neck during a bloody fight in the rain.

=== P/Maj. Ricardo "Cardo" Dalisay ===
Played by: Coco Martin

Cardo is a police officer falsely referred to as a fugitive and the overall protagonist of the series. He is the leader of Task Force Agila (formerly known as "Vendetta"). He was separated from his identical twin brother, and grew up in the rural town of Botolan, Zambales with his best friend Glen, who secretly has a crush on him. Cardo joins the SAF as an officer. When Ador is killed, General Delfin Borja, Cardo and Ador's maternal great-uncle and the Criminal Investigation and Detection Group (CIDG)'s director, orders Cardo to assume Ador's identity and continue the mission his late brother left behind. As part of his mission, Cardo is forced to pretend to his brother's family and friends; and reunites with his grandmother, whom he resents for deserting him. He promises to find the person behind his brother's death.

After his cover is blown, Cardo reveals himself and reunites with his family. Cardo is reassigned to the CIDG and tackles various cases, some which tie directly to the Tuazon family's crimes. Towards the end of Season 2, Cardo kills Joaquin Tuazon to avenge his twin brother's death, and rescues his new wife Alyana after she was kidnapped by Tuazon during their wedding.

At the start of Season 3, Cardo and Alyana have a son named Ricardo "Ricky Boy" Dalisay Jr. and Cardo decides to quit the police force and settle down with his family. However, Ricardo is soon killed in the crossfire of a gunfight between the police and the rebel group Pulang Araw. This even forces Cardo to return to active duty as a PNP-SAF officer. As more of his comrades are killed by Romulo "Leon" Dumaguit, Cardo is the only survivor left as two of his comrades are captured. Cardo then takes on a new identity of Fernan, and joins Pulang Araw.

After Hipolito disperses Pulang Araw, Cardo, Romulo and former inmate Ramil Taduran co-found a vigilante-armed resistance group named Vendetta to expose Hipolito's crimes, treachery, greed and corruption in the Philippine Government, and avenge the deaths of their comrades and friends. Throughout Season 4 and Season 5, they successfully rescue various innocent people who were forced to work by Hipolito, as well as by the villanous congressman Brandon Cabrera and the Vice President Lucas Cabrera. The President of the Philippines, Oscar Hidalgo witnesses the group's rescuing efforts. Vendetta also rescues both Andy and Lorenzo at Brandon's house, after Brandon attempts to rape her. Cardo shoots Brandon when he is about to kill both Andy and Lorenzo.

After their missions during the elections, the vigilante group allows Cardo to fix his relationship with his ex-wife Alyana, and they elope to the North to fix their relationship. After their remarriage, the couple re-join the vigilante group to battle against Alakdan's group, and later against political corruption under Lucas Cabrera's administration. Vendetta are then framed as criminals by Lucas Cabrera.

In season 6, Cardo finally kills Don Emilio Syquia to avenge his father's death, while Vendetta and the people of Sto. Niño fight to save prisoners kept in a mine. Cardo also kills Alakdan Adlawan to avenge Olegario's son, Romulo, and Ricky Boy's death, and kills President Lucas Cabrera to justice for Makmak and Oscar's family. Soon after, Vendetta was granted a presidential pardon from their crimes by the returning President Oscar Hidalgo.

Cardo is promoted to Senior Master Sergeant and is assigned to lead Task Force Agila, a task force consisting of CIDG members, Vendetta members, and some new members of the PNP. Oscar and the PNP promote him from Senior Master Sergeant to Police Lieutenant after passing the lateral exam, then to Police Captain, the same rank as his twin brother, Ador.

During the opening ceremony of Flora's Garden someone throws a grenade, almost killing several of Cardo's friends. He takes his revenge by killing the perpetrator, Dante "Bungo" Madarang, who had also raped and killed several of Cardo's co-police officers.

In season 8, Cardo and Task Force Agila fight against the corrupt paramilitary "Black Operatives" (Black Ops for short), created by Sec. Arturo Padua because of the "shoot to kill order" against President Hidalgo. A day later, Cardo is shot in the middle of crossfire by Albert De Vela, the Black Ops leader. Alyana runs over to save her husband, but is fatally shot by Albert. Later, Teddy and Virgie arrive at the Vendetta hideout to find out that their daughter died, and become furious towards Cardo for Alyana's death.

After an argument with Lito and the Arevalos, Cardo leaves the group for his new mission, to investigate the Black Ops' whereabouts. He captures Lia Mante, a member of Black Ops, and uses her as a hostage. Meanwhile, Ramil returns to Task Force Agila and explains the truth about Alyana's passing to her parents. It is confirmed that Lito was the only one to blame for Alyana's death at the hands of Albert and Black Ops. Cardo vows vengeance for his wife's death, swearing to bring down both Lito and Albert.

Renato and Jacob ambush Task Force Agila in the forest, and Lia decides to join them to fight against Renato's group. Virgie and Teddy are killed in the fighting. All the other members of the group sustain injuries, but are able to retreat and escape. With nowhere else to go, Lia decides to help the group find a new hiding place for safety without being detected.

During the battle against Enrique Vera's group, Cardo avenges Audrey by killing Vera. In the aftermath, Lia and her parents leave the country for safety before the terroristic Black Ops comes to investigate the house and assassinate them for her defection and betrayal against her former comrades. Task Force Agila is also forced to relocate.

In season 9, after the departure of Lia Mante and her parents, Cardo and Task Force Agila find a new hiding place in the North (located in Vigan), where the local populace is unaware of them or avoids them. Task Force Agila inform Cardo about their upcoming plan, to put an end of their crimes to the government officials including Lily, Arturo, and Renato.

In the series finale, Cardo risks his life to save the country from Renato, Arturo, and Lily's terrorist acts, and is saved by Oscar as the latter finishes Renato off before his reinforcements can arrive. At the hospital, Cardo emotionally reunites with his family Yolly, Elmo, Wally, and the kids (Onyok, Paquito, Dang, Ligaya, and his adopted daughter Letlet) and they inform him about his grandmother Flora's passing, leading him to break down in tears. He and his family mourn the deaths of Flora, Delfin, and his fallen comrades who died during the final battle against Renato.

For his achievements, Cardo is promoted to "Police Major" by Oscar. He then decides to go back to Botolan to stay with his family back at home, and promises to continue his duty as a policeman and begin his new life. Later on, he is surprised to see Oscar and Aurora's daughter Mara at the same place.

=== P/MSgt. Glenda "Glen" F. Corpuz ===
Played by: Maja Salvador

Glen is a police officer and Cardo's childhood best friend, who has a crush on Cardo. She is later paired with officer Jerome Girona. Glen leaves the series when she has to return to her hometown of Botolan, Zambales, to take care of her ailing mother. Her character is described as feisty and boyish.

=== Carmen M. Guzman-de Leon/Tuazon ===
Played by: Bela Padilla

Carmen is Ador's wife and the mother of Junior de Leon. She works as a nurse. After she realizes Cardo has switched places with Ador and that her husband is dead, she despises Cardo and struggles to forgive him. She later marries Joaquin, but does not realize that Joaquin is the one who murdered her husband. When she learns of Joaquin's criminal activities, she is kidnapped by Tomas and tries to escape, but is killed. It was later revealed that her character was originally intended to only be on the show for eight weeks, but was extended. She later returns in the series in a brief appearance in Cardo's dream, begging him to seek justice for her death, along with Ador's. This causes Cardo to re-open Carmen's case, and investigate. Her death was finally avenged when Cardo killed Tomas in jail.

=== P/Maj. Joaquin S. Tuazon ===
Played by: Arjo Atayde

Joaquin lives a double life as a police officer and the son of a criminal syndicate boss. He is Don Emilio's grandson, Tomas and Verna's son, and Rachel's older brother. When his father was killed by Cardo, he succeeded his father as the new leader of the drug and human trafficking syndicate. When Ador starts killing Diego's men, he decides to kill Ador. He later proposes to Ador's widowed wife Carmen.

After Cardo dismantles the crime syndicate, Joaquin flees after he accidentally killed his mother Verna. In desperation, he successfully kidnaps Alyana during Cardo's wedding celebration in the same place where he killed Ador. Joaquin and Cardo fight, and Cardo kills him by stabbing him in the neck to rescue his new wife, avenging Ador.

=== Tomas "Papa Tom" G. Tuazon ===
Played by: Albert Martinez

The leader of the drug and human trafficking syndicate, Verna's husband, and Joaquin and Rachel's father. He was responsible for Carmen's death, and was later imprisoned after Don Emilio tipped off Cardo during a drug transaction. As revenge for his imprisonment, Joaquin and Don Emilio framedCardo for illegal drug possession. In the Bilibid, Tomas lived like a king and dictator. He and Cardo had several confrontations which resulted in deaths and injuries to several people. He later planned to escape from jail, but was stopped by Cardo. Tomas and Cardo had a fight which resulted in Tomas getting pierced by a metal pipe, killing him. His death causes Joaquin to become more vengeful, and vows revenge against Cardo.

=== Verna Syquia-Tuazon ===
Played by: Agot Isidro

Tomas's wife, Don Emilio's only child, and Rachel and Joaquin's mother. She does not approve of her family's illegal activities, and attempts to put a stop to it. She was accidentally killed by her son, Joaquin, when she tries her best to stop him to continue the family's illegal activities.

=== P/Lt. Gen. Delfin "Lolo Delfin" S. Borja ===
Played by: Jaime Fabregas

Flora's younger brother and Cardo and Ador's great-uncle. He is fired by Cabrera upon charges of conniving with Cardo and Vendetta. He is then tortured until rescued by Vendetta, Cardo and President Hidalgo. He is then appointed as National Security Adviser. Later in Season 9, he is betrayed, brutally tortured and was shot by Armando and his men as he sacrifices his life to save Cardo. Cardo and his friends avenge his death by killing Armando with their cars.

=== Flora "Lola Kap" S. Borja-de Leon ===
Played by: Susan Roces

Cardo and Ador's grandmother, Pablo's mother, and Delfin's older sister who had a past with Emilio. She is a kind woman and is always willing to help people without asking anything for return. She always serves her community and disapproves of corruption. Her and her family's rivalry with Konsehala Gina serve as comic relief in the series. She also owns a carinderia and serves food to the community, while also making a profit for her family. In the series finale, upon defeating Lily, Lucio, and Renato, Cardo breaks down upon learning from his family that Flora has died, and he and his family visit her grave and vow to honor her memory.

=== Don Emilio Syquia/ Señor Gustavo Torralba ===
Played by: Eddie Garcia

He is the leader of the mafia, human and drug trafficking syndicate; Verna's father and Joaquin and Rachel's grandfather. He is the recurring antagonist from season 1, and the overall main antagonist in Seasons 2 to 6. In Season 4, Don Emilio teams up with the corrupt Senator De Silva in their illegal activities. He also succeeds in capturing Cardo on their remote island to be tortured to avenged the deaths of his family. However, Cardo is rescued by Romulo and the remaining members of Pulang Araw. After Cardo forms the vigilante group Vendetta, Don Emilio and De Silva's groups attack the vigilante group by either smearing Vendetta's name or outright terrorism. In one instance, Don Emilio uses a former Pulang Araw member to bomb floats at Panagbenga Festival, only to be wounded by Cardo in a gun fight before the group kills De Silva after him. Don Emilio survives, but is wounded and blinded by the battle.

Later, it is revealed that Emilio owns the mines that Hipolito and Cabrera wanted to do deals with. At the mining site, he was finally killed by Cardo by shooting down his Airbus H125 helicopter, avenging Cardo's birth father Pablo de Leon.

=== PC/MSgt. Jerome Girona, Jr. ===
Played by: John Prats

Cardo's friend who has a secret crush on Glen. He later joined Vendetta alongside Soriano after they were wounded during their raid on Sampaloc. He fell in love with Bubbles after Alakdan raped her, making her pregnant. The two remained in a relationship until her departure after Alyana's death. In the series finale, he is accidentally killed by Ramil after Renato, Lucio, and their men, tortured and disguised him as one of their own. He and Task Force Agila are avenged by Oscar when he saves Cardo and kills Renato.

=== Alyana Arevalo-Dalisay ===
Played by: Yassi Pressman

A former news reporter and Cardo's wife, who harbors resentment over him choosing his missions over her. She has a new relationship with her boss Marco, who is later revealed to be the younger son of both Lucas and Catherine. Their relationship deteriorates when Marco displays violent behavior towards her, having an angry outburst due to his jealousy, thinking she still loves Cardo. She leave to stay with her parents, as her father Teddy protects her from Marco and his violent behavior. Later, she reluctantly accepts Marco's engagement after he gave her the annulment papers, but was taken away by Cardo to live with him in the provincial town to fix their relationship. She was initially angry at Cardo for being in the vigilante group, until he reveals that his group are eliminating wicked people who were involved in corruption and injustice and not innocent civilians. As soon as she stays with Cardo, she feels guilty for her actions knowing that she still loves him. While in hiding with Cardo, she reconciles with him and they rekindle their former love, later remarrying.

Alyana later joins Vendetta to assist her husband Cardo and his group. After being given a pardon, she decides to run for Barangay Captain of Bagong Pag-Asa and wins by a landslide victory. In Season 8, she was shot and killed along with Cardo, who is wounded between the crossfire of Task Force Agila and a Black Ops Unit a corrupt and reactionary faction. Her death was avenged when her husband kills Lito, and later when Task Force Agila destroys Albert's helicopter.

=== Teodoro "Teddy" Arevalo ===
Played by: Joel Torre

JP and Alyana's father and Virgie's husband, who witnessed Don Emilio killing Pablo, Cardo's father. He dislikes Marco due to his temper, and supports Cardo and Alyana getting back together. He later starts writing about Cabrera's abusive actions. However, in Season 8, when his daughter Alyana dies, he becomes very angry at Cardo for failing to protect his daughter, until Ramil reveals that Lito is the reason why Alyana died. Teddy and his wife then apologize to Cardo for their anger. He was killed by Renato along with his wife.

=== Virginia "Virgie" R. Arevalo ===
Played by: Shamaine Centenera-Buencamino

Alyana and JP's mother, and Teddy's wife. She has resentment towards Cardo for leaving Alyana, and wants her to marry Marco instead, despite that being against Teddy's wishes. She later tries to discourage her husband and son from writing criticizing remarks against Cabrera. In Season 8, when her daughter Alyana dies, her resentment towards Cardo grows again and she begins to side with Lito, until Ramil reveals the story behind Alyana's death. Virgie and her husband then apologize to Cardo for their anger.

Virgie is killed by Jacob after Renato and his forces are able to track them down before Cardo shoots him.

=== Juan Pablo "JP" R. Arevalo ===
Played by: McCoy de Leon

Alyana's younger brother and Teddy and Virgie's son, who has a crush on Lorraine. He appears and visits his family from time to time as he is currently living in Tokyo, Japan. He later settles permanently after his sister marries Cardo. He also helps his father research Cabrera's abuses and also involved in student youth activism and being active in university anti-government rallies.

=== Pat. Ramil "Manager" D. Taduran ===
Played by: Michael de Mesa

One of Cardo's most-trusted companion during his imprisonment. He is also one of co-founders of the vigilante group, Vendetta, as well as Cardo's right-hand man in Task Force Agila. In season 7, After being pardoned by President Oscar Hidalgo, he assigns him to become a member of an anti-terrorist group, Task Force Agila. In season 8, he is manipulated by Lito becoming his minion, but he reveals the truth about Lito's betrayal for assaulting Alyana leading for her death at the crossfire by Albert and the Black Ops. He returns to their group to apologize for betraying his own comrades, as soon he finds out the truth about Renato and Jacob coming to take down Task Force Agila. A battle occurs, and in the aftermath, the group had collapsed from their injuries, but were eventually able to retreat from Renato's men. In the series finale, Ramil and Task Force Agila sacrifice their lives for Cardo and Oscar. Oscar later avenges their deaths by killing Renato.

=== Brig. Gen, Diana T. Olegario ===
Played by: Angel Aquino

The head of the National Military Intelligence Group (NMIG) who thoroughly investigates the supposed terrorist attacks conducted by Pulang Araw and who later becomes one of the leaders of Vendetta after Maj. Catindig makes an attempt to assassinate her. She later becomes the wife of Romulo Dumaguit during their stay at Sto. Niño, until she becomes widowed when Romulo sacrifices himself to save her from Alakdan. Soon after Vendetta was pardoned from their crimes, she was reassigned by President Oscar Hidalgo to the National Security Council. In the series finale, she, along with the other members of Task Force Agila, sacrifices her life for Cardo and Oscar while holding off Renato. She and Task Force Agila are avenged when Oscar killed Renato, bringing an end to his crimes.

=== Renato "Buwitre" Hipolito ===
Played by: John Arcilla

Cardo, Romulo and Oscar's main archnemesis, and the final antagonist of the series. Renato is a power-hungry and tyrannical warlord. He was Romulo Dumaguit's former best friend and a Pulang Araw sleeper-agent who rose to the rank of Secretary of National Defense. In his term as Secretary, he orchestrated acts of terrorism through Maj. Catindig and Alakdan in order to boost his popularity, and transition to a seat in the Senate hoping to be elevated to the Presidency. It is revealed in the series finale that his partner and former nemesis Lucio was the one who created the bombs for Alakdan to use on the people, as means to stoke fear and to boost Renato's popularity, and in the process killed Cardo's son. When Pulang Araw learned of his treachery, Romulo tried to kill him, but Cardo prevented him from doing so.

In the senatorial elections, his nemesis was incumbent senator Mateo De Silva. He lost the election, but was appointed Secretary during Cabrera's presidency, and became involved in talks with illegal miners and loggers. During the shootout between him and Cabrera's group and Vendetta, wherein Cabrera died, he is shot by Diana but later recovers with the help of Lily who would later on become her new sinister and wicked ally. He becomes widely regarded as the most wanted criminal in the Philippines. Later, Renato joins forces with Jacob Serrano to further boost their business and take down their enemies. During the second half of Season 8, Renato becomes a free man and runs for the presidency against Lily. After Lily was killed at the raid in Tierra del Diablo her crimes didn't also end here but Renato has continued her horrific brutalities along with his new allies Lucio and Eduardo. In the series finale, he is successfully killed by Oscar after attempting to kill Cardo, avenging the deaths of Task Force Agila and restoring peace to the country. He is last shown spouting his delusions as he dies from his wounds sustained by Oscar.

=== Homer "Alakdan" Adlawan ===
Played by: Jhong Hilario

A corrupt member of Pulang Araw who does the bidding of Renato Hipolito by performing acts of terrorism with his splinter group, Kamandag. Their group was used by Hipolito to successfully frame Vendetta, to make the president believe they were behind the terrorist incidents. During the infiltration of the Vendetta hideout, most of Kamandag were killed by Romulo. Alakdan and his men pursue Cardo after he shoots Happy, but Cardo ambushes him. They fight, and Alakdan overpowers Cardo when he is knocked to the ground. He attempts to kill Cardo by stabbing him with a knife but is blocked, and is defeated when Cardo stabs him with a broken beer bottle.

Alakdan later awakens, and calls out for help for his wound. After surviving his wounds, Alakdan and his group continue to watch events, where Lucas is now the President of the Philippines and frequently berates Hipolito for his unsuccessful plans. Meanwhile, his group is sent to Sto. Niño, to hide in Gustavo's mines. During the battle and the fall of both Baldo and Tanggol, they successfully capture both Olegario and Bubbles. Alakdan also kills Romulo when he shields his wife from getting shot multiple times, and captures Romulo's wife. He later rapes Bubbles during her and Olegario's captivity in their hideout. When Cardo and Vendetta successfully save Olegario and Bubbles at Hipolito's hideout, Alakdan fights with Cardo. Cardo kills him by shooting him on through his knees and head, avenging Diana's only son, SP02 Bernardo Quinto, Jimboy, Happy, Romulo and Ricky Boy. In the series finale, it is revealed that Renato's partner, Lucio, was the one who created the bombs that Alakdan used to kill Cardo's son.

=== Konsehala Gina Magtanggol ===
Played by: Mitch Valdes

The kapitana of the town that Lola Flora and her family live in. Like the other villains in the series, Gina is also corrupt. To gain popularity in the barangay, Gina pretends to be kidnapped by assailants (revealed to be her barangay tanods), but is discovered when Wally warns Lola Flora and the others that Gina is pretentious and corruptive. She also serves as the comic relief in the series together with her sidekicks, Nick and Gido. She later becomes the councilor of the town after winning through cheating. She is also responsible for evicting Lola Flora and the others because of their sympathy towards Vendetta. In Season 7, she still continues to meddle with Cardo's family, despite the fact that Vendetta has been pardoned from their crimes and was commended for saving President Oscar Hidalgo. She later leaves the series to be imprisoned along with her group, for the assassination attempt on Alyana and Bubbles.

=== Major Manolo "Nolo" Cantindig ===
Played by: Sid Lucero

Director Hipolito's ambitious right-hand man who is plotting to take over the leadership of the National Military Intelligence Group (NMIG), and later develops a fierce rivalry with Alakdan over Hipolito's trust. He and his group cause a massacre in a hospital when they try to kill Romulo. He was hit by Cardo with a motorcycle to rescue Romulo. As a last resort, Nolo takes Andy as a hostage and is killed when Cardo shoots him.

=== Amor Nieves ===
Played by: Pokwang

Wally's older sister, and Cardo and his family's landlady and friend. She later leaves the series and her salon when she becomes engaged to her boyfriend. Her nail salon becomes under the management of Lola Flora and Marikit. Her brother, Wally, remains friends with Cardo's family through to the series finale.

=== Romulo "Leon" Dumaguit ===
Played by: Lito Lapid

The leader of the rebel group Pulang Araw, and later Cardo's second mentor. He later co-founds the vigilante and revolutionary armed group Vendetta with Cardo and Ramil Taduran. In Season 6, he marries Diana Olegario, and together with Vendetta they rescue the people of Sto. Niño from Tanggol and Baldo's bandits. He also manages to kill Baldo to avenge Aubrey's death.

When his wife is captured by Alakdan's group, he sacrifices himself to save his wife from being shot before his men manage to capture Olegario. He is buried alongside Aubrey's grave by Vendetta and the victims from Sto. Niño as Cardo vows to avenge Romulo's death.

=== James Cordero ===
Played by: Jay Gonzaga

Diana's secretary, who helps Vendetta in secret by giving them intel or gadgets. James becomes a member of Vendetta, and later Task Force Agila. By the series end, he is killed after being held hostage by Renato and Lucio's groups.

=== Marco Cabrera ===
Played by: J. C. Santos and Jared Pakseeda (young)

Catherine and Lucas's son, who is deeply in love with Alyana, and is madly determined to win her heart. Like his half-brother Brandon, he is very obsessive and violent if anyone expresses dislike of his interests, especially his violent behavior. He was also unaware of the corruption his father and half-brother are involved in with the Philippine Government. After Alyana was taken away by Cardo during his engagement, Marco was searching for her, thinking that she was hiding with Lola Flora or her parents. He later continues his search for Alyana's whereabouts until they return to Manila after she and Cardo are remarried. Marco is furious, and tries to kill them both, but is unsuccessful. He then creates his own group to disperse Vendetta, now fleeing their hideout pursued by the authorities. However, after a car chase, he is killed along with his group by Cardo and his group with gunfire, before Anton uses a grenade launcher to blow up Marco's car.

=== Vice President Lucas Cabrera ===
Played by: Edu Manzano and Rocco Nacino (young)

A corrupt Vice President, Catherine's husband, and Marco and Brandon's father. He is secretly the criminal who sells smuggled firearms to Alakadan and his group. He and Brandon are opposed to Marco's relationship with Alyana due to her being Cardo's ex-wife. He and Brandon support Hipolito for his ambitions to run for Senator, and they assist his campaign with illegal activities.

He becomes the President after successfully targeting Oscar and his family, begins his reign of corruption by convincing everyone that Vendetta are criminals and terrorists. He is killed by Cardo, ending his regime and avenging Makmak and Oscar's family.

=== President Oscar Hidalgo ===
Played by: Rowell Santiago

The President of the Philippines, Marissa's husband, and Aubrey, Mary Grace and Yohan's father. He is also the former best friend of Lucas Cabrera.

As President, Oscar witnesses the efforts of the vigilante group Vendetta, and is impressed. He has an intense confrontation with Lucas, who is engaging in criminal activity with Brandon and Hipolito. Oscar is rescued by Cardo in his wounded state following the ambush made by Lucas, and recovers from his injuries at Wangbu's house.

After learning that it was Lucas who killed his family in the ambush and took over as the President of the Philippines, Oscar joins Cardo and his revolutionary movement to stop Lucas and his administration and expose his corruption and crimes of injustices. He continues to fight with the group after Cardo rescues his daughter Aubrey from another of Lucas' ambushes. He later helps Cardo to rescue Borja and the people in Sto. Niño after they were being held captive by both Baldo and Tanggol's bandits. Oscar is distraught after Baldo kills his daughter Aubrey during their escape.

After Romulo's death at the hands of Alakdan, he was the only one to inform Cardo to continue fighting for the sake of their country. After Lucas' death and the downfall of his allies, he finally returns as the President and pardons Cardo and his allies. Later, in the seventh season, he falls in love and marries Lily Ann Cortez. He is then betrayed by Lily when she gives him drugs disguised as medicine to heal his headache, causing him to act violently and become angry towards his subordinates, including Delfin, Diana and Cardo, who think that they have disappointed him. These factors turned him into a short-lived villain during the second half of the seventh season.

Later, Oscar falls into a coma, and in the 8th Season, while in a coma, he realises his wife's illegal activities to establish a drug laboratory. He also realises that his wife had hired Mariano, who looks exactly like him. He wakes from his coma, and is informed by his guard Ambo that his wife was using him as cover for their illegal activities.

Oscar, Ambo, and housemaid Elizabeth flee the place to meet with Cardo in Vigan. Later, he is reunited with Aurora, his long lost love, and learns that his daughter is still alive. Upon reuniting with Task Force Agila, he and Aurora learned that Mara has most likely been killed. Oscar and Task Force Agila later confront Armando and fight Armando and his men, as General Borja reveals Armando's betrayal.

After Oscar and Task Force Agila honor and say farewell to General Borja, he and Task Force Agila work with Senate President Camilo Edades to expose Lily and Renato's plans. Before returning to the palace, he and Aurora declare their love for each other, and Oscar promises to make Aurora his First Lady. Soon, the final missions begin, and Oscar and Task Force Agila succeeded in defeating Albert, Armando, Lily, Lolita, and the rest of their supporters. In the series finale, he avenges the deaths of Task Force Agila by eliminating Renato and putting an end to his and Lily's diabolical crimes and saving Cardo's life.

After holding the funerals of Cardo's friends, he informs Cardo of the sacrifices of Task Force Agila and is soon joined by Cardo's family, who deliver the news of Lola Flora's death. He then promotes Cardo to Police Major, but Cardo informs him of his plans to continue his duties on his hometown in Botolan, to which Oscar accepts. Oscar and Aurora later marry (effectively making Aurora First Lady), but unbeknownst to them, Cardo would reunite with their daughter Mara.

=== Mariano Patag ===
Played by: Rowell Santiago

Mariano Patag was Oscar's impostor. He was hired by Lily to pretend to be the President while Oscar was still in a coma, so that Lily can take over the country through Mariano. Mariano is a perverted man, who makes Art's wife Ellen and Lily's niece Cassandra pregnant, and was once the subject of scandal when Art and Renato hired someone to seduce him and record footage of it.

Unaware that the president is fake, Cardo shoots him in Vigan and abducts him along with Ellen. Task Force Agila and Armando beat him up until he reveals that he is not Oscar. He is later killed when Lily detonates the bomb vest Cardo had placed on him

=== PSG Commander Harold Casilag ===
Played by: Jolo Revilla

The president's main security officer. He and Aubrey are secretly in love. He devotes his whole life to protecting the president and his family. During an ambush made by Vice President Lucas Cabrera, Harold was killed after protecting the president from a gunshot wound. Prior to the ambush, Harold was the only one who witnessed Romulo kill William Celerio when was about to shoot General Olegario.

=== Brandon Cabrera ===
Played by: Mark Anthony Fernandez and Miguel Esteves (young)

Lucas's son and Catherine's stepson. Like his father, he was opposed to Marco's relationship with Alyana and also works with his father to sell smuggled weapons. Like his step-brother Marco, Brandon angrily throws a fit if others criticize him. He attempts to rape Andy, which prompts Vendetta to hunt him, and he is shot by Cardo when he is about to kill both Andy and Lorenzo.

He survives, and is incarcerated in the PNP Headquarters until Lucas pardons him when he becomes President of the Philippines. He becomes SAP to Cabrera and continues the illegal business operations. He is later responsible for killing Mayor Adonis Dimaguiba in cold blood, which is witnessed by Margie who exposes him in the media as the perpetrator. He is later killed by Cardo, Alyana and the rest of Vendetta.

=== Special Assistant to the President William Celerio ===
Played by: Bobby Andrews

Oscar is unaware that William is secretly working with Lucas, as he does this to cover up their corruptive actions. Lucas and Hipolito attempt to kill him using Kamandag when they no longer trust him. When Vendetta tries to rescued him from Kamandag, he tries to shoot Olegario, thinking he would be attacked by the vigilante group. William is then shot and killed by Romulo to rescue Olegario.

=== Aubrey Hidalgo ===
Played by: Ryza Cenon

Marissa and Oscar's daughter, half-sister of Mara, and Yohan and Grace's older sister. Aubrey is placed in a coma after the ambush made by Vice President Cabrera, and it is unsure whether she will survive, until she moves her right hand. She recovers, and is later rescued by Cardo from drowning after they successfully foiled Lucas' ambush plot and reunites with her father, Oscar.

She later takes care of Rosa's children after Marie secretly hides them in their home, due to Rosa's maltreatment and abuse. During the gunfight between Vendetta and Tanggol and Baldo's group, she was killed by being shot in the head, leading Oscar to mourn deeply.

=== Yohan Hidalgo ===
Played by: Francis Magundayao

Oscar and Marissa's eldest child, the half-brother of Mara, brother to Aubrey as well as Mary Grace's older brother. He is killed in the ambush ordered by Vice President Cabrera.

=== First Lady Marissa Hidalgo ===
Played by: Dawn Zulueta

Oscar's wife, and Mary Grace and Yohan's mother. She was the last person to be shot by Terante's men during the third phase of the ambush made by Vice President Cabrera, and dies from her wounds after being treated inside the hospital. She dies just after her children, Yohan and Mary Grace.

=== Second Lady Catherine Cabrera ===
Played by: Alice Dixson and Sanya Lopez (young)

Marco's mother, Lucas's wife, and Brandon's stepmother. She was the only person who could calm her son Marco whenever he angrily throws a fit and contemplates suicide. Catherine arrives in the Philippines after attending a convention prepared by her husband Lucas. While there, various media reporters ask her whether Lucas and Brandon are involved in Lorenzo Alano's kidnapping. Like her son Marco, Catherine is also unaware of her husband's criminality, and so she angrily confronts her husband Lucas. However, after realizing that Marco is getting out of control because of his murderous personality, Catherine's only fear is Marco being killed in a violent incident.

She also discovers that her husband Lucas was talking with Hipolito and sided with him the whole time, despite knowing that he was involving the family in criminal acts against Vendetta. She later becomes vengeful and full of hate after Marco is killed. She later leaves the series to go to the United States, to recover from the trauma. Her fate after her husband and stepson's deaths is unknown.

=== First Lady Lily Ann Cortez ===
Played by: Lorna Tolentino

Also known as The Red Dragon Queen, Lily is an enigmatic bureaucrat. She is the mastermind of Cabrera's protection rackets, and she collects the protection money from the syndicates that are protected by Cabrera's administration. She is later married to Oscar Hidalgo and becomes the First Lady of the Philippines, until she betrays him by knocking him unconscious with an illegal drug. She is one of the main antagonists in the second half of Seasons 7, 8, and 9.

In Season 9, Lily announced her candidacy for President of the Philippines after her husband's presidency term has ended. However, her downfall came when Oscar and Senate President Camilo exposed her and her actions. In response, she launches a counterrevolution against Task Force Agila, President Hidalgo, and Cardo Dalisay. She is later killed by Cardo and Task Force Agila after holding Oscar hostage in a final standoff outside the manor. After her death Renato takes on her lead and has repeated and continued her brutalities with the help of his new allies Eduardo and Lucio.

=== Sec. Arturo "Art" M. Padua ===
Played by: Tirso Cruz III

The recurring antagonist in Season 7-8 of the series. Art is a former judge who convicted Tomas Tuazon for his crimes, and the one creating and supporting a paramilitary terror group known as the Black Ops. He becomes one of Cardo's main adversaries in the ninth season. He takes over Renato's role as the main antagonist in the first half of Season 9. He is later betrayed and killed by Renato and Lucio, while fleeing from the police.

=== Maria Isabel Guillermo Hidalgo/Mara Silang ===
Played by: Julia Montes

An assassin and a protagonist in Season 9. She is the long-lost daughter of President Oscar Hidalgo and Aurora Guillermo, the adopted daughter of Armando and Lolita Silang, and a childhood friend of Lucas Catapang. She was trained by her adoptive parents to kill her biological grandfather, Don Ignacio Guillermo, who was the reason Armando and Lolita's biological daughter died. She was thought to have been killed and thrown into the sea. However, in the series finale, unknown to Oscar and Aurora, their daughter survived and is reunited with Cardo.

=== Angelito "Lito" Valmoria ===
Played by: Richard Gutierrez

One of the main antagonists in Season 8-9 of the series. He is one of Cardo's strongest rivals for Alyana'ѕ affections, as she was his childhood sweetheart. Lito is cunning, rich and a tyrannical mafia boss. When an opportunity arises for Alyana's father to work at Manila as a reporter, Alyana joins her family, consequently leaving Lito behind, but not before making a vow to return to him once she accomplishes her goals. Lito is reluctant but eventually agrees. He tries his best hold Alyana to her promise, but Alyana chooses Cardo.

Lito is also responsible for conspiring with the Black Ops to get rid of Cardo and his allies, which resulted the death of Alyana who tried to save her husband from Lito after she sees Lito's true colors. In Vigan Airport, he shoots Cardo twice, seriously injuring him. In the hospital, Lito assaults an injured Cardo mercilessly, but Cardo finds the strength to fight Lito after reliving the pain of losing his beloved wife. After a fight on a bridge, he is stabbed and killed by Cardo.

=== First Lady Aurora Guillermo-Hidalgo ===
Played by: Sharon Cuneta

Don Ignacio's daughter and Oscar's first love interest. She elopes with Oscar to San Andres to start a life there, eventually giving birth to her and Oscar's child. Eventually, Don Ignacio finds her whereabouts and massacres the town, killing a majority of the residents. To keep her from Oscar, Ignacio sends her to live in the United States. She only comes back to the Philippines after Ignacio is severely wounded by Mara. In the series finale, she becomes First Lady and marries Oscar. Unknown to her and Oscar, their daughter survived and has reunited with Cardo.

=== Ramona ===
Played by: Charo Santos-Concio

A leader of another rebel group, and Cardo's first mentor. She finds Cardo when he fights some goons to avenge his parents. She then teaches him to fight for human rights, social justice, and total peace and liberation of the country. She saves Cardo again after he kills Lito, avenging Alyana. When the Black Ops attack Ramona's base, Cardo helps her and her group to fight back. After the fight, she urges Cardo to go and find Oscar.

== Supporting / Recurring characters ==
=== Nanding Corpuz ===
Played by: Joey Marquez

Glen and Brenda's father, and Lolit's husband. He is a funny person, jolly, and always tries to lighten up the mood when everyone else is being serious. He, along with his family, leave Manila to return to his hometown of Botolan, Zambales to take care of his ailing wife.

=== Lolit Fajardo-Corpuz ===
Played by: Malou de Guzman

Nanding's wife and Glen and Brenda's mother. She doesn't approve of Glen's work as a police officer. She always gets stressed every time Glen goes on a mission, which sometimes results in her blood pressure increasing too high. She and her family later leave the series to return to their hometown, to help her recover from her illness.

=== Yolanda "Yolly" Capuyao-Santos ===
Played by: Malou Crisologo

Elmo's wife and Makmak's adoptive mother who treats Lola Flora like her own mother. She is also close with her grandson Cardo.

=== Edgar Guzman ===
Played by: Dennis Padilla

Nora's husband, Ryan, Billy, and Carmen's father, and Junior's grandfather. After Carmen's death, he returns to the country to live a peaceful life. He appears as a guest at Cardo and Alyana's wedding.

=== Leonora "Nora" Montano-Guzman ===
Played by: Ana Roces

Edgar's wife, Ryan, Billy, and Carmen's mother, and also Junior's grandmother. She moves to the country, but returns to attend Cardo's wedding to Alyana.

=== Ryan M. Guzman ===
Played by: Brace Arquiza

Carmen and Billy's younger brother who wants to be a cop like his idols: Cardo, Ador, and Billy.

=== Cita "Yaya Cita" Roque ===
Played by: Beverly Salviejo

The maid of the Tuazon Family who is Verna's confidant. She is killed by Tomas after attempting to reveal to Verna about Rachel's demise.

=== Benjamin "Benny" Dimaapi ===
Played by: Pepe Herrera

Cardo's sidekick (formerly twin brother Ador's) and loyal best friend. He is later kidnapped by Joaquin's men and was tortured, forcing him to lure Cardo to Joaquin so that he would be killed. When he saw Joaquin's men, Benny backs out and shields Cardo from getting shot. As a result, he is shot dead. His death is one of the main reasons why Cardo wants to find Joaquin.

=== Elmo Santos ===
Played by: Marvin Yap

Yolly's husband and Makmak's adoptive father. Like his wife, he is supportive and helpful to Lola Flora. He also has a close relationship with Cardo.

=== Brenda F. Corpuz ===
Played by: Eda Nolan

Glen's older sister, and Nanding and Lolit's daughter. She is the polar opposite of Glen; girly, feminine, and gentle. She and her parents always tease Glen about her crush on Cardo. Brenda later leaves the series to return to Botolan to help aid Lolit, her ailing mother.

=== Rachel S. Tuazon ===
Played by: Belle Mariano

Joaquin's late sister, Verna and Tomas's daughter, and Don Emilio's granddaughter. She is totally unaware of her family's criminal activities. Verna later reveals to her about Joaquin, Tomas, and Don Emilio's activities. She is later killed in an ambush which Apollo planned to get revenge on Don Emilio.

=== Police S/Supt. (Colonel) Roy Carreon ===
Played by: Art Acuña

Ador's former commandant in the PNPA and later one of his and Cardo's commanding officers in CIDG. He is Gen. Borja's trusted aide-de-camp who later becomes a reluctant protector of the Tuazon family's drug empire, in order to finance the medical treatment of his daughter, Rona. He becomes instrumental in the reversal of Cardo's conviction by revealing the dealings of Joaquin Tuazon. He is later imprisoned as a result. Roy is later stabbed to death by Don Emilio.

=== P/Cpt. Avel "Billy" M. Guzman ===
Played by: John Medina

Ador's brother-in-law, Carmen and Ryan's older brother and one of Cardo's allies in CIDG. He becomes both part of Vendetta and Task Force Agila with Cardo and their friends. In the series finale, he sacrifices his life with Task Force Agila while being outnumbered by Renato and his forces.

=== P/Cpt. Mark Vargas ===
Played by: Lester Llansang

A friend of Cardo in the police force.

=== P/Cpt. Francisco "Chikoy" Rivera ===
Played by: Michael Roy Jornales

Another friend of Cardo in the police force. In Season 7, he is killed by Dante, and Cardo and Task Force Agila vow to avenge his death. His death was indirectly avenged when Cardo shoots Dante before he explodes.

=== PS/Insp. Bernardino "Dino" Robles ===
Played by: Marc Acueza

Joaquin's friend and accomplice who helps to protect Joaquin's family's illegal businesses. He is later killed by Joaquin after his conscience starts to bother him, making him almost inform the CIDG of the operations of the Tuazon crime family.

=== PS/Insp. Gregorio "Greg" Sebastian ===
Played by: Rino Marco

Joaquin's friend and accomplice who is one of the protectors of Joaquin's family's illegal businesses in the police force. He is later killed by Cardo to avenge Benny's death.

=== P/MSgt. Rigor Soriano ===
Played by: Marc Solis

Cardo, Jerome, and Glen's friend in the police force. He becomes a part of Vendetta and Task Force Agila with Cardo and their friends. In the series finale, he is accidentally killed by Patrick after being tortured by Renato, Lucio, and their men by disguising him as their own.

=== Diego Sahagun ===
Played by: Ping Medina

A member of Tomas's drug and human trafficking businesses who attempts to expose their illegal businesses. He is later killed by Joaquin after attempting to tell Cardo that he was the one who murdered Ador.

=== Lorenz Gabriel ===
Played by: Mhyco Aquino

A former classmate of Ador in the PNPA who quits and later becomes part of the Tuazon family's human trafficking syndicate. He later branches out and becomes a member of a riding-in-tandem group. He is later killed by Cardo in a gunfight.

=== Alfred Borromeo ===
Played by: Lander Vera Perez

Teddy's Editor-in-Chief at the tabloid Ladlad. He is later murdered by Don Emilio's henchmen.

=== Lorraine Pedrosa ===
Played by: Elisse Joson

Jerome's younger cousin and Belen's niece, who has a crush on JP.

=== Belen Girona ===
Played by: Daisy Reyes

Jerome's mother, and Lorraine's aunt.

=== Felipe "Pinggoy" Tanyag, Jr. ===
Played by: Benj Manalo

Alyana's friend, who was a former cameraman turned reporter.

=== Mitch ===
Played by: Kiray Celis

Lorraine's best friend who had a crush on JP. She spreads rumors that Lorraine was using drugs to get revenge on her due to her and JP's relationship. She later reconciles with Lorraine after their falling-out.

=== Francisco "Paco" Alvarado ===
Played by: Long Mejia

Cardo's friend and Paquito's father who lives with Lola Flora and her family. He later becomes a jeepney driver.

=== Wally Nieves ===
Played by: PJ Endrinal

Cardo's landlord and Amor's brother. He is an adopted member of Cardo's family after Amor's departure, and he takes over the rentals. In the series finale, he and the family with Onyok reunited with Cardo after finishing Eduardo Kidlat Lucio and Renato. with Oscar and Task Force Agila. They inform Cardo of Lola Flora's death. After visiting Lola Flora's grave, he and his family with Onyok move to Botolan to be close to and to take care of Cardo.

=== Otep ===
Played by: Jeffrey Tam

A friend and neighbor of Cardo and his family, formerly one of Kapitana Gina's henchmen. He left for personal reasons.

=== Gido ===
Played by: Roy "Shernan" Gaite

A jeepney driver from the barangay adjacent to Cardo's, who became one of Kapitan Gina's bumbling sidekicks.

=== Nick ===
Played by: Pedro "Zaito" Canon, Jr.

One of Kapitana Gina's bumbling sidekicks.

=== Marikit Flores ===
Played by: Arlene Tolibas

The hairdresser and nail stylist hired by Lola Flora to continue Amor's salon after her departure. She later becomes an adopted member of Cardo's family.

=== Gaspar Romero ===
Played by: Gary Lim

General Olegario's bodyguard and driver. He was later killed.

== Introducing (Child Stars) ==
=== Honorio "Onyok" Amaba ===
Played by: Simon Ezekiel Pineda

Cardo's ward and Junior and Paquito's best friend, who looks up to Cardo and wishes to be a noble and honest cop like his father-figure. He later goes to live with his mother, Rowena, after Cardo leaves for his mission. In the series finale, he reunites with Cardo and the rest of his old family after the death of Lola Flora, and Cardo's final mission in killing Eduardo Kidlat Lucio and Renato. After visiting Lola Flora's grave, he later stays with Cardo and his family in Botolan to be close to him.

=== Dominador "Junior" G. de Leon, Jr. ===
Played by: Lei Andrei Navarro

Carmen and Ador's son, who is also Lola Flora's great-grandson, Cardo's nephew and Onyok's best friend. He then goes to live with his uncle, Ryan, and grandparents in the province to avoid further chaos.

=== Macario "Makmak" Samonte, Jr. ===
Played by: McNeal "Awra" Briguela

Yolly and Elmo's adopted son who is openly gay. He was killed by President Cabrera's private army after trying to protect Lola Flora, who they intended to kill by invading their house.

=== Paquito Alvarado ===
Played by: James "Paquito" Sagarino

Paco's son and Onyok's best friend. He, along with the family and Onyok, later reunite with their adopted father in the series finale, and inform him of Lola Flora's death. After visiting Lola Flora's grave, he along with his family move to Botolan to be close with Cardo.

=== Amanda "Dang" Ignacio ===
Played by: Rhian "Dang" Ramos

A child whose parents were killed and was adopted by Cardo and his family. She, along with the family and Onyok, later reunite with their adopted father in the series finale, and inform him of Lola Flora's death. After visiting Lola Flora's grave, she along with her family move to Botolan to be close with Cardo.

=== Ligaya Dungalo ===
Played by: Shantel Crislyn Layh "Ligaya" Ngujo

A child whose parents were killed and was adopted by Cardo and his family. She, along with the family and Onyok, later reunite with their adopted father in the series finale, and inform him of Lola Flora's death. After visiting Lola Flora's grave, she along with her family move to Botolan to be close with Cardo.

=== Kristelle "Letlet" Sandoval ===
Played by: Iyannah Sumalpong

A child whose mother and caretaker were killed, and is adopted into Cardo's family. Cardo and Alyana see her as a daughter. She, along with the family and Onyok, later reunite with their adopted father in the series finale, and inform him of Lola Flora's death. After visiting Lola Flora's grave, she along with her family move to Botolan to be close with Cardo.

=== Dexter Flores ===
Played by: Enzo Pelojero

A friend of Makmak, Paco, Dang, and Ligaya during their stay at one of their old houses before moving with his mother, Marikit.

=== Mary Grace "Gracie" Hidalgo ===
Played by: Heart Ramos

The half-sister of Mara, Yohan and Aubrey's younger sister, and Marissa and Oscar's daughter. She is oblivious of the events happening around her. She is later shot by Vice President Cabrera's men, and dies in hospital minutes later.

== See also ==
- List of Ang Probinsyano guest stars
- List of Ang Probinsyano episodes
