= List of Ang Probinsyano seasons =

FPJ's Ang Probinsyano (transl. FPJ's The Provincial Man / International title: Brothers) is a 2015 Philippine action drama television series, based on the 1997 Fernando Poe Jr. film of the same title, courtesy of FPJ Productions. Directed by Malu L. Sevilla, Avel E. Sunpongco, Toto Natividad, Richard V. Somes, Kevin de Vela, Alan Chanliongco, Ram Tolentino, Enzo Williams, Rodel Nacianceno, Nick Olanka, Manny Q. Palo, Darnel Joy R. Villaflor, Michael de Mesa Albert Langitan, Jeffrey Sonora and John Prats, it is topbilled by Coco Martin together with an ensemble cast. The series premiered on ABS-CBN's Primetime Bida evening block and worldwide via The Filipino Channel from September 28, 2015 to August 12, 2022, replacing Nathaniel and was replaced by Mars Ravelo's Darna on August 15, 2022. A total of 1,696 episodes of Ang Probinsyano have aired. The first 260 episodes are streaming online on YouTube with English subtitles.

== Series overview ==
Ang Probinsyano has five narrative arcs or "books". Consisting of 9 seasons throughout its telecast.

The first book (Syndicate Arc (Note: These are fanon names made by the wiki for the arcs of each book.)) ran from 2015 through 2017 spanning the first and second seasons and focused on the various cases Cardo encountered as a member of the CIDG, both related and unrelated to its main arc.

The second (Rebellion and Terrorism Arc) contains the third and fourth seasons of the series and focused on Cardo's encounters with the "Pulang Araw" (transl. Red Sun) both as a member of Special Action Force and undercover under the no nom de guerre "Agila" (transl. Eagle), and later as part of the vigilante group "Vendetta".

The third book (Political Arc) covers the series' fifth and sixth seasons and focuses on the larger political drama in the Philippines.

The fourth book (Crime and Corruption Arc), on the other hand, opened with the series' seventh season and chronicles Cardo's return to the police force and his continued efforts to fight crime and corruption in the country. This is followed by the show's eight season which sees Lily moving to consolidate her power as both the first lady of the Republic and leader of an international drug cartel in the Philippines.

The fifth and final book (International Arc) follows the series' ninth season, the Task Force Agila traveling to north in search for a new hiding place after killing the drug lord Enrique Vera, having avenged the murder of Audrey, the sister of P/Cpt. Lia Mante and daughter of Fernando Mante, in ninth season. The Mante family leaves the country for their safety. Arriving at the north, Cardo meets a woman in a motorcycle named Mara.

Season	Episodes	Originally released		
Season	Episodes	First released	Last released	Network
1	262	September 28, 2015	September 30, 2016	ABS-CBN
2	166	October 3, 2016	May 24, 2017	ABS-CBN
3	119	May 25, 2017	November 7, 2017	ABS-CBN
4	91	November 8, 2017	March 14, 2018	ABS-CBN
5	135	March 15, 2018	September 21, 2018	ABS-CBN
6	140	September 24, 2018	April 5, 2019	ABS-CBN
7	253	April 8, 2019	June 26, 2020	ABS-CBN; Kapamilya Channel
8	278	June 29, 2020	August 20, 2021	Kapamilya Channel
9	252	August 23, 2021	August 12, 2022	Kapamilya Channel

== See also ==
- List of Ang Probinsyano guest stars
- List of Ang Probinsyano characters
