= Ang Probinsyano season 4 =

Season of television series

Ang Probinsyano
- Season 4
- First version of Season 4's title card
- Starring: Coco Martin
- No. of episodes: 91

Release
- Original network: ABS-CBN
- Original release: November 8, 2017 – March 14, 2018

Season chronology
- ← Previous; Season 3 Next → Season 5

The fourth season of Ang Probinsyano, a Philippine action drama television series, premiered on ABS-CBN's Primetime Bida evening block and worldwide on The Filipino Channel. The season ran from November 8, 2017, to March 14, 2018, airing a total of 91 episodes, making it the shortest season of the series. The series stars Coco Martin as SPO2 Ricardo Dalisay, with an ensemble cast of Susan Roces, Jaime Fabregas, Angel Aquino, John Arcilla, Jhong Hilario, John Prats, Sid Lucero, Mitch Valdes, Yassi Pressman, Eddie Garcia, and Lito Lapid.

The fourth season of Ang Probinsyano deals with the looming mid-year elections in the Philippines, where Senator Mateo F. De Silva and Director Renato Hipolito jockey for the top spot at the polls to secure the Senate Presidency, aiming to parlay such a victory into a career as the President of the Philippines. Both De Silva and Hipolito relentlessly hunt down Cardo and the remnants of Pulang Araw in order to appeal to the voters. De Silva funds his campaign with the aid of his newfound ally, Don Emilio Syquia, through their drug-trading business. With the remaining members of Pulang Araw and his allies in prison, Cardo forms the vigilante and revolutionary far-left group Vendetta to combat corruption, injustice, oppression, and despotism in the Philippines. However, with the elections drawing nearer, both De Silva and Hipolito continue to malign the name of Vendetta (through Luis "Buwaya" Mangubat and Homer "Alakdan" Adlawan's Kamandag, respectively), by instigating acts of terrorism that are blamed on Vendetta. Concurrently, Cardo's marriage to Alyana is put to the test as she is pursued by her new boss, Marco Cabrera.

== Plot ==
Cardo (Coco Martin) and the remaining members of Pulang Araw relocate to Manila with the help of Engelbert “Bert” Moreno, alias “Daga” (Rico J. Puno), and his family, though Bert’s daughter Regine (Angeline Quinto) resents Cardo for killing her brother Banjo (Eric Fructuoso). Cardo, Romulo (Lito Lapid), and Anton investigate Renato Hipolito’s (John Arcilla) betrayal of Pulang Araw and his role in the Manila bombings. Their attempt to kill Renato fails, leaving him wounded.

Senator De Silva is revealed as a corrupt politician funding his Senate campaign through Don Emilio Syquia’s (Eddie Garcia) drug operations. He joins Hipolito in hunting Pulang Araw, and Bert is later killed by De Silva’s men for refusing to expose their hideout. Pulang Araw rescues Bert’s family and avenges his death.

Don Emilio eventually captures and tortures Cardo on Isla Muerte, but Cardo’s allies, Ramil (Michael de Mesa), Julian (Julio Diaz), Gener (Jeric Raval), and others, rescue him at the cost of two comrades’ lives. Cardo then forms the vigilante group Vendetta with former inmates and Pulang Araw members to fight corruption and criminality.

Vendetta dismantles several drug labs owned by De Silva and Don Emilio, though Bruno (Janno Gibbs), Regine’s brother, is killed by corrupt police officers Gapuz (Raph Fernandez) and Pantig (Pocholo Barretto). Regine and her mother Dulce (Irma Adlawan) blame Vendetta and return to their province. Vendetta next targets Mayor Jethro Garrido (Bernard Palanca), who is secretly selling drugs to students. Cardo confronts him during a staged concert operation, resulting in Garrido’s death.

Meanwhile, Cardo’s marriage to Alyana (Yassi Pressman) deteriorates as she grows closer to her boss Marco Cabrera (J. C. Santos), who saves her from a kidnapping attempt. Feeling neglected, she ends her relationship with Cardo.

General Diana Olegario (Angel Aquino) attempts to meet Cardo but is ambushed by Major Manolo Catindig’s (Sid Lucero) men. Vendetta rescues her and brings her to their hideout, where she learns their motivations and ultimately joins the group after surviving another assassination attempt.

Vendetta stops Don Emilio, Senator De Silva, and Luis “Buwaya” Mangubat’s (Mitch Valdes) terror plot during the Panagbenga Festival, killing De Silva and seemingly killing Don Emilio. They then shift their focus to Hipolito and Homer “Alakdan” Adlawan’s group Kamandag. Meanwhile, Alyana begins a relationship with Marco, creating further personal conflict for Cardo.

== Cast and characters ==
Main cast

- Coco Martin as SPO2 Ricardo "Cardo" Dalisay
- John Arcilla as Director Renato "Buwitre" Hipolito
- Angel Aquino as BGen. Diana T. Olegario
- Jaime Fábregas as P/Dir. Delfin S. Borja
- Jhong Hilario as Homer "Alakdan" Adlawan
- John Prats as SPO3 Jerome Girona, Jr.
- Sid Lucero as Maj. Manolo "Nolo" Cantindig
- Mitch Valdes as Kapitana Gina Magtanggol
- Ronwaldo Martin as Roldan/Gagamba
- Yassi Pressman as Alyana R. Arevalo-Dalisay
- Susan Roces as Flora "Lola Kap" S. Borja-de Leon
- Eddie Garcia as Don Emilio Syquia

Supporting cast

- Malou Crisologo as Yolanda "Yolly" Capuyao-Santos
- Marvin Yap as Elmo Santos
- John Medina as PS/Insp. Avel "Billy" M. Guzman
- Lester Llansang as PS/Insp. Mark Vargas
- Michael Roy Jornales as PS/Insp. Francisco "Chikoy" Rivera
- Marc Solis as SPO1 Rigor Soriano
- Long Mejia as Francisco "Paco" Alvarado
- PJ Endrinal as Wally Nieves
- Benj Manalo as Felipe "Pinggoy" Tanyag, Jr
- Roy "Shernan" Gaite as Gido
- Pedro "Zaito" Canon, Jr. as Nick
- Arlene Tolibas as Marikit Flores
- Sancho delas Alas as Gregorio "Greco" Cortez
- Jay Gonzaga as James Cordero
- McNeal "Awra" Briguela as Macario "Makmak" Samonte, Jr.
- James "Paquito" Sagarino as Paquito Alvarado
- Rhian "Dang" Ramos as Amanda “Dang” Ignacio
- Shantel Crislyn Layh "Ligaya" Ngujo as Ligaya Dungalo
- Enzo Pelojero as Dexter Flores
- Joel Torre as Teodoro "Teddy" Arevalo
- Shamaine Centenera-Buencamino as Virginia "Virgie" R. Arevalo

Guest cast

- Lito Lapid as Romulo "Leon" Dumaguit
- Mark Lapid as Anton "Tigre" del Mundo
- Gene Padilla as Pilo/Tuko
- Wilmar Peñaflorida as Mando/Ahas
- Brian "Smugglaz" Lao as Marsial "Butete" Matero
- Lordivino "Bassilyo" Ignacio as Dante "Bulate" Villafuerte
- Rey Solo as Kalabaw
- Benzon Dalina as Barakuda
- Edwin Nombre Pamanian as Hunyango
- Michael de Mesa as Ramil "Manager" Taduran
- Julio Diaz as Julian Valerio
- Jeric Raval as Gener Guinto
- Jayson Gainza as Jimboy Escaño
- King Gutierrez as J/Dir. Pedro Ladronio
- Jun Hidalgo as Luis "Buwaya" Mangubat
- Harold Baldonado as Bolit
- Brando Legaspi as Jonard
- Joko Diaz as Senator Mateo F. de Silva
- Alvin Anson as Alvaro
- Gerald Ejército as Ronald
- Roberto "Amay Bisaya" Reyes as Ruben
- Vince Rillon as Victor F. de Silva
- Angeline Quinto as Regine "Jean" Moreno
- Janno Gibbs as Bruno Moreno
- Rico J. Puno as Engelbert "Daga" Moreno
- Irma Adlawan as Dulce Moreno
- Eric Fructuoso as Benjamin Joseph "Banjo" Moreno
- Ernie Garcia as Abdon
- David Minemoto as David
- Bianca Manalo as Lourdes "Bubbles" Torres
- Minnie Aguilar as Rebecca "Becky" Balaraw
- Anghel Marcial as Happy
- Joel Saracho as Dolfo
- Pocholo Barretto as SPO3 Demetrio Pantig
- Raph Fernandez as SPO4 Juanito Gapuz
- Lowell Conales as Drug Dealer
- Via Antonio as Sheila Dueñas
- JC Santos as Marco Cabrera
- Bernard Palanca as Mayor Jethro "Jet" Garrido
- Lance Raymundo as Lester Magno
- Matet de Leon as Menchu Versoza
- Teroy de Guzman as Pedro Salao
- JV Kapunan as Danny B. Nobleza (Student Drug Dealer)
- Sarah Carlos as Michelle G. Abad (Nobleza's accomplice)
- Jimboy Martin as Redentor D. Padua (Nobleza's accomplice)
- Patrick Sugui as Blake C. de Palma (Nobleza's accomplice)
- Jobert "Kuya Jobert" Austria as George "Wangbu" Espinosa
- Mara Alberto as Halina

== Episodes ==
No. overall	No. in season	Title	Original air date	Kantar media rating (nationwide)
548	1	"Bagong Mundo"	November 8, 2017	42.8%
549	2	"Kapanig"	November 9, 2017	42.0%
550	3	"Suportado"	November 10, 2017	39.9%
551	4	"Idinawit"	November 13, 2017	42.4%
552	5	"Pagbisita"	November 14, 2017	41.5%
553	6	"10 Milyon"	November 15, 2017	41.4%
554	7	"Magsuplong"	November 16, 2017	42.0%
555	8	"Bugbog"	November 17, 2017	41.4%
556	9	"Dangal"	November 20, 2017	40.5%
557	10	"Nadidiin"	November 21, 2017	41.2%
558	11	"Reward"	November 22, 2017	40.7%
559	12	"Ipagkanulo"	November 23, 2017	40.8%
560	13	"Magkahulihan"	November 24, 2017	39.9%
561	14	"Kondena"	November 27, 2017	38.7%
562	15	"Naghahabol"	November 28, 2017	40.7%
563	16	"Pagkakilanlan"	November 29, 2017	41.2%
564	17	"Pagtago"	November 30, 2017	40.5%
565	18	"Palatandaan"	December 1, 2017	40.2%
566	19	"Magtiwala"	December 4, 2017	40.4%
567	20	"Makita"	December 5, 2017	42.5%
568	21	"Tagubilin"	December 6, 2017	39.5%
569	22	"Magigimbal"	December 7, 2017	40.4%
570	23	"Damayan"	December 8, 2017	40.0%
571	24	"Nagluluksa"	December 11, 2017	40.5%
572	25	"Nakabantay"	December 12, 2017	39.8%
573	26	"Maninindigan"	December 13, 2017	41.3%
574	27	"Maglalaban"	December 14, 2017	40.4%
575	28	"Protektahan"	December 15, 2017	39.2%
576	29	"Personalan"	December 18, 2017	40.0%
577	30	"Pagkukunwari"	December 19, 2017	39.4%
578	31	"Imahe"	December 20, 2017	36.8%
579	32	"Kasiraan"	December 21, 2017	38.7%
580	33	"Kasiyahan"	December 22, 2017	37.2%
581	34	"Merry Christmas"	December 25, 2017	34.5%
582	35	"Noche Buena"	December 26, 2017	38.9%
583	36	"Mapagisa"	December 27, 2017	39.8%
584	37	"Hanapin"	December 28, 2017	40.1%
585	38	"Dinakip"	December 29, 2017	37.1%
586	39	"Maaasahan"	January 1, 2018	35.3%
587	40	"New Year"	January 2, 2018	38.7%
588	41	"Manalig"	January 3, 2018	38.5%
589	42	"Tanging Pagasa"	January 4, 2018	37.3%
590	43	"Binihag"	January 5, 2018	38.0%
591	44	"Nagpasimuno"	January 8, 2018	40.0%
592	45	"Pahirapan"	January 9, 2018	40.4%
593	46	"Susugod"	January 10, 2018	38.9%
594	47	"Pagliligtas"	January 11, 2018	41.6%
595	48	"Buhay Ang Kapalit"	January 12, 2018	42.3%
596	49	"Magkaisa"	January 15, 2018	41.6%
597	50	"Maghahanda"	January 16, 2018	41.6%
598	51	"Pagsalakay"	January 17, 2018	39.0%
599	52	"Vendetta"	January 18, 2018	42.0%
600	53	"Pagplanuhan"	January 19, 2018	38.7%
601	54	"Nalalaman"	January 22, 2018	42.4%
602	55	"Markado"	January 23, 2018	41.8%
603	56	"Bulilyaso"	January 24, 2018	38.7%
604	57	"Ibahagi"	January 25, 2018	40.4%
605	58	"Magtulungan"	January 26, 2018	39.6%
606	59	"Nangungulila"	January 29, 2018	40.2%
607	60	"Pasakitan"	January 30, 2018	40.6%
608	61	"Pagdadalamhati"	January 31, 2018	40.6%
609	62	"Sinisisi"	February 1, 2018	41.5%
610	63	"Ipaghihiganti"	February 2, 2018	40.5%
611	64	"Masundan"	February 5, 2018	41.3%
612	65	"Sargo"	February 6, 2018	41.9%
613	66	"Pagbwelta"	February 7, 2018	40.9%
614	67	"Paghandaan"	February 8, 2018	40.3%
615	68	"Rakrakan"	February 9, 2018	39.8%
616	69	"Pagtawag"	February 12, 2018	41.4%
617	70	"Pinaalala"	February 13, 2018	41.0%
618	71	"Puso sa Puso"	February 14, 2018	38.4%
619	72	"Peke"	February 15, 2018	41.5%
620	73	"Empake"	February 16, 2018	38.5%
621	74	"Maghaharap"	February 19, 2018	41.8%
622	75	"Ligpitin"	February 20, 2018	42.4%
623	76	"Prinsipyo"	February 21, 2018	42.0%
624	77	"Kapahamakan"	February 22, 2018	42.7%
625	78	"Nagsusumamo"	February 23, 2018	41.1%
626	79	"Pusong Nasaktan"	February 26, 2018	42.5%
627	80	"Bugso"	February 27, 2018	41.3%
628	81	"Naaalala"	February 28, 2018	43.1%
629	82	"Nagpasya"	March 1, 2018	43.1%
630	83	"Pagkatao"	March 2, 2018	42.6%
631	84	"Baguio"	March 5, 2018	41.8%
632	85	"Bakasyon"	March 6, 2018	42.0%
633	86	"Parada"	March 7, 2018	41.4%
634	87	"Masukol"	March 8, 2018	42.6%
635	88	"Cardo vs. Emilio"	March 9, 2018	40.1%
636	89	"Cardo vs. Mateo"	March 12, 2018	41.9%
637	90	"Nagkaisa"	March 13, 2018	40.9%
638	91	"Relasyon"	March 14, 2018	39.2%

Legend
Peak Season Rating
Lowest Season Rating
