= Ang Probinsyano season 9 =

Season of television series

Ang Probinsyano
- Season 9
- Second version of Season 9's title card, commemorating its 7th anniversary with the "Ang Pambansang Pagtatapos" tag
- Starring: Coco Martin
- No. of episodes: 252

Release
- Original network: Kapamilya Channel (on cable and satellite TV only); Cine Mo! (on cable and satellite TV only); A2Z (on analog free TV in Metro Manila only and nationwide digital TV); TV5 (on nationwide free TV stations)
- Original release: August 23, 2021 – August 12, 2022

Season chronology
- ← Previous; Season 8

The ninth and final season of Ang Probinsyano began airing on August 23, 2021, and concluded on August 12, 2022, on the Kapamilya Channel and Cine Mo! through cable and satellite television providers. It was also broadcast via a blocktime agreement with A2Z (on analogue free TV in Metro Manila only and on digital TV nationwide) and TV5 (on nationwide free TV stations). The season is available on demand via iWantTFC (now known as iWant). The series stars Coco Martin as P/Maj. Ricardo Dalisay, together with an ensemble cast, following the programme's sixth anniversary on air. The season also coincided with the programme's seventh anniversary during its final weeks on air.

First version of Season 9's title card, used until July 22, 2022, commemorating the series' sixth anniversary before its final weeks.

The ninth season centres on Cardo and Task Force Agila as they hide in the northern provinces; President Oscar Hidalgo going on the run with the assistance of two friends to warn Cardo, Armando's plan to eliminate the kingpin responsible for the massacre of his fellow farmers, the Black Ops' dealings with high-value targets under the supervision of Arturo Padua and Lily Hidalgo, Lito's illegal drug operations, Renato's continued pursuit of power, and Lily's efforts to undermine Renato ahead of the upcoming elections. The finale features the decisive battle between Cardo and Task Force Agila against Renato, Arturo, Lily, and their forces, aiming to avenge the victims of their crimes and end their oppressive rule.

== Plot ==
Cardo Dalisay and Task Force Agila hide in the northern provinces while First Lady Lily Hidalgo, Arturo Padua, Renato Hipolito, Black Ops commander Albert de Vela and drug lord Lito Valmoria continue to pursue them through terror-tagging. Meanwhile, President Oscar Hidalgo awakens from a coma caused by Lily and escapes the presidential palace with his friends Elizabeth and Ambo. He sets out to warn Cardo about the conspiracy against them, while an unwitting lookalike named Mariano takes his place at the palace.

As Lily and Renato compete for political control ahead of the presidential election, Arturo directs Albert and the Black Ops against their enemies. Albert later allies with Lito to eliminate rival drug syndicates, while Renato plans to permit an international drug organisation to operate in the Philippines if he becomes president.

Cardo’s group encounters Armando Silang, his wife Lolita and their adopted daughter Mara, who are seeking revenge against businessman Don Ignacio Guillermo for the deaths of several farmers. After a confrontation with Ignacio’s forces, Armando appears to ally himself with Task Force Agila but secretly plans to betray them for the bounty on Cardo. It is later revealed that Mara is the biological daughter of Oscar and Aurora Guillermo and that Armando and Lolita raised her as an assassin to avenge the death of their own child.

Armando and Lolita attempt to kill Mara and Task Force Agila to conceal the truth. Cardo’s group escapes, although Delfin is captured and tortured. Cardo is later wounded and taken to a hospital on Lily’s orders, where Lito attempts to kill him. Cardo defeats Lito and, after recovering, returns to Armando’s hideout. Delfin sacrifices himself during the ensuing confrontation, while Armando and Lolita escape and join forces with Lily.

Oscar and Senate President Camilo Edades expose the crimes committed by Lily, Renato, Arturo and their allies. Oscar is restored to office, Task Force Agila is reinstated and the accusations against its members are dismissed. Lily, Albert, Armando and Lolita retreat to the Tierra del Diablo estate, while Renato allies himself with warlord Lucio Santanar and his paramilitary organisation.

Renato and Lucio launch a campaign of bombings, abductions and attacks against civilians and government institutions. Renato eventually kills Arturo, while Task Force Agila defeats Lily and her remaining allies. Renato and Lucio continue their assault, however, leading to a final confrontation in which many members of Task Force Agila are killed. Cardo kills Lucio, while Oscar kills Renato after Cardo is wounded.

Oscar honours the fallen members of Task Force Agila with a state funeral. Cardo is promoted to police major but later retires and returns to his family in Botolan. Oscar marries Aurora, and Cardo discovers that Mara has survived, suggesting a new beginning for them.

== Cast and characters ==
Main cast

- Coco Martin as P/Maj. Ricardo "Cardo" Dalisay
- Julia Montes as Mara Silang / Maria Isabel G. Hidalgo
- Rowell Santiago as President Oscar Hidalgo and Mariano Patag (Note: President Hidalgo's body double used to prevent a succession in office during the real Hidalgo's absence.)
- John Arcilla as Renato "Buwitre" Hipolito
- Lorna Tolentino as former First Lady Lily Ann Cortez-Hidalgo
- Ara Mina as Ellen Padua
- Geoff Eigenmann as P/Maj. Albert de Vela
- Jaime Fabregas as P/LtGen. Delfin S. Borja
- Angel Aquino as BGen. Diana T. Olegario
- John Prats as P/Cpt. Jerome Girona Jr.
- Michael de Mesa as Pat. Ramil "Manager" D. Taduran
- Raymart Santiago as P/Maj. Victor A. Basco
- Shaina Magdayao as P/Maj. Roxanne Opeña
- Richard Gutierrez as Angelito "Lito" Valmoria

Supporting cast

- Joseph Marco as Lucas Catapang
- Tirso Cruz III as Judge Arturo "Art" M. Padua
- Marc Abaya as Jacob Serrano
- John Estrada as Armando Silang
- Rosanna Roces as Lolita Silang
- Tommy Abuel as Don Ignacio Guillermo
- Sharon Cuneta as First Lady Aurora Guillermo-Hidalgo
- Charo Santos-Concio as Ramona
- Susan Roces† as Flora "Lola Flora" S. Borja-de Leon
- Roi Vinzon as Eduardo Guillermo
- Raymond Bagatsing as Lucio Santanar
- Malou Crisologo as Yolanda "Yolly" Capuyao-Santos
- John Medina as P/Cpt. Avel "Billy" M. Guzman
- Marc Solis as P/MSgt. Rigor Soriano
- Bryan "Smugglaz" Lao as Pat. Marsial "Butete" Matero
- Lordivino "Bassilyo" Ignacio as Pat. Dante "Bulate" Villafuerte
- CJ Ramos as Pat. Patrick Espinosa
- Sancho delas Alas as Pat. Gregorio "Greco" Cortez
- Jay Gonzaga as James Cordero
- Nonong Ballinan as Ambo
- Whitney Tyson as Elizabeth
- Julian Roxas as Julian
- Vangie Labalan as Lucia Dueñas
- Michael Flores as Samuel Catapang
- Chai Fonacier as Cheche
- Elora Españo as Aira
- Rani Caldoza as Remy
- Rogerson Jimenez Pulido as Atty. Fred Santillan
- Nixon Mañalac as RJ
- Ruben "Kidlat" Pedrosa as Sebastian / Ka Bastian
- Paul Ryan Aquino as Paeng
- Tanie Capiral as Ditas
- George de Lumen as Mr. Babas
- Jared Gillett as William Calloway
- Resa Toledo as Ressa
- Alianna Duran as Delia
- Imee Casañas as Aimee Cruz
- Lally Buendia as Malacañang reporter
- Chase Romero as P/Lt. Castro
- MJ Reyes as P/Lt. Ramos
- Dax Augustus as Augustus
- Danny Ramos as Winston Cabral
- Val Iglesias as Turo

Guest cast

- Elaine Ochoa as P/Cpt. Victoria "Vicky" Cruz
- Paolo Paraiso as P/Cpt. David Alcantara
- Mark McMachon as P/Cpt. Cris Fabia
- Marela Torre as Thalia Gonzales
- Maika Rivera as Cassandra Jose
- Noel Colet as Acting President Camilo Edades
- Jerome Ponce as P/Cpt. Adrian Jimenez
- Jimboy Martin as P/Cpt. Jerry Abalos
- John Wayne Sace as Omar Cuevas
- Richard Arellano as Alfonso / Ponso
- Jonar Del Rosario as Bunye
- Erlinda Villalobos as Consuelo
- Michael Brian as Ka Berto
- Karl Medina as Kidlat

== Episodes ==
| No. overall | No. in season | Title | Original air date (Note: iWantTFC shows two episodes first in advance before it broadcasts on TV.) | AGB Nielsen Ratings (NUTAM People) (Daily Rank) |
|---|---|---|---|---|
| 1445 | 1 | "Bagong Yugto" | August 23, 2021 | 12.0% |
Despite the uncertainty of their future, Cardo and the Task Force Agila sets off to a new journey. Albert becomes eager to capture the group upon learning of the Mantes' departure. A woman riding a motorcycle crosses the same path as Task Force Agila.
| 1446 | 2 | "Pagdating" | August 24, 2021 | 11.7% |
Berting falls on the receiving end of Albert's wrath as the latter grows hell-bent on finding Cardo. Meanwhile, Cardo and Task Force Agila try to blend in with the crowd upon arriving in a picturesque place.
| 1447 | 3 | "Upa" | August 25, 2021 | 11.1% |
Learning where Renato will hold the 20-billion drug transaction, Lily sets a meeting with northern kingpin, Don Ignacio Guillermo. Still considered as outlaws, Task Force Agila wastes no time in finding a place to hide in.
| 1448 | 4 | "Paghihiganti" | August 26, 2021 | 13.0% |
Mara confirms Don Ignacio's scheduled appearance at the exhibit to her father. This fuels Armando's desire to settle the score with him as he recalls the injustice that his group experienced at the hands of the greedy businessesman.
| 1449 | 5 | "Angkinin" | August 27, 2021 | 10.8% |
Despite Lily's attendance at the art exhibit and his allies' doubts, Armando decides to carry out their mission against Don Guillermo. Delfin reminds his team to be cautious in their new environment following an unexpected guest's visit.
| 1450 | 6 | "Layunin" | August 30, 2021 | 11.7% |
Diana and Roxanne stumble across the police while running an errand with James. Convinced of Mara's abilities as an assassin, Armando carefully lays out his group's plan to take the life of Don Ignacio
| 1451 | 7 | "Pigilan" | August 31, 2021 | 12.1% |
Oscar, Ambo, and Elizabeth face great danger as Renato's and Lily's men chase them. Aiming to remove Renato from the seat of power, Art plans to use the Black Ops to prevent Cardo and Task Force Agila from helping the president.
| 1452 | 8 | "Habulin" | September 1, 2021 | 12.1% (3rd) |
With the country's future in his hands, Ambo is left with no choice but to make a sacrifice in a bid to shake Jacob off their tail. While preparing for her mission, Mara recalls the reason why she must assassinate Don Ignacio.
| 1453 | 9 | "Taguan" | September 2, 2021 | 12.4% (3rd) |
Knowing how precarious their position is, Cardo and the Task Force Agila discuss how they will remain under the radar. Deeply worried for Mara's safety, Lucas makes a desperate request to Armando. Oscar seeks out a longtime friend's help.
| 1454 | 10 | "Pag-asa" | September 3, 2021 | 12.1% (3rd) |
Oscar sees a glimmer of a hope when his friend pledges his help in finding Cardo. As Lucas broods over Mara's safety, Samuel talks him into obeying Armando's order. Task Force Agila's current situation begins to take a toll on Roxanne.
| 1455 | 11 | "Delikado" | September 6, 2021 | 12.0% (3rd) |
Despite the growing concerns of her allies, Mara remains determined to ger rid of Don Ignacio once and for all. Elsewhere, Oscar scrambles to escape with Ambo and Elizabeth when his friend's true color is revealed.
| 1456 | 12 | "Saklolo" | September 7, 2021 | 12.7% (3rd) |
Upon vowing to make Don Ignacio pay for his crimes, Mara hopes to restore normalcy to her life soon. Jerome finds himself in danger when he crosses path with a group of trouble-seekers anew.
| 1457 | 13 | "Takot" | September 8, 2021 | 11.8% (3rd) |
Renato and Lily grow threatened as Oscar remains on the run. While recalling how his brother's death led to a series of events that landed him in his current situation, Cardo remains adamant in stopping the people who plan to bleed the country dry.
| 1458 | 14 | "Katapatan" | September 9, 2021 | 12.1% (3rd) |
After receiving a call from Delfin, Flora prays for Cardo and Task Force Agila's safety. Albert finds an opportunity to test Vicky's loyalty to him. Renato's desire to seal his hold onto power grows as he suspects that Lily is scheming against him.
| 1459 | 15 | "Nababahala" | September 10, 2021 | 10.8% (4th) |
Wanting to regain Renato's trust, Jacob checks the place where the ₱20-billion drug transaction will occur. Finally letting her guard down, Roxanne opens up to Victor about the thing that worrires her most. Vicky decides to follow Albert's order.
| 1460 | 16 | "Kapit" | September 13, 2021 | 10.8% (T-3rd) |
Arriving at the site of the upcoming drug transaction, Jacob begins plotting his pieces to ensure the success of the deal. As Jerome's nightmare continues to haunt him, Cardo looks back on their never-ending struggle to attain peace and justice.
| 1461 | 17 | "Prinsipyo" | September 14, 2021 | 11.4% (3rd) |
Danger befalls Vicky after choosing her principles over blind obedience to Albert. Jacob uses his cunning to convince Mr. Parker into pushing through with the ₱20-billion drug transaction. Cassandra begins suspecting that Mariano knocked her up.
| 1462 | 18 | "Komplikado" | September 15, 2021 | 11.4% (4th) |
Taking matters into his own hands, Art presses Albert to give him highly trained Black Ops personnel. Showing no regard for Cassandra's feelings, Lily plans to use the former's pregnancy to control Mariano.
| 1463 | 19 | "Samahan" | September 16, 2021 | 11.6% (4th) |
As part of her plan to get rid of Renato, Lily heads north to meet Don Ignacio. Flora and Yolly recall the challenges their family faced in the past. Diana urges Roxanne to see Victor as an inspiration in their fight against injustice.
| 1464 | 20 | "Tiwala" | September 17, 2021 | 10.1% (4th) |
Cardo and Task Force Agila manages to examine the area in the North, in case of emergency. Meanwhile, Delfin shares with his allies about being a good employee to the Palace he had with Oscar.
| 1465 | 21 | "Pagsuway" | September 20, 2021 | 10.7% (4th) |
Lily's preoccupation with her impending transaction with Don Ignacio tests Art's patience. Blinded by his thirst for revenge, Samuel arrives at a precarious decision.
| 1466 | 22 | "Ambush" | September 21, 2021 | 11.7% (4th) |
Despite knowing that he is putting Armando's plans in peril, Samuel pushes through with his decision to ambush Don Ignacio. After hearing about the incident, Lily is left with no choice but to delay her schemes against Renato.
| 1467 | 23 | "Makasarili" | September 22, 2021 | 10.4% (4th) |
Unable to accept the fact that Samuel's selfishness ruined her chance to finish off Don Ignacio, Mara decides to take matters into her own hands. Wanting to prove Art wrong, Albert immediately heads out after finding a new high-value target.
| 1468 | 24 | "Hanapin" | September 23, 2021 | 11.4% (4th) |
Albert resorts to heartless measures in a bid to track down Jacob. To reunite with Mariano, Lily lets him and Art bicker over Ellen. Don Ignacio comes up with a plan to make his attackers pay.
| 1469 | 25 | "Patibong" | September 24, 2021 | 9.3%(4th) |
Cassandra is pushed to the wall further after attempting to convince Lily to let her terminate her pregnancy. Zeroing in on proving the Black Ops' worth, Albert and his men lie in ambush in a bid to eliminate Jacob.
| 1470 | 26 | "Wanted" | September 27, 2021 | 10.8% (3rd) |
Learning about Black Ops' latest kill, Art decides to pin the blame on Cardo to shield them from Renato's wrath. Oscar and his allies cower in fear as Lily's henchmen close in on them.
| 1471 | 27 | "Kalabanin" | September 28, 2021 | 11.3% (3rd) |
Renato reminds Ellen to keep Mariano under her control so as to keep them in power. Tension fills the air as Lily confronts Art for not participating in her search for Oscar. Albert vows to retaliate against those who are demeaning Black Ops.
| 1472 | 28 | "Kontrol" | September 29, 2021 | 10.1% (4th) |
Fed up with Mariano's rudeness, Lily hopes to rein in the fake president by pressuring Cassandra to tell him about her pregnancy. Oscar hopes to find Cardo soon as he and his allies find a place to hide for the meantime.
| 1473 | 29 | "Diskarte" | September 30, 2021 | 10.7% (3rd) |
Tired of being a pawn in Lily and Renato's game, Art decides to start moving his pieces. Knowing that he needs his position to eliminate Cardo, Albert sets his sights on another high-profile target in a bid to regain the Black Ops' honor.
| 1474 | 30 | "Presyo" | October 1, 2021 | 9.4% (4th) |
Lito decides to personally oversee a nearing transaction, unaware that Albert is relying on the deal to capture him. Desperate to salvage her position, Lily puts up a bounty and buys the loyalty of Renato's men in a bid to finally track down Oscar.
| 1475 | 31 | "Pabuya" | October 4, 2021 | 10.1% (4th) |
Barely reining in his burning rage, Albert plans to finish off Art once he exhausted the government official's use. Posting a hefty bounty, Lily orders a sweep of the metro and neighboring areas in an effort to capture Oscar before the night ends.
| 1476 | 32 | "Agresibo" | October 5, 2021 | 9.9% (4th) |
Lito insists on taking part in the ₱20-million drug deal, unaware of Albert's plan. Art begins to reconsider switching sides. Despite the combined forces of Lily's and Renato's men, the search for Oscar remains unsuccessful.
| 1477 | 33 | "Ligalig" | October 6, 2021 | 10.5 (3rd) |
Ambo and Elizabeth raise their guard as they try to keep Oscar safe from Lily and her men. Meanwhile, Ellen vows to win Mariano back, unaware that the impostor is rejoining over a new blessing in his life. Renato starts to worry about Jacob.
| 1478 | 34 | "Agawan" | October 7, 2021 | 9.9% (4th) |
Knowing how valuable her trump card is, Cassandra uses her pregnancy to prevent Mariano from seeing Ellen. With his sights locked on bringing down Black Ops' mortal enemies, Albert boosts his forces' morale before heading out to capture Lito.
| 1479 | 35 | "Transaksyon" | October 8, 2021 | 10.6% (3rd) |
Mariano comes up with a way to see Ellen without earning Cassandra's ire. Lito orders Winston to handle the P10-million drug transaction as he observes from a distance, unaware that the site is already surrounded by the Black Ops.
| 1480 | 36 | "Execute" | October 11, 2021 | 10.5% (3rd) |
Executing his plan, Albert participates in a speedy chase as he and his forces try to capture Lito alive. Lily asks Art to stop the Black Ops from pursuing her protégé, only to be shocked by the secretary's reaction.
| 1481 | 37 | "Pagtugis" | October 12, 2021 | 10.6% (3rd) |
Relying on numbers and efficient teamwork, Albert and the Black Ops successfully capture Lito. Finding herself on the horns of a dilemma, Lily considers rolling the dice as she does everything in her power to save her protégé.
| 1482 | 38 | "Palakasan" | October 13, 2021 | 10.6% (3rd) |
Unable to contact Jacob, Renato decides to cut his official visit short as a host of problems arises in his absence. Finding a way to escape, Lito resorts to threats after failing to tempt the Black Ops with his wealth.
| 1483 | 39 | "Tambang" | October 14, 2021 | 10.8% (3rd) |
Oscar, Ambo, and Elizabeth flee to a safer location as Lily's and Renato's men inch closer to finding them. Winston and Turo deploy their men to ambush the Black Ops' convoy, only to be later surprised by Lito's announcement.
| 1484 | 40 | "Sabwatan" | October 15, 2021 | 10.9% (3rd) |
Lito and Lily feel triumphant upon getting the Black Ops on their side. As their world grows smaller, Oscar and his allies receive help for their journey. Unaware of the turn of events, Art vows to eliminate his enemies once and for all.
| 1485 | 41 | "Pakinabang" | October 18, 2021 | 10.4% (3rd) |
As Art comes up with a plan to ignite Renato's fury toward Cardo, Albert resolves to play along with the secretary while keeping him in the dark. Together with Ambo and Elizabeth, Oscar attempts to make his way up north.
| 1486 | 42 | "Terminal" | October 19, 2021 | 10.8% (3rd) |
Oscar, Ambo, and Elizabeth run for their lives when Lily's men spot them at the terminal. Lito receives an unexpected visit from his new allies. Unless presented with proof, Renato refuses to believe that Jacob is dead.
| 1487 | 43 | "Palabas" | October 20, 2021 | 11.4% (3rd) |
While Art relishes in the Black Ops' achievement, Albert seeks protection from Lito as he pledges allegiance to the businessman. Renato goes after Mr. Parker but soon learns of Jacob's demise, vowing to seek vengeance.
| 1488 | 44 | "Kaalyado" | October 21, 2021 | 11.4% (3rd) |
Art takes advantage of a grieving Renato as the secretary offers to form an alliance with him against Cardo and the Task Force Agila. With more men out to catch them, Oscar, Ambo, and Elizabeth find help amid their struggles to evade danger.
| 1489 | 45 | "Reputasyon" | October 22, 2021 | 10.0% (3rd) |
Left with no choice, Ellen reins in her anger and decides to accept the fact that she has to share Mariano's compound with Cassandra. Renato vows to smear Cardo's reputation beyond repair as he seeks to destroy any obstacle in his presidential bid.
| 1490 | 46 | "Kampihan" | October 25, 2021 | 10.0% (3rd) |
Putting their interests above all else, Renato and Art plan to betray one another when the right moment comes. In exchange for being Lito's personal army in the upcoming ₱20-billion drug transaction, Albert asks the crime lord for a favor.
| 1491 | 47 | "Damay" | October 26, 2021 | 10.0=7% (3rd) |
Renato grows optimistic about his presidential bid, unaware that Lily and Lito are up to something. Lily finally tracks down Oscar as Ambo and Elizabeth attempt to raise the disheartened president's morale.
| 1492 | 48 | "Imahe" | October 27, 2021 | 9.9% (4th) |
Lito gives Lily a helping hand in finding Oscar as her hunt for the president remains fruitless. While they start to lose faith in Art, the Black Ops look forward to sealing another deal with Lito. Renato rejoices over his new public image.
| 1493 | 49 | "Seguridad" | October 28, 2021 | 10.0% (4th) |
Don Ignacio strengthens his security detail before setting out to meet with Lily anew. While Lito oversees her plans against Renato, the first lady seeks Art's help in a bid to secure her win in the upcoming presidential elections.
| 1494 | 50 | "Convoy" | October 29, 2021 | 10.0% (4th) |
Holding on to Thalia's assurance of his safety, Don Ignacio hits the road to meet with Lily. Meanwhile, Armando, Lolita, Samuel, and their men set out in another attempt to exact vengeance against the influential businessman.
| 1495 | 51 | "Sanib Pwersa" | November 1, 2021 | 9.2% (4th) |
After mentioning that he hails from the north, Oscar hints at the dark past he is trying to forget. Lily wastes no time in sealing an alliance with Don Ignacio, only to be put in a precarious position when seen by her opponents.
| 1496 | 52 | "Kompetensya" | November 2, 2021 | 10.3% (4th) |
The rivalry and one-upping between Renato and Lily heat up as the presidential election nears. Oscar reaches a risky decision. Albert receives the list of Lito's competitors in the drug underworld.
| 1497 | 53 | "Hiwalay" | November 3, 2021 | N/A |
Lito and Lily carefully map out their plans now that Don Ignacio and the Black Ops are on their side. While Oscar resolves to carry on the journey to north alone, Ambo and Elizabeth refuse to give up on him.
| 1498 | 54 | "Dahas" | November 4, 2021 | N/A |
Focused on his goal to restore the Black Ops to its former glory, Albert and his men neutralize the high-profile criminals in Lito's list. In a bid to smoke out their main target, Armando and his group attack Don Ignacio's allies.
| 1499 | 55 | "Unahan" | November 5, 2021 | N/A |
While the Black Ops bask in their moment of glory, Oscar, Elizabeth, and Ambo set out to find the Task Force Agila with their new friends' help. Elsewhere, Armando and his allies prepare for an all-out war against Don Ignacio.
| 1500 | 56 | "Exodus" | November 8, 2021 | N/A |
Cardo and Task Force Agila set out to find a safer hideout. Soon, the town is thrown into chaos as Cardo and his group fight tooth and nail on their way out. Meanwhile, a grieving man vows to give justice to his late brother.
| 1501 | 57 | "Labanan" | November 9, 2021 | N/A |
While Cardo and the Task Force Agila fight for their lives, Oscar, Elizabeth, and Ambo inch closer to the infamous group. An all-out war flares up between Don Ignacio's men and Armando's fold.
| 1502 | 58 | "Depensa" | November 10, 2021 | N/A |
Lucia sends additional forces to rescue Don Ignacio, who is fleeing from Armando's group. Albert and the Black Ops immediately head out after learning that their men are engaging Cardo and Task Force Agila in the north.
| 1503 | 59 | "Tanggulan" | November 11, 2021 | N/A |
As Cardo and Task Force Agila stop at nothing to survive their plight, Armando's group relentlessly pursues Don Ignacio. Finding a safe place where Oscar can hide, Ambo heads to the nearby town to find food.
| 1504 | 60 | "Engkwentro" | November 12, 2021 | N/A |
Task Force Agila are forced to hold some civilians with them while they try to find a way to escape. Mara finally captures Don Ignacio. Soon, Cardo engages in a standoff with Armando's group.
| 1505 | 61 | "Norte" | November 15, 2021 | N/A |
News that Task Force Agila is involved in a hostage crisis breaks out. Upon learning of their enemies' location, the Black Ops, Renato, Arturo, and Lito gear up for their journey up north. Cardo is presented with a chance to gain more allies.
| 1506 | 62 | "Hostage" | November 16, 2021 | N/A |
In the name of eliminating Cardo and Task Force Agila, the group's enemies set aside their differences. Armando stops at nothing to build an alliance with Cardo. Ambo learns that Task Force Agila is involved in the hostage-taking at Hotel de Oriente.
| 1507 | 63 | "Kaligtasan" | November 17, 2021 | N/A |
Despite the danger, Oscar insists on finding Cardo and Task Force Agila for the country's sake. Lily and Renato brew up a plan to finally seize the infamous cop. Flora grows more worried for her grandson's safety upon hearing the shocking news.
| 1508 | 64 | "Kasunduan" | November 18, 2021 | N/A |
Renato, Art, and Lily move quickly as they take advantage of the situation up north for their dark ambitions. Despite his allies' qualms, Cardo insists that allying with Armando's fold is the only way for them to survive their predicament.
| 1509 | 65 | "Sundin" | November 19, 2021 | N/A |
Despite Mara's doubts, Armando announces that their group will follow Cardo's plans. Despite receiving a direct order to capture his target alive, Albert remains adamant in exacting revenge on the country's top fugitive.
| 1510 | 66 | "Sugod" | November 22, 2021 | N/A |
Cardo's and Armando's groups make their escape as the Black Ops closes in on them. Oscar thinks of a plan to sneak into Hotel de Oriente unobserved. Don Ignacio tries to outwit his captors.
| 1511 | 67 | "Bintang" | November 23, 2021 | N/A |
Albert receives a harsh innuendo of judgment and rant after failing to capture Cardo and Task Force Agila. Desperate for the next move, Oscar decides to hide where he grew up in his childhood life.
| 1512 | 68 | "Suyurin" | November 24, 2021 | N/A |
Cardo's six nemeses confidently prepares themselves while setting their sights in the North. Ellen feels the gravity of guilt she chose to let go her ex-husband Arturo.
| 1513 | 69 | "Bantay Sarado" | November 25, 2021 | N/A |
Renato's image will be tarnished if Cardo and his group continue to escape on his own hands under his government position. Lily plans of overtaking Don Ignacio's resources.
| 1514 | 70 | "Rebelasyon" | November 26, 2021 | N/A |
Lucia blames Thalia and was threatened by her eagerness of taking the latter down upon learning that Don Ignacio is in critical condition. Elsewhere, a certain woman remains pensive as she approaches her home.
| 1515 | 71 | "Utang na Loob" | November 29, 2021 | N/A |
Cardo and Task Force Agila went to the lair of Armando's mansion. Mara and Samuel feels uncomfortable having the infamous cops around them. Aurora recounts her resentful past from his father which urges her not to go back to her hometown.
| 1516 | 72 | "Maniwala" | November 30, 2021 | N/A |
Mara continues to become doubtful towards the infamous cops surrounding around her family. Cardo finally hears Delfin's voice over the phone unaware that the latter is in the middle of danger.
| 1517 | 73 | "Kapahamakan" | December 1, 2021 | N/A |
Delfin recalls his situation of how he ended up being kidnapped by one of his old friends in his police force. Having a desire in claiming the bounty, Armando hides his motive to use Cardo for his wealth and power.
| 1518 | 74 | "Pangamba" | December 2, 2021 | N/A |
Oscar seeks a temporary shelter from his old hometown ready to go back to his long-forgotten bad past. Task Force Agila are suspicious of Armando's sudden growth of wealth.
| 1519 | 75 | "Duda" | December 3, 2021 | N/A |
Delfin longs for Cardo while praying for his safety to ensure his grandson will save him from the danger. Omar attempts to sneak by the bedrooms to avenge his brother.
| 1520 | 76 | "Dagit" | December 6, 2021 | N/A |
Lito forces to buy the real estate hectare which was already bought by Don Ignacio. Armando and his family fetch the Task Force Agila towards the hometown of the colonel unaware that the latter police plans a bad motive.
| 1521 | 77 | "Bitag" | December 7, 2021 | N/A |
Cardo successfully defeated the founding members and the colonel. However, upon seeing his grandfather and his friends, Cardo becomes courageous to fight for the rest.
| 1522 | 78 | "Tulong" | December 8, 2021 | N/A |
Coming for a helping hand unexpectedly, Armando rescues Cardo and Task Force Agila. Delfin, Roxanne, Diana and Victor were in a bad shape.
| 1523 | 79 | "Malala" | December 9, 2021 | N/A |
Omar remains blind in the true justice as Task Force Agila still propelled down from the gunfight. Albert uses Thalia to squish her a concrete information about Cardo.
| 1524 | 80 | "Tambalan" | December 10, 2021 | N/A |
Aurora takes off her flight ready to face for his father's worsening condition. Renato and Arturo wants to be the tandem candidates for their presidential race in the upcoming electoral campaign.
| 1525 | 81 | "Anunsyo" | December 13, 2021 | N/A |
Lily announces her presidential race in the upcoming running campaign as Mariano will be her endorser. Armando continues his plan by neutralizing Don Ignacio's allies completely.
| 1526 | 82 | "Pagbabalik" | December 14, 2021 | N/A |
Aurora departs from America to check with her father's critical condition. Oscar was spotted by one of his fellow neighbors that blamed him for all that is happened in the past.
| 1527 | 83 | "Balik Tanaw" | December 15, 2021 | N/A |
Delfin asks forgiveness to what happened to Cardo and Lola Flora, meanwhile, Aurora remembers her past relationship with Oscar.
| 1528 | 84 | "Magpasalamat" | December 16, 2021 | N/A |
Cardo warmingly thanks Armando for having all of his support and a trusted helping hand to the group unaware that the latter has a negative motive against the hero cop. Oscar went to the promised land longing for his beloved one.
| 1529 | 85 | "Pabayaan" | December 17, 2021 | N/A |
Cardo shares Armando's story with Delfin, Ramil, and Jerome, unaware that the latter has a motive to get the money bounds head for Cardo and the Task Force Agila. Meanwhile, Aurora is destined to see Mara lying down.
| 1530 | 86 | "Malasakit" | December 20, 2021 | N/A |
After falling unconscious during the brawl, Mara refuse to stay with Aurora's help in the hospital care. Lito finally introduces his protector to the Black Ops.
| 1531 | 87 | "Kadugo" | December 21, 2021 | N/A |
Aurora feels sad to her past relationship with Oscar which had been prevented by his father. Meanwhile, Albert joins Lito and Lily alliance to overcome enemies.
| 1532 | 88 | "Lapit" | December 22, 2021 | N/A |
Renato and Lily's official filing of candidacy ended up being competitive on each other to win for the elections. Cardo thanks Mara for saving their lives confidently.
| 1533 | 89 | "Ganid" | December 23, 2021 | N/A |
Mara and Lucas remain cautious to Cardo and Task Force Agila even helping them throughout their hardships only to prove their secured life. Meanwhile, a certain sibling of Don Ignacio is willing to take all his brother's wealth.
| 1534 | 90 | "Pag-Ibig" | December 24, 2021 | N/A |
Aurora is badly grieving to what happened by the loss of Oscar and their child from Don Ignacio's henchmen raid during the past. Don Ignacio apologizes for her daughter after stabilizing.
| 1535 | 91 | "Anak" | December 27, 2021 | N/A |
Lucas and Samuel attempt to overcome Cardo and Task Force Agila's leadership by not trusting them at all cost whatever it may happen. Due to the loss of their lives from the darker past, Armando and Lolita reveal that Mara was their adopted daughter and the biological one to Aurora and Oscar.
| 1536 | 92 | "Kikilos" | December 28, 2021 | N/A |
Omar vows to seek revenge against Cardo and Task Force Agila by using the combatants from Black Ops. Having heard from the latest news report, Armando becomes alert after seeing Arturo running for the highest position.
| 1537 | 93 | "Api" | December 29, 2021 | N/A |
Lito gets a chance to crawl upon stealing Don Ignacio's prime estate properties as he will own its resources. Lily and Aurora finally confronted to pay a visit for Don Ignacio's recovery.
| 1538 | 94 | "Ungkatan" | December 30, 2021 | N/A |
Lily feels disappointed after Don Ignacio's condition to speed up tracking Cardo's whereabouts for their promised strong alliance. Renato and Arturo convinces Lily to rejoin their side.
| 1539 | 95 | "Magtulungan" | December 31, 2021 | N/A |
Eduardo was prohibited by his brother Don Ignacio at the hospital after being wasting his money through gambling. As Victor, Roxanne, and Diana regained consciousness, the group is preparing for the war against their nemeses allying with Armando.
| 1540 | 96 | "Kaibigan" | January 3, 2022 | 9.9% |
Don Ignacio comes up with his condition to race whosever will bring Cardo's head to support a certain presidential candidate. Meanwhile, Armando was asked for assistance by their farmer neighbors after learning that they were being abused.
| 1541 | 97 | "Hiling" | January 4, 2022 | 10.0% |
Upon learning of her foes' visit to Don Ignacio, Lily gives Lito her go signal for their evil plan against the northern kingpin. Aurora receives a piece of shocking news about her father. With Cardo on his side, Armando vows to avenge the farmers.
| 1542 | 98 | "Desperado" | January 5, 2022 | 9.4% |
Sore after Mariano beats her, Ellen desperately crawls back to Arturo's side. Task Force Agila and Armando's fold discuss the best way to rescue the kidnapped farmers. Bastian is left with no choice but to help Oscar.
| 1543 | 99 | "Dasal" | January 6, 2022 | 9.6% |
Aurora crosses paths with Mara as both of them pray and surrender their problems to God. With Lily soaring in the surveys, Renato plans to use Mariano's weaknesses to snatch the lead from the First Lady.
| 1544 | 100 | "Alok" | January 7, 2022 | 9.0% |
Seeing that everything she worked hard for will inevitably go to Aurora, Thalia accepts Albert's offer. In a bid to shoot down Lily, Renato and Art tempt a palace employee to do dirty work that will drag Mariano into the mire.
| 1545 | 101 | "Pakana" | January 10, 2022 | 10.4% |
Playing the long con in a bid to seize his brother's fortunes, Eduardo sets up a simple ploy to regain Ignacio's trust. While fuming with rage, Lily immediately calls for a press conference to manage the crisis Mariano created.
| 1546 | 102 | "Tagapagmana" | January 11, 2022 | 10.0% |
Aurora accepts his father's offer to handle one of his businesses with no choice. Renato and Arturo continue to watch the funny show of Lily being mad at the dirty plot that Mariano messed up.
| 1547 | 103 | "Karibal" | January 12, 2022 | 10.5% |
Armando recounts his rivalry in romantic relationship to Aurora and Oscar which ended impaled his warm heart to seek revenge. Lily outsmarted Renato's plot by hostaging the baiter.
| 1548 | 104 | "Ahas" | January 13, 2022 | 10.3% |
Foregoing to destroy Don Ignacio's pillars, Lito and Black Ops neutralizes the businessmen. Eduardo won the heart of his brother to continue his hidden agenda.
| 1549 | 105 | "Kasiraan" | January 14, 2022 | 10.5% |
Prior to Mariano's messy action from the trending video scandal, Oscar explained to his neighbors in the North an eye-opener, the truth of the government's scale. Task Force Agila loses their hope again as their nemeses are unstoppable from running big positions.
| 1550 | 106 | "Sulot" | January 17, 2022 | 9.6% |
Don Ignacio becomes doubtful in his security upon knowing that his businessmen were badly defeated in a single day as Eduardo is appointed to close the case. In hopes for the sake of his bid, Renato vows to snatch back Lito's billionaire transaction.
| 1551 | 107 | "Samantala" | January 18, 2022 | 10.2% |
Eduardo's henchmen succeed on captivating the individual who stole his brother's estate property. Oscar assigns Ambo a very important task to fight for the right of their beloved hometown.
| 1552 | 108 | "Pakiusap" | January 19, 2022 | 10.7% |
Arturo and Lily failed to change Don Ignacio's important condition only to endorse a certain presidential candidate. Meanwhile, Eduardo receives a bothering news as to when his brother's businessmen were murdered.
| 1553 | 109 | "Banggain" | January 20, 2022 | 11.3% |
For successful illegal operations in the future, Lito closes the deal with the foreign drug lord in a golden time. Eduardo is in the progress of hunting Lito for his brother's sake to gain another trust despite being lacking.
| 1554 | 110 | "Bwelta" | January 21, 2022 (Note: Starting January 21, 2022, the advance episodes of this series will be temporarily unavailable due to post production delays.) | N/A |
To ease the worst case scenario, Lily insists that Ellen stay away from Mariano's side and remain locked inside his villa. Eduardo continues to catch Lito after failing in their first ambush attempt.
| 1555 | 111 | "Lason" | January 24, 2022 | 10.5% |
A discussion is held between Cardo and Task Force Agila on how to deal with their nemesis one by one. Meanwhile, unbeknownst to the group, Samuel attempts mixing a poison on the cooking food.
| 1556 | 112 | "Pahamak" | January 25, 2022 | 10.1% |
As being ready for the prepared food, other members of Task Force Agila feel discomfort after eating the cooked food. Armando remains faithful towards Cardo in handling another chaotic mission against Don Ignacio.
| 1557 | 113 | "Kasamaan" | January 26, 2022 | 11.8% |
Only to squeeze an important information about Lito's whereabouts, Eduardo tests Mr. Calloway's courage to death. Armando concludes that Samuel is worth responsible for poisoning the food by the kitchen.
| 1558 | 114 | "Intensyon" | January 27, 2022 | 11.5% |
Seeking for a speeding up of escape plan, Cassandra tells the truth to Ellen about Clarice's demise that Lily was responsible for it. After being approached by a hero cop's attention, Mara copes up with Cardo's lonely hour in the seashore.
| 1559 | 115 | "Tagapagligtas" | January 28, 2022 | 10.9% |
Oscar courageously makes an appearance to the neighbors of San Andres to convince fighting for their homeland. The Task Force Agila and Armando's fold are ready to rescue the kidnapped farmers.
| 1560 | 116 | "Magkaisa" | January 31, 2022 | 11.4% |
To ensure their win, Renato and Arturo try to secure the support of the second-highest official in the country, unaware that Lily has gained a powerful ally. Armando's gang and Task Force Agila arrive at the site of their rescue mission.
| 1561 | 117 | "Pangunahan" | February 1, 2022 | 11.8% |
Lily closes the deal with the Senate President to ignore Renato's side for the upcoming elections in the few months. As Task Force Agila runs smoothly towards the basement operation, Samuel destroys Cardo's plan by starting gunshots.
| 1562 | 118 | "Salpukan" | February 2, 2022 | 12.2% (2nd) |
Despite the success of the rescue operation, gloom soon takes over as Task Force Agila and Armando's fold realize that they are way too late. Refusing to be overshadowed, Samuel confronts Armando for favoring Cardo too much.
| 1563 | 119 | "Paumanhin" | February 3, 2022 | 12.7% (2nd) |
Samuel leads a hungry fight to box with Cardo with Lucas joining his brother's side. Delfin reprimands the Task Force Agila for joining the rumble. Armando gives Samuel a last chance to blend with Cardo for good.
| 1564 | 120 | "Magpanggap" | February 4, 2022 | 11.6% |
Lucas and Samuel slowly gaining trust with the Task Force Agila only to pretend being a nice henchmen of Armando. Ellen and Cassandra failed to escape the villa from Mariano's harsh lockdown.
| 1565 | 121 | "Hangarin" | February 7, 2022 | 11.0% |
Ambo accepts a new responsibility for the people of San Andres. Not wanting to return to his old life, Armando thinks of a way to continue his reign. Eduardo vows to get rid of Cardo for Don Ignacio's sake.
| 1566 | 122 | "Politika" | February 8, 2022 | 10.5% |
Armando reveals to Mara and Samuel that he is capable of running in political positions to strengthen their influence in the North. Lily makes use of her plan to separate with Renato's grand setup interview.
| 1567 | 123 | "Pamumuno" | February 9, 2022 | 11.3% |
As the presidential election nears, Cardo explains to his allies why they must do everything to stop Lily and Renato from taking Oscar's post. Ambo stands his ground as armed men threaten the residents of San Andres.
| 1568 | 124 | "Konektado" | February 10, 2022 | 11.4% |
Following the condition has changed between Don Ignacio and Lily, the First Lady discovers Oscar's past life in the North. The fishermen seeks assistance from Oscar against the trespassing of the foreign ships.
| 1569 | 125 | "Paninira" | February 11, 2022 | 9.6% |
Renato and Art use their troll farms to rev up their smear campaign against Lily. Soon, the warring candidates gear up for a debate. The farmers visit Armando's mansion with their produce to show their gratitude.
| 1570 | 126 | "Debate" | February 14, 2022 | 10.4% |
Renato and Lily voices out their rebuttal platforms as they oppose each other in an official presidential debate. Cardo and Task Force Agila expresses their opinions on the ongoing debate trying to understand the evil scheme of the candidates.
| 1571 | 127 | "Bangayan" | February 15, 2022 | 10.6% |
Lily and Renato find themselves in a tug-of-war over the presidential palace when another scandal involving Mariano and Art erupts. Amid hopes of saving the country, Oscar tries to help his struggling community.
| 1572 | 128 | "Kalat" | February 16, 2022 | 10.4% |
Renato and Lily both bothered and doubt of maintaining their good image for the upcoming elections from what Mariano created another trouble in the Palace.
| 1573 | 129 | "Umaasa" | February 17, 2022 | 11.0% |
Oscar becomes an eye opener to San Andres informing how corruptive the running officials are and his current situation in the process. Mara realizes that the Task Force Agila share the same with her family's principles.
| 1574 | 130 | "Tuso" | February 18, 2022 | 9.6% |
Lily makes use of her only choice by making Don Ignacio impress her consolidation after Renato's attack. Eduardo successfully breached Mr. Calloway's drug transaction with Lito only to give the wealth on the other party.
| 1575 | 131 | "Sakim" | February 21, 2022 | 10.3% |
Eduardo fails his mission he carries to end Lito's reigning brawl in the North. Goes for a desperate move, Eduardo abducts Aurora for ransom swearing his sweetest dream to snatch the wealth of his brother.
| 1576 | 132 | "Dukot" | February 22, 2022 | 10.5% |
To maintain defended by his mortal enemies, Arturo forges a secret alliance with the Senate President. Aurora attempts to escape in the hideout where she was brought to be kidnapped by his uncle.
| 1577 | 133 | "Bihag" | February 23, 2022 | 10.7% |
Easily following the plan, Eduardo hides himself over the mask in the dark to spectate Aurora as the fake Lito. Aurora prays for her safety in enlightenment of her life giving another chance to survive.
| 1578 | 134 | "Ransom" | February 24, 2022 | 10.0% |
Eduardo takes a pretentious move against his brother by regaining his trust in a certain condition. Aurora continues to find a way to escape the puzzling location.
| 1579 | 135 | "Salisi" | February 25, 2022 | 10.2% |
Aurora takes an advantage to lure the goons from her plans on the way of her escaping. Cardo and Task Force Agila reconsider themselves to be prepared for the next fight.
| 1580 | 136 | "Pagkakataon" | February 28, 2022 | 10.4% |
Oscar begins his spark in San Andres by growing his livelihood program for the upcoming tourists in the North. Armando and Lolita discovers the reopening of Don Ignacio's art exhibit to invite the First Lady and the President.
| 1581 | 137 | "Magtago" | March 1, 2022 | 10.9% |
Given the rumoring low-moraled officers of the Black Ops, Albert was convinced by his team to be reinstated after suspension. Mara head to the church for prayers while Aurora hides in the confession booth.
| 1582 | 138 | "Iligtas" | March 2, 2022 | 11.0% |
Mara recalls how she saved Aurora from the goons at the church. Lily receives a request from Albert to help be reinstated back from the police force.
| 1583 | 139 | "Tauhan" | March 3, 2022 | 10.6% |
Lily informs Lito that Albert voluntarily requests her to cater his reinstation back from the police force after being suspended in the work. Oscar went back to the rendezvous place of his past with Aurora.
| 1584 | 140 | "Peligro" | March 4, 2022 | 10.7% |
Aurora recalls how she was successfully escape from Eduardo's goons, unaware of brother's motive, she brings with Mara her same place with Oscar.
| 1585 | 141 | "Tagpuan" | March 7, 2022 | 11.1% |
Aurora and Mara went to the same place as she almost a catch glimpse of Oscar upon seeing same flowers gave him.
| 1586 | 142 | "Hidwaan" | March 8, 2022 | 12.0% |
Aurora gives Mara a love life somehow, Albert informs his team to return to headquarter. After disappointed Lito receives an intense call from Albert.
| 1587 | 143 | "Reinstatement" | March 9, 2022 | 11.6% |
Albert returns to the headquarters, as he vows to capture Cardo and Task Force Agila. After information about the Black Ops, Lito prepares his plan with Albert and his henchmen.
| 1588 | 144 | "Pataasan" | March 10, 2022 | 11.2% |
Cassandra visits Ellen to ask for a help against Mariano's lockdown. Lito chases after Albert to settle their thoughts from bragging themselves down on earth.
| 1589 | 145 | "Ama" | March 11, 2022 | 10.4% |
Mara is surprised to learn that Aurora's father is Don Ignacio, Albert informs Lily to what Lito did. Ellen and Cassandra prepares sets trap against the fake president.
| 1590 | 146 | "Muhi" | March 14, 2022 | 11.0% |
After she is shocking about Aurora's identity Mara recalls how she saved Aurora's life and kindness, despite saving her life, Lito vows to get rid of Cardo and Oscar.
| 1591 | 147 | "Amo" | March 15, 2022 | 11.5% |
After she left with Aurora, Mara vows to finish off the businessman. Lily, Albert, and Lito sets their trap against Cardo and the Task Force Agila. Unaware that Cardo and his comrades are preparing them and capture him and the fake president.
| 1592 | 148 | "Pagkaisahan" | March 16, 2022 | 10.8% |
Don Ignacio asks Aurora to attend the upcoming art exhibit. Wanting to leave the hell they are in, Ellen and Cassandra collaborate in their plan against Mariano. Albert and his team will be successfully to capture the infamous cop, Unaware of Cardo's plan against his enemies.
| 1593 | 149 | "Halughugin" | March 17, 2022 | 10.5% |
Ellen and Cassandra collaborated to successfully escape from Mariano's eager. Cardo and the Task Force Agila prepares themselves in the art exhibit to capturing Oscar and Lily, Unaware that the president is fake impostor.
| 1594 | 150 | "Bantay" | March 18, 2022 | N/A |
Albert and Lito is confident that will successfully plan against the infamous cop. Unaware that Cardo and the Task Force Agila are preparing to capture Mariano and Lily once in for all.
| 1595 | 151 | "Kasado" | March 21, 2022 | 11.2% |
Omar continues to sneak around Armando's room as he fails then beaten up by Samuel and Lucas. The Task Force Agila becomes more suspicious around Northern plaza upon learning the police security absence in the art exhibit.
| 1596 | 152 | "Doble Ingat" | March 22, 2022 | 10.5% |
The Task Force Agila was caught suspiciously by one of the surveillance that patrols from Black Ops command.
| 1597 | 153 | "Kahina-hinala" | March 23, 2022 | 10.4% |
Cardo and the Task Force Agila gets an expected roaming around the city. As Armando, Lolita, and Mara pretends to a parent and daughters not to caught off with the Black Ops.
| 1598 | 154 | "Kutob" | March 24, 2022 | 10.3% |
Lily assures her success in presidential race through Don Ignacio's accepted favor. Armando is left with no choice to relay his secret mission to Samuel that is after against Cardo and his fold.
| 1599 | 155 | "Nakataya" | March 25, 2022 | 10.4% |
The Task Force Agila worries for their big journey ahead against Don Ignacio by the art exhibit in the North. Lito and Albert were waiting for Lily's arrival for a big reason.
| 1600 | 156 | "Kaba" | March 28, 2022 | 10.4% |
Lito becomes the next Executive Secretary if Lily wins the presidential race while Albert is disappointment of Lito's higher role above them. Elsewhere, Mariano insists to depart in the North to assure finding Ellen and Cassandra before the dawn.
| 1601 | 157 | "Armado" | March 29, 2022 | 10.1% |
Renato grows curious as he fails to comprehend why Don Ignacio invited Lily to the art exhibit. The Black Ops and Lito's group take up arms as they head out to ensnare Cardo and Task Force Agila during the high-profile event.
| 1602 | 158 | "Landas" | March 30, 2022 | 10.5% |
Oscar hopes to cross paths with Cardo as he heads out to buy supplies in the town center. Ellen and Cassandra remain adamant in escaping from Mariano's clutches. Aurora resolves to face the President at the exhibit to find closure.
| 1603 | 159 | "Namataan" | March 31, 2022 | 10.8% |
Now collaborating, Albert and Lito deploy their men around the venue of the art exhibit. Seeking vengeance, Omar sneaks to foil Cardo's plans. Oscar, while looking for supplies, catches sight of the man who destroyed his life in the past.
| 1604 | 160 | "Posisyon" | April 1, 2022 | 11.2% |
Task Force Agila and Armando's men set out to enact their plans against their nemeses. Unknown to them, Lito and Albert heighten their search upon confirming the notorious group's whereabouts.
| 1605 | 161 | "Obra" | April 4, 2022 | 11.5% |
While Armando and Cardo await the right time to enact their plans, Albert and Lito mobilize their men to seize the members of Task Force Agila. Omar falls into the hands of Black Ops in his attempt to exact revenge.
| 1606 | 162 | "Tensyonado" | April 5, 2022 | 11.0% |
Omar reveals Cardo's plans to Albert and Lito. Tension slowly rises as Task Force Agila and Armando's fold await Oscar's arrival. Lily hides behind an unctuous façade as she tries to provoke Aurora.
| 1607 | 163 | "Luhod" | April 6, 2022 | 11.7% |
With the fake president's arrival, Lily gloats over Cardo's impending doom. Aurora is left in disbelief and debilitating heartache upon confirming Lily's claim that Oscar has completely moved on from their shared past.
| 1608 | 164 | "Kahihiyan" | April 7, 2022 | 11.1% |
Preparing for a full-scale war, Task Force Agila and Armando's fold begin setting traps outside the art exhibit. Just after finally receiving Don Ignacio's sweet endorsement, Lily watches helplessly as a livid Mariano creates another scandal.
| 1609 | 165 | "Countdown" | April 8, 2022 | 12.2% |
Chaos erupts amid the art exhibit as Cardo and the Task Force Agila turn up to stop Mariano's atrocity in the nick of time. While Armando's fold goes after Don Ignacio, Lito and Albert find an opportunity to seize the notorious group.
| 1610 | 166 | "Open Fire" | April 11, 2022 | 12.2% |
The heated clash between Task Force Agila and Black Ops intensifies when Lito opens fire on Cardo. Meanwhile, Don Ignacio comes face to face with his greatest adversary.
| 1611 | 167 | "Sisihan" | April 12, 2022 | 12.2% |
Cardo and Task Force Agila dodge bullets while trying to shake off the Black Ops and Lito's men. Hell-bent on revenge, Lolita refuses to listen to Aurora's pleas as she continues to blame the Guillermo heiress for the death of her daughter.
| 1612 | 168 | "Magsabayan" | April 13, 2022 | 11.1% |
While trying to find a way out of danger, Cardo and Task Force Agila are left with no choice but to engage in battle. Public opinion begins to go against the incumbent president as footage of Cassandra's shooting circulates online.
| 1613 | 169 | "Perimeter" | April 18, 2022 | 11.6% |
Task Force Agila tries to escape the ravaging battle against Black Ops and Lito's fold with all its strength. Oscar laments his missed opportunity to reconcile with Cardo, while Aurora grows remorseful toward the people of San Andres.
| 1614 | 170 | "Mag-Isa" | April 19, 2022 | 11.9% |
Armando's fold mounts a retreat without Mara in a bid to save their leader's life. While fleeing from the battle zone, one of Task Force Agila's foundations is left behind and falls into Lito's hands.
| 1615 | 171 | "Huling Oras" | April 20, 2022 | 12.2% |
After saving Ramil from certain death, the Task Force Agila manages to turn the tide against their enemies. As the lives of his friends hang in the balance, the fugitive policeman sees red and unleashes all his wrath on Mariano.
| 1616 | 172 | "Sumbat" | April 21, 2022 | 12.1% |
With Mariano now under the Task Force Agila's mercy, Renato hatches a plan to snatch the seat of power from Lily. Threatened by Cassandra's revelation, the First Lady takes a drastic step to ensure that her secret remains hidden. Unbeknownst to her, Ellen had already revealed the secret to Cardo and his group.
| 1617 | 173 | "Pinagmulan" | April 22, 2022 | 12.2% (2nd) |
Still believing that Mariano is the real president, the Task Force Agila puts forward their demands from him. The truth behind Mara's situation comes to light as Lolita's anger toward the Guillermos intensifies.
| 1618 | 174 | "Takas" | April 25, 2022 | 10.9% |
While Don Ignacio vows to kill Cardo and the people of San Andres in cold blood, Aurora wonders why the infamous vigilante and Lolita's group are working against Oscar. With no plans of revealing his true identity, Mariano attempts to escape.
| 1619 | 175 | "Hanap" | April 26, 2022 | 11.2% |
Mariano and Ellen sneakily hide from their captors as they try to escape from the labyrinthine hideout they are in. While Cardo and his allies are busy recapturing their captives, Omar considers taking the life of Task Force Agila's injured members.
| 1620 | 176 | "Bala" | April 27, 2022 | 10.0% |
Following a tense search, Cardo manages to spot and pounce on the fleeing president. Running out of luck, Ellen falls into the hands of Lolita's group and finds herself looking down the barrel of a gun.
| 1621 | 177 | "Kapakanan" | April 28, 2022 | 10.7% |
Renato brims with satisfaction as Mariano's actions level the playing field between him and Lily. While convincing Aurora that everything he is doing is for her safety, Don Ignacio learns about the motivation of his enemies.
| 1622 | 178 | "Pasabog" | April 29, 2022 | 10.4% |
Renato pushes for his own agenda to steal the reins of power from Lily, only to be outwitted by his archnemesis' vile ploy. Task Force Agila makes plans to expose the President's atrocities to the public.
| 1623 | 179 | "Bagsik" | May 2, 2022 | 10.1% |
A recent photo of Oscar makes rounds as Senate President Edades officially takes over the presidency for the time being. A raging Armando rushes to confront the abducted president over his family's tragic past.
| 1624 | 180 | "Pagamin" | May 3, 2022 | 10.4% |
Camilo expresses his doubts when Lily introduces Lito to him as his new executive secretary. Armando pours out his deep-seated resentments toward Oscar, unaware that the person receiving his wrath is an impostor.
| 1625 | 181 | "Pagkatao" | May 4, 2022 | 9.6% |
Fearing for his life, Mariano reveals how Lily, Renato, and Art used him to replace Oscar for their nefarious goals. Armed with the truth, Cardo comes up with a way to use the fake president to their advantage.
| 1626 | 182 | "Kamukha" | May 5, 2022 | 9.8% |
Cardo hatches a plan for Task Force Agila's face-off with Lily and Renato, unaware of Armando's decision against fighting with them. Seeing Mara's helpless state, Armando cannot help but feel sorry for his adopted daughter.
| 1627 | 183 | "Isiwalat" | May 6, 2022 | 9.6% |
Armando lashes out at Lolita for instructing their men to beat Mara harshly. After deciding to begin the search for Oscar, Task Force Agila exposes the fake president to the public to force Lily and Renato into heeding their demands.
| 1628 | 184 | "Video" | May 10, 2022 | 11.2% |
Upon receiving the video of Mariano's confession, Renato rushes to confront Lily and blame her for the mess they are in. Determined to find answers about Lolita, Aurora sets foot in San Andres again.
| 1629 | 185 | "Kilos" | May 11, 2022 | 9.6% |
Aurora catches a glimpse of Oscar in San Andres. Lily and Renato decide to use everything in their power as they race to track down Cardo and retrieve Mariano. Concerned for his dear friend, Lucas asks Task Force Agila's help in finding Mara.
| 1630 | 186 | "Suporta" | May 12, 2022 | 9.9% |
Aware that they are walking into the lion's den, Cardo orders Task Force Agila to conduct their mission to find Mara as stealthily as possible. Renato and Art expose Lily's lies in a bid to secure Don Ignacio's support.
| 1631 | 187 | "Magkasalubong" | May 13, 2022 | 9.7% |
While Aurora tries to contact her friend, Lucas blames Lolita and Armando for Mara's disappearance. Armando brews a plan against the notorious group to win the large bounty on their heads. Art and Renato unknowingly cross paths with Cardo.
| 1632 | 188 | "Matyag" | May 16, 2022 | 10.8% |
Samuel grows suspicious as Armando and Lolita remain unbothered by Mara's long absence. While the rest of Task Force Agila stays outside Don Ignacio's hideout, Cardo and Lucas sneak in to find clues about Mara's whereabouts.
| 1633 | 189 | "Pribilehiyo" | May 17, 2022 | 10.5% |
Lucas and Task Force Agila's search comes to naught when they fail to find Mara in Don Ignacio's hideout. As Mariano mocks the group's commitment to their noble cause, Delfin insists to him that truth and justice prevail in the end.
| 1634 | 190 | "Atras" | May 18, 2022 | 10.2% |
Armando sets his sights on finding Oscar upon learning of the real president's appearance at Don Ignacio's art exhibit. As the Task Force Agila returns with Lucas, Armando greets them with bad news.
| 1635 | 191 | "Mulat" | May 19, 2022 | 10.1% |
Lily expresses confidence that Don Ignacio will continue backing her up, unaware of what Renato and Art did to sabotage her. Lucas loses all the respect he has for Armando as he begins to question the motives of the man he looks up to.
| 1636 | 192 | "Alinlangan" | May 20, 2022 | 9.5% |
Oscar finds himself between a rock and a hard place after learning of Camilo's assumption to office as acting president. A realization dawns upon Aurora while she ponders upon Lily's piercing remarks about her relationship with Oscar in the past.
| 1637 | 193 | "Muling Pagkikita" | May 23, 2022 | 11.1% |
Aurora sneaks out of the Guillermo mansion in hopes of meeting her beloved in San Andres. Oscar, on the other hand, decides to find Cardo and bids his friends farewell. Lily, Renato, and Art meet with their allies for their next course of action.
| 1638 | 194 | "Paliwanag" | May 24, 2022 | 10.1% |
After sharing the struggles they faced following the massacre in San Andres, Aurora vows to find Maria Isabel while Oscar grows more resolute to find Cardo and Task Force Agila. Topping a survey, Lily remains confident that she will win in the end.
| 1639 | 195 | "Paghahanda" | May 25, 2022 | 10.9% |
Not wanting to take any chances, Lily, Renato, and Art gear themselves up for their upcoming face-off with Cardo. Meanwhile, Armando and Lolita are caught completely by surprise as the Task Force Agila heads for their one big fight.
| 1640 | 196 | "Pagbunyag" | May 26, 2022 | 9.9% |
Heading to the airstrip, Cardo plans to use the media as a protection against their enemies. Despite learning Mara's true identity and Armando's endgame, Lucas fails to rein in his emotions upon seeing his dear friend's condition.
| 1641 | 197 | "Abang" | May 27, 2022 | 9.7% |
Lolita and Armando decide to dispose Mara for good, fueling Lucas' desire to avenge his dear friend. While the Black Ops move to their positions, Lito sets his sights on exacting his revenge against Cardo once and for all.
| 1642 | 198 | "Padating" | May 30, 2022 | 11.0% |
Lily and Renato position their men around the landing field ahead of their meeting with Task Force Agila, only to be surprised by the press' sudden arrival. Cardo comes up with a way to prevent Mariano from selling him and his team down the river.
| 1643 | 199 | "Pinanghahawakan" | May 31, 2022 | 11.2% |
Lily struggles to hide behind an unfazed facade as Renato reveals how he used the truth to ruin her plans. Surrounded by his enemies, Cardo prays for the country's welfare as he and Mariano slowly approach the airstrip.
| 1644 | 200 | "Paghaharap" | June 1, 2022 | 11.3% |
Armando begins concocting his next move as he awaits Task Force Agila's return. Cardo watches as the truth comes out while Lily, Renato, and Art drag each other in front of the press, unaware of the dangerous trap he stepped into.
| 1645 | 201 | "Inasinta" | June 2, 2022 | 10.6% |
All hell breaks loose after Lito seized a window of opportunity to settle an old score with Cardo, leaving the Task Force Agila to scramble to safety. Mariano experiences Lily's wrath as Renato and Art manage to slip through her fingers.
| 1646 | 202 | "Dagok" | June 3, 2022 | 11.1% |
Despite escaping the pandemonium unscathed, the Task Force Agila feels devastated for leaving Cardo behind. To ensure that everything goes her way, Lily tasks Albert to escort the wanted ex-cop to the hospital.
| 1647 | 203 | "Lusob" | June 6, 2022 | 12.1% |
Armando and Lolita make veiled threats as they explain to their men why they decided to get rid of Mara. Unaware of the danger heading their way, Oscar and Aurora resolve to leave no stone unturned in their search for Maria Isabel.
| 1648 | 204 | "Malubha" | June 7, 2022 | 11.2% |
After saving Oscar from certain death, Aurora and the residents of San Andres flee from Don Ignacio's wrath. While Cardo continues fighting for his life, some members of Task Force Agila fall into deep misery and hopelessness.
| 1649 | 205 | "Bantayan" | June 8, 2022 | 10.2% |
Lily sheds crocodile tears as she tries to use the airstrip incident to her advantage, only to be hounded by the press' piercing questions. Albert implements tight measures in the hospital in a bid to prevent Cardo from slipping through his fingers.
| 1650 | 206 | "Balita" | June 9, 2022 | 10.2% |
Albert heightens the hospital's security as Cardo remains unconscious. Lito resorts to threats in a bid to ensure that Camilo will blindly follow Lily's orders. Task Force Agila sees a much-needed silver lining upon hearing a positive news.
| 1651 | 207 | "Sumbong" | June 10, 2022 | 10.6% |
With Don Ignacio's support, Renato and Art cook up a wicked plan in a bid to fortify their reign of terror. Upon rejecting Task Force Agila's earnest plea, Armando wastes no time in taking advantage of the price on the wanted group's head.
| 1652 | 208 | "Puslit" | June 13, 2022 | 10.9% |
Task Force Agila makes a break for safety upon learning of Armando's plan to sell them out. Refusing to let a perfect chance slip away, Lito decides to go against Lily's orders as he launches an attack to end Cardo's life.
| 1653 | 209 | "Pinatakas" | June 14, 2022 | 11.2% |
While Lucas and Task Force Agila widen the gap between them and Armando's men, Omar grabs the chance to exact his revenge. A shootout ensues at the hospital as Albert tries to prevent Lito from killing Cardo.
| 1654 | 210 | "Harapan" | June 15, 2022 | 11.8% |
Surprised to find another person in Cardo's bed, Lito goes on the hunt as he follows the trail of blood left by his target. While still hiding in the woods with Aurora, Oscar sees a ray of hope upon spotting the fleeing Task Force Agila.
| 1655 | 211 | "Habulan" | June 16, 2022 | 12.3% |
In spite of his injuries, Cardo finds the strength to fight Lito after reliving the pain of losing Alyana. Soon, he finds himself plodding through a battlefield as he evades danger. Armando reveals to Delfin his dark means to reach his goals.
| 1656 | 212 | "Ganti" | June 17, 2022 | 12.2% |
Lito's followers bear the brunt of Albert's wrath. Cardo engages in a life-and-death battle with Lito to finally avenge Alyana's tragic fate, attracting the attention of nearby farmers. Oscar and the Task Force Agila arrive at their new hideout.
| 1657 | 213 | "Tulungan" | June 20, 2022 | 12.1% |
In a bid to bring Cardo to safety, a group of armed farmers makes use of a dense forest to shake off the pursuing Black Ops. Lily arrives at Armando's turf to come face to face with Delfin. Oscar and Aurora receive a heartbreaking news.
| 1658 | 214 | "Pananabik" | June 21, 2022 | 12.3% |
Ramona explains why she decided to save Cardo as she rallies her comrades to keep fighting for their cause. After forging an alliance with Armando, Lily receives a shocking news. Words fail Aurora upon finally seeing Maria Isabel's face.
| 1659 | 215 | "Pagaalangan" | June 22, 2022 | 11.6% |
Lily uses her resources to track down Don Ignacio. Oscar and Aurora vow to do everything to bring Armando and Lolita to justice. Some members of Task Force Agila lose faith as their fire starts to dim in the face of their insurmountable foes.
| 1660 | 216 | "Pagkikita" | June 23, 2022 | 12.2% |
Waking up in an unfamiliar place, Cardo instinctively draws his gun and covers his presence for any encounter. However, a deluge of memories soon sweeps him and reminds him of the spark that started the flame in his heart upon seeing Ramona up close.
| 1661 | 217 | "Higanti" | June 24, 2022 | 12.2% |
As Ramona insists on protecting him at all costs, Cardo encourages the armed group to continue their quest for peace and justice. Don Ignacio refuses to give up without a fight when Armando's fold makes a surprise attack.
| 1662 | 218 | "Panalangin" | June 27, 2022 | 11.8% |
Armando's fold makes Don Ignacio feel the intensity of their burning wrath. While Ramona's camp is being besieged by enemy forces, Cardo prays for strength and faster recovery as he resolves to continue fighting for the country.
| 1663 | 219 | "Alyansa" | June 28, 2022 | 12.3% |
Now that Don Ignacio is gone, Armando sets his sights on hunting down Aurora and Eduardo. Needing a force to counter Lily, Renato tries convincing the remaining leaders and members of Pulang Araw to join his side.
| 1664 | 220 | "Pinaglalaban" | June 29, 2022 | 11.2% |
Fed up with the countless death of her comrades, Ramona vows not to let her allies' sacrifices go to waste. Losing all hope, some members of Task Force Agila drop their weapons and desert their wearying fight against their powerful enemies.
| 1665 | 221 | "Pagtatanggol" | June 30, 2022 | 10.8% |
Armed and ready, Albert and his troops tread a dense and dangerous forest as they inch closer to their target's location. The departing members of Task Force Agila start reconsidering their decisions when Cardo's escape hits the headlines.
| 1666 | 222 | "Bakbakan" | July 1, 2022 | 11.6% |
With Ramona fighting by his side, Cardo exchanges fire with Black Ops as the elite group manages to infiltrate their camp. Lucas pledges to join Task Force Agila in their plan to return to Armando's hideout to save Cardo.
| 1667 | 223 | "Misyon" | July 4, 2022 | 11.6% (4th) |
Amid a hail of bullets, Ramona and her comrades put their lives on the line as they defend their ground against the Black Ops' all-out attack. As the government forces retreat, Cardo sets out to accomplish his mission.
| 1668 | 224 | "Pagsuporta" | July 5, 2022 | 12.0% (4th) |
Seeking justice for Maria Isabel, Aurora joins Task Force Agila's return to Armando's hideout. Lily resorts to dirty tricks to secure the country's highest seat of power. Renato amasses all the support he needs in his bid to topple down his enemies.
| 1669 | 225 | "Nahuli" | July 6, 2022 | 11.8% (4th) |
Upon the arrival of his high-grade firearms, Renato rallies his troops as he sets out to overthrow and replace the government. Encumbered by his wounds, Delfin is caught during his attempt to warn Cardo of Armando's betrayal.
| 1670 | 226 | "Panlilinlang" | July 7, 2022 | 12.9% (4th) |
Armando and Lolita feign concern when Cardo finally makes his highly-anticipated return to their lair. As the group continues to deceive his grandson, Delfin remains determined to save the Task Force Agila leader from his downfall.
| 1671 | 227 | "Sakripisyo" | July 8, 2022 | 13.1% (4th) |
Oscar and the Task Force Agila keep a sharp lookout as they slowly approach Armando's lair. All hell breaks loose when Delfin makes a last-ditch effort to protect Cardo from the assassin's evil ploy.
| 1672 | 228 | "Ipaglaban" | July 11, 2022 | 13.2% (4th) |
Desperate to tip the odds in his grandson's favor, Delfin sacrifices himself to give Cardo a fighting chance. Hearing the gunfire, Task Force Agila proceeds with caution as they invade Armando's hideout.
| 1673 | 229 | "Pagtutuos" | July 12, 2022 | 13.9% (3rd) |
Oscar and Aurora put their lives in danger as they come face-to-face with the people who used and killed Maria Isabel. Cardo takes advantage of his surroundings to battle against Samuel and his goons.
| 1674 | 230 | "Dalamhati" | July 13, 2022 | 13.1% (4th) |
As the light flickers out of her eyes, Aurora urges Oscar to continue fighting for the country and keep seeking justice for Mara. Armando asks Lily for support as he and his men mount a retreat. Cardo breaks down in tears upon seeing Delfin's state.
| 1675 | 231 | "Paggunita" | July 14, 2022 | 13.0% (3rd) |
Lily and Art reach out to their allies to ensure that their respective plans succeed. While Diana and Roxanne try to save Aurora, Task Force Agila feels despair as they mourn Delfin's tragic fate.
| 1676 | 232 | "Pamamaalam" | July 15, 2022 | 11.1% (4th) |
Task Force Agila refuses to abandon Cardo and vows to join in his fight to go after Armando and Lolita. Seeing how Delfin's death greatly affects Cardo, Diana and Oscar remind him of their noble cause.
| 1677 | 233 | "Paghimok" | July 18, 2022 | 11.9% (4th) |
Using their power and influence, Lily and Renato bolster their respective forces to secure victory. Mourning Delfin's death, the members of Task Force Agila find strength in each other's arms as they continue fighting for the country.
| 1678 | 234 | "Dadamayan" | July 19, 2022 | 11.8% (4th) |
Renato attempts to form an alliance with a notorious terrorist. Oscar figures out a way to reclaim the palace. Drowning in rage and misery, Cardo considers giving up on his principles as he decides to put matters into his own hands.
| 1679 | 235 | "Pagbangon" | July 20, 2022 | 12.3% (4th) |
Oscar encourages Cardo and Task Force Agila to go arm in arm and continue fighting for the country. Camilo resolves to return to the palace as he finds ways to save his family from Lily, only to be dumbfounded by the arrival of some unwelcome guests.
| 1680 | 236 | "Kasunduan" | July 21, 2022 | 11.9% (4th) |
As Lucio instills fears through a series of bombings, Renato and his allies gear up for their do-or-die battle with Cardo. Camilo, meanwhile, receives a dreadful news upon refusing to follow Oscar and Task Force Agila's demand.
| 1681 | 237 | "Pagsisiwalat" | July 22, 2022 | 12.3% (4th) |
Oscar decides to put an end to Lily's reign as he goes on a live broadcast to bring her true colors to light. Renato and Art, on the other hand, are thrown into a panic and think of escaping for the time being.
| 1682 | 238 | "Pagbabalik" | July 25, 2022 | 12.9% (4th) |
Adamant in making Lily pay for her crimes, Oscar appears before the police's and the military's top brass to reestablish command and kick the first lady out of the palace. Amid the chaos, Renato grows more desperate to win Lucio's support.
| 1683 | 239 | "Anunsyo" | July 26, 2022 | 12.9% (3rd) |
Cardo and Task Force Agila grow uneasy as they receive no news on Oscar's mission to reclaim the palace. After waiting for hours, the battle-tested servicemen regain hope upon seeing the president making a powerful announcement in front of the media.
| 1684 | 240 | "Plano" | July 27, 2022 | 13.2% (3rd) |
With checkpoints popping up along the borders, Lily races against time as she heads to Tierra Del Diablo. Renato secures a meeting with Lucio. The members of Task Force Agila rein in their excitement as their status as servicemen remains unclear.
| 1685 | 241 | "Alyansa" | July 28, 2022 | 12.7% (3rd) |
Renato tries to bribe Lucio into forging an alliance with him. Lily girds her loins in anticipation of Oscar's strike. Cardo and the Task Force Agila are taken aback when a group of armed cops arrives at their safe house.
| 1686 | 242 | "Reinstatement" | July 29, 2022 | 13.2% (3rd) |
Cardo and the Task Force Agila's fight for justice succeeds as they are reinstated. Arturo's attempt to negotiate with Lucio makes the terrorist's blood boil, leaving Renato with no choice but to make an unexpected decision.
| 1687 | 243 | "Pagpupulong" | August 1, 2022 | 12.9% (3rd) |
Lily checks her turf as she anticipates an attack from Cardo and Oscar. Arriving at Lucio's camp, Renato tells Eduardo that he only sees the terrorist as a means to his goals. Task Force Agila deliberates their next move against the first lady.
| 1688 | 244 | "Pagsugod" | August 2, 2022 | 12.3% (3rd) |
Renato comes up with a way to divide and conquer his enemies. Lily meets with her allies to bolster her chances of beating Cardo and Oscar. Despite having additional men, Task Force Agila refuses to be complacent as they head to Tierra Del Diablo.
| 1689 | 245 | "Pagsalakay" | August 3, 2022 | 13.2% (3rd) |
Lily is left with no choice but to move to a safer place when Cardo, Oscar, and Task Force Agila begin raiding Tierra Del Diablo. Amid the government forces' offensive, the first lady turns against her allies as panic reveals their true colors.
| 1690 | 246 | "Pagtugis" | August 4, 2022 | 12.7% (3rd) |
Driven into a corner, Lily races against time to escape from her approaching enemies. The renegade Black Ops, on the other hand, find themselves at a great disadvantage as Task Force Agila continues to hold the defensive line.
| 1691 | 247 | "Paniningil" | August 5, 2022 | 14.5% (3rd) |
Armando gains the upper hand in the cat-and-mouse game with Task Force Agila until he comes across Cardo. Tension runs high as Lily attempts to turn the tide against Oscar following her capture.
| 1692 | 248 | "Samahan" | August 8, 2022 | 12.9% (3rd) |
With Lucio's help, Renato sets off his vile scheme that aims to instill fear and terror in the hearts of anyone who dares to oppose him. The members of Task Force Agila become emotional when Cardo announces his plans after their next mission.
| 1693 | 249 | "Operation Dagit" | August 9, 2022 | 12.7% (3rd) |
Learning that Renato has teamed up with Lucio's terrorist group, Cardo, Oscar, and Task Force Agila prepare for their mission to quell the remaining threat to the country's peace and freedom.
| 1694 | 250 | "Huling Misyon" | August 10, 2022 | 14.3% (3rd) |
Confident that their traps will be enough to beat the government forces, Renato and Lucio let Task Force Agila enter their territory. Victor's team faces danger as their enemies cut their communication with their allies.
| 1695 | 251 | "Huling Lipad" | August 11, 2022 | 14.1% (3rd) |
The Task Force Agila members on standby are caught by surprise as they begin infiltrating their enemies' stronghold. Overwhelmed by Cardo's unwavering resolve, Renato executes a vile trick up his sleeve.
| 1696 | 252 | "Mission Accomplished" | August 12, 2022 | 16.6% (1st) |
Worming their way into the terrorists' lair, Task Force Agila continues to take a hit as their intense skirmish against Renato reaches a fever pitch. Determined to protect Oscar at all costs, Cardo faces his enemies head-on.

Legend
| Peak Season Rating |
| Lowest Season Rating |
