= Ang Probinsyano season 7 =

Season of television series

Ang Probinsyano
- Season 7
- Second version of Season 7's title card commemorating its 4th Anniversary.
- Starring: Coco Martin
- No. of episodes: 253

Release
- Original network: ABS-CBN (April 8, 2019 – March 13, 2020); Kapamilya Channel, Cine Mo! (June 15–26, 2020)
- Original release: April 8, 2019 – June 26, 2020

Season chronology
- ← Previous; Season 6 Next → Season 8

The seventh season of Ang Probinsyano, a Philippine action drama television series, premiered on ABS-CBN's Primetime Bida evening block and worldwide on The Filipino Channel. Production of the season began following the departure of several cast members who left the program to run in the 2019 midterm elections, along with the introduction of new characters. The season aired from April 8, 2019, to June 26, 2020, with a total of 253 episodes. The series stars Coco Martin as Ricardo Dalisay, alongside an ensemble cast.

The narrative of the seventh season focuses on the restoration of Oscar Hidalgo to the presidency, as well as his and Vendetta's continuing efforts to eliminate crime and corruption in the Philippines.

On March 16, 2020, the broadcast of the series was suspended due to the implementation of the enhanced community quarantine in response to the COVID-19 pandemic in the Philippines. During its suspension, its timeslot was filled with reruns of May Bukas Pa.

Following ABS-CBN's franchise shutdown and the subsequent cease and desist order issued by the National Telecommunications Commission, there was uncertainty regarding the program's continuation. Nevertheless, Ang Probinsyano resumed airing on June 15, 2020, under the tagline "Tuloy ang Laban," beginning with a ten-episode recap, after which new episodes were broadcast. On the same day, its production resumed.

== Plot ==
After the downfall of President Cabrera (Edu Manzano), Oscar Hidalgo (Rowell Santiago) was restored as the rightful President of the Philippines with the help of Vendetta, led by Ricardo "Cardo" Dalisay (Coco Martin). Committed to reform, Hidalgo granted amnesty to Vendetta and absorbed them into Task Force Agila, a new government unit against crime. While this secured temporary stability, it also enabled Lily Ann Cortez (Lorna Tolentino) to gain influence. Presenting herself as a philanthropist, Lily covertly expanded her criminal networks and exploited her ties to the president. At the same time, Cabrera's former ally Renato Hipolito (John Arcilla), supported by crime boss Lazaro (Gardo Versoza), returned to the underworld and sought dominance through intimidation and murder, creating instability that Lily maneuvered to her advantage.

Task Force Agila became the government's spearhead against organized crime, targeting drug syndicates, rogue policemen, and kidnappers. Their operations, however, drew retaliation from powerful enemies. Among the most dangerous was Dante "Bungo" Madarang (Baron Geisler), a sadistic crime lord who sought revenge against Cardo. His atrocities included massacres, abductions, and the murders of female officers, pushing the task force into exhausting battles. Despite victories in dismantling syndicates and saving hostages, they suffered heavy casualties and constant harassment from corrupt politicians such as Gina Magtanggol (Mitch Valdes) and Bartolome "Kap Bart" C. Bulaan (Leo Martinez), who repeatedly targeted Cardo's family and business.

Cardo and his allies eventually confronted Dante in a series of brutal encounters. Following the murder of Alex (Denise Laurel) and several deadly ambushes, Dante entrenched himself in Sitio Kasagaran, recruiting locals to resist government forces. In the final showdown, he fought Cardo across the community until they clashed in a basketball court. Weakened but defiant, Dante revealed explosives strapped to his body. Although Cardo shot him, he detonated the bombs, killing himself and ending his reign of terror. This marked a turning point for Task Force Agila but did not ease the growing threats posed by Lily, Hipolito, and Lazaro.

Meanwhile, Lily tightened her hold over the presidency by feigning illnesses, aligning with foreign drug syndicates, and abandoning former allies. Her schemes coincided with upheavals in the barangay, where Lola Flora (Susan Roces) was disqualified from the captaincy, leading Alyana Dalisay (Yassi Pressman) to run and win against Bart and Gina's corrupt campaign. The victory was marred by violence when Bart's gunmen attacked their celebration, leaving Alyana critically wounded before Bart and Gina were arrested and disgraced. Simultaneously, Chloe, a witness to Hipolito's operations, aided Task Force Agila in exposing criminal warehouses but was later murdered by Renato after refusing full cooperation. Rivalries deepened as Lily secured greater control, even marrying President Hidalgo while secretly eliminating competitors.

Despite successes, Task Force Agila faced mounting pressure as corruption infiltrated both the barangay and Malacañang. Alyana began her term as captain while dealing with remnants of Bart's influence, and Judge Arturo Padua's (Tirso Cruz III) family brought further discord through smuggling and abuse of power. Clarice Padua's (Rhen Escaño) obsession with Cardo strained his marriage, while Oscar's judgment was compromised by Lily and Renato's manipulation. Violence escalated further with new syndicates and kidnappings, leading to the deaths of Task Force members and the adoption of an orphaned child by Cardo and Alyana. Even as Delfin Borja (Jaime Fabregas) was framed and suspended, Cardo pressed on, uncovering Lily and Renato's plots.

== Cast and characters ==
Main cast

- Coco Martin as P/Cpt. Ricardo "Cardo" Dalisay
- Yassi Pressman as Kapitana Alyana R. Arevalo-Dalisay
- Angel Aquino as Diana T. Olegario
- John Arcilla as Renato "Buwitre" Hipolito
- Rowell Santiago as President Oscar Hidalgo
- Shamaine Centenera-Buencamino as Virginia "Virgie" R. Arevalo
- John Prats as PC/MSgt. Jerome Girona Jr.
- Bianca Manalo as Lourdes "Bubbles" Torres
- McCoy de Leon as Juan Pablo "JP" R. Arevalo
- Jaime Fabregas as Delfin S. Borja
- Michael de Mesa as Pat. Ramil "Manager" Taduran
- Joel Torre as Teodoro "Teddy" Arevalo/Jose Malaya (Note: Teddy Arevalo used the pen name Jose Malaya in his exposés against Lily and her allies.)
- Lorna Tolentino as First Lady Lily Ann Cortez-Hidalgo
- Susan Roces as Flora "Lola Kap" S. Borja-de Leon

Supporting cast

- Mitch Valdes as Konsehala Gina Magtanggol (Note: Gina Magtanggol was written off the show as a sitting Manila City Councilor awaiting trial as principal for the complex crime of unintentional abortion with double frustrated murder, hence she is still listed under her title as City Councilor.)
- Malou Crisologo as Yolanda "Yolly" Capuyao-Santos
- Marvin Yap as Elmo Santos
- PJ Endrinal as Wally Nieves
- Lester Llansang as P/Cpt. Mark Vargas
- Michael Roy Jornales as P/Cpt. Francisco "Chikoy" Rivera
- John Medina as P/Cpt. Avel "Billy" M. Guzman
- Marc Solis as P/MSgt. Rigor Soriano
- CJ Ramos as Pat. Patrick Espinosa
- Daria Ramirez as Auring
- Arlene Muhlach as Loring
- Ella Cruz as Lisa
- Jobert "Kuya Jobert" Austria as Pat. George "Wangbu" Espinosa
- Bryan "Smugglaz" Lao as Pat. Marsial "Butete" Matero
- Lordivino "Bassilyo" Ignacio as Pat. Dante "Bulate" Villafuerte
- Hyubs Azarcon as P/MSgt. Rolando "Lando" Reyes
- Nico Antonio as Jacinto "Entoy" Santos
- Sancho delas Alas as Pat. Gregorio "Greco" Cortez
- Lorenzo Mara as Ruben
- Rhed Bustamante as Ana
- Kenken Nuyad as Aye
- Whitney Tyson as Elizabeth
- Donna Cariaga as Doray Mendoza
- Joven Olvido as Carlo "Caloy" Mendoza
- Nonong Ballinan as Ambo
- Ghersie Fantastico as Itong
- Prinsipe Makata as Mot
- Shantel Crislyn Layh "Ligaya" Ngujo as Ligaya Dungalo
- Rhian "Dang" Ramos as Amanda "Dang" Ignacio
- James "Paquito" Sagarino as Paquito Alvarado
- Jay Gonzaga as James Cordero
- Juliana Parizcova Segovia as Francisco/Francine
- Roy "Shernan" Gaite as Gido
- Pedro "Zaito" Canon Jr. as Nick

Guest cast

- Franco Laurel as Albert Hernandez
- Gian Magdangal as Damien Ocampo
- Rey Malonzo as P/MGen. Manuel Dela Cruz
- Raymart Santiago as P/Maj. Victor A. Basco
- Cogie Domingo as P/Cpt. Eric Opeña
- Jess Mendoza as P/Cpt. Henry Eugenio
- Mike Magat as P/Gen. (Chief PNP) Ernesto Peralta
- Ivan Carapiet as Cedrick
- Gardo Versoza as Lazaro "Uwak" Enriquez/Rodolfo Salazar (Note: Lazaro used the alias Rodolfo Salazar to conceal his identity from Diana Olegario.)
- Phoebe Walker as PS/MSgt. Catherine Parana
- Stacey Gabriel as P/MSgt. Tricia Almario
- Louise Gertrude as P/Lt. Isabel Tiongson
- Ana Jalandoni as P/Lt. Gelyn Gomez
- Jachin Manere as PS/MSgt. Celeste Miranda
- Leo Martinez as Bartolome "Kap Bart" C. Bulaan
- David Minemoto as David
- Baron Geisler as Dante "Bungo" S. Madarang and David S. Madarang
- Gerard Acao as Timo
- Mark Dionisio as Balisong
- Mark Manicad as P/Cpt. Edwin Salonga
- Denise Laurel as P/Maj. Alessandra "Alex" T. Romero
- Nico Gomez as P/Cpt. Benjamin Santos
- Nilo Frias as PS/MSgt. Roger Cueto
- Zandro Salgado as P/Lt. Christopher Hernandez
- Jasmine Mendoza as Madeleine Lee
- Empoy Marquez as Domingo "Domengsu" Suarez
- Mel Martinez as Mamu
- Dax Augustus as Augustus
- Nadia Montenegro as Nida
- Alynna Asistio as Vanessa
- Caloy Alde as Buloy
- Dexie Diaz as Dexie
- Sammie Rimando as Raquel
- John Manalo as Pitoy
- Zeus Collins as Fredo
- Victor Silayan as Joselito "Bolit" Laxamana
- Ronald Asinas as Bolit's Goon
- Denise Joaquin as Michelle Rivera
- Arron Villaflor as P/Cpt. Amir Marquez
- Mart Escudero as P/Lt. Karlo Ramos
- Josef Elizalde as P/Lt. Louie Rallos
- Kaiser Boado as P/MSgt. Eric Gabriel
- KC Montero as Lance Mendez
- Kean Cipriano as Migz
- Marc Abaya as Jacob Serrano
- Jennifer Lee as Chloe M. Delgado
- Jon Achaval as P/MGen. Felipe Romero
- Pinky Marquez as Rosario T. Romero
- Judy Ann Santos-Agoncillo as Jane Sebastian/Maureen de los Santos/Lovely/Kuya (Note: Judy Ann Santos' character Jane Sebastian suffers from dissociative identity disorder. Within her psyche, are three other distinct characters, namely: Maureen de los Santos who poses as a prostitute to lure her would-be victims; Lovely who represents Jane's personality as a child before she experienced the trauma that led to her disorder; and Kuya who acts as Jane's "protector" and is the dominant personality that undertakes the serial killing of the men that Maureen lures.)
- Yasmyne Suarez as young Jane
- Franki Russell as P/MSgt. Hannah Robles
- Diana Mackey as P/Lt. Samantha Salazar
- Jessica Marasigan as PS/MSgt. Lea Singson
- Romnick Sarmenta as Juan/Mark Quiambao/Lemuel Pineda (Note: Juan used the alias Mark Quiambao when he tried to fish out information regarding Cardo and Task Force Agila at Camp Crame. During his stint living next to Task Force Agila, he posed as Lemuel Pineda.)
- Jhay Bruce "Piniski" Garcia as Elias
- Janice Hung as Meilin Yang
- Carlos Siguion-Reyna as Ernesto Tordesillas
- Kim Molina as Kagawad Bea Malonzo
- Priscilla Almeda as Krista Sandoval
- Paul Montecillo as Luis "Whiskey" Quijano
- Iyannah Sumalpong as Kristelle "Letlet" Sandoval
- Robert Seña as Stanley Galvez
- Tirso Cruz III as Sec. Arturo "Art" M. Padua
- Jerald Napoles as Jimbo Padua
- Ara Mina as Ellen Padua
- Rhen Escaño as Clarice Padua
- Kara Mitzki as P/Lt. Serene Mendoza
- Ana Abad Santos as Ombudsman Castillo
- Dennis Raymundo as P/Cpt. Lawrence Raymundo
- Froilan Sales as Eduardo "Nico" Villamor
- Shaina Magdayao as P/Maj. Roxanne Opeña
- Barbie Imperial as P/Lt. Camille Villaluna
- Isabelle de Leon as P/Lt. Marielle Lazcano
- Neil Coleta as Miguel Clemente
- Richard Manabat as Alejandro Galvez

== Episodes ==
No. overall	No. in season	Title	Original air date	Kantar media rating (nationwide)
914	1	"Tahanan"	April 8, 2019	38.8%
915	2	"Pasalamat"	April 9, 2019	41.2%
916	3	"Kampihan"	April 10, 2019	38.4%
917	4	"Tungkulin"	April 11, 2019	37.6%
918	5	"Bagong Misyon"	April 12, 2019	39.1%
919	6	"Paglilingkod"	April 15, 2019	36.8%
920	7	"Kampo"	April 16, 2019	37.5%
921	8	"Training"	April 17, 2019	37.2%
922	9	"Lakas"	April 22, 2019	36.9%
923	10	"Puntirya"	April 23, 2019	36.5%
924	11	"Pinaginitan"	April 24, 2019	36.7%
925	12	"Seremonya"	April 25, 2019	35.2%
926	13	"Parangal"	April 26, 2019	35.6%
927	14	"Selebrasyon"	April 29, 2019	37.2%
928	15	"Unahan"	April 30, 2019	35.3%
929	16	"Sugal"	May 1, 2019	33.5%
930	17	"Sagutan"	May 2, 2019	36.3%
931	18	"Kasamaan"	May 3, 2019	33.7%
932	19	"Assignment"	May 6, 2019	36.5%
933	20	"Alyas Bungo"	May 7, 2019	37.6%
934	21	"Imahe"	May 8, 2019	36.6%
935	22	"Linisin"	May 9, 2019	37.0%
936	23	"PACTF"	May 10, 2019	34.9%
937	24	"Kidnap"	May 13, 2019	36.8%
938	25	"Raid"	May 14, 2019	40.0%
939	26	"Determinado"	May 15, 2019	36.0%
940	27	"Pagtatapat"	May 16, 2019	38.8%
941	28	"Hinala"	May 17, 2019	37.2%
942	29	"Dancer"	May 20, 2019	39.7%
943	30	"Bentahan"	May 21, 2019	38.3%
944	31	"Drug Bust"	May 22, 2019	39.0%
945	32	"Asset"	May 23, 2019	39.2%
946	33	"Flora's Garden"	May 24, 2019	35.3%
947	34	"Duda"	May 27, 2019	38.0%
948	35	"Rambol"	May 28, 2019	37.5%
949	36	"Nakamasid"	May 29, 2019	38.3%
950	37	"Sapang Bato"	May 30, 2019	37.9%
951	38	"Liwanag sa Dilim"	May 31, 2019	36.2%
952	39	"Planado"	June 3, 2019	36.6%
953	40	"Armado"	June 4, 2019	38.9%
954	41	"Agila at Bungo"	June 5, 2019	38.2%
955	42	"Aruga"	June 6, 2019	38.2%
956	43	"Imbitado"	June 7, 2019	36.1%
957	44	"Grand Opening"	June 10, 2019	37.5%
958	45	"Granada"	June 11, 2019	38.4%
959	46	"Gimbal"	June 12, 2019	35.4%
960	47	"Ingat"	June 13, 2019	36.4%
961	48	"Promotion"	June 14, 2019	36.2%
962	49	"Kasiyahan"	June 17, 2019	37.1%
963	50	"Gulatan"	June 18, 2019	38.6%
964	51	"Delikado"	June 19, 2019	37.8%
965	52	"Suyurin"	June 20, 2019	37.1%
966	53	"Pakikiramay"	June 21, 2019	37.5%
967	54	"Sabotahe"	June 24, 2019	36.2%
968	55	"Pahirapan"	June 25, 2019	38.4%
969	56	"Masamang Balita"	June 26, 2019	37.3%
970	57	"Panaghoy"	June 27, 2019	37.5%
971	58	"Naulila"	June 28, 2019	35.6%
972	59	"Kalungkutan"	July 1, 2019	37.5%
973	60	"Hideout"	July 2, 2019	38.8%
974	61	"Kumpirmado"	July 3, 2019	36.6%
975	62	"Banta"	July 4, 2019	35.9%
976	63	"Paghatid"	July 5, 2019	35.8%
977	64	"Libingan"	July 8, 2019	37.2%
978	65	"Nabihag"	July 9, 2019	37.0%
979	66	"Galugad"	July 10, 2019	39.3%
980	67	"Kasanib"	July 11, 2019	38.8%
981	68	"Lokasyon"	July 12, 2019	37.6%
982	69	"Atake"	July 15, 2019	40.1%
983	70	"Sagupaan"	July 16, 2019	43.9%
984	71	"Agaw Buhay"	July 17, 2019	40.0%
985	72	"Ipanalangin"	July 18, 2019	40.0%
986	73	"Kapit"	July 19, 2019	38.0%
987	74	"Pagdalaw"	July 22, 2019	36.2%
988	75	"Paguwi"	July 23, 2019	36.2%
989	76	"Nangangamba"	July 24, 2019	37.3%
990	77	"Unawa"	July 25, 2019	35.7%
991	78	"Tuloy ang Misyon"	July 26, 2019	35.0%
992	79	"Serial Killer"	July 29, 2019	35.2%
993	80	"Hatid"	July 30, 2019	36.1%
994	81	"Pagtatagpo"	July 31, 2019	36.2%
995	82	"Cardo at Jane"	August 1, 2019	35.5%
996	83	"Pakiramdam"	August 2, 2019	36.8%
997	84	"Salaysay"	August 5, 2019	37.1%
998	85	"Habol"	August 6, 2019	37.2%
999	86	"Kupkop"	August 7, 2019	34.6%
1000	87	"1000"	August 8, 2019	37.4%
1001	88	"Hinahanap"	August 9, 2019	34.2%
1002	89	"Ugali"	August 12, 2019	36.7%
1003	90	"Malagim"	August 13, 2019	36.5%
1004	91	"Imbestigasyon"	August 14, 2019	33.7%
1005	92	"Babae"	August 15, 2019	36.5%
1006	93	"Bisto"	August 16, 2019	33.7%
1007	94	"Habulan"	August 19, 2019	37.8%
1008	95	"Pagkatao"	August 20, 2019	36.6%
1009	96	"Dismayado"	August 21, 2019	36.4%
1010	97	"Suporta"	August 22, 2019	35.9%
1011	98	"Responsibilidad"	August 23, 2019	36.4%
1012	99	"Dahilan"	August 26, 2019	35.6%
1013	100	"Pagkikita"	August 27, 2019	36.5%
1014	101	"Sabwatan"	August 28, 2019	35.2%
1015	102	"Lead"	August 29, 2019	34.7%
1016	103	"Tensyon"	August 30, 2019	33.7%
1017	104	"Litrato"	September 2, 2019	33.1%
1018	105	"Opisyal"	September 3, 2019	34.7%
1019	106	"Palabas"	September 4, 2019	34.2%
1020	107	"Impormasyon"	September 5, 2019	34.2%
1021	108	"Angasan"	September 6, 2019	32.4%
1022	109	"Atensyon"	September 9, 2019	36.0%
1023	110	"Nagkukunwari"	September 10, 2019	34.9%
1024	111	"Transaksyon"	September 11, 2019	35.1%
1025	112	"Usap-usapan"	September 12, 2019	36.0%
1026	113	"Nagdududa"	September 13, 2019	34.3%
1027	114	"Desisyon"	September 16, 2019	37.3%
1028	115	"Halaga"	September 17, 2019	36.7%
1029	116	"Segurista"	September 18, 2019	36.7%
1030	117	"Akala"	September 19, 2019	N/A
1031	118	"Paniwala"	September 20, 2019	33.1%
1032	119	"Magtulungan"	September 23, 2019	35.5%
1033	120	"Alerto"	September 24, 2019	34.7%
1034	121	"Tugisan"	September 25, 2019	36.4%
1035	122	"Nadismaya"	September 26, 2019	34.3%
1036	123	"Bilib"	September 27, 2019	34.6%
1037	124	"Interrogation"	September 30, 2019	33.4%
1038	125	"Ihahatid"	October 1, 2019	35.7%
1039	126	"Inquest"	October 2, 2019	33.8%
1040	127	"Convoy"	October 3, 2019	35.4%
1041	128	"Shootout"	October 4, 2019	36.6%
1042	129	"Gapos"	October 7, 2019	35.7%
1043	130	"Bitag"	October 8, 2019	37.1%
1044	131	"Pagkawala"	October 9, 2019	35.3%
1045	132	"Handa"	October 10, 2019	35.2%
1046	133	"Pagtugis"	October 11, 2019	34.2%
1047	134	"Cardo vs. Bungo"	October 14, 2019	37.2%
1048	135	"Duelo"	October 15, 2019	37.2%
1049	136	"Respeto"	October 16, 2019	36.0%
1050	137	"Plano"	October 17, 2019	33.3%
1051	138	"Hakbang"	October 18, 2019	34.6%
1052	139	"Asinta"	October 21, 2019	35.2%
1053	140	"Habulin"	October 22, 2019	34.8%
1054	141	"Kampanya"	October 23, 2019	35.1%
1055	142	"Palakasan"	October 24, 2019	35.5%
1056	143	"Kumbinsihin"	October 25, 2019	33.5%
1057	144	"Proteksyon"	October 28, 2019	33.3%
1058	145	"Immunity"	October 29, 2019	33.2%
1059	146	"Balak"	October 30, 2019	34.8%
1060	147	"Nakumpirma"	October 31, 2019	31.9%
1061	148	"Paglusob"	November 1, 2019	30.1%
1062	149	"Salakay"	November 4, 2019	36.4%
1063	150	"Nakalusot"	November 5, 2019	36.1%
1064	151	"Mabahala"	November 6, 2019	35.9%
1065	152	"Napagtanto"	November 7, 2019	35.8%
1066	153	"Miting de Avance"	November 8, 2019	33.9%
1067	154	"Botohan"	November 11, 2019	34.5%
1068	155	"Iringan"	November 12, 2019	34.6%
1069	156	"Natagpuan"	November 13, 2019	34.3%
1070	157	"Proklamasyon"	November 14, 2019	34.3%
1071	158	"Kritikal"	November 15, 2019	36.5%
1072	159	"Pagkasawi"	November 18, 2019	37.8%
1073	160	"Pasimuno"	November 19, 2019	36.4%
1074	161	"Kaparusahan"	November 20, 2019	35.5%
1075	162	"Sandalan"	November 21, 2019	34.9%
1076	163	"Pagluluksa"	November 22, 2019	35.1%
1077	164	"Nakikiramay"	November 25, 2019	35.8%
1078	165	"Kaagapay"	November 26, 2019	34.7%
1079	166	"Kastigo"	November 27, 2019	31.9%
1080	167	"Bagong Salta"	November 28, 2019	33.2%
1081	168	"Pagsalakay"	November 29, 2019	34.0%
1082	169	"Kasunduan"	December 2, 2019	31.2%
1083	170	"Kinikilala"	December 3, 2019	26.1%
1084	171	"Kawanggawa"	December 4, 2019	27.9%
1085	172	"Pagtulong"	December 5, 2019	27.2%
1086	173	"Ronda"	December 6, 2019	25.6%
1087	174	"Imbitado"	December 9, 2019	30.0%
1088	175	"Preparasyon"	December 10, 2019	27.5%
1089	176	"Pakay"	December 11, 2019	28.0%
1090	177	"Pangamba"	December 12, 2019	28.0%
1091	178	"Kasal"	December 13, 2019	29.4%
1092	179	"Panganib"	December 16, 2019	31.8%
1093	180	"Paghabol"	December 17, 2019	31.0%
1094	181	"Pagtugis"	December 18, 2019	32.1%
1095	182	"Sugurin"	December 19, 2019	30.5%
1096	183	"Target"	December 20, 2019	30.2%
1097	184	"Kilalanin"	December 23, 2019	29.4%
1098	185	"Hinala"	December 24, 2019	23.6%
1099	186	"Sabwatan"	December 25, 2019	25.0%
1100	187	"Balak"	December 26, 2019	27.5%
1101	188	"Imbestigasyon"	December 27, 2019	27.6%
1102	189	"Impormasyon"	December 30, 2019	27.0%
1103	190	"Pahintulot"	December 31, 2019	22.4%
1104	191	"Bantayan"	January 1, 2020	25.7%
1105	192	"Pagmatyag"	January 2, 2020	28.8%
1106	193	"Komprontasyon"	January 3, 2020	29.3%
1107	194	"Linlang"	January 6, 2020	28.2%
1108	195	"Sumbong"	January 7, 2020	28.1%
1109	196	"Saklolo"	January 8, 2020	31.0%
1110	197	"Paglusob"	January 9, 2020	31.3%
1111	198	"Pagdamay"	January 10, 2020	31.5%
1112	199	"Ulila"	January 13, 2020	29.9%
1113	200	"Bagong Pamilya"	January 14, 2020	30.1%
1114	201	"Outing"	January 15, 2020	29.2%
1115	202	"Mapasaya"	January 16, 2020	29.3%
1116	203	"Protektahan"	January 17, 2020	31.5%
1117	204	"Saksi"	January 20, 2020	29.0%
1118	205	"Mapahamak"	January 21, 2020	29.7%
1119	206	"Magkaalaman"	January 22, 2020	29.4%
1120	207	"Pagkakilala"	January 23, 2020	30.9%
1121	208	"Back Up"	January 24, 2020	30.7%
1122	209	"Pakikibaka"	January 27, 2020	33.8%
1123	210	"Hulog"	January 28, 2020	33.2%
1124	211	"Kawalan"	January 29, 2020	31.6%
1125	212	"Dinadala"	January 30, 2020	32.3%
1126	213	"Akusasyon"	January 31, 2020	31.5%
1127	214	"Emosyonal"	February 3, 2020	31.7%
1128	215	"Warrant"	February 4, 2020	32.8%
1129	216	"Arestado"	February 5, 2020	33.7%
1130	217	"Dalaw"	February 6, 2020	34.5%
1131	218	"Tensyon"	February 7, 2020	34.2%
1132	219	"Silakbo"	February 10, 2020	34.9%
1133	220	"Suspendido"	February 11, 2020	34.1%
1134	221	"Paalala"	February 12, 2020	34.8%
1135	222	"Posisyon"	February 13, 2020	36.0%
1136	223	"Pinagbantaan"	February 14, 2020	33.3%
1137	224	"Nakamasid"	February 17, 2020	36.1%
1138	225	"Testigo"	February 18, 2020	35.3%
1139	226	"Litrato"	February 19, 2020	34.7%
1140	227	"Sagutan"	February 20, 2020	34.5%
1141	228	"Sugod sa Palasyo"	February 21, 2020	34.7%
1142	229	"Kaguluhan"	February 24, 2020	33.3%
1143	230	"Argumento"	February 25, 2020	32.9%
1144	231	"Dehado"	February 26, 2020	34.5%
1145	232	"Sagip"	February 27, 2020	32.6%
1146	233	"Alyana vs. Clarisse"	February 28, 2020	31.5%
1147	234	"Suporta"	March 2, 2020	35.4%
1148	235	"Kasiraan"	March 3, 2020	34.5%
1149	236	"Baliktad"	March 4, 2020	35.0%
1150	237	"Ratratan"	March 5, 2020	33.9%
1151	238	"Ganti"	March 6, 2020	33.5%
1152	239	"Bulabog"	March 9, 2020	33.1%
1153	240	"Katauhan"	March 10, 2020	33.4%
1154	241	"Kapalit"	March 11, 2020	33.6%
1155	242	"Kalagayan"	March 12, 2020	35.3%
1156	243	"Kahawig"	March 13, 2020	35.8%
1157	244	"Tuloy ang Laban"	June 15, 2020 (Note: The episode is the first of ten special rerun episodes which were aired for burning off due to the shutdown of production caused by the enhanced community quarantine in Luzon.)	N/A
1158	245	"Planta"	June 16, 2020	N/A
1159	246	"Arrest Warrant"	June 17, 2020	N/A
1160	247	"Akusado"	June 18, 2020	N/A
1161	248	"Rambol"	June 19, 2020	N/A
1162	249	"Katotohanan"	June 22, 2020	N/A
1163	250	"Kakampi"	June 23, 2020	N/A
1164	251	"Larawan"	June 24, 2020	N/A
1165	252	"Pinagsisihan"	June 25, 2020	N/A
1166	253	"Bugso"	June 26, 2020	N/A

Legend
Peak Season Rating
Lowest Season Rating
