= Ang Probinsyano season 6 =

Season of television series

Ang Probinsyano
- Season 6
- Second version of Season 6's title card commemorating its 3rd Anniversary.
- Starring: Coco Martin
- No. of episodes: 140

Release
- Original network: ABS-CBN
- Original release: September 24, 2018 – April 5, 2019

Season chronology
- ← Previous; Season 5 Next → Season 7

The sixth season of Ang Probinsyano, a Philippine action drama television series on ABS-CBN, premiered on September 24, 2018, on the network's Primetime Bida evening block and worldwide on The Filipino Channel. The season concluded on April 5, 2019, after 140 episodes, following its third anniversary celebration. The series stars Coco Martin as Senior Police Officer II Ricardo Dalisay, together with an ensemble cast.

The sixth season of Ang Probinsyano follows Cardo and Vendetta's continued struggle against Lucas Cabrera, now President of the Philippines, and Renato Hipolito. After rescuing the incumbent President Oscar Hidalgo from an assassination plot that results in him being replaced as president, Vendetta searches for a way to restore Hidalgo to his former position. She later deals with Don Emilio Syquia, who has reemerged from hiding under the name Señor Gustavo Torralba and now works with a criminal empire protected by the Cabrera administration.

As Vendetta makes its way back to Manila, they clash with Lily Ann Cortez (Lorna Tolentino), a baglady and bureaucrat within the Cabrera administration. Cortez tries to make the conflict between the two political groups more direct, hoping to gain control from whoever survives in the aftermath.

== Plot ==
The season begins with Vendetta gaining Oscar Hidalgo’s trust following another assassination attempt on his life, which they prevented alongside Cardo. Now aware of the true nature of his supposed political allies, Hidalgo resolves to regain the presidency that Lucas Cabrera unlawfully stole from him. Meanwhile, Lucas Cabrera chooses Albert Hernandez as his Vice President. General Borja is unlawfully detained and tortured by PNP Chief Alejandro Terante and his men.

While rescuing Borja with Vendetta, Cardo shoots Terante and kills all the policemen he used as escorts. Terante's men then successfully frame Billy, Mark, and Chikoy with a fake narcotics raid and capture them for interrogation. Aling Rosa informs Terante of Vendetta's whereabouts in exchange for the reward money they had promised.

The subsequent raid leads to Lolo Efren, Lola Melba, Marie, her parents, and seventeen policemen being killed. Cardo and his group manage to escape to a hospital and later Sto. Niño, although Bubbles, Anton, Patrick, and Diane are wounded in the process. Back in the compound, Rosa and her boyfriend are killed by one of Patrick's friends for disclosing Vendetta's location to the police.

Meanwhile, Hipolito discovers that Don Emilio survived the clash between him and Vendetta in Baguio, and now owns a mine and lives under the name Don Gustavo. The two agree to a deal i which Hipolito receives a share of Gustavo's income in exchange for overlooking the violations caused by his mining operations. JP and Teddy continue their crusade against the Cabrera administration by organising rallies in Quezon Memorial Circle, the Palace and other locations, which are eventually dispersed using police force. While visiting Baldo's group, Tyson and his men try to rape Bubbles and some of the other women present, but Jerome and Rigor stop them.

Renato Hipolito, Alakdan, and the Kamandag ambush Terante and kill him. They later also murder General Marquez, who suspects that Hipolito had a hand in the death. Cabrera's men abduct Virgie and hold her in a detention facility. JP is also sent there for his involvement in a rally at an outreach programme by Lucas and Brandon for the victims of Vendetta. Teddy and a group of policemen rescue them soon after.

In Sto. Niño, Romulo asks Vendetta to help him propose to Diana, and the two eventually marry. Cardo then decides that Vendetta should bury their weapons and attempt to live peacefully in the village. Their attempt at a peaceful life ends when Baldo and Tanggol's group attack Sto. Niño to abduct villagers and force them to work in Gustavo's mines. Several villagers are killed, while Vendetta is forced to fight back. Aubrey is fatally shot during the attack, while other members of the group are wounded. Vendetta escapes with the survivors and later finds shelter three mountains away.

Cardo and several members of Vendetta return to Sto. Niño to recover their buried weapons and rescue the villagers being held as forced labourers. They attack the groups controlling the village and free many of the remaining captives. Diana and the others follow Cardo's group, but are eventually separated and captured by Alakdan. Vendetta defeats the remaining forces of Baldo and Tanggol, with Cardo defeating Tanggol and allowing the abused villagers to take revenge on him. Romulo kills Baldo while avenging Aubrey's death, but is later fatally shot by Homer's men while attempting to rescue Diana. Diana and Bubbles are subsequently taken to Hipolito's hideout.

Meanwhile, fearing that the political prisoners could expose his administration's crimes, Lucas orders their execution. Billy, Mark, and Chikoy fight back, rescue the other prisoners, and escape. They later meet Teddy, who provides them with supplies and a weapon. In Manila, Margie publicly accuses Brandon of killing Mayor Adonis, whom Brandon murdered after Adonis refused to reveal Teddy's whereabouts. The Cabreras attempt to destroy Margie's reputation and discredit her accusations, but she continues pursuing the case despite the pressure from the administration. Brandon later arranges a staged vehicular accident intended to kill Margie, leaving her among the casualties.

Vendetta eventually attacks Gustavo's mine after learning of the conditions suffered by the forced laborers. A major battle follows, during which several of Gustavo's men are killed, and the slaves are freed. Cardo mortally wounds Gustavo and later shoots down the helicopter in which he attempts to escape, finally avenging his father's death. Vendetta then returns to Manila to rescue Diana and Bubbles and overthrow the Cabrera administration. At the same time, Lucas orders his forces to exploit the destruction in Sto. Niño by blaming Vendetta for the massacre and using the incident to turn public opinion against them.

The administration also begins targeting Lily Ann Cortez, who becomes increasingly disillusioned with the Cabreras after witnessing their failures and corruption. Lucas orders Brandon to monitor her and, if necessary, eliminate her. Vendetta eventually saves Lily from Gapuz and Pantig, who were attempting to kill her. Although Vendetta initially suspects that Lily is hiding her true motives, she gradually gains their trust and begins providing them with weapons, vehicles, and information. At the same time, Lily attempts to manipulate both Vendetta and the Cabreras for her own purposes.

Gustavo's personal affairs also collapse when he discovers that Madonna and Gascon are attempting to steal his wealth. After discovering their betrayal, Gustavo kills Gascon and later kills Madonna by detonating a bomb in her car. With Gustavo's mining operation destroyed, Hipolito turns his attention back to the Cabrera administration and the remaining sources of its illegal income.

After learning that Diana and Bubbles are being held hostage by Homer and Renato, Vendetta uses Lily's information to locate their hideout. Lily continues to work between the two sides, while Renato attempts to use the women as bait to lure Vendetta into a trap. Vendetta eventually attacks the hideout and rescues Diana and Bubbles. Cardo confronts Homer and defeats him, avenging the deaths of Diana's son Bernardo, Romulo, and Ricky Boy. Vendetta then prepares to confront the Cabreras directly.

Brandon, frustrated by his repeated failures to locate Vendetta, abducts the children cared for by Cardo in an attempt to force the group to reveal their location. Billy, Mark, and Chikoy rescue the children before Brandon can carry out his threat. Lily subsequently helps Vendetta locate Brandon, leading to a confrontation in which Cardo kills him. In retaliation for his son's death, Lucas orders his private army to attack the De Leon family. Makmak sacrifices himself to protect Lola Flora, while the remaining family members escape and reunite with Teddy's family.

Lucas then attempts to use Diana and Bubbles as bait to capture Vendetta. Vendetta launches another operation against Renato and Kamandag, successfully rescuing both women. During the confrontation, Anton sacrifices himself to protect Diana and is killed by Renato. Vendetta subsequently intercepts Lucas' convoy after Brandon's funeral. A firefight ensues, during which Cardo kills Lucas and Renato is wounded. The death of Lucas is met with widespread public celebration, while rallies in support of Vendetta are organised.

Following Anton's death, Oscar suggests that Vendetta surrender, but the group initially refuses. Oscar is eventually forced to betray them to have them arrested, although he intends to protect them from the government's charges. Vendetta surrenders and is taken into custody. Oscar returns to the presidency and publicly reveals how Lucas ordered his assassination, explaining that Vendetta had saved his life and should not be considered criminals. Renato survives the confrontation and begins planning his next move with Lily's assistance.

Vendetta is brought to court over the rebellion charges filed against them and pleads guilty. After Oscar assumes the presidency, his administration begins purging Lucas Cabrera's remaining allies, including Vice President Hernandez and other members of the so-called Midnight Cabinets who were involved in Lucas' corrupt administration. Makmak is cremated, and Vendetta returns to their damaged home while Oscar works to restore the government.

Lily later approaches both Cardo and Oscar while continuing her own plans. Oscar files pardon resolutions for Vendetta, and their eventual pardon is met with widespread celebrations. He also plans a celebration for Vendetta at the Palace. Meanwhile, Hipolito continues plotting against the new administration and works with Lily for his own interests. A task force is eventually formed to pursue the remaining members of Lucas Cabrera's circle, while Konsehala Gina attempts to use Vendetta's popularity to advance her own political ambitions.

== Cast and characters ==
Main cast

- Coco Martin as SPO2 Ricardo "Cardo" Dalisay (Note: The character's rank is based on §28, R.A. No. 6975 (Department of the Interior and Local Government Act of 1990), the law governing police ranks at the time the character appeared on and/or exited from the show. In the case of the members of Vendetta, they are still classified under R.A. No. 6975 because they went AWOL during the effectivity of the said law.)
- Edu Manzano as President Lucas Cabrera
- Jaime Fabregas as PDir. Delfin S. Borja
- Angel Aquino as BGen. Diana T. Olegario
- John Arcilla as Director Renato "Buwitre" Hipolito
- Rowell Santiago as President Oscar Hidalgo
- Jhong Hilario as Homer "Alakdan" Adlawan
- John Prats as SPO3 Jerome Girona Jr.
- Mark Anthony Fernandez as Brandon Cabrera
- Mitch Valdes as Konsehala Gina Magtanggol
- Yassi Pressman as Alyana R. Arevalo-Dalisay
- Ryza Cenon as Aubrey Hidalgo
- Lorna Tolentino as Lily Ann Cortez
- Susan Roces as Flora "Lola Kap" S. Borja-de Leon
- Eddie Garcia as Don Emilio Syquia/Señor Gustavo Torralba (Note: Emilio Syquia began using the alias Gustavo Torralba after surviving his near fatal encounter with Vendetta. Under this guise, Torralba presents himself as a Colombian businessman; moreover he has shifted his business interest to illegal mining.)
- Lito Lapid as Romulo "Leon" Dumaguit

Supporting cast

- Malou Crisologo as Yolanda "Yolly" Capuyao-Santos
- Marvin Yap as Elmo Santos
- John Medina as PS/Insp. Avel "Billy" M. Guzman
- Lester Llansang as PS/Insp. Mark Vargas
- Michael Roy Jornales as PS/Insp. Francisco "Chikoy" Rivera
- Marc Solis as SPO1 Rigor Soriano
- PJ Endrinal as Wally Nieves
- Pedro "Zaito" Canon Jr. as Nick
- Roy "Shernan" Gaite as Gido
- McNeal "Awra" Briguela as Macario "Makmak" Samonte Jr.
- James "Paquito" Sagarino as Paquito Alvarado
- Rhian "Dang" Ramos as Amanda "Dang" Ignacio
- Shantel Crislyn Layh "Ligaya" Ngujo as Ligaya Dungalo
- Joel Torre as Teodoro "Teddy" Arevalo/Juan Verdad (Note: Teddy Arevalo used the pen name Juan Verdad in his exposés against Lucas Cabrera's administration.)
- Shamaine Centenera-Buencamino as Virginia "Virgie" R. Arevalo
- McCoy de Leon as Juan Pablo "JP" R. Arevalo

Guest cast

- Michael de Mesa as Ramil "Manager" Taduran
- Mark Lapid as Anton "Tigre" del Mundo
- Ronwaldo Martin as Roldan/Gagamba
- Brian "Smugglaz" Lao as Marsial "Butete" Matero
- Lordivino "Bassilyo" Ignacio as Dante "Bulate" Villafuerte
- Sancho delas Alas as Gregorio "Greco" Cortez
- Bianca Manalo as Lourdes "Bubbles" Torres
- Jobert "Kuya Jobert" Austria as George "Wangbu" Espinosa
- David Minemoto as David
- Viveika Ravanes as Kapitana Dindi
- Carlo Mendoza as Tutoy Mendoza
- Joven Olvido as Carlo "Caloy" Mendoza
- Nonong Ballinan as Ambo
- Ghersie Fantastico as Itong
- Ces Aldaba as Marsing
- Eva Vibar as Nita
- Lala Vinzon as Lorie
- Whitney Tyson as Elizabeth
- Mel Feliciano as Mario
- Joross Gamboa as Tanggol
- Donna Cariaga as Doray Mendoza
- Jess Evardone as Primo
- Juan Miguel Severo as Fredo
- Mhot as Simon
- Prinsipe Makata as Mot
- Roderick Paulate as Mayor Adonis Dimaguiba
- Carmi Martin as Margarita "Margie" Corona
- Alora Sasam as Charlene Corona
- Amy Nobleza as Denise
- Juliana Parizcova Segovia as Francisco/Francine
- Rommel Padilla as Baldo
- Agnes Pabalan as Beth Espinosa
- Ced Torrecarion as Nico Espinosa
- Robert Arevalo as Efren Espinosa
- Marissa Delgado as Melba Espinosa
- CJ Ramos as Patrick Espinosa
- Sue Ramirez as Marie Espinosa
- Marlo Mortel as Noel Marasigan
- Nikko Natividad as Bong
- Soliman Cruz as P/DGen. (Chief PNP) Alejandro Terante
- Mystica as Rosa
- Rhed Bustamante as Ana
- Kenken Nuyad as Aye
- Kid Lopez as Adonis
- Pocholo Barretto as PC/MSgt. Demetrio Pantig (Note: The character's rank is based on R.A. No. 11200, the current law prescribing police ranks in the Philippines.)
- Franco Laurel as Vice President Albert Hernandez
- Gian Magdangal as Executive Secretary Damien Ocampo
- Ryan Eigenmann as Daniel Gascon H. Dela Vega
- Raph Fernandez as PE/MSgt. Juanito Gapuz
- Sarah Jane Abad as Snooki
- Mark "Big Mac" Andaya as Bruno
- Darwin "Hap Rice" Tolentino as Tyson
- Gio Marcelo as Akiro
- Ivana Alawi as Madonna Amor
- Alex Diaz as Jordan de Jesus
- Ariel Villasanta as Gapon
- Levi Ignacio as Diego
- Junjun Quintana as PS/Insp. Bueno
- Lance Serrano as PS/Insp. Cruz
- Daria Ramirez as Auring
- Arlene Muhlach as Loring
- Ella Cruz as Lisa
- Lorenzo Mara as Ruben
- Roger Calvin as Domeng
- Hyubs Azarcon as Rolando "Lando" Reyes
- Nico Antonio as Jacinto "Entoy" Santos
- Micah Muñoz as Mr. Valdez
- Rey Malonzo as P/MGen. Manuel G. Dela Cruz
- Eric Perez as Judge Rogelio Salvacion
- Raymart Santiago as P/Maj. Victor A. Basco

== Episodes ==
No. overall	No. in season	Title	Original air date	Kantar media rating (nationwide)
774	1	"Dulog"	September 24, 2018	44.8%
775	2	"Pananaw"	September 25, 2018	43.6%
776	3	"Kaisa"	September 26, 2018	42.9%
777	4	"Hantungan"	September 27, 2018	43.5%
778	5	"Huling Yakap"	September 28, 2018	42.8%
779	6	"Maingat"	October 1, 2018	43.6%
780	7	"Tiyempo"	October 2, 2018	43.5%
781	8	"Ospital"	October 3, 2018	43.5%
782	9	"Set Up"	October 4, 2018	47.2%
783	10	"Kapiling"	October 5, 2018	43.4%
784	11	"Kakampi"	October 8, 2018	44.6%
785	12	"Abuso"	October 9, 2018	44.8%
786	13	"Corrupt"	October 10, 2018	42.5%
787	14	"Panganib"	October 11, 2018	42.5%
788	15	"Pahirap"	October 12, 2018	43.6%
789	16	"Kontrol"	October 15, 2018	45.7%
790	17	"Target"	October 16, 2018	43.9%
791	18	"Namataan"	October 17, 2018	43.0%
792	19	"Dakip"	October 18, 2018	45.0%
793	20	"Lusob"	October 19, 2018	45.9%
794	21	"Kanlungan"	October 22, 2018	44.8%
795	22	"Pagtatakpan"	October 23, 2018	43.7%
796	23	"Bistado"	October 24, 2018	43.0%
797	24	"Pangamba"	October 25, 2018	43.4%
798	25	"Frame Up"	October 26, 2018	42.1%
799	26	"Suplong"	October 29, 2018	42.1%
800	27	"Pinagkanulo"	October 30, 2018	41.1%
801	28	"Sugod"	October 31, 2018	39.8%
802	29	"Araw ng Pagtugis"	November 1, 2018	38.9%
803	30	"Emergency"	November 2, 2018	41.6%
804	31	"Hostage"	November 5, 2018	41.8%
805	32	"Tip"	November 6, 2018	43.4%
806	33	"Imbestiga"	November 7, 2018	42.4%
807	34	"Pagbabalik"	November 8, 2018	43.5%
808	35	"Liblib"	November 9, 2018	41.8%
809	36	"Hayag"	November 12, 2018	39.6%
810	37	"Pinagbuklod"	November 13, 2018	40.8%
811	38	"Balita"	November 14, 2018	38.0%
812	39	"Dasal"	November 15, 2018	39.8%
813	40	"Paghaharap"	November 16, 2018	37.6%
814	41	"Pwersa"	November 19, 2018	40.1%
815	42	"Saklolo"	November 20, 2018	42.8%
816	43	"Kontra"	November 21, 2018	41.7%
817	44	"Kalaban"	November 22, 2018	40.6%
818	45	"Paninindigan"	November 23, 2018	39.7%
819	46	"Pananakot"	November 26, 2018	40.4%
820	47	"Pagbawi"	November 27, 2018	41.0%
821	48	"Sinisigaw"	November 28, 2018	39.8%
822	49	"Agresibo"	November 29, 2018	38.2%
823	50	"Darating"	November 30, 2018	34.7%
824	51	"Bantay"	December 3, 2018	35.3%
825	52	"Tuso"	December 4, 2018	40.3%
826	53	"Dulog"	December 5, 2018	37.2%
827	54	"Peligro"	December 6, 2018	38.7%
828	55	"Bihag"	December 7, 2018	36.5%
829	56	"Huli"	December 10, 2018	39.4%
830	57	"Dawit"	December 11, 2018	39.6%
831	58	"Damdamin"	December 12, 2018	36.3%
832	59	"Seguridad"	December 13, 2018	37.8%
833	60	"Katarungan"	December 14, 2018	37.2%
834	61	"Harana"	December 17, 2018	39.5%
835	62	"Nawawala"	December 18, 2018	38.0%
836	63	"Sorpresa"	December 19, 2018	35.4%
837	64	"Dusa"	December 20, 2018	35.3%
838	65	"Minahan"	December 21, 2018	36.7%
839	66	"Misa"	December 24, 2018	26.9%
840	67	"Magkasama"	December 25, 2018	29.6%
841	68	"Naaalala"	December 26, 2018	33.7%
842	69	"Pagtitimpi"	December 27, 2018	35.7%
843	70	"Pagaalala"	December 28, 2018	36.1%
844	71	"Regalo"	December 31, 2018	25.6%
845	72	"Kalinga"	January 1, 2019	35.2%
846	73	"Sapul"	January 2, 2019	36.0%
847	74	"Salo Salo"	January 3, 2019	37.6%
848	75	"Parusa"	January 4, 2019	37.5%
849	76	"Hangad"	January 7, 2019	37.6%
850	77	"Salamat"	January 8, 2019	38.6%
851	78	"Magkaisa"	January 9, 2019	37.8%
852	79	"Proposal"	January 10, 2019	40.1%
853	80	"Kalagayan"	January 11, 2019	36.8%
854	81	"Hinaharap"	January 14, 2019	36.7%
855	82	"Sumpaan"	January 15, 2019	37.5%
856	83	"Pangako"	January 16, 2019	38.1%
857	84	"Pwersahan"	January 17, 2019	39.5%
858	85	"Karahasan"	January 18, 2019	41.1%
859	86	"Kasawian"	January 21, 2019	41.8%
860	87	"Dalamhati"	January 22, 2019	41.4%
861	88	"Dagok"	January 23, 2019	40.6%
862	89	"Warning"	January 24, 2019	41.6%
863	90	"Hantungan"	January 25, 2019	39.8%
864	91	"Karamay"	January 28, 2019	41.6%
865	92	"Nagluluksa"	January 29, 2019	41.7%
866	93	"Desidido"	January 30, 2019	40.6%
867	94	"Magmatyag"	January 31, 2019	41.8%
868	95	"Awa"	February 1, 2019	41.0%
869	96	"Tapang"	February 4, 2019	43.4%
870	97	"Tagapagligtas"	February 5, 2019	45.1%
871	98	"Bakbakan"	February 6, 2019	43.3%
872	99	"Kawalan"	February 7, 2019	44.3%
873	100	"Tunggalian"	February 8, 2019	42.2%
874	101	"Pinuno"	February 11, 2019	44.4%
875	102	"Hinagpis"	February 12, 2019	41.8%
876	103	"Bugso"	February 13, 2019	42.6%
877	104	"Paghahanda"	February 14, 2019	41.3%
878	105	"Nagaalala"	February 15, 2019	39.1%
879	106	"Pasakit"	February 18, 2019	41.0%
880	107	"Alanganin"	February 19, 2019	40.0%
881	108	"Bagong Pinuno"	February 20, 2019	42.3%
882	109	"Traydor"	February 21, 2019	39.5%
883	110	"Manman"	February 22, 2019	40.6%
884	111	"Sadya"	February 25, 2019	40.8%
885	112	"Aksidente"	February 26, 2019	43.4%
886	113	"Cardo vs. Don Emilio"	February 27, 2019	44.6%
887	114	"Hustisya"	February 28, 2019	43.3%
888	115	"Lalaban"	March 1, 2019	40.7%
889	116	"Hukay"	March 4, 2019	41.5%
890	117	"Takot"	March 5, 2019	40.9%
891	118	"Paglisan"	March 6, 2019	41.4%
892	119	"Balik Maynila"	March 7, 2019	41.5%
893	120	"Silong"	March 8, 2019	39.8%
894	121	"Lily"	March 11, 2019	40.4%
895	122	"Tiwala"	March 12, 2019	40.8%
896	123	"Dalaw"	March 13, 2019	41.5%
897	124	"Ambush"	March 14, 2019	43.3%
898	125	"Pagtatago"	March 15, 2019	40.3%
899	126	"Lihim"	March 18, 2019	42.4%
900	127	"Sinungaling"	March 19, 2019	42.5%
901	128	"Pagkuha"	March 20, 2019	41.1%
902	129	"Kaligtasan"	March 21, 2019	42.6%
903	130	"Ganti"	March 22, 2019	43.5%
904	131	"Lugmok"	March 25, 2019	43.4%
905	132	"Pighati"	March 26, 2019	44.5%
906	133	"Cardo vs. Homer"	March 27, 2019	44.8%
907	134	"Pagtutuos"	March 28, 2019	46.8%
908	135	"Damayan"	March 29, 2019	44.6%
909	136	"Harapan"	April 1, 2019	43.7%
910	137	"Hatol"	April 2, 2019	41.9%
911	138	"Pagasa"	April 3, 2019	40.1%
912	139	"Malaya"	April 4, 2019	42.0%
913	140	"Panimula"	April 5, 2019	38.8%

Legend
Peak Season Rating
Lowest Season Rating
