= Ang Probinsyano season 8 =

Season of television series

Ang Probinsyano
- Season 8
- Second version of Season 8's title card commemorating its 5th Anniversary with the "Tuloy ang Laban" tag.
- Starring: Coco Martin
- No. of episodes: 278

Release
- Original network: Kapamilya Channel; Cine Mo!; Jeepney TV; A2Z; TV5
- Original release: June 29, 2020 – August 20, 2021

Season chronology
- ← Previous; Season 7 Next → Season 9

The eighth season of Ang Probinsyano, a Philippine action drama television series, aired from June 29, 2020, to August 20, 2021, on Kapamilya Channel, A2Z and TV5. The series stars Coco Martin as P/Cpt. Ricardo Dalisay, together with an ensemble cast.

The eighth season of Ang Probinsyano picks up from the end of the seventh season, whose end coincided with the 2020 Luzon enhanced community quarantine, as it shows Lily's move to consolidate her power as both the first lady of the Republic and leader of the largest international drug cartel in the Philippines.

== Plot ==
President Hidalgo has fallen into a drug-induced coma and Lily has made the most of this opportunity to finally consolidate her powers as the First Lady of the Republic and as the country's drug baroness, along with Arturo. To ensure their success, Renato puts a bounty on Cardo and his family in order to finally rid them of the biggest thorn on their side. Lily and Art then called their henchmen to take out Cardo and his family. Juan was the first to spot Cardo, instigating a shootout with him, which Clarice unexpectedly witnessing it. Cardo was able to injure Juan in the ankle, forcing Juan to retreat.

== Cast and characters ==
Main cast

- Coco Martin as P/Cpt. Ricardo "Cardo" Dalisay
- Yassi Pressman as Kapitana Alyana R. Arevalo-Dalisay
- John Arcilla as Renato "Buwitre" Hipolito
- Angel Aquino as Diana T. Olegario
- Rowell Santiago as Pres. Oscar Hidalgo and Mariano (Note: President Hidalgo's body double employed in order to make sure a succession in the office does not occur despite the real Hidalgo's absence.)
- Jaime Fabregas as Delfin S. Borja
- Shamaine Centenera-Buencamino as Virginia "Virgie" R. Arevalo
- John Prats as PC/MSgt. Jerome Girona, Jr.
- Bianca Manalo as Lourdes "Bubbles" Torres
- Michael de Mesa as Pat. Ramil "Manager" Taduran
- Joel Torre as Teodoro "Teddy" Arevalo (Note: Teddy Arevalo used the pen name Jose Malaya in his exposés against Lily and her allies.)
- Lorna Tolentino as First Lady Lily Ann Cortez-Hidalgo
- Susan Roces as Flora "Lola Kap" S. Borja-de Leon

Supporting cast

- Marc Abaya as Jacob Serrano
- Tirso Cruz III as Sec. Arturo "Art" M. Padua
- Ara Mina as Ellen Padua
- Malou Crisologo as Yolanda "Yolly" Capuyao-Santos
- Marvin Yap as Elmo Santos
- PJ Endrinal as Wally Nieves
- Lester Llansang as P/Cpt. Mark Vargas
- John Medina as P/Cpt. Avel "Billy" M. Guzman
- Marc Solis as P/MSgt. Rigor Soriano
- CJ Ramos as Pat. Patrick Espinosa
- Daria Ramirez as Auring
- Jobert "Kuya Jobert" Austria as Pat. George "Wangbu" Espinosa
- Bryan "Smugglaz" Lao as Pat. Marsial "Butete" Matero
- Lordivino "Bassilyo" Ignacio as Pat. Dante "Bulate" Villafuerte
- Hyubs Azarcon as P/MSgt. Rolando "Lando" Reyes
- Raymart Santiago as P/Maj. Victor A. Basco
- Shaina Magdayao as P/Maj. Roxanne Opeña
- Dennis Raymundo as P/Cpt. Lawrence Raymundo
- Nico Antonio as Jacinto "Entoy" Santos
- Sancho delas Alas as Pat. Gregorio "Greco" Cortez
- Lorenzo Mara as Ruben
- Whitney Tyson as Elizabeth
- Donna Cariaga as Doray Mendoza
- Joven Olvido as Carlo “Caloy” Mendoza
- Nonong Ballinan as Ambo
- Ghersie Fantastico as Itong
- Prinsipe Makata as Mot

Guest cast

- John Joseph Tuason as Mr. Chen
- Eric Nicolas as Ramon
- Marissa Sanchez as Maring
- Maynard Lapid as Salvador
- Richard Gutierrez as Angelito "Lito" Valmoria
- Mark Leviste as Antonio
- Julian Roxas as Julian
- Jeolanie Sacdalan as Berto
- Seth Fedelin as Macoy
- Val Iglesias as Turo
- Kevin de Vela as Vito
- Edwin Pandagani as Mr. Reyes
- Jupeter Villanueva as Mr. Calavera
- Albert Langitan as Mr. Gonzales
- Marlon Mance as Dr. Nuevas
- Benjie Paraan as Ruben
- Angelo Valmoria Roxas as Bong Barrera
- James D.C Olipas as Eljin Ramirez
- Kenjie Calindatas as Bunyi
- Johnmark Taraje as Tyron
- Vance Larena as PS/Sgt. Ivan Ponce
- Geoff Eigenmann as P/Maj. Albert De Vela
- Jane De Leon as P/Cpt. Natalia "Lia" Mante
- Mark McMahon as P/Cpt. Cris Fabia
- Paolo Paraiso as P/Cpt. David Alcantara
- AJ Raval as P/Cpt. Andrea Villar
- Ed Albe Pandagani as Col. Sarmiento
- Bubbles Paraiso as Lara Vera
- Drey Brown as Malena
- Jamina Cruz as Margarita
- Zeppi Borromeo as Derick
- Franco Daza as Santiago
- Neil Coleta as Miguel Clemente
- Maika Rivera as Cassandra Jose
- Mitoy Yonting as Teban
- Giselle Sanchez as Pilar
- John Rollie Gabayno as Harold
- Soldier (Coco Martin's pet dog) as Soldier (Col. Pelaez's pet dog)
- Peter Georgo as Mr. Wood
- Dini Ouattara as Dini (Mr. Wood's bodyguard)
- Chris Perris as Mr. Hanson
- Michael Millz as Michael (Mr. Hanson's bodyguard)
- Cristina Gonzales as Amalia Mante
- Simon Ibarra as Enrique Vera
- William Lorenzo as Berting
- Paulo Angeles as P/Lt. Jim De Castro
- Enzo Pineda as P/Cpt. Alvin Cuevas
- Christian Vasquez as Atty. Fernando Mante (Note: Fernando used the alias Benedicto Vergel, whom under the said alias has his "second" family in which he hide his secret to his main family. He had his connection with Cardo using his Vergel alias in the 2nd season.)
- Aya Fernandez as Dr. Audrey Mante
- Elaine Ochoa as P/Cpt. Victoria "Vicky" Cruz
- Danny Ramos as Winston Cabral

== Episodes ==
No. overall	No. in season	Title	Original air date (Note: iWantTFC shows two episodes first in advance before it broadcasts on TV.)	AGB Nielsen Ratings (NUTAM People)
1167	1	"Bagong Laban"	June 29, 2020	N/A
1168	2	"Hostage"	June 30, 2020	N/A
1169	3	"Hindi Susuko"	July 1, 2020	N/A
1170	4	"Takas"	July 2, 2020	N/A
1171	5	"Patibong"	July 3, 2020	N/A
1172	6	"Nakaligtas"	July 6, 2020	N/A
1173	7	"Silong"	July 7, 2020	N/A
1174	8	"Wanted"	July 8, 2020	N/A
1175	9	"Pagtakas"	July 9, 2020	N/A
1176	10	"Ugnayan"	July 10, 2020	N/A
1177	11	"Tawag"	July 13, 2020	N/A
1178	12	"Nagbabalik"	July 14, 2020	N/A
1179	13	"Pangako"	July 15, 2020	N/A
1180	14	"Alalahanin"	July 16, 2020	N/A
1181	15	"Pananabik"	July 17, 2020	N/A
1182	16	"Muling Pinagtagpo"	July 20, 2020	N/A
1183	17	"Cardo at Lito"	July 21, 2020	N/A
1184	18	"Imbitasyon"	July 22, 2020	N/A
1185	19	"Karibal"	July 23, 2020	N/A
1186	20	"Alinlangan"	July 24, 2020	N/A
1187	21	"Kayamanan"	July 27, 2020	N/A
1188	22	"Kagustuhan"	July 28, 2020	N/A
1189	23	"Sagabal"	July 29, 2020	N/A
1190	24	"Alok"	July 30, 2020	N/A
1191	25	"Trabaho"	July 31, 2020	N/A
1192	26	"Tuloy ang Laban"	August 31, 2020	N/A
1193	27	"Paghahanda"	September 1, 2020	N/A
1194	28	"Pagninilbihan"	September 2, 2020	N/A
1195	29	"Utang na Loob"	September 3, 2020	N/A
1196	30	"Magsumikap"	September 4, 2020	N/A
1197	31	"Kakayahan"	September 7, 2020	N/A
1198	32	"Pakikitungo"	September 8, 2020	N/A
1199	33	"Katuwang"	September 9, 2020	N/A
1200	34	"Pagkatiwalaan"	September 10, 2020	N/A
1201	35	"Nagkukunwari"	September 11, 2020	1.5%
1202	36	"Nakapagtataka"	September 14, 2020	N/A
1203	37	"Naghihintay"	September 15, 2020	N/A
1204	38	"Suportahan"	September 16, 2020	N/A
1205	39	"Pagsilbihan"	September 17, 2020	N/A
1206	40	"Pinasusundan"	September 18, 2020	N/A
1207	41	"Kondisyon"	September 21, 2020	2.1%
1208	42	"Pangarap"	September 22, 2020	2.6%
1209	43	"Alitan"	September 23, 2020	N/A
1210	44	"Pera"	September 24, 2020	N/A
1211	45	"Pirma"	September 25, 2020	N/A
1212	46	"Pananakot"	September 28, 2020	2.5%
1213	47	"Napapalapit"	September 29, 2020	2.8%
1214	48	"Sabihin"	September 30, 2020	N/A
1215	49	"Promoted"	October 1, 2020	N/A
1216	50	"Asawa"	October 2, 2020	N/A
1217	51	"Minamahal"	October 5, 2020	2.3%
1218	52	"Gabay"	October 6, 2020	2.7%
1219	53	"Aking Mahal"	October 7, 2020	N/A
1220	54	"Mapaniwala"	October 8, 2020	N/A
1221	55	"Aberya"	October 9, 2020	2.0%
1222	56	"Pagsunod"	October 12, 2020	1.8%
1223	57	"Sinungaling"	October 13, 2020	2.0%
1224	58	"Mamagitan"	October 14, 2020	N/A
1225	59	"Naglilihim"	October 15, 2020	N/A
1226	60	"Gusto"	October 16, 2020	1.5%
1227	61	"Mapalagay"	October 19, 2020	1.4%
1228	62	"Katanungan"	October 20, 2020	N/A
1229	63	"Magingat"	October 21, 2020	N/A
1230	64	"Natunton"	October 22, 2020	N/A
1231	65	"Nahumaling"	October 23, 2020	1.3%
1232	66	"Magtiwala"	October 26, 2020	1.3%
1233	67	"Tatakas"	October 27, 2020	2.0%
1234	68	"Habulin"	October 28, 2020	N/A
1235	69	"Pagsisisi"	October 29, 2020	2.1%
1236	70	"Parusa"	October 30, 2020	N/A
1237	71	"Ilusyon"	November 2, 2020	1.9%
1238	72	"Bagong Bihis"	November 3, 2020	N/A
1239	73	"Tampuhan"	November 4, 2020	N/A
1240	74	"Makabangga"	November 5, 2020	N/A
1241	75	"Iskandalo"	November 6, 2020	N/A
1242	76	"Mahusay"	November 9, 2020	2.6%
1243	77	"Tingin"	November 10, 2020	N/A
1244	78	"Sikreto"	November 11, 2020	N/A
1245	79	"Magtimpi"	November 12, 2020	N/A
1246	80	"Alaga"	November 13, 2020	4.0%
1247	81	"Hinanakit"	November 16, 2020	4.6%
1248	82	"Pagkukulang"	November 17, 2020	N/A
1249	83	"Ginalingan"	November 18, 2020	3.8%
1250	84	"Alinlangan"	November 19, 2020	4.2%
1251	85	"Tutol"	November 20, 2020	3.7%
1252	86	"Kwintas"	November 23, 2020	4.2%
1253	87	"Naninibago"	November 24, 2020	N/A
1254	88	"Kinamusta"	November 25, 2020	3.8%
1255	89	"Sumbong"	November 26, 2020	4.6%
1256	90	"Resbak"	November 27, 2020	N/A
1257	91	"Tulong"	November 30, 2020	N/A
1258	92	"Dalawa"	December 1, 2020	4.2%
1259	93	"Palaisipan"	December 2, 2020	4.7%
1260	94	"Umiwas"	December 3, 2020	N/A
1261	95	"Imposible"	December 4, 2020	N/A
1262	96	"Karamdaman"	December 7, 2020	5.2%
1263	97	"Payo"	December 8, 2020	5.1%
1264	98	"Katabi"	December 9, 2020	3.9%
1265	99	"Pagtatalo"	December 10, 2020	5.4%
1266	100	"Emergency"	December 11, 2020	4.8%
1267	101	"Pakiusap"	December 14, 2020	N/A
1268	102	"Pakawalan"	December 15, 2020	N/A
1269	103	"Isa Lang"	December 16, 2020	N/A
1270	104	"Nahihibang"	December 17, 2020	N/A
1271	105	"Magsaya"	December 18, 2020	N/A
1272	106	"Pikon"	December 21, 2020	N/A
1273	107	"Palabas"	December 22, 2020	N/A
1274	108	"Kasalanan"	December 23, 2020	N/A
1275	109	"Pagkakamali"	December 24, 2020	N/A
1276	110	"Pagmamahalan"	December 25, 2020	4.9%
1277	111	"Mapilit"	December 28, 2020	N/A
1278	112	"Kutob"	December 29, 2020	N/A
1279	113	"Pagtataksil"	December 30, 2020	N/A
1280	114	"Relasyon"	December 31, 2020	N/A
1281	115	"Konsensya"	January 1, 2021	N/A
1282	116	"Atraso"	January 4, 2021	4.5%
1283	117	"Bumawi"	January 5, 2021	5.2%
1284	118	"Magkaayos"	January 6, 2021	N/A
1285	119	"Laglag"	January 7, 2021	N/A
1286	120	"Dekorasyon"	January 8, 2021	6.2%
1287	121	"Checkpoint"	January 11, 2021	5.2%
1288	122	"Balakid"	January 12, 2021	4.6%
1289	123	"Salubong"	January 13, 2021	5.6%
1290	124	"Shoot to Kill"	January 14, 2021	5.0%
1291	125	"Patibong"	January 15, 2021	4.6%
1292	126	"Delikado"	January 18, 2021	4.6%
1293	127	"Boses"	January 19, 2021	5.4%
1294	128	"Pwersahan"	January 20, 2021	6.6%
1295	129	"Black Ops"	January 21, 2021	7.4%
1296	130	"Crossfire"	January 22, 2021	7.2%
1297	131	"Habang Buhay"	January 25, 2021	8.4%
1298	132	"Pighati"	January 26, 2021	N/A
1299	133	"Burol"	January 27, 2021	N/A
1300	134	"Panaghoy"	January 28, 2021	N/A
1301	135	"Dakip"	January 29, 2021	N/A
1302	136	"Pagkawala"	February 1, 2021	7.4%
1303	137	"Paggising"	February 2, 2021	7.0%
1304	138	"Paghihirap"	February 3, 2021	6.8%
1305	139	"Pagtanggi"	February 4, 2021	7.6%
1306	140	"Desisyon"	February 5, 2021	8.2%
1307	141	"Kakampi"	February 8, 2021	N/A
1308	142	"Banta"	February 9, 2021	N/A
1309	143	"Kaharap"	February 10, 2021	N/A
1310	144	"Duda"	February 11, 2021	N/A
1311	145	"Paalam, Alyana"	February 12, 2021	N/A
1312	146	"Pagtatapat"	February 15, 2021	N/A
1313	147	"Nangungulila"	February 16, 2021	N/A
1314	148	"Pag-asa"	February 17, 2021	N/A
1315	149	"Pagsuko"	February 18, 2021	N/A
1316	150	"Tuso"	February 19, 2021	N/A
1317	151	"Katapatan"	February 22, 2021	8.2%
1318	152	"Alaala"	February 23, 2021	8.2%
1319	153	"Kalungkutan"	February 24, 2021	8.6%
1320	154	"Grupo"	February 25, 2021	N/A
1321	155	"Salakay"	February 26, 2021	7.6%
1322	156	"Desperado"	March 1, 2021	8.0%
1323	157	"Kasunduan"	March 2, 2021	5.5%
1324	158	"Utakan"	March 3, 2021	5.6%
1325	159	"Paghahanda"	March 4, 2021	N/A
1326	160	"Determinado"	March 5, 2021	5.0%
1327	161	"Lokasyon"	March 8, 2021	7.9%
1328	162	"Rescue"	March 9, 2021	9.2%
1329	163	"Habulan"	March 10, 2021	8.8%
1330	164	"Agaw Buhay"	March 11, 2021	9.8%
1331	165	"Hinagpis"	March 12, 2021	9.6%
1332	166	"Kapatawaran"	March 15, 2021	8.9%
1333	167	"Ama"	March 16, 2021	8.7%
1334	168	"Sikil"	March 17, 2021	8.3%
1335	169	"Yabang"	March 18, 2021	N/A
1336	170	"Tutukan"	March 19, 2021	9.1%
1337	171	"Maghihiganti"	March 22, 2021	8.7%
1338	172	"Mapusok"	March 23, 2021	N/A
1339	173	"Manloloko"	March 24, 2021	9.0%
1340	174	"Hakbang"	March 25, 2021	9.4%
1341	175	"Target"	March 26, 2021	9.2%
1342	176	"Pakikipaglaban"	March 29, 2021	9.2%
1343	177	"Kwarto"	March 30, 2021	10.5%
1344	178	"Galit"	March 31, 2021	10.1%
1345	179	"Cardo vs. Lia"	April 5, 2021	9.3%
1346	180	"Pahihirapan"	April 6, 2021	9.8%
1347	181	"Gagamitin"	April 7, 2021	9.4%
1348	182	"Pagkakilala"	April 8, 2021	8.8%
1349	183	"Silong"	April 9, 2021	8.2%
1350	184	"Patago"	April 12, 2021	N/A
1351	185	"Tukso"	April 13, 2021	N/A
1352	186	"Utusan"	April 14, 2021	N/A
1353	187	"Kaisa"	April 15, 2021	9.1%
1354	188	"Pakitang Gilas"	April 16, 2021	8.5%
1355	189	"Hahanapin"	April 19, 2021	9.2%
1356	190	"Daan"	April 20, 2021	8.3%
1357	191	"Manipula"	April 21, 2021	9.3%
1358	192	"Palihim"	April 22, 2021	10.0%
1359	193	"Paniniwala"	April 23, 2021	N/A
1360	194	"Diversion"	April 26, 2021	9.1%
1361	195	"Dahas"	April 27, 2021	9.3%
1362	196	"Pagtugis"	April 28, 2021	N/A
1363	197	"Masusukol"	April 29, 2021	9.3%
1364	198	"Barilan"	April 30, 2021	9.5%
1365	199	"Kontrol"	May 3, 2021	N/A
1366	200	"Hawak"	May 4, 2021	N/A
1367	201	"Lumayas"	May 5, 2021	9.5%
1368	202	"Posisyon"	May 6, 2021	10.0%
1369	203	"Kasangga"	May 7, 2021	9.9%
1370	204	"Hostage"	May 10, 2021	10.2%
1371	205	"Bantay Sarado"	May 11, 2021	10.2%
1372	206	"Napapalibutan"	May 12, 2021	10.4%
1373	207	"Onsehan"	May 13, 2021	10.6%
1374	208	"Double Cross"	May 14, 2021	10.6%
1375	209	"Nagalala"	May 17, 2021	10.2%
1376	210	"Pinaghandaan"	May 18, 2021	N/A
1377	211	"Konsensya"	May 19, 2021	11.0%
1378	212	"Sisingilin"	May 20, 2021	N/A
1379	213	"Alas"	May 21, 2021	10.6%
1380	214	"Paguwi"	May 24, 2021	11.0%
1381	215	"Sisihan"	May 25, 2021	11.3%
1382	216	"Unahan"	May 26, 2021	11.1%
1383	217	"Hudas"	May 27, 2021	N/A
1384	218	"Defensive"	May 28, 2021	N/A
1385	219	"Perimeter"	May 31, 2021	10.9%
1386	220	"Back Up"	June 1, 2021	11.3%
1387	221	"Kapit"	June 2, 2021	11.6%
1388	222	"Buwis Buhay"	June 3, 2021	11.4%
1389	223	"Mapupuntahan"	June 4, 2021	11.9%
1390	224	"Tahanan"	June 7, 2021	11.9%
1391	225	"Gamutin"	June 8, 2021	11.7%
1392	226	"Paglabag"	June 9, 2021	12.0%
1393	227	"Nakaratay"	June 10, 2021	11.1%
1394	228	"Trato"	June 11, 2021	11.6%
1395	229	"Malinis"	June 14, 2021	11.2%
1396	230	"Bulabog"	June 15, 2021	N/A
1397	231	"Ipit"	June 16, 2021	11.2%
1398	232	"Dismayado"	June 17, 2021	N/A
1399	233	"Leader"	June 18, 2021	N/A
1400	234	"Lusob"	June 21, 2021	10.5%
1401	235	"Pagtutuos"	June 22, 2021	10.7%
1402	236	"Ambisyon"	June 23, 2021	N/A
1403	237	"Bawi"	June 24, 2021	11.0%
1404	238	"Pagbayarin"	June 25, 2021	11.0%
1405	239	"Patunay"	June 28, 2021	10.4%
1406	240	"Payuhan"	June 29, 2021	N/A
1407	241	"Nararamdaman"	June 30, 2021	10.2%
1408	242	"Salawahan"	July 1, 2021	N/A
1409	243	"Interes"	July 2, 2021	9.2%
1410	244	"Problema"	July 5, 2021	10.6%
1411	245	"Paghanga"	July 6, 2021	10.6%
1412	246	"Pangunahan"	July 7, 2021	10.0%
1413	247	"Magkimkim"	July 8, 2021	10.1%
1414	248	"Tagasunod"	July 9, 2021	10.1%
1415	249	"Nakamasid"	July 12, 2021	10.4%
1416	250	"Headquarters"	July 13, 2021	11.0%
1417	251	"Interrogation"	July 14, 2021	N/A
1418	252	"Atake"	July 15, 2021	11.3%
1419	253	"Iwanan"	July 16, 2021	N/A
1420	254	"Magsinungaling"	July 19, 2021	10.6%
1421	255	"Makasarili"	July 20, 2021	10.6%
1422	256	"Kamalian"	July 21, 2021	10.6%
1423	257	"Damay"	July 22, 2021	10.5%
1424	258	"Kaba"	July 23, 2021	9.7%
1425	259	"Lapastangan"	July 26, 2021	10.7%
1426	260	"Kapahamakan"	July 27, 2021	10.7%
1427	261	"Salarin"	July 28, 2021	N/A
1428	262	"Kamay"	July 29, 2021	11.6%
1429	263	"Tulungan"	July 30, 2021	10.8%
1430	264	"Gantihan"	August 2, 2021	10.8%
1431	265	"Hagupit"	August 3, 2021	10.7%
1432	266	"Pendeho"	August 4, 2021	N/A
1433	267	"Bisto"	August 5, 2021	12.0%
1434	268	"Biktima"	August 6, 2021	10.7%
1435	269	"Pakana"	August 9, 2021	11.4%
1436	270	"Paalisin"	August 10, 2021	11.3%
1437	271	"Sagabal"	August 11, 2021	11.8%
1438	272	"Alyansa"	August 12, 2021	12.5%
1439	273	"Tangka"	August 13, 2021	10.0%
1440	274	"Kinaroroonan"	August 16, 2021	11.1%
1441	275	"Kasamaan"	August 17, 2021	11.5%
1442	276	"Alisto"	August 18, 2021	N/A
1443	277	"Dagit"	August 19, 2021	11.5%
1444	278	"Kawala"	August 20, 2021	11.8%

Legend
Peak Season Rating
Lowest Season Rating
