= Ang Probinsyano season 5 =

Season of television series

Ang Probinsyano
- Season 5
- Starring: Coco Martin
- No. of episodes: 135

Release
- Original network: ABS-CBN
- Original release: March 15 – September 21, 2018

Season chronology
- ← Previous; Season 4 Next → Season 6

The fifth season of Ang Probinsyano, a Philippine action drama television series, premiered on March 15, 2018, on ABS-CBN's Primetime Bida evening block and worldwide on The Filipino Channel. It concluded on September 21, 2018, with a total of 135 episodes. The series stars Coco Martin as Ricardo Dalisay, alongside an ensemble cast.

The fifth season follows Cardo and Vendetta as they confront corruption in the larger Philippine political arena. Vendetta not only battles Kamandag, a terrorist group supported by Renato Hipolito, but also faces a gun-running syndicate operated by the Vice President of the Philippines, Lucas Cabrera.

Although Hipolito and Cabrera belong to the same political party, they conspire to eliminate Vendetta and advance their own ambitions. Hipolito seeks to secure the top spot in the midterm senatorial elections, which he plans to use as a springboard to the presidency in the next national elections. Cabrera, meanwhile, aims to dominate the Senate with his allies, with Hipolito as Senate President, to guarantee his own victory in the presidential race. Cabrera, however, remains unaware that Hipolito intends to betray him in order to claim the presidency for himself.

== Plot ==
Marco (JC Santos) formally introduces Alyana (Yassi Pressman) to the Cabrera family. His half-brother, Congressman Brandon Cabrera (Mark Anthony Fernandez), supports their relationship, but their father, Vice President Lucas Cabrera (Edu Manzano), fears it will harm his presidential ambitions. His wife, Second Lady Catherine Cabrera (Alice Dixson), pretends to welcome Alyana to avoid conflict with Marco. Meanwhile, Cardo (Coco Martin) continues to pursue Alyana but is rejected when she finally returns his wedding ring. Marco's increasingly violent behavior becomes apparent as he pressures Alyana to marry him against her will, even resorting to threats of suicide after a car accident nearly claims his life.

At the same time, General Diana Olegario (Angel Aquino) secretly enlists General Delfin Borja (Jaime Fabregas) for assistance, unaware that her secretary James (Jay Gonzaga) is being tailed by Major Catindig (Sid Lucero) for Director Renato Hipolito (John Arcilla). Hipolito orders Alakdan (Jhong Hilario) to launch an attack on Vendetta, which costs the lives of Kalabaw (Rey Solo) and Jimboy (Jayson Gainza). Romulo (Lito Lapid) survives Hipolito's attempt to personally kill him and is taken into custody by the CIDG, but Hipolito manipulates his way into supervising Romulo's case. Cardo disguises himself as a doctor to attempt a rescue at the hospital, where he meets nurse Andrea "Andy" Collins (Jessy Mendiola). Andy and her family later join Vendetta after the group rescues her mother and several women from a human trafficking syndicate. With Andy's help, Vendetta eventually succeeds in liberating Romulo from Hipolito's guards, while President Oscar Hidalgo (Rowell Santiago) begins to question Hipolito's corruption.

As Lucas, Brandon, and Hipolito consolidate their political power, Vendetta intensifies efforts to expose their crimes. Vendetta rescues teachers and workers exploited by Brandon's syndicate, winning sympathy from the public and even the President, who starts to recognize the group's humanitarian role. However, Marco grows increasingly unstable, directing his jealousy and violent outbursts at Alyana, to the dismay of her parents Teddy and Virgie. His behavior worsens until he confronts Alyana's family and eventually joins an armed assault against Cardo and Vendetta. In a deadly gunfight, Marco and his men are killed, leaving Catherine devastated and Lucas vowing vengeance against Vendetta.

Lucas escalates his schemes by using General Terante (Soliman Cruz) and Hipolito to stage attacks and frame Vendetta, while also orchestrating the kidnapping of religious leader Brother Lorenzo Alano (Rey Abellana). When Vendetta rescues Lorenzo and exposes Brandon's involvement, Brandon is imprisoned, though Lucas deflects blame through press manipulation. Later, Lucas and Hipolito plot election fraud with presidential aide William Celerio (Bobby Andrews), but Vendetta intercepts tampered voting machines, leading to Hipolito's defeat. Lucas, enraged, pushes harder to annihilate Vendetta, even as the group strengthens its alliance with Oscar after rescuing him from an assassination attempt that killed his wife and two children. Initially hostile to Vendetta, Oscar eventually realizes Lucas was responsible for his family's murder and aligns himself with Cardo.

As Lucas assumes the presidency after declaring Oscar dead, Hipolito and Terante gain high-ranking government positions and intensify their crackdown on Vendetta. Lola Flora and her household suffer displacement and harassment orchestrated by Gina and her cohorts, while Cardo and Alyana reconcile, remarry, and return to Manila. Vendetta continues to expose corruption, rescuing civilians from abuse, while Lucas resorts to increasingly brutal measures to consolidate power. The conflict culminates with Oscar, now rescued and sheltered by Vendetta, embracing their cause to cleanse the government of Lucas, Hipolito, and their allies.

== Cast and characters ==
=== Main cast ===
- Coco Martin as SPO2 Ricardo "Cardo" Dalisay
- Edu Manzano as President Lucas Cabrera
- Jaime Fábregas as P/Dir. Delfin S. Borja
- Angel Aquino as BGen. Diana T. Olegario
- John Arcilla as Director Renato "Buwitre" Hipolito
- Rowell Santiago as Oscar Hidalgo
- Jolo Revilla as PSG Commander Harold Casilag
- Jhong Hilario as Homer "Alakdan" Adlawan
- John Prats as SPO3 Jerome Girona Jr.
- Sid Lucero as Maj. Manolo "Nolo" Cantindig
- Mark Anthony Fernandez as Congressman Brandon Cabrera
- Bobby Andrews as Special Assistant to the President William Celerio
- Mitch Valdes as Konsehala Gina Magtanggol
- Yassi Pressman as Alyana R. Arevalo-Dalisay
- J. C. Santos as Marco Cabrera
- Ryza Cenon as Aubrey Hidalgo
- Francis Magundayao as Yohan Hidalgo
- Dawn Zulueta as First Lady Marissa Hidalgo (Note: Marissa Hidalgo was written off the show as the First Lady of the Philippines, hence she is credited as such)
- Alice Dixson as Second Lady Catherine Cabrera (Note: Catherine Cabrera left the show before Lucas Cabrera's ascencion to the Presidency, thus she is still billed as the second lady because the title was never explicitly used by the character on the show.)
- Susan Roces as Flora "Lola Kap" S. Borja-de Leon
- Eddie Garcia as Don Emilio Syquia
- Lito Lapid as Romulo "Leon" Dumaguit

=== Supporting cast ===
- Malou Crisologo as Yolanda "Yolly" Capuyao-Santos
- Marvin Yap as Elmo Santos
- Long Mejia as Francisco "Paco" Alvarado
- John Medina as PS/Insp. Avel "Billy" M. Guzman
- Lester Llansang as PS/Insp. Mark Vargas
- Michael Roy Jornales as PS/Insp. Francisco "Chikoy" Rivera
- Marc Solis as SPO1 Rigor Soriano
- Benj Manalo as Felipe "Pinggoy" Tanyag Jr.
- PJ Endrinal as Wally Nieves
- Pedro "Zaito" Canon Jr. as Nick
- Roy "Shernan" Gaite as Gido
- Jay Gonzaga as James Cordero
- Arlene Tolibas as Marikit Flores
- McNeal "Awra" Briguela as Macario "Makmak" Samonte Jr.
- James "Paquito" Sagarino as Paquito Alvarado
- Rhian "Dang" Ramos as Amanda "Dang" Ignacio
- Shantel Crislyn Layh "Ligaya" Ngujo as Ligaya Dungalo
- Enzo Pelojero as Dexter Flores
- Nayomi "Heart" Ramos as Mary Grace Hidalgo
- Joel Torre as Teodoro "Teddy" Arevalo
- Shamaine Centenera-Buencamino as Virginia "Virgie" R. Arevalo
- McCoy de Leon as Juan Pablo "JP" R. Arevalo

=== Guest cast ===
- Michael de Mesa as Ramil "Manager" Taduran
- Mark Lapid as Anton "Tigre" del Mundo
- Ronwaldo Martin as Roldan/Gagamba
- Gene Padilla as Pilo/Tuko
- Jayson Gainza as Jimboy Escaño
- Brian "Smugglaz" Lao as Marsial "Butete" Matero
- Lordivino "Bassilyo" Ignacio as Dante "Bulate" Villafuerte
- Sancho delas Alas as Gregorio "Greco" Cortez
- Rey Solo as Kalabaw
- Benzon Dalina as Barakuda
- David Minemoto as David
- Bianca Manalo as Lourdes "Bubbles" Torres
- Anghel Marcial as Happy
- Matet de Leon as Menchu Versoza
- Jobert "Kuya Jobert" Austria as George "Wangbu" Espinosa
- Mara Alberto as Halina
- Minnie Aguilar as Rebecca "Becky" Balaraw
- Nicco Manalo as Stephen "Peng" Balaraw
- Jessy Mendiola Andrea "Andi" B. Collins, RN/ Violet
- MC Muah as Lala
- Gwen Garci as Hasmin
- Jaycee Parker as Marigold
- Zara Lopez as Dalia
- Maui Taylor as Rose
- Katya Santos as Blossom
- Andy Kunz as Mr. Gibson
- Viveika Ravanes as Kapitana Dindi
- Arnold Cortez as Mayor Rolando Magpantag
- Ali Khatibi as Joaquin Campos
- Rey "PJ" Abellana as Brother Lorenzo Alano
- Mayen Estanero as Teacher Cecil
- Arvic Tan as Xavier
- Carlo Mendoza as Tutoy Mendoza
- Joven Olvido as Carlo "Caloy" Mendoza
- Nonong Ballinan as Ambo
- Ghersie Fantastico as Itong
- Ces Aldaba as Marsing
- Eva Vivar as Nita
- Lala Vinzon as Lorie
- Whitney Tyson as Elizabeth
- Mel Feliciano as Mario
- Joross Gamboa as Tanggol
- Donna Cariaga as Doray Mendoza
- Jess Evardone as Primo
- Juan Miguel Severo as Fredo
- Mhot as Simon
- Prinsipe Makata as Mot
- Roderick Paulate as Mayor Adonis Dimaguiba
- Carmi Martin as Margarita "Margie" Corona
- Alora Sasam as Charlene Corona
- Amy Nobleza as Denise
- Juliana Parizcova Segovia as Francisco/Francine
- Rommel Padilla as Baldo
- Alvin Fortuna as PC/Supt. Perez
- Agnes Pabalan as Beth Espinosa
- Ced Torrecarion as Nico Espinosa
- Robert Arevalo as Efren Espinosa
- Marissa Delgado as Melba Espinosa
- CJ Ramos as Patrick Espinosa
- Sue Ramirez as Marie Espinosa
- Marlo Mortel as Noel Marasigan
- Nikko Natividad as Bong
- Soliman Cruz as P/DGen. (Chief PNP) Alejandro Terante
- Mystica as Rosa
- Rhed Bustamante as Ana
- Kenken Nuyad as Aye
- Kid Lopez as Adonis

== Episodes ==
No. overall	No. in season	Title	Original air date	Kantar media rating (nationwide)
639	1	"Pamilya Cabrera"	March 15, 2018	39.6%
640	2	"Hinusgahan"	March 16, 2018	38.9%
641	3	"Crossfire"	March 19, 2018	41.8%
642	4	"Hininga"	March 20, 2018	40.9%
643	5	"Authority"	March 21, 2018	43.5%
644	6	"Paunahan"	March 22, 2018	42.1%
645	7	"Pamilya Hidalgo"	March 23, 2018	39.7%
646	8	"Kalkulado"	March 26, 2018	41.0%
647	9	"Bantay Salakay"	March 27, 2018	42.0%
648	10	"Ideya"	March 28, 2018	40.6%
649	11	"Pwersahan"	April 2, 2018	40.8%
650	12	"Gwardyado"	April 3, 2018	41.3%
651	13	"Makalusot"	April 4, 2018	39.1%
652	14	"Armas"	April 5, 2018	39.9%
653	15	"Solusyon"	April 6, 2018	38.0%
654	16	"Pinaplano"	April 9, 2018	40.9%
655	17	"Medalya"	April 10, 2018	40.2%
656	18	"Yate"	April 11, 2018	41.5%
657	19	"Dagat"	April 12, 2018	41.8%
658	20	"Tahanan"	April 13, 2018	40.3%
659	21	"Patawad"	April 16, 2018	40.5%
660	22	"Harang"	April 17, 2018	40.3%
661	23	"Dismayado"	April 18, 2018	42.6%
662	24	"Paguusap"	April 19, 2018	42.1%
663	25	"Naguunahan"	April 20, 2018	41.6%
664	26	"Sumalakay"	April 23, 2018	43.0%
665	27	"Pinaghihinalaan"	April 24, 2018	42.2%
666	28	"Pinagtatakpan"	April 25, 2018	42.8%
667	29	"Nasorpresa"	April 26, 2018	42.0%
668	30	"Hatid Sundo"	April 27, 2018	39.2%
669	31	"Salisihan"	April 30, 2018	41.2%
670	32	"Dayaan"	May 1, 2018	41.2%
671	33	"Suhol"	May 2, 2018	42.5%
672	34	"Fake News"	May 3, 2018	40.9%
673	35	"Sirain"	May 4, 2018	39.4%
674	36	"Trolls"	May 7, 2018	41.0%
675	37	"Dahas"	May 8, 2018	40.3%
676	38	"Takutin"	May 9, 2018	39.6%
677	39	"Kilalanin"	May 10, 2018	39.7%
678	40	"Anunsyo"	May 11, 2018	41.4%
679	41	"Depensa"	May 14, 2018	37.4%
680	42	"Susundan"	May 15, 2018	40.8%
681	43	"Magmatyag"	May 16, 2018	40.2%
682	44	"Regalo"	May 17, 2018	41.8%
683	45	"Sumaklolo"	May 18, 2018	39.9%
684	46	"Paratangan"	May 21, 2018	40.3%
685	47	"Kabangga"	May 22, 2018	41.3%
686	48	"Tinututukan"	May 23, 2018	39.5%
687	49	"Source Code"	May 24, 2018	42.4%
688	50	"Warrant"	May 25, 2018	39.6%
689	51	"Counting Machine"	May 28, 2018	40.9%
690	52	"Manipula"	May 29, 2018	42.5%
691	53	"Sabotahe"	May 30, 2018	42.0%
692	54	"Bantay Boto"	May 31, 2018	42.5%
693	55	"Eleksyon"	June 1, 2018	39.4%
694	56	"Tagumpay"	June 4, 2018	42.4%
695	57	"Pagtitiwala"	June 5, 2018	43.0%
696	58	"Liham"	June 6, 2018	41.3%
697	59	"Nababahala"	June 7, 2018	40.5%
698	60	"Summons"	June 8, 2018	42.8%
699	61	"Magkikita"	June 11, 2018	44.0%
700	62	"Magkasama"	June 12, 2018	42.1%
701	63	"Liblib"	June 13, 2018	44.4%
702	64	"Threat"	June 14, 2018	42.8%
703	65	"Tinakasan"	June 15, 2018	41.4%
704	66	"Huli Ka"	June 18, 2018	43.1%
705	67	"Nagdaramdam"	June 19, 2018	42.9%
706	68	"Babantayan"	June 20, 2018	41.8%
707	69	"Delikado"	June 21, 2018	43.3%
708	70	"Iniiwasan"	June 22, 2018	42.5%
709	71	"Pinagtulungan"	June 25, 2018	45.0%
710	72	"Tatakutin"	June 26, 2018	43.7%
711	73	"Memories"	June 27, 2018	44.6%
712	74	"Namimiss"	June 28, 2018	43.9%
713	75	"Sulyap"	June 29, 2018	40.2%
714	76	"Kiss Be With You"	July 2, 2018	39.2%
715	77	"Balagtasan"	July 3, 2018	42.9%
716	78	"Sayaw"	July 4, 2018	45.3%
717	79	"Tanong"	July 5, 2018	44.4%
718	80	"Pakiramdam"	July 6, 2018	42.5%
719	81	"Malaya Ka Na"	July 9, 2018	43.7%
720	82	"Kung Wala Ka"	July 10, 2018	44.9%
721	83	"Balikan"	July 11, 2018	44.8%
722	84	"Babawi"	July 12, 2018	46.2%
723	85	"Pasyal"	July 13, 2018	43.1%
724	86	"Mabuo"	July 16, 2018	41.2%
725	87	"Tinuldukan"	July 17, 2018	44.4%
726	88	"Makilala"	July 18, 2018	43.1%
727	89	"Marry Me Again"	July 19, 2018	42.2%
728	90	"Pagbigyang Muli"	July 20, 2018	42.1%
729	91	"Just Married Again"	July 23, 2018	40.8%
730	92	"Maligaya"	July 24, 2018	43.2%
731	93	"Higanti"	July 25, 2018	43.5%
732	94	"Bistado"	July 26, 2018	42.1%
733	95	"Nakabangga"	July 27, 2018	38.3%
734	96	"Tensyon"	July 30, 2018	42.4%
735	97	"Nahuli"	July 31, 2018	41.7%
736	98	"Silakbo"	August 1, 2018	40.5%
737	99	"Magkakasama"	August 2, 2018	42.7%
738	100	"Gipitan"	August 3, 2018	41.3%
739	101	"Napapaligiran"	August 6, 2018	43.9%
740	102	"Bala sa Bala"	August 7, 2018	46.1%
741	103	"Mano Mano"	August 8, 2018	43.2%
742	104	"Tagpo"	August 9, 2018	46.3%
743	105	"Mapanganib"	August 10, 2018	44.1%
744	106	"Nakatakas"	August 13, 2018	44.5%
745	107	"Galit"	August 14, 2018	45.2%
746	108	"Maghihiganti"	August 15, 2018	42.5%
747	109	"Peligroso"	August 16, 2018	40.9%
748	110	"Bumisita"	August 17, 2018	40.7%
749	111	"Damay"	August 20, 2018	40.8%
750	112	"Pipigain"	August 21, 2018	40.0%
751	113	"Taliwas"	August 22, 2018	40.0%
752	114	"Konektado"	August 23, 2018	39.5%
753	115	"Takot"	August 24, 2018	39.5%
754	116	"Lakas ng Loob"	August 27, 2018	39.9%
755	117	"Palitan"	August 28, 2018	41.0%
756	118	"Guilty"	August 29, 2018	39.1%
757	119	"Deadline"	August 30, 2018	38.5%
758	120	"Full Alert"	August 31, 2018	38.7%
759	121	"Galugad"	September 3, 2018	42.9%
760	122	"Seguridad"	September 4, 2018	42.3%
761	123	"Kasado"	September 5, 2018	42.5%
762	124	"Alerto"	September 6, 2018	43.2%
763	125	"Trap"	September 7, 2018	45.5%
764	126	"Corner"	September 10, 2018	46.1%
765	127	"Krisis"	September 11, 2018	44.6%
766	128	"Kritikal"	September 12, 2018	45.0%
767	129	"Malubha"	September 13, 2018	44.6%
768	130	"Pagmulat"	September 14, 2018	41.8%
769	131	"Kontrolado"	September 17, 2018	39.3%
770	132	"Panunumpa"	September 18, 2018	42.4%
771	133	"Diskumpyado"	September 19, 2018	41.6%
772	134	"Pinagluluksa"	September 20, 2018	42.5%
773	135	"Ililigtas"	September 21, 2018	44.3%

Legend
Peak Season Rating
Lowest Season Rating
