= Saranggola =

- Film poster
- Directed by: Gil Portes
- Written by: Jose Y. Dalisay Jr.; Gil Portes
- Produced by: Marco M. Capistrano
- Starring: Ricky Davao; Lester Llansang; Jennifer Sevilla
- Edited by: Tara Illenberger
- Music by: Joy Marfil; Vehnee Saturno
- Production company: Teamwork Productions
- Distributed by: GMA Films
- Release date: June 23, 1999
- Running time: 87 minutes
- Country: Philippines
- Language: Filipino

Saranggola (international title: The Kite) is a 1999 Filipino drama film directed by Gil Portes, who co-wrote the film's story and screenplay with Jose Y. Dalisay Jr. It stars Ricky Davao, Lester Llansang and Jennifer Sevilla. It is a morality tale, showing murder and corruption through the eyes of a child.

Produced by Teamwork Productions and distributed by GMA Films, the film was theatrically released on June 23, 1999.

== Plot ==
Though widowed, ex-cop, Homer, (Ricky Davao) is a kindly father to his ten-year-old son, Rex (Lester Llansang). He is considered to be something of a bully in the poor Manila neighborhood where he lives. After mistaking a child retrieving a snarled kite for a burglar, Homer kills the boy and then hurriedly tries to cover up his error. Unbeknownst to his dad, Rex witnessed the event, too. As the two separately wrestle with their consciences, the neighbors find out and chaos soon ensues.

== Cast ==
- Ricky Davao as Homer Agustines
- Lester Llansang as Rex Agustines
- Jennifer Sevilla as Anita
- Mark Gil as Jack Lumauig
- Sining Blanco as Enye Bumanlag
- Daryl Reyes as Tonton Bumanlag
- Connie Chua as Tonton's mother
- Nanding Josef as Tonton's father
- Roy Alvarez as Cong. Ventura
- RR Herrera as Leo Ventura
- Aleth dela Cruz as Aling Karing
- Diding Andres as Pacing
- Nonong Talbo as Mang Kadyo
- Mar Gachitorena as Senior Cop
- Tess Orias as Ms. Rojo

== Reception ==
Isah Red of the Manila Standard gave Saranggola a positive review, calling the film thematically challenging. He praises director Gil Portes for focusing on how the crime affects the relationship of the father and son, in the form of Jan Svěrák's Kolya. Though he considers the film's premise as encouraging, he criticizes the film's pacing.

== Awards and nominations ==
The film won several awards at the 1999 Manila Film Festival including: Best Picture, Best Actor (Ricky Davao), Best Original Story, Best Screenplay (Gil Portes and Butch Dalisay) and Best Theme Song. It was also nominated for the Golden St. George at the 21st Moscow International Film Festival. Ricky Davao was also hailed as Best Actor at the 1999 Cinemanila International Film Festival for this film.

In 2000, the film won the FAMAS Best Child Actor Award (Lester Llansang) and was nominated for four more awards (Best Picture, Best Director, Best Screenplay and Best Actor (Ricky Davao)) at the FAMAS Awards. It also won the Gawad Urian Award for Best Actor (Ricky Davao) and was nominated for 5 more awards at the 2000 Gawad Urian Awards. In the same year it won the Original Screenplay of the Year (Gil Portes and Butch Dalisay) and the Actor of the Year (Ricky Davao) and was nominated for 3 more awards at the Star Awards for Movies.

The film was also the Philippines' official entry to: the Academy Awards (Oscars); the 2000 Young Artists Award, where it was nominated for Best International Film and Best Performance in an International Film (Lester Llansang); the 2000 Indian Film Festival; and other international film festivals.
