= Lester Llansang =

Filipino actor (born 1985)

- Born: 3 July 1985 (age 40); Manila, Philippines
- Occupation: Actor
- Years active: 1993–present

Lester Ferrer Salansang (born July 3, 1985), known professionally as Lester Llansang, is a Filipino actor who appeared in the film Saranggola when he was 14 years old. He plays the role of a schoolboy who witnessed a crime committed by his policeman father. He was awarded Best Child Actor in FAMAS for this role. He also appeared in the movie Ang Galing-galing Mo, Babes.

== Early life ==
Llansang is the youngest offspring of Danilo Salansang and Jemmalyn Ferrer. He was born on July 3, 1985, and is the sibling of Windilou and Cindy. He then grew up with his grandfather Carlos and later with his grandmother Virginia Salansang.

== Career ==
In 1994 he starred in Pedro Penduko and as “Ding” in Mars Ravelo’s Darna: Ang Pagbabalik (1994), as Juan and in 1999, Llansang appeared in film Saranggola. In 2012 Llansang is the horror film Shake, Rattle and Roll Fourteen: The Invasion. From 2015 until 2020, Llansang is cast in the television series FPJ's Ang Probinsyano as Mark Vargas.

== Filmography ==
=== Film ===
Year	Title	Role	Note(s)	Ref(s).
1992	Shotgun Banjo	Young Marvin		
1994	Mars Ravelo's Darna! Ang Pagbabalik	Ding		
1998	My Guardian Debil	Boyet		
1999	Saranggola	Rex Agustines		
2014	Shake, Rattle and Roll Fourteen: The Invasion	Zombie 2	"Lost Command" section	
2019	3pol Trobol: Huli Ka Balbon!	Dewey		

=== Television series ===
- Bad Genius - as Fidel (2025–2026)
- Totoy Bato - Albie (2025–2026)
- Suntok sa Buwan - Warden Bennie (2022)
- Wansapanataym: Amazing Ving – Police Officer (2017)
- Ipaglaban Mo!: Kapalit ng Pag-ibig - Noel (2015)
- FPJ's Ang Probinsyano – P/Cpt. Mark Vargas (2015–2020)
- Nathaniel – Dexter Malgapo (2015)
- Magpakailanman: Love Me for What I Am – Teacher Marvin (2015)
- Ikaw Lamang - Calixto Dela Cruz (2014)
- Magpakailanman: Ang Babaeng may Dalawang Buhay – Engr. Mike (2014)
- Regal Shocker – Bukaw (2012)
- Real Confessions – Various Roles (2010–2011)
- Wag Kukurap – Noel (2005)
- Magpakailanman: Laban sa Magandang Kinabukasan – Ernesto (2005)
- Leya, ang Pinakamagandang Babae sa Ilalim ng Lupa – Aries (2004)
- Ang Iibigin ay Ikaw (2002)
- Click – Booj (1999)
- T.G.I.S. - Casper (1995)
- Maalaala Mo Kaya - Various Roles (1992–2018)
