= List of first ministers of Scotland by education =

Universities attended by Scottish first ministers
University	Number of first ministers
University of Glasgow	3
University of Edinburgh	2
University of Cambridge	1
University of St Andrews	1
University of Stirling	1
Edinburgh Napier University	1
Heriot-Watt University	1

A bar chart of universities attended by Scottish first ministers.

A list of first ministers of the Scotland and the educational institutions they attended. As of January 2024, every first minister has been university-educated with a minimum honours degree. Of the eight first ministers to date, all eight attended universities in Scotland, with three attending the University of Glasgow. Six UK prime ministers were also educated in Scotland: three at the University of Edinburgh and three the University of Glasgow.

Two of Scotland's eight first ministers attended a fee-paying high school, Donald Dewar and Humza Yousaf. All eight attended state primary schools.

Three first ministers pursued degrees in law, two working as solicitors (Nicola Sturgeon and Donald Dewar), the other an advocate (Jim Wallace). Only one first minister of Scotland, Jim Wallace, has attended an English university.

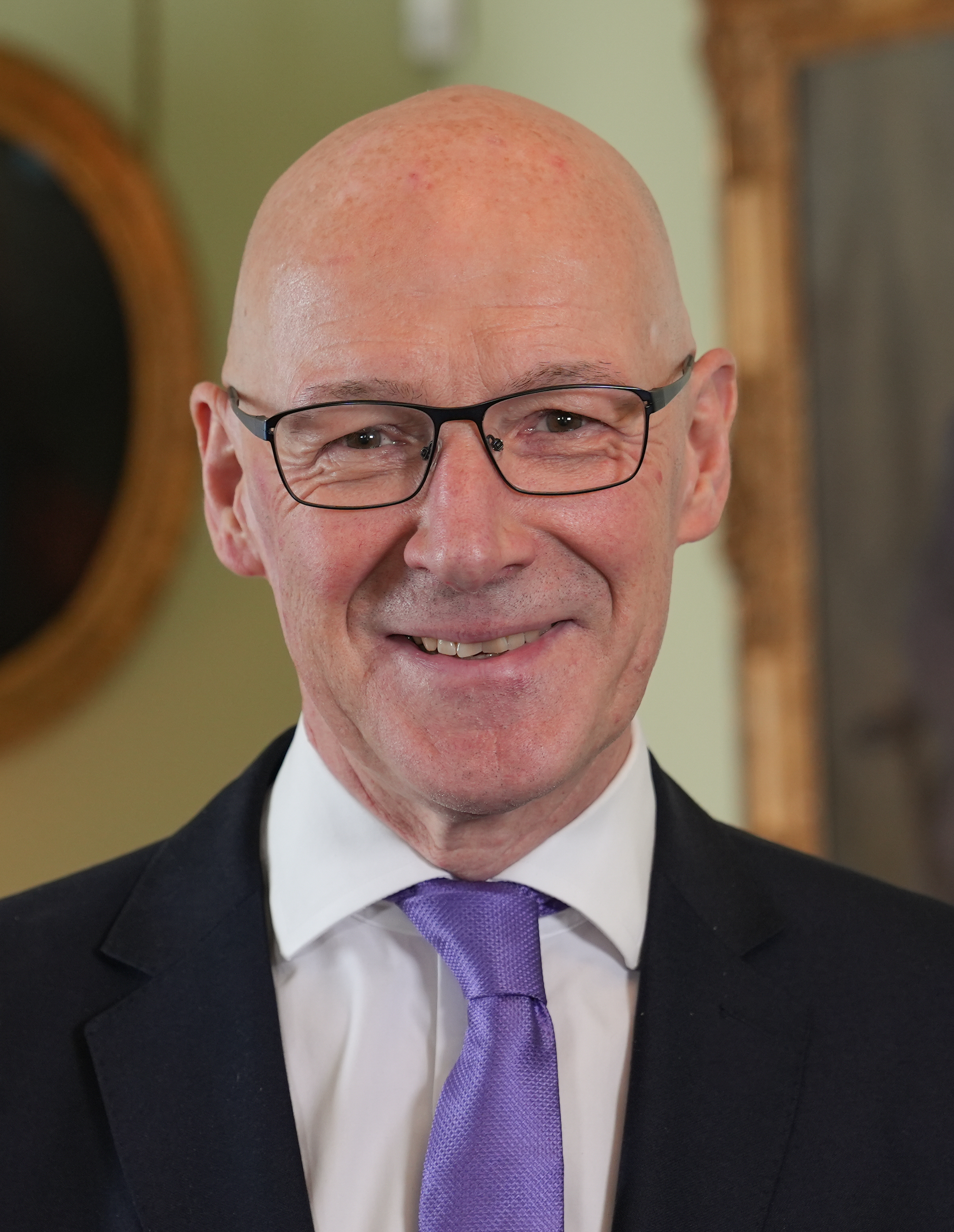
John Swinney, Scotland's current first minister, attended Forrester High School in Edinburgh and studied politics at the University of Edinburgh

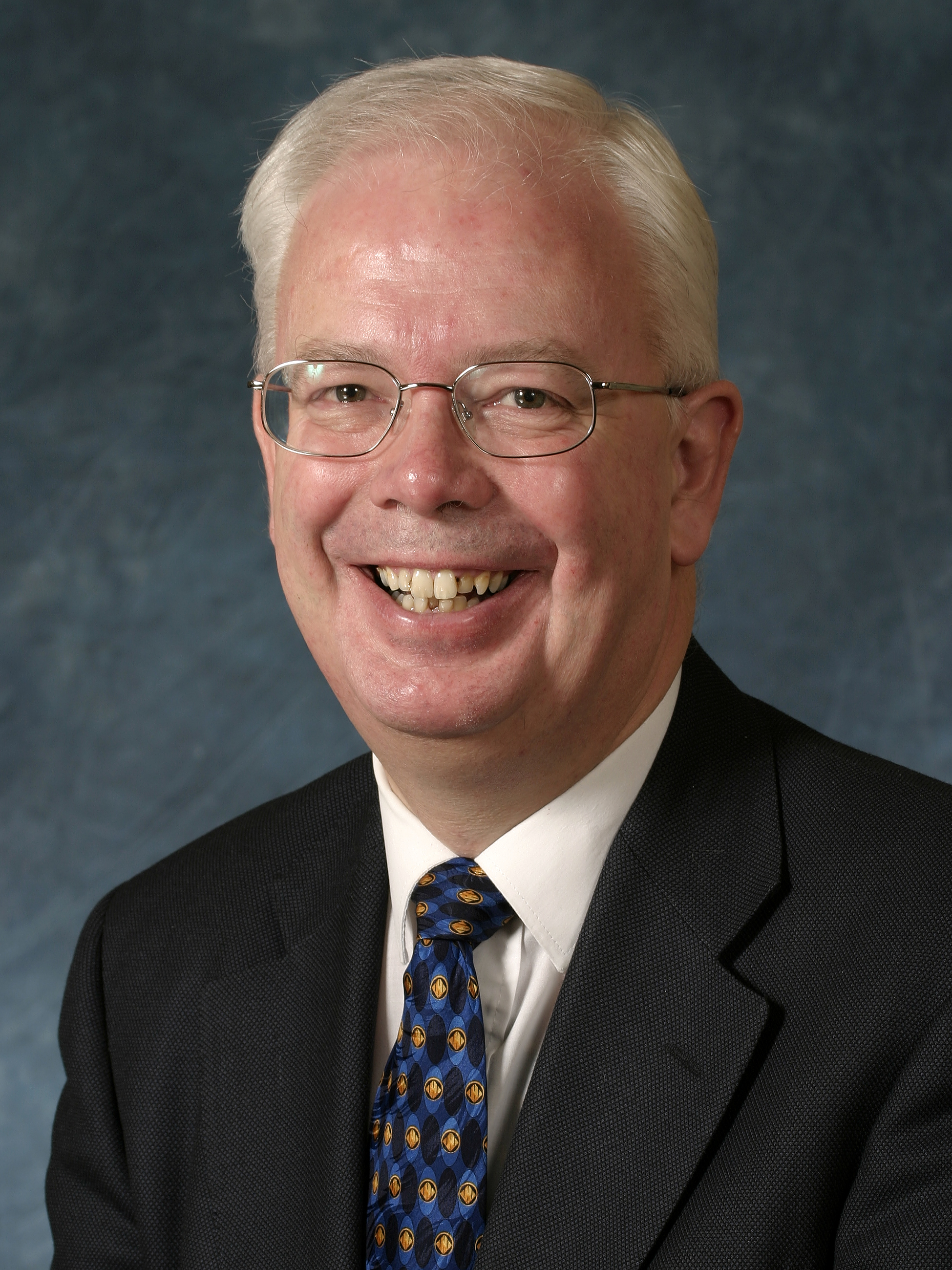
Jim Wallace is the only Scottish first minister to have attended a university in England, the University of Cambridge

== List of Scottish first ministers by education ==
First Minister	Term of office	School	University	Degree	Professional training
Donald Dewar	1999–2000	The Glasgow Academy	University of Glasgow	History; 1958–1961, M.A. Law; 1961–1964, LL.B.	
Jim Wallace	2000 2001	Annan Academy	Cambridge (Downing Coll.)	Economics & Law; 1972–1975, B.A.	
Jim Wallace	2000 2001	Annan Academy	University of Edinburgh	Scots Law; 1975–1977, LL.B.	
Henry McLeish	2000–2001	Buckhaven High School	Heriot-Watt University	Town Planning; 1968–1973, B.Sc. (Hons)	
Jack McConnell	2001–2007	Arran High School	University of Stirling	Mathematics & Education; 1980–1983, B.Sc. Dip.Ed.	
Alex Salmond	2007–2014	Linlithgow Academy	Edinburgh College of Commerce	Business Studies; 1972–1973, HNC	
Alex Salmond	2007–2014	Linlithgow Academy	University of St Andrews	Economics & Medieval History; 1975–1978, M.A.	
Nicola Sturgeon	2014–2023	Greenwood Academy	University of Glasgow	Law; 1989–1993, LL.B. 1992, DLP 1993	
Humza Yousaf	2023–2024	Hutchesons' Grammar School	University of Glasgow	Politics; 2004–2007, M.A.	
John Swinney	2024	Forrester High School	University of Edinburgh	Politics; 1983–1986, M.A.	
First Minister	Term of office	School	University	Degree	Professional training

== See also ==
- List of prime ministers of the United Kingdom by education
- List of prime ministers of Australia by education
- List of prime ministers of Canada by academic degrees
- List of presidents of the Philippines by education
