= List of prime ministers of New Zealand by education =

The following is a list of prime ministers of New Zealand by education. The list includes all recognised heads of government, the title of which has included colonial secretary, premier, first minister and prime minister, since the establishment of a responsible government in New Zealand in 1856. James FitzGerald and Thomas Forsaith, who led unofficial ministries in 1854, are not included.

Historically it was not uncommon for New Zealand prime ministers to have little tertiary education, however university attendance has become more common since the 1970s. The most frequently attended university is Victoria University of Wellington with four alumni (Jack Marshall, Geoffrey Palmer, Bill English and Chris Hipkins) having held the office of prime minister, followed by the University of Canterbury with three alumni. However, if Jenny Shipley, who attended the Christchurch Teachers' College, now part of the University of Canterbury, is included, the total rises to four. The universities of Auckland, Cambridge, and Otago follow two alumni each. Only two prime ministers have held doctoral level education (Daniel Pollen and Geoffrey Palmer).

== List of New Zealand prime ministers by education ==
Prime Minister	Term(s) of office	Secondary School	University	Professional training
Henry Sewell	1856	Hyde Abbey School		
William Fox	1856; 1861–1862; 1869–1872; 1873	Durham School	Wadham College, Oxford (MA (Note: Master of Arts by seniority))	Inns of Court: Inner Temple
Edward Stafford	1856–1861; 1865–1869; 1872	Royal School Dungannon	Trinity College Dublin (no degree)	
Alfred Domett	1862–1863	Stockwell Park House	St John's College, Cambridge (no degree)	Inns of Court: Middle Temple
Frederick Whitaker	1863–1864; 1882–1883	unknown (Note: Details of Whitaker's education are unclear)		
Frederick Weld	1864–1865	Stonyhurst College	University of Fribourg	
George Waterhouse	1872–1873	Kingswood School		
Julius Vogel	1873–1875; 1876	University College School		Royal School of Mines
Daniel Pollen	1875–1876	unknown (Note: Little is known of Pollen's early life, but he likely received secondary education before his medical studies)	unknown (MD) (Note: Pollen claimed to have a MD, although it is not known where he studied)	
Harry Atkinson	1876–1877; 1883–1884; 1884; 1887–1891			
George Grey	1877–1879	Royal Grammar School		Royal Military College, Sandhurst
John Hall	1879–1882	unknown (Note: Between the ages of 10 and 16, Hall attended schools in St. Gallen, Paris and Hamburg)		
Robert Stout	1884; 1884–1887	Lerwick Academy	University of Otago (no degree)	
John Ballance	1891–1893	Wilson's Academy		Birmingham and Midland Institute
Richard Seddon	1893–1906	Eccleston Hill Grammar School		
William Hall-Jones	1906			
Joseph Ward	1906–1912; 1928–1930			
Thomas Mackenzie	1912	North Dunedin District School		
William Massey	1912–1925	unknown (Note: Massey attended a "private secondary school" in Derry)		
Francis Bell	1925	Auckland Grammar School; Otago Boys' High School	St John's College, Cambridge (MA, mathematics)	
Gordon Coates	1925–1928			
George Forbes	1930–1935	Christchurch Boys' High School		
Michael Joseph Savage	1935–1940			
Peter Fraser	1940–1949			
Sidney Holland	1949–1957	Christchurch West District High School		
Keith Holyoake	1957; 1960–1972			
Walter Nash	1957–1960	King Charles I Grammar School		
Jack Marshall	1972	Otago Boys' High School; Whangarei Boys' High School	Victoria University College (LLB, LLM)	
Norman Kirk	1972–1974			
Bill Rowling	1974–1975	Nelson College	Canterbury University College (BA, economics)	Christchurch College of Education
Robert Muldoon	1975–1984	Mount Albert Grammar School		
David Lange	1984–1989	Otahuhu College	University of Auckland (LLB, LLM)	
Geoffrey Palmer	1989–1990	Nelson College	Victoria University of Wellington (BA, political science; LLB); University of Chicago Law School (JD)	
Mike Moore	1990	Bay of Islands College; Dilworth School		
Jim Bolger	1990–1997	Opunake High School		
Jenny Shipley	1997–1999	Marlborough Girls' College		Christchurch College of Education
Helen Clark	1999–2008	Epsom Girls' Grammar School	University of Auckland (BA, MA (Hons), political studies)	
John Key	2008–2016	Burnside High School	University of Canterbury (BCom, accounting); Harvard University (no degree, management)	
Bill English	2016–2017	St Patrick's College, Silverstream	University of Otago (BA, BCom); Victoria University of Wellington (BA (Hons), English literature)	
Jacinda Ardern	2017–2023	Morrinsville College	University of Waikato (BCS, public relations and political science)	
Chris Hipkins	2023	Hutt Valley Memorial College	Victoria University of Wellington (BA, politics and criminology)	
Christopher Luxon	2023–present	Saint Kentigern College; Howick College; Christchurch Boys' High School	University of Canterbury (BCom, MCom, business administration)	

== See also ==
- List of prime ministers of Australia by education
- List of prime ministers of Canada by academic degrees
- List of prime ministers of the United Kingdom by education
- List of presidents of the United States by education
