= List of prime ministers of Australia by education =

Universities attended by Australian prime ministers
University	Number of prime ministers
University of Sydney	8
University of Oxford	6
University of Melbourne	4
Australian National University	2
Other university	4
No university	13

A bar chart of universities attended by Australian prime ministers

The prime ministers of Australia have attended a variety of different educational institutions.

Until relatively recently, it was uncommon for prime ministers in Australia to hold a university degree. Out of the first ten prime ministers, only three attended university and only two held degrees. However, nine out of the most recent ten prime ministers have been university graduates. The University of Sydney (eight), the University of Oxford (six), and the University of Melbourne (four) have been the most frequently attended institutions. The vast majority of degrees awarded to future prime ministers were in either arts or law. Only Edmund Barton, Earle Page, and Robert Menzies undertook postgraduate studies that resulted in a substantive master's degree. Six others undertook postgraduate studies in the form of a second bachelor's degree, including four who did so at Oxford University and proceeded to a Master of Arts by seniority. No prime minister has held a substantive doctorate, although Earle Page was a medical doctor. Bob Hawke dropped out of a Ph.D. program.

Many of Australia's early prime ministers had limited formal education and left school at a young age to seek employment. Chris Watson, Andrew Fisher, and Joseph Cook all finished their formal schooling before the age of 13. John McEwen is the most recent prime minister to have had no secondary schooling, while Paul Keating is the most recent to have had no university education. Four early prime ministers were educated entirely outside of Australia – one in New Zealand and three in Great Britain. There has been a relatively even mixture of private schools and government schools, and many prime ministers alternated between the two systems. Only a handful of schools have hosted more than one future prime minister – Melbourne Grammar School (three), Sydney Grammar School (three), Wesley College, Melbourne (two), Abbotsholme College (two) and Sydney Boys High School (two).

== List ==
- Note: the University of Oxford awards a Master of Arts by seniority, which is indicated with an asterisk.

Prime Minister	Term(s)	Schooling (most recent first)	University
Edmund Barton	1901–1903	Sydney Grammar School; Fort Street Model School (Sydney)	University of Sydney (B.A., M.A.)
Alfred Deakin	1903–1904; 1905–1908; 1909–1910	Melbourne Grammar School; Ladies' College (Kyneton, Vic.)	University of Melbourne (law, no degree)
Chris Watson	1904	Weston School (Weston, NZ)	–
George Reid	1904–1905	Melbourne Academy	–
Andrew Fisher	1908–1909; 1910–1913; 1914–1915	Crosshouse Public School (Crosshouse, Scot.)	–
Joseph Cook	1913–1914	St Luke's Church of England School (Silverdale, Eng.)	–
Billy Hughes	1915–1923	St Stephen's School (Westminster, Eng.); Dr Roberts's School (Llandudno, Wales); McLaughlan's School (Llandudno, Wales)	–
Stanley Bruce	1923–1929	Melbourne Grammar School	Trinity Hall, Cambridge (B.A.)
James Scullin	1929–1932	Mount Rowan State School (Ballarat, Vic.); Trawalla State School (Trawalla, Vic.)	–
Joseph Lyons	1932–1939	Stanley State School (Stanley, Tas.); St Joseph's Convent School (Ulverstone, Tas.); Ulverstone State School (Ulverstone, Tas.)	–
Earle Page	1939	Sydney Boys High School; Grafton Public School (Grafton, NSW)	University of Sydney (M.B., Ch.M.)
Robert Menzies	1939–1941; 1949–1966	Wesley College (Melbourne); Grenville College (Ballarat, Vic.); Humffray Street State School (Ballarat, Vic.); Jeparit State School (Jeparit, Vic.)	University of Melbourne (LL.B. (Hons), LL.M.)
Arthur Fadden	1941	Te Kowai State School (Te Kowai, Qld.); Walkerston State School (Walkerston, Qld.)	–
John Curtin	1941–1945	Macedon State School (Macedon, Vic.); St Francis's Boys' School (Melbourne); Charlton State School (Charlton, Vic.)	–
Frank Forde	1945	St Mary's College (Toowoomba, Qld.); Mitchell State School (Mitchell, Qld.)	–
Ben Chifley	1945–1949	Patrician Brothers' School (Bathurst, NSW); Limekilns Public School (Limekilns, NSW)	–
Harold Holt	1966–1967	Wesley College (Melbourne); Abbotsholme College (Sydney); Nubba State School (Nubba, NSW); Randwick Public School (Sydney)	University of Melbourne (LL.B.)
John McEwen	1967–1968	Wangaratta State School (Wangaratta, Vic.)	–
John Gorton	1968–1971	Geelong Grammar School (Geelong, Vic.); Sydney Church of England Grammar School; Headfort College (Sydney); Edgecliff Preparatory School (Sydney)	Brasenose College, Oxford (M.A.*)
William McMahon	1971–1972	Sydney Grammar School; Abbotsholme College (Sydney)	University of Sydney (LL.B., B.Ec.)
Gough Whitlam	1972–1975	Canberra Grammar School; Knox Grammar School (Sydney); Mowbray House School (Sydney); Chatswood Church of England Girls' School (Sydney)	University of Sydney (B.A. (Hons), LL.B.)
Malcolm Fraser	1975–1983	Melbourne Grammar School; Tudor House School (Moss Vale, NSW)	Magdalen College, Oxford (M.A. (Hons)*)
Bob Hawke	1983–1991	Perth Modern School; Maitland Primary School (Maitland, SA)	University of Western Australia (B.A., LL.B.); University College, Oxford (B.Litt.); Australian National University (law, no degree)
Paul Keating	1991–1996	De La Salle College (Sydney); Belmore Technical College (Sydney)	–
John Howard	1996–2007	Canterbury Boys' High School (Sydney); Earlwood Primary School (Sydney)	University of Sydney (LL.B.)
Kevin Rudd	2007–2010; 2013	Nambour State High School (Nambour, Qld.); Marist College Ashgrove (Brisbane); Eumundi State School (Eumundi, Qld.)	Australian National University (B.A. (Hons)); Jesus College, Oxford (PhD.)
Julia Gillard	2010–2013	Unley High School (Adelaide); Mitcham Primary School (Adelaide)	University of Adelaide (arts, no degree); University of Melbourne (LL.B., B.A.)
Tony Abbott	2013–2015	Saint Ignatius' College Riverview (Sydney); St Aloysius' College (Sydney)	University of Sydney (B.Ec., LL.B.); The Queen's College, Oxford (M.A.*)
Malcolm Turnbull	2015–2018	Sydney Grammar School; Vaucluse Public School (Sydney)	University of Sydney (B.A., LL.B.); Brasenose College, Oxford (B.C.L. (Hons))
Scott Morrison	2018–2022	Sydney Boys High School; Bronte Public School (Sydney)	University of New South Wales (B.Sc. (Hons))
Anthony Albanese	2022–present	St Joseph's Primary School (Sydney); St Mary's Cathedral College (Sydney)	University of Sydney (B.Ec.)

== See also ==
- List of presidents of the United States by education
- List of prime ministers of Canada by academic degrees
- List of prime ministers of New Zealand by education
- List of presidents of the Philippines by education
- List of prime ministers of the United Kingdom by education
