= List of presidents of the Philippines by education =

This is a complete list of Philippine presidents by college education that consists of the 17 heads of state in the history of the Philippines.

Almost all presidents (except Emilio Aguinaldo, Joseph Estrada, and Bongbong Marcos) completed a college degree program. College and postgraduate education have prepared presidents in their future roles as heads of state, architects of foreign policy, commanders-in-chief of the Armed Forces of the Philippines, and managers of the entire government bureaucracy.

By law, under the Constitution of the Philippines, any Filipino citizen aged forty and above who can read and write and can meet residency requirements is eligible to run as president. However, in practice, popularity, political machinery, and financial resources are the key elements leading to a successful presidential candidate.

== List by degree ==
This section lists presidents according to schools from which they earned degrees. Schools that presidents attended but did not earn degrees from are not included.

=== Did not graduate from college ===
- Emilio Aguinaldo (A cholera epidemic forced the Colegio de San Juan de Letran where Aguinaldo attended the equivalent of high school to close in 1880. Aguinaldo never returned to any form of schooling following this closure.)
- Joseph Estrada (Estrada attended Mapúa Institute of Technology before transferring to Polytechnic Colleges of the Philippines, where he later dropped out.)
- Bongbong Marcos (Marcos attended the Center for Research and Communication, where he took a special diploma course in economics, but did not finish. He also attended St Edmund Hall at the University of Oxford, studying philosophy, politics and economics (PPE). However, despite his claims that he graduated with a bachelor of arts in PPE, he did not obtain such a degree. Marcos had passed philosophy, but failed economics, and failed politics twice, thus making him ineligible for a degree. Instead, he received a special diploma in social studies, which was awarded mainly to non-graduates and is currently no longer offered by the university.)

=== LL.B. ===
The J.D. was first conferred in the Philippines in lieu of the LL.B. by the Ateneo Law School in 1990, with the model program later adopted by most schools now offering the J.D. However, no president as of yet has graduated with the J.D., as all have earned the LL.B. prior to 1990.

School	Location	President(s)
Philippine Law School	Pasay, Metro Manila (Note: Although Garcia and Macapagal attended the original campus of the Philippine Law School in Manila, the school has since relocated to Pasay in 1958.)	Carlos P. Garcia
San Beda College of Law	Manila, Metro Manila	Rodrigo Duterte
University of Santo Tomas Faculty of Civil Law	Manila, Metro Manila	Manuel L. Quezon; Sergio Osmeña; Diosdado Macapagal
University of the Philippines College of Law	Quezon City, Metro Manila (Note: The University of the Philippines was not declared as a university system before 1972. Although the respective colleges attended by Laurel, Roxas, Quirino, and Marcos Sr. now belong to University of the Philippines Diliman, they attended the original campus, which is now University of the Philippines Manila. The University of the Philippines College of Law itself has been located in the Diliman campus in Quezon City since 1948.)	José P. Laurel; Manuel Roxas; Elpidio Quirino; Ferdinand Marcos

=== Master's ===
School	Location	President(s)
Ateneo de Manila University	Makati, Metro Manila	Fidel Ramos
Ateneo de Manila University	Quezon City, Metro Manila	Gloria Macapagal Arroyo
Escuela de Derecho de Manila	Manila, Metro Manila	José P. Laurel
National Defense College of the Philippines	Quezon City, Metro Manila	Fidel Ramos
University of Illinois	Urbana, United States	Fidel Ramos
University of Santo Tomas	Manila, Metro Manila	Diosdado Macapagal

=== Ph.D. ===
School	Location	President(s)
University of Santo Tomas	Manila, Metro Manila	José P. Laurel; Diosdado Macapagal
University of the Philippines Diliman	Quezon City, Metro Manila	Gloria Macapagal Arroyo
Yale University	New Haven, United States	José P. Laurel

=== Undergraduate ===
Some presidents attended more than one institution, though only those from which they earned undergraduate degrees are included here. Two presidents never earned undergraduate degrees: Emilio Aguinaldo never attended college, while Joseph Estrada dropped out from both colleges that he attended. One, Bongbong Marcos, did not finish his special diploma course at the Center for Research and Communication and received only a special diploma in social studies from the University of Oxford as he failed two components of his program of study, making him ineligible to receive an undergraduate degree. Marcos still falsely claims that he obtained a degree from Oxford despite Oxford confirming in 2015 and 2021 that Marcos did not finish his degree.

Three presidents attended foreign colleges at the undergraduate level: Corazon Aquino, Fidel Ramos, and Bongbong Marcos. One president attended a United States service academy: Fidel Ramos graduated from the United States Military Academy as part of his professional education as a career soldier.

School	Location	President(s)
Assumption College San Lorenzo	Makati, Metro Manila	Gloria Macapagal Arroyo
Ateneo de Manila University	Quezon City, Metro Manila	Benigno Aquino III
Colegio de San Juan de Letran	Manila, Metro Manila	Manuel L. Quezon; Sergio Osmeña
College of Mount Saint Vincent	New York City, United States	Corazon Aquino
José Rizal College	Mandaluyong, Metro Manila (Note: Although Magsaysay attended the original campus of José Rizal College in Manila, the school has since relocated to Mandaluyong in 1949.)	Ramon Magsaysay
Lyceum of the Philippines	Manila, Metro Manila	Rodrigo Duterte
National University	Pasay, Metro Manila	Carlos P. Garcia
United States Military Academy	West Point, United States	Fidel Ramos
University of Santo Tomas	Manila, Metro Manila	Diosdado Macapagal
University of the Philippines	Quezon City, Metro Manila	José P. Laurel; Manuel Roxas; Elpidio Quirino; Ferdinand Marcos

== List by specialization ==
=== Business school ===
School	Location	President(s)
Ateneo Graduate School of Business	Makati, Metro Manila	Fidel Ramos (MBA)
Wharton School of the University of Pennsylvania	Philadelphia, United States	Bongbong Marcos (withdrew)

=== Law school ===
School	Location	President(s)
Escuela de Derecho de Manila	Manila, Metro Manila	José P. Laurel (LL.M)
Far Eastern University Institute of Law	Manila, Metro Manila	Corazon Aquino (withdrew)
Philippine Law School	Pasay, Metro Manila	Carlos P. Garcia (LL.B); Diosdado Macapagal (transferred to University of Santo Tomas Faculty of Civil Law)
San Beda College of Law	Manila, Metro Manila	Rodrigo Duterte (LL.B)
Silliman University College of Law	Dumaguete, Negros Oriental	Carlos P. Garcia (transferred to Philippine Law School)
University of Santo Tomas Faculty of Civil Law	Manila, Metro Manila	Manuel L. Quezon (LL.B); Sergio Osmeña (LL.B); Diosdado Macapagal (LL.B, LL.M, DCL)
University of the Philippines College of Law	Quezon City, Metro Manila	José P. Laurel (LL.B); Manuel Roxas (LL.B); Elpidio Quirino (LL.B); Ferdinand Marcos (LL.B)
Yale Law School	New Haven, United States	José P. Laurel (DCL)

== List by presidents ==
President	High school or equivalent	Undergraduate school	Graduate school
Emilio Aguinaldo	Colegio de San Juan de Letran (did not finish)	none	none
Manuel L. Quezon	Colegio de San Juan de Letran	Colegio de San Juan de Letran (AB)	University of Santo Tomas Faculty of Civil Law (LL.B)
José P. Laurel	Manila High School	University of the Philippines College of Law (LL.B)	Escuela de Derecho de Manila (LL.M); Yale Law School (DCL); University of Santo Tomas (PhD)
Sergio Osmeña	Colegio-Seminario de San Carlos	Colegio de San Juan de Letran (AB)	University of Santo Tomas Faculty of Civil Law (LL.B)
Manuel Roxas	Manila High School	University of the Philippines College of Law (LL.B)	
Elpidio Quirino	Manila High School	University of the Philippines College of Law (LL.B)	
Ramon Magsaysay	Zambales Academy	University of the Philippines (transferred); José Rizal College (AB)	none
Carlos P. Garcia	Cebu Provincial High School	Silliman University College of Law (transferred); Philippine Law School (LL.B)	
Diosdado Macapagal	Pampanga High School	Philippine Law School (transferred); University of Santo Tomas Faculty of Civil Law (LL.B)	University of Santo Tomas Faculty of Civil Law (LL.M, DCL); University of Santo Tomas (PhD)
Ferdinand Marcos	University of the Philippines	University of the Philippines College of Law (LL.B)	
Corazon Aquino	Assumption Convent (transferred); Ravenhill Academy (transferred); Notre Dame Convent School	College of Mount Saint Vincent (AB)	Far Eastern University Institute of Law (withdrew)
Fidel Ramos	University of the Philippines (transferred); Mapúa Institute of Technology (transferred); Centro Escolar de Señoritas	United States Military Academy (AB)	University of Illinois (M.Eng); National Defense College of the Philippines (MNSA); Ateneo Graduate School of Business (MBA)
Joseph Estrada	Ateneo de Manila University (did not finish)	Mapúa Institute of Technology (transferred); Polytechnic Colleges of the Philippines (withdrew)	none
Gloria Macapagal Arroyo	Assumption Convent	Georgetown University (transferred); Assumption College San Lorenzo (AB)	Ateneo de Manila University (MA); University of the Philippines Diliman (PhD)
Benigno Aquino III	Ateneo de Manila University	Ateneo de Manila University (AB)	none
Rodrigo Duterte	Ateneo de Davao University (did not finish); Holy Cross Academy of Digos	Lyceum of the Philippines (AB)	San Beda College of Law (LL.B)
Bongbong Marcos	Worth School	Center for Research and Communication (did not finish); University of Oxford (special diploma) (Note: Marcos Jr. has regularly misrepresented his education at the University of Oxford, claiming that he graduated with a bachelor of arts in philosophy, politics and economics. However, he did not obtain such a degree, instead receiving a special diploma in social studies, which was awarded mainly to non-graduates and is currently no longer offered by the university.)	Wharton School of the University of Pennsylvania (withdrew)

== Other academic associations ==
=== Faculty member ===
President(s)	School	Position	Years
José P. Laurel	University of the Philippines College of Law	Professor of Law	N/A
José P. Laurel	Philippine Law School	Professor of Law	N/A
José P. Laurel	University of Santo Tomas Faculty of Civil Law	Professor of Law	N/A
José P. Laurel	University of Manila	Professor of Law	N/A
José P. Laurel	Far Eastern University Institute of Law	Professor of Law	N/A
José P. Laurel	Central University	Professor of Law	N/A
José P. Laurel	Adamson University College of Law	Professor of Law	N/A
Manuel Roxas	Philippine Law School	Professor of Law	1916
Elpidio Quirino	Adamson University College of Law	Dean	1941–1946
Carlos P. Garcia	Bohol Provincial High School	Teacher	1923
Diosdado Macapagal	University of Santo Tomas Faculty of Civil Law	Professor of Law	1941–1957
Diosdado Macapagal	San Beda College of Law	Professor of Law	1948
Gloria Macapagal Arroyo	Assumption College San Lorenzo	Professor of Economics	1977–1987
Gloria Macapagal Arroyo	Ateneo de Manila University	Assistant Professor	1977–1987
Gloria Macapagal Arroyo	University of the Philippines Diliman	Senior Lecturer	1977–1987

=== School rector or president ===
President(s)	School	Position	Years
José P. Laurel	Lyceum of the Philippines	Founder/President	1952–1959

=== School trustee or governor ===
President(s)	School	Position	Years
José P. Laurel	Lyceum of the Philippines	Chairman, Board of Trustees	1952–1959
José P. Laurel	National Teachers College	Chancellor	1928–1952

== See also ==
- Education in the Philippines
- List of prime ministers of Australia by education
- List of prime ministers of New Zealand by education
- List of prime ministers of Canada by academic degrees
- List of prime ministers of the United Kingdom by education
- List of presidents of the United States by education
