= Marjorie Ritchie =

Scottish animal scientist (1948–2015)

- Born: Marjorie Fordyce; 29 March 1948; Edinburgh, Scotland
- Died: 25 March 2015 (aged 66)
- Occupation: Animal scientist
- Years active: 1966-2014
- Employer(s): Roslin Institute, University of Edinburgh
- Known for: work on Dolly The Sheep
- Spouse: Bill Ritchie
- Parents: James Fordyce (father); Helen Fordyce (mother)

Marjorie Ritchie (29 March 1948 – 25 March 2015) was a Scottish animal researcher and animal surgeon known for her contribution as part of the pioneering team who cloned Dolly The Sheep.

== Early life and education ==
Ritchie was born in Edinburgh, Scotland on 29 March 1948 to Helen and James Fordyce. She had two brothers, Ronald and Forbes. She attended Corstorphine Primary, Granville School for Girls and Forrester High School.

She became interested in animals through visiting a relative who worked in animal breeding research at the Roslin Institute.

== Career ==
In 1966, at the age of 18, Ritchie joined the Animal Breed Research Organisation, the predecessor of the Roslin Institute. She worked initially undertaking research into fibre types in the organisation's wool laboratory.

She later joined the Farm Animal Department, becoming the senior scientific officer in charge of the Large Animal Unit.

Ritchie is recognised as being an important influence on young scientists and technicians working in or studying animal science.

She retired in 2014 after 48 years of service.

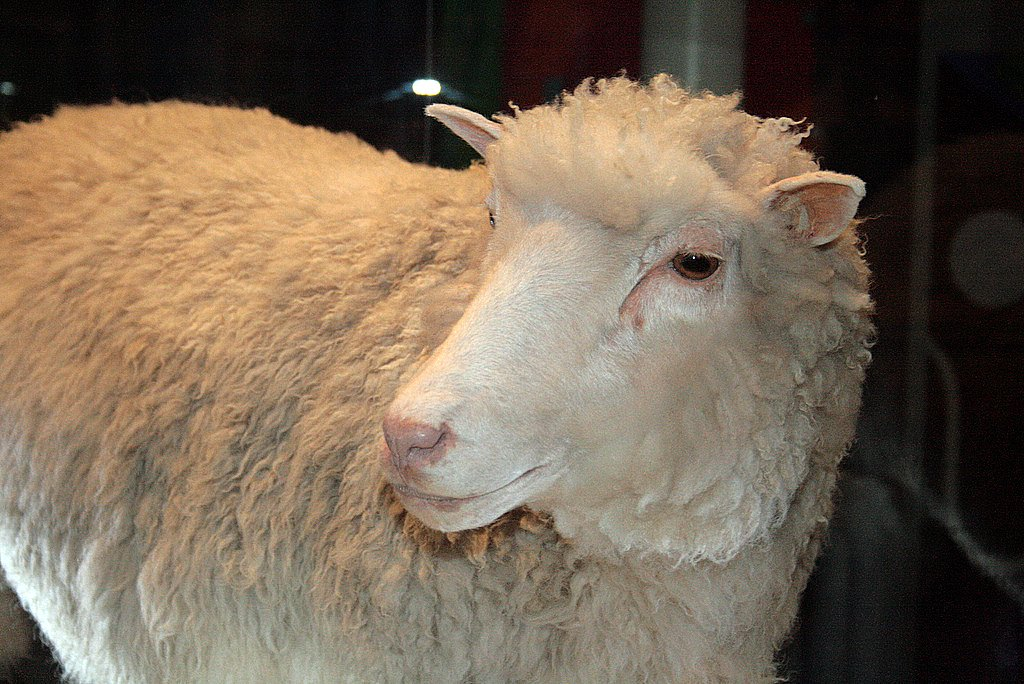
Dolly the Sheep

Ritchie appeared on the BBC Sounds The Reunion radio programme in 2012 along with colleagues talking about the impact of Dolly the Sheep 15 years later.

== Personal life ==
In 1988, she married Bill Ritchie who also worked as part of the 'Dolly Team', as an anaesthetist and embryologist.

Ritchie has been commemorated in a photograph by Scottish artist Wendy McMurdo alongside anaesthetist John Bracken at the Scottish National Portrait Gallery.
