= List of vice presidents of the United States by education =

Most vice presidents of the United States have undergone higher education at an American university, college or law school.

== List ==
No.	Image	Name	Home state	Took office	Left office	Party	School	President(s)	Ref
1	John Adams	John Adams	Massachusetts	April 21, 1789	March 4, 1797	Federalist	Harvard College	George Washington	
2	Thomas Jefferson	Thomas Jefferson	Virginia	March 4, 1797	March 4, 1801	Democratic-Republican	College of William & Mary	John Adams	
3	Aaron Burr	Aaron Burr	New York	March 4, 1801	March 4, 1805	Democratic-Republican	Princeton	Jefferson	
4	George Clinton	George Clinton	New York	March 4, 1805	April 20, 1812	Democratic-Republican	Studied law with William Smith	Jefferson/ Madison	
		Vacant		April 20, 1812	March 4, 1813			Madison	
5	Elbridge Gerry	Elbridge Gerry	Massachusetts	March 4, 1813	November 23, 1814	Democratic-Republican	Harvard College	Madison	
		Vacant		November 23, 1814	March 4, 1817			Madison	
6	Daniel Tompkins	Daniel D. Tompkins	New York	March 4, 1817	March 4, 1825	Democratic-Republican	Columbia	Monroe	
7	John C. Calhoun	John C. Calhoun	South Carolina	March 4, 1825	December 28, 1832	Democratic-Republican/ Democratic	Yale College	J. Q. Adams/ Jackson	
		Vacant		December 28, 1832	March 4, 1833			Jackson	
8	Martin Van Buren	Martin Van Buren	New York	March 4, 1833	March 4, 1837	Democratic	Kinderhook Academy and Washington Seminary; studied law with Peter Silvester, Francis Sylvester and William P. Van Ness	Jackson	
9	Richard Mentor Johnson	Richard Mentor Johnson	Kentucky	March 4, 1837	March 4, 1841	Democratic	Transylvania University	Van Buren	
10	John Tyler	John Tyler	Virginia	March 4, 1841	April 4, 1841	Whig	College of William & Mary	W. Harrison	
		Vacant		April 4, 1841	March 4, 1845			Tyler	
11	George M. Dallas	George M. Dallas	Pennsylvania	March 4, 1845	March 4, 1849	Democratic	Princeton University	Polk	
12	Millard Fillmore	Millard Fillmore	New York	March 4, 1849	July 9, 1850	Whig	New Hope Academy, studied law with Judge Walter Wood, Cayuga County, New York	Taylor	
		Vacant		July 9, 1850	March 4, 1853			Fillmore	
13	William R. King	William R. King	Alabama	March 4, 1853	April 18, 1853	Democratic	University of North Carolina	Pierce	
		Vacant		April 18, 1853	March 4, 1857			Pierce	
14	John C. Breckinridge	John C. Breckinridge	Kentucky	March 4, 1857	March 4, 1861	Democratic	Centre College, Princeton University, Transylvania University	Buchanan	
15	Hannibal Hamlin	Hannibal Hamlin	Maine	March 4, 1861	March 4, 1865	Republican	Hebron Academy; studied law at the firm of Samuel Fessenden	Lincoln	
16	Andrew Johnson	Andrew Johnson	Tennessee	March 4, 1865	April 15, 1865	Democratic	None (Self-taught and received instruction from his wife, Eliza McCardle Johnson)	Lincoln	
		Vacant		April 15, 1865	March 4, 1869			A. Johnson	
17	Schuyler Colfax	Schuyler Colfax	Indiana	March 4, 1869	March 4, 1873	Republican	Common schools of New York City and New Carlisle, Indiana	Grant	
18	Henry Wilson	Henry Wilson	Massachusetts	March 4, 1873	November 22, 1875	Republican	Academies in Strafford, Wolfeboro, and Concord, New Hampshire	Grant	
		Vacant		November 22, 1875	March 4, 1877			Grant	
19	William A. Wheeler	William A. Wheeler	New York	March 4, 1877	March 4, 1881	Republican	University of Vermont	Hayes	
20	Chester A. Arthur	Chester A. Arthur	New York	March 4, 1881	September 19, 1881	Republican	Union College, State and National Law School	Garfield	
		Vacant		September 19, 1881	March 4, 1885			Arthur	
21	Thomas Hendricks	Thomas A. Hendricks	Indiana	March 4, 1885	November 25, 1885	Democratic	Hanover College	Cleveland	
		Vacant		November 25, 1885	March 4, 1889			Cleveland	
22	Levi Morton	Levi P. Morton	New York	March 4, 1889	March 4, 1893	Republican	Shoreham Academy, Shoreham, Vermont	B. Harrison	
23	Adlai E. Stevenson	Adlai E. Stevenson	Illinois	March 4, 1893	March 4, 1897	Democratic	Illinois Wesleyan University, Centre College	Cleveland	
24	Garret Hobart	Garret Hobart	New Jersey	March 4, 1897	November 21, 1899	Republican	Rutgers College	McKinley	
		Vacant		November 21, 1899	March 4, 1901			McKinley	
25	Theodore Roosevelt	Theodore Roosevelt	New York	March 4, 1901	September 14, 1901	Republican	Harvard College, Columbia Law School (did not graduate)	McKinley	
		Vacant		September 14, 1901	March 4, 1905			T. Roosevelt	
26	Charles W. Fairbanks	Charles W. Fairbanks	Indiana	March 4, 1905	March 4, 1909	Republican	Ohio Wesleyan University	T. Roosevelt	
27	James S. Sherman	James S. Sherman	New York	March 4, 1909	October 30, 1912	Republican	Hamilton College	Taft	
		Vacant		October 30, 1912	March 4, 1913			Taft	
28	Thomas R. Marshall	Thomas R. Marshall	Indiana	March 4, 1913	March 4, 1921	Democratic	Wabash College	Wilson	
29	Calvin Coolidge	Calvin Coolidge	Massachusetts	March 4, 1921	August 2, 1923	Republican	Amherst College	Harding	
		Vacant		August 2, 1923	March 4, 1925			Coolidge	
30	Charles G. Dawes	Charles G. Dawes	Illinois	March 4, 1925	March 4, 1929	Republican	Marietta College, University of Cincinnati College of Law	Coolidge	
31	Charles Curtis	Charles Curtis	Kansas	March 4, 1929	March 4, 1933	Republican	Topeka High School, studied law with Aderial H. Case	Hoover	
32	John Nance Garner	John Nance Garner	Texas	March 4, 1933	January 20, 1941	Democratic	Vanderbilt University	F. Roosevelt	
33	Henry A. Wallace	Henry A. Wallace	Iowa	January 20, 1941	January 20, 1945	Democratic	Iowa State University	F. Roosevelt	
34	Harry S. Truman	Harry S. Truman	Missouri	January 20, 1945	April 12, 1945	Democratic	Spalding's Commercial College (did not graduate); Kansas City Law School (did not graduate)	F. Roosevelt	
		Vacant		April 12, 1945	January 20, 1949			Truman	
35	Alben W. Barkley	Alben W. Barkley	Kentucky	January 20, 1949	January 20, 1953	Democratic	Marvin College, Emory University, University of Virginia School of Law	Truman	
36	Richard Nixon	Richard Nixon	California	January 20, 1953	January 20, 1961	Republican	Whittier College, Duke University School of Law	Eisenhower	
37	Lyndon B. Johnson	Lyndon B. Johnson	Texas	January 20, 1961	November 22, 1963	Democratic	Southwest Texas State Teachers College, Georgetown University Law Center (did not graduate)	Kennedy	
		Vacant		November 22, 1963	January 20, 1965			L. Johnson	
38	Hubert Humphrey	Hubert Humphrey	Minnesota	January 20, 1965	January 20, 1969	Democratic	University of Minnesota, Louisiana State University, Capitol College of Pharmacy	L. Johnson	
39	Spiro T. Agnew	Spiro Agnew	Maryland	January 20, 1969	October 10, 1973	Republican	Johns Hopkins University, University of Baltimore School of Law	Nixon	
		Vacant		October 10, 1973	December 6, 1973			Nixon	
40	Gerald Ford	Gerald Ford	Michigan	December 6, 1973	August 9, 1974	Republican	University of Michigan, Yale Law School	Nixon	
		Vacant		August 9, 1974	December 19, 1974			Ford	
41	Nelson Rockefeller	Nelson Rockefeller	New York	December 19, 1974	January 20, 1977	Republican	Dartmouth College	Ford	
42	Walter Mondale	Walter Mondale	Minnesota	January 20, 1977	January 20, 1981	Democratic	Macalester College, University of Minnesota Law School	Carter	
43	George Herbert Walker Bush	George H. W. Bush	Texas	January 20, 1981	January 20, 1989	Republican	Yale University	Reagan	
44	Dan Quayle	Dan Quayle	Indiana	January 20, 1989	January 20, 1993	Republican	DePauw University, Indiana University School of Law – Indianapolis (J.D.)	G. H. W. Bush	
45	Al Gore	Al Gore	Tennessee	January 20, 1993	January 20, 2001	Democratic	Harvard University, Vanderbilt University	Clinton	
46	Dick Cheney	Dick Cheney	Wyoming	January 20, 2001	January 20, 2009	Republican	University of Wyoming	G. W. Bush	
47	Joe Biden	Joe Biden	Delaware	January 20, 2009	January 20, 2017	Democratic	University of Delaware, Syracuse University College of Law (J.D.)	Obama	
48	Mike Pence	Mike Pence	Indiana	January 20, 2017	January 20, 2021	Republican	Hanover College, Indiana University School of Law – Indianapolis (J.D.)	Trump	
49	Kamala Harris	Kamala Harris	California	January 20, 2021	January 20, 2025	Democratic	Howard University, University of California, Hastings College of the Law (J.D.)	Biden	
50	JD Vance	JD Vance	Ohio	January 20, 2025	Incumbent	Republican	Ohio State University (BA), Yale Law School (JD)	Trump	

== See also ==
- List of presidents of the United States by education
