= List of prime ministers of the United Kingdom by education =

Universities attended by British prime ministers
University	Number of prime ministers
Oxford	31
Cambridge	15
Edinburgh	3
Glasgow	3
Other British university	4
University outside UK	5
No university	8

A bar chart of universities attended by British prime ministers.

A list of prime ministers of the United Kingdom and the educational institutions they attended. As of July 2026, of the 59 prime ministers to date, 31 were educated at the University of Oxford (including 13 at Christ Church), and 15 at the University of Cambridge (including six at Trinity College), including the incumbent, Andy Burnham. Three attended the University of Edinburgh, three the University of Glasgow, two Mason Science College, a predecessor institution of the University of Birmingham, and one at the University of Leeds. John Major was (as of 2026) the only one of the ten living prime ministers who did not attend university after leaving secondary education. A number of the prime ministers who attended university never graduated.

Twenty prime ministers were schooled at Eton College, of whom nine were educated at Eton and Christ Church, Oxford, including all three who held office between 1880 and 1902 (Gladstone, Salisbury, Rosebery). Seven were educated at Harrow School and six at Westminster School. Rishi Sunak was the second to be educated at Winchester College. Twelve prime ministers to date have been educated at only non-fee-paying schools; these include all five who held office between 1964 and 1997 (Wilson, Heath, Callaghan, Thatcher, Major). Theresa May was educated at both independent and grammar schools. Three did not receive (primary or secondary) school education and were homeschooled during childhood.

Sixteen Prime ministers trained as barristers at the Inns of Court, including 12 at Lincoln's Inn (although not all were called to the bar). Two (Wellington and Churchill) completed officer training at military academies.

Although William Pulteney, 1st Earl of Bath (in 1746) and James Waldegrave, 2nd Earl Waldegrave (in 1757) briefly attempted to form governments, neither is usually counted as prime minister. They are not listed below.

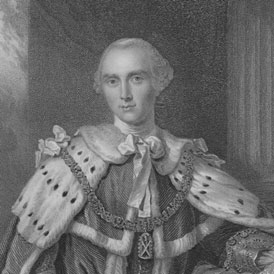
The Earl of Bute (Groningen & Leiden): the first prime minister to graduate from a university outside the UK

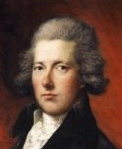
William Pitt the Younger (Pembroke, Cambridge): home schooled; went to Cambridge aged 14, graduated at 17, MP at 21, prime minister at 24. MP for Cambridge University

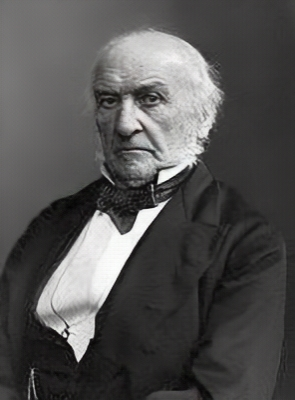
W. E. Gladstone (Eton; Christ Church, Oxford; Lincoln's Inn): attended the three institutions with most alumni prime ministers. MP for Oxford University

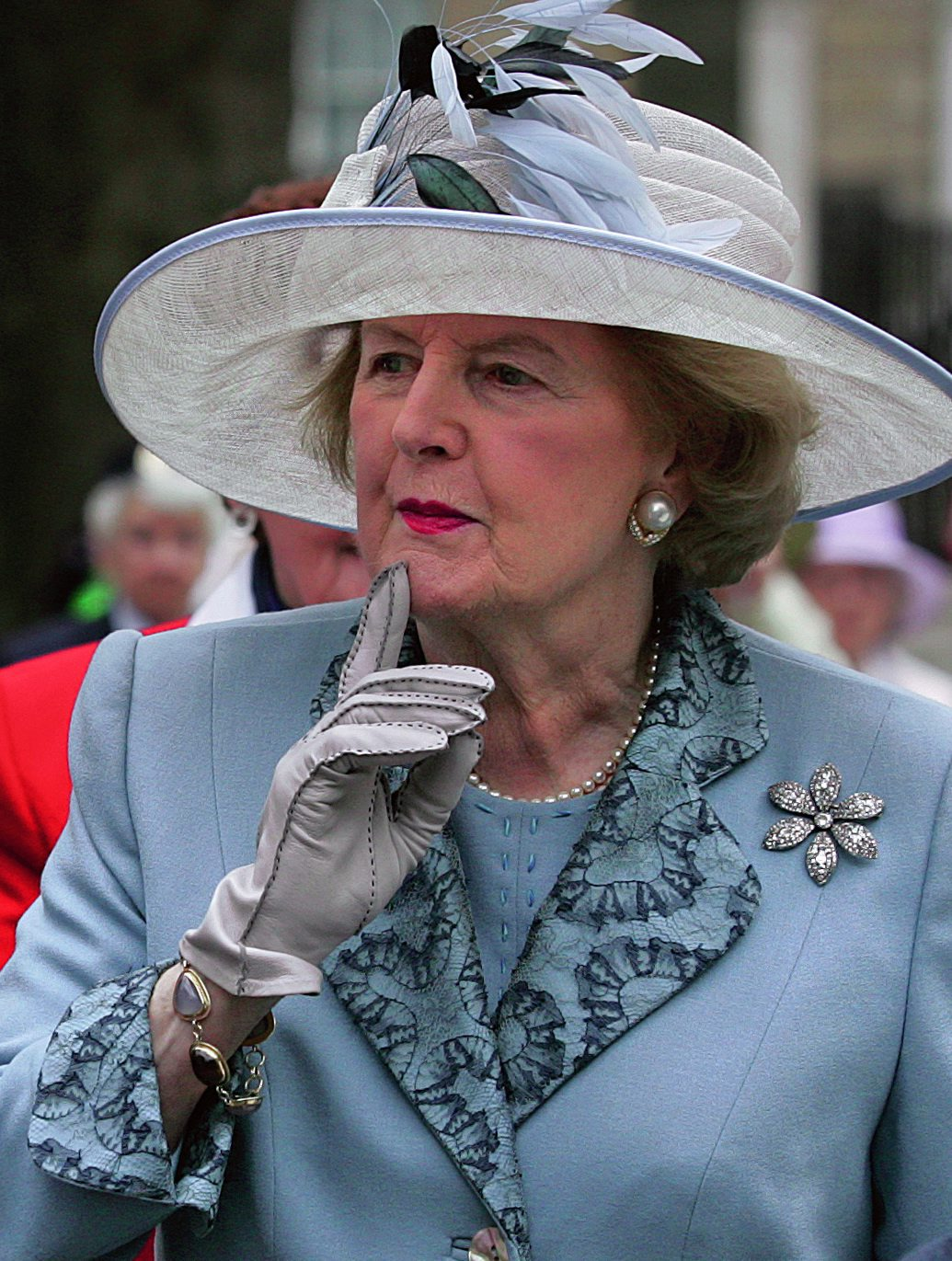
Margaret Thatcher (Somerville, Oxford): the first female PM, educated at an all-female school and college; studied chemistry, the only PM with a degree in a natural science

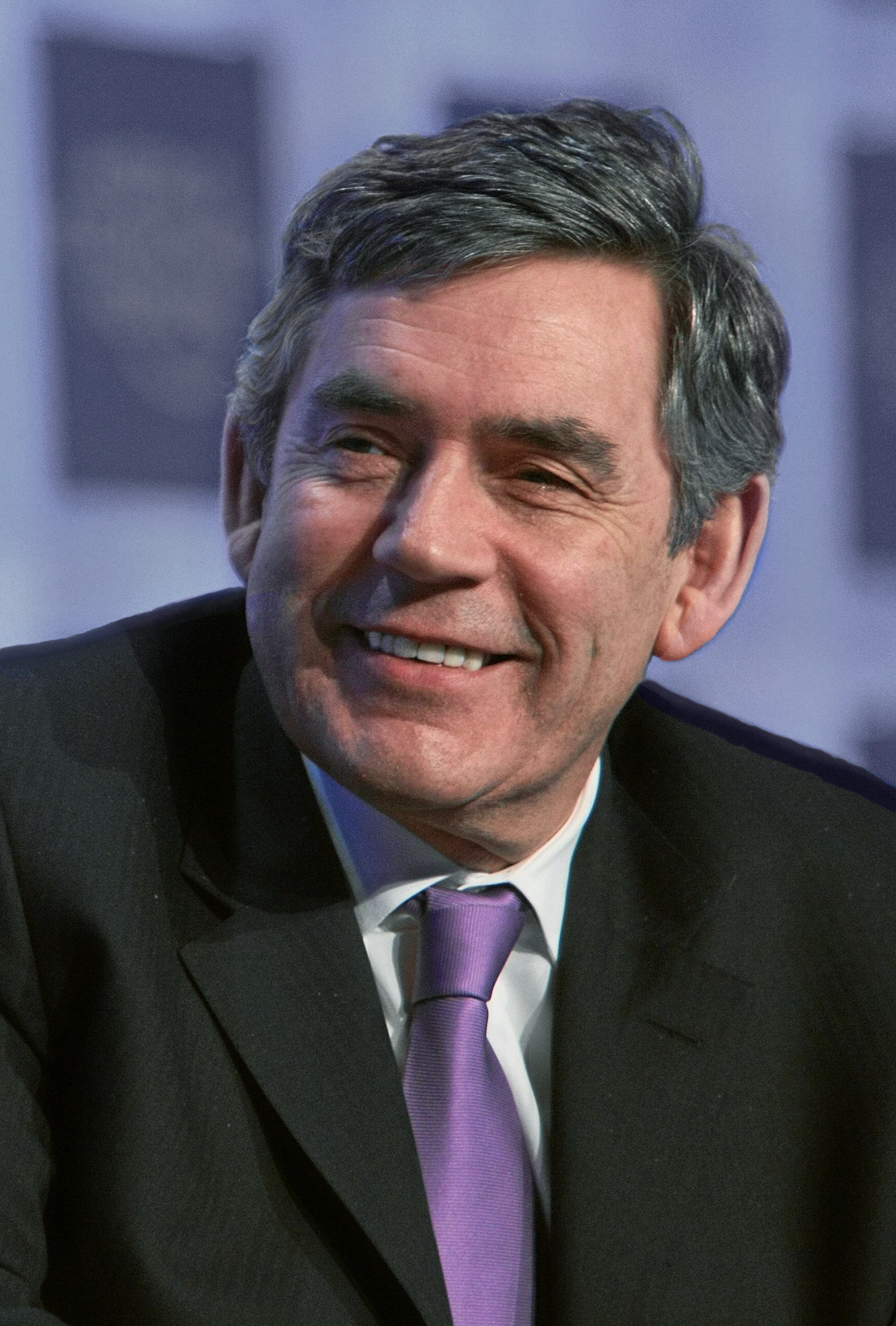
Gordon Brown (Edinburgh): the only prime minister to complete a PhD. Served as university rector 1972–75, while still a student

== List of British prime ministers by education ==
Prime Minister	Term of office	School	University	Degree	Professional training
Robert Walpole	1721–1742	Eton College	Cambridge (King's Coll.)	1696–98, did not graduate (LL.D. 1728)	
Spencer Compton; Earl of Wilmington	1742–1743	St Paul's School	Oxford (Trinity Coll.)	1690–?, did not graduate (D.C.L. 1730)	Inns of Court: Middle Temple
Henry Pelham	1743–1754	Westminster School	Cambridge (King's Coll.)	1709–10	
Henry Pelham	1743–1754	Westminster School	Oxford (Hart Hall)	1710–?, did not graduate	
Thomas Pelham-Holles; Duke of Newcastle	1754–1756; 1757–1762	Westminster School	Cambridge (Clare Coll.)	1710–?, did not graduate (LL.D. 1728)	
William Cavendish; Duke of Devonshire	1756–1757	—	—	—	
John Stuart; Earl of Bute	1762–1763	Eton College	Groningen University	Civil law 1730–32	
John Stuart; Earl of Bute	1762–1763	Eton College	Leiden University	Civil law 1732–34, graduated 1734	
George Grenville	1763–1765	Eton College	Oxford (Christ Church)	1730–?, did not graduate	Inns of Court: Inner Temple
Charles Watson-Wentworth; Marquess of Rockingham	1765–1766; 1782	Westminster School	—	—	
William Pitt the Elder; Earl of Chatham	1766–1768	Eton College	Oxford (Trinity Coll.)	1727–28, did not graduate	
William Pitt the Elder; Earl of Chatham	1766–1768	Eton College	Utrecht University	1728	
Augustus FitzRoy; Duke of Grafton	1768–1770	Westminster School	Cambridge (Peterhouse)	1751–53, M.A. 1753	
Frederick North; Lord North	1770–1782	Eton College	Oxford (Trinity Coll.)	1749–50, M.A. 1750	
Frederick North; Lord North	1770–1782	Eton College	Leipzig University	1751–52	
William Petty (FitzMaurice); Earl of Shelburne	1782–1783	—	Oxford (Christ Church)	1755–57, did not graduate	
William Cavendish-Bentinck; Duke of Portland	1783; 1807–1809	Westminster School	Oxford (Christ Church)	1755–57, M.A. 1757	
William Pitt the Younger	1783–1801; 1804–1806	—	Cambridge (Pembroke Coll.)	1773–76, M.A. 1776	
Henry Addington	1801–1804	Winchester College	Oxford (Brasenose Coll.)	1774–78, B.A. 1778 (M.A. 1780)	Inns of Court: Lincoln's Inn
William Grenville; Lord Grenville	1806–1807	Eton College	Oxford (Christ Church)	1776–80, B.A. 1780	Inns of Court: Lincoln's Inn
Spencer Perceval	1809–1812	Harrow School	Cambridge (Trinity Coll.)	1780–82, M.A. 1782	Inns of Court: Lincoln's Inn
Robert Jenkinson; Earl of Liverpool	1812–1827	Charterhouse School	Oxford (Christ Church)	1787–90, M.A. 1790	
George Canning	1827	Eton College	Oxford (Christ Church)	1787–91, B.A. 1791 (M.A. 1794)	
Frederick J. Robinson; Viscount Goderich	1827–1828	Harrow School	Cambridge (St John's Coll.)	1799–1802, M.A. 1802	
Arthur Wellesley; Duke of Wellington	1828–1830; 1834	Eton College	—	—	French Royal Academy of Equitation, Angers
Charles Grey; Earl Grey	1830–1834	Eton College	Cambridge (Trinity Coll.)	1781–83, did not graduate	
William Lamb; Viscount Melbourne	1834; 1835–1841	Eton College	Cambridge (Trinity Coll.)	1796–99, M.A. 1799	Inns of Court: Lincoln's Inn
William Lamb; Viscount Melbourne	1834; 1835–1841	Eton College	Glasgow University	Resident pupil of Prof. John Millar; 1799–1801	Inns of Court: Lincoln's Inn
Robert Peel	1834–1835; 1841–1846	Harrow School	Oxford (Christ Church)	Classics and Mathematics; 1805–08, B.A. 1808 (M.A. 1814)	Inns of Court: Lincoln's Inn
John Russell; Earl Russell	1846–1852; 1865–1866	Westminster School	Edinburgh University	Resident pupil of Prof. John Playfair; 1809–12	
Edward Smith-Stanley; Earl of Derby	1852; 1858–1859; 1866–1868	Eton College	Oxford (Christ Church)	Classics; 1817–20, did not graduate	
George Hamilton-Gordon; Earl of Aberdeen	1852–1855	Harrow School	Cambridge (St John's Coll.)	1800–04, M.A. 1804	
Henry John Temple; Viscount Palmerston	1855–1858; 1859–1865	Harrow School	Edinburgh University	Resident pupil of Prof. Dugald Stewart; 1800–03	
Henry John Temple; Viscount Palmerston	1855–1858; 1859–1865	Harrow School	Cambridge (St John's Coll.)	1803–06, M.A. 1806	
Benjamin Disraeli; Earl of Beaconsfield	1868; 1874–1880	Dr Cogan's School, Walthamstow	—	—	Inns of Court: Lincoln's Inn
William Ewart Gladstone	1868–1874; 1880–1885; 1886; 1892–1894	Eton College	Oxford (Christ Church)	Classics and Mathematics; 1828–32: B.A. 1832 (M.A. 1834)	Inns of Court: Lincoln's Inn
Robert Gascoyne-Cecil; Marquess of Salisbury	1885–1886; 1886–1892; 1895–1902	Eton College	Oxford (Christ Church)	Mathematics; 1847–50, B.A. 1850 (M.A. 1853), Fellow of All Souls Coll. 1853	Inns of Court: Lincoln's Inn
Archibald Primrose; Earl of Rosebery	1894–1895	Eton College	Oxford (Christ Church)	1866–68, did not graduate	
Arthur Balfour	1902–1905	Eton College	Cambridge (Trinity Coll.)	Moral Sciences; 1866–70, B.A. 1870 (M.A. 1874)	
Henry Campbell-Bannerman	1905–1908	High School of Glasgow	Glasgow University	Greek and Logic; 1851–53	
Henry Campbell-Bannerman	1905–1908	High School of Glasgow	Cambridge (Trinity Coll.)	Classics; 1854–58, B.A. 1858 (M.A. 1861)	
H. H. Asquith	1908–1916	City of London School	Oxford (Balliol Coll.)	Classics; 1870–74, B.A. 1874, Fellow 1874–82	Inns of Court: Lincoln's Inn
David Lloyd George	1916–1922	Llanystumdwy National School	—	—	Solicitor
Bonar Law	1922–1923	High School of Glasgow	Glasgow University	Extramural student 1879–80	
Stanley Baldwin	1923–1924; 1924–1929; 1935–1937	Harrow School	Cambridge (Trinity Coll.)	History; 1885–88, B.A. 1888 (M.A. 1892)	
Stanley Baldwin	1923–1924; 1924–1929; 1935–1937	Harrow School	Mason College	Metallurgy	
Ramsay MacDonald	1924; 1929–1935	Drainie Parish School	Birkbeck Literary and Scientific Institution	Extramural student 1886–87	
Neville Chamberlain	1937–1940	Rugby School	Mason College	Metallurgy; 1887–89	
Winston Churchill	1940–1945; 1951–1955	Harrow School	—	—	RMC Sandhurst
Clement Attlee	1945–1951	Haileybury College	Oxford (University Coll.)	Modern History; 1901–04, B.A. 1904 (M.A.)	Inns of Court: Inner Temple
Anthony Eden	1955–1957	Eton College	Oxford (Christ Church)	Persian and Arabic; 1919–22, B.A. 1922 (M.A.)	
Harold Macmillan	1957–1963	Eton College	Oxford (Balliol Coll.)	Classics; 1912–14, did not graduate	
Alec Douglas-Home; Earl of Home	1963–1964	Eton College	Oxford (Christ Church)	Modern History; 1922–25, B.A. 1925 (M.A.)	
Harold Wilson	1964–1970; 1974–1976	Royds Hall Grammar School; Wirral Grammar School for Boys	Oxford (Jesus Coll.)	PPE (transferred from Modern History); 1934–37, B.A. 1937 (M.A.); Fellow of University Coll. 1938–45	
Edward Heath	1970–1974	Chatham House Grammar School	Oxford (Balliol Coll.)	PPE; 1935–39, B.A. 1939 (M.A.)	
James Callaghan	1976–1979	Northern Secondary School, Portsmouth	—	—	Civil Service: Inland Revenue
Margaret Thatcher	1979–1990	Kesteven and Grantham Girls' School	Oxford (Somerville Coll.)	Chemistry; 1943–47, B.A. 1947 (M.A. 1950)	Inns of Court: Lincoln's Inn
John Major	1990–1997	Rutlish School	—	—	Correspondence course in banking
Tony Blair	1997–2007	Fettes College	Oxford (St John's Coll.)	Law; 1972–75, B.A. 1975 (M.A.)	Inns of Court: Lincoln's Inn
Gordon Brown	2007–2010	Kirkcaldy High School	Edinburgh University	History; 1967–82, M.A. 1972, Ph.D. 1982, University Rector 1972–75	
David Cameron	2010–2016	Eton College	Oxford (Brasenose Coll.)	PPE; 1985–88, B.A. 1988 (M.A.)	
Theresa May	2016–2019	Holton Park Girls' Grammar School	Oxford (St Hugh's Coll.)	Geography; 1974–77, B.A. 1977 (M.A.)	
Boris Johnson	2019–2022	Eton College	Oxford (Balliol Coll.)	Classics; 1983–87, B.A. 1987 (M.A.)	
Liz Truss	2022	Roundhay School	Oxford (Merton Coll.)	PPE; 1993–96, B.A.	
Rishi Sunak	2022–2024	Winchester College	Oxford (Lincoln Coll.)	PPE; 1998–2001, B.A.	
Rishi Sunak	2022–2024	Winchester College	Stanford University	Business administration 2004–06, M.B.A. 2006	
Keir Starmer	2024–2026	Reigate Grammar School	Leeds University	Law; 1982–85, LL.B. 1985	Inns of Court: Middle Temple
Keir Starmer	2024–2026	Reigate Grammar School	Oxford (St Edmund Hall)	Law; 1985–86, B.C.L. 1986	Inns of Court: Middle Temple
Andy Burnham	2026–present	St Aelred's Catholic High School	Cambridge (Fitzwilliam Coll.)	English literature 1988–91, B.A. 1991	
Prime Minister	Term of office	School	University	Degree	Professional training

== University offices held ==
=== Chancellor ===
The following prime ministers served as chancellor of their university:

Cambridge:

- Thomas Pelham-Holles, 1st Duke of Newcastle (1748–1768)
- Augustus FitzRoy, 3rd Duke of Grafton (1768–1811)
- Arthur Balfour, 1st Earl Balfour (1919–1930)
- Stanley Baldwin, 1st Earl Baldwin of Bewdley (1930–1947)

Oxford:

- Frederick North, Lord North (1772–1792)
- William Cavendish-Bentinck, 3rd Duke of Portland (1792–1809)
- William Grenville, 1st Baron Grenville (1809–1834)
- Edward Smith-Stanley, 14th Earl of Derby (1852–1869)
- Robert Gascoyne-Cecil, 3rd Marquess of Salisbury (1869–1903)
- Harold Macmillan, 1st Earl of Stockton (1960–1986)

=== Member of Parliament ===
The following prime ministers served as MP for the university constituency for their university:

Cambridge:

- William Pitt the Younger (1784–1806)
- Henry John Temple, 3rd Viscount Palmerston (1811–1831)

Oxford:

- Robert Peel (1817–1829)
- William Ewart Gladstone (1847–1865)

== See also ==
- List of presidents of the United States by education
- List of prime ministers of Australia by education
- List of prime ministers of Canada by academic degrees
- List of presidents of the Philippines by education
- List of first ministers of Scotland by education
