= List of presidents of the United States by education =

Most presidents of the United States received a college education, even most of the earliest. Of the first seven presidents, five were college graduates. College degrees have set the presidents apart from the general population, and presidents have held degrees even though it was quite rare and unnecessary for practicing most occupations, including law. Of the 45 individuals to have been the president, 24 graduated from a private undergraduate college, 9 graduated from a public undergraduate college, and 12 held no degree. Every president since 1953 has had a bachelor's degree, reflecting the increasing importance of higher education in the United States. 16 presidents received a Bachelor's or advanced degree from colleges in the Ivy League.

== List by university attended ==
=== Did not graduate from college ===
- George Washington (The death of Washington's father ended his formal schooling. The College of William & Mary issued surveying licenses in Virginia, and Washington received his license from the College in 1749 — surveyors did not attend classes at the school. Washington believed strongly in formal education, and his will left money and/or stocks to support three educational institutions, including George Washington University and Washington and Lee University)
- James Monroe (attended the College of William & Mary, but dropped out to fight in the Revolutionary War)
- Andrew Jackson (qualified as a lawyer in the age before law schools, where a kind of apprenticeship system was used)
- Martin Van Buren (read for the law, like Jackson)
- William Henry Harrison (attended Hampden–Sydney College for three years but did not graduate and then attended University of Pennsylvania School of Medicine but never received a degree)
- Zachary Taylor (received an Army commission without any formal training)
- Millard Fillmore (read for the law; founded the University at Buffalo)
- Abraham Lincoln (had only about a year of formal schooling of any kind)
- Andrew Johnson (no formal schooling of any kind)
- Grover Cleveland (read for the law)
- William McKinley (attended Allegheny College, but did not graduate; also attended Albany Law School, but also did not graduate)
- Harry S. Truman (went to business college and law school, but did not graduate)

=== Undergraduate ===
School	Location	Degree	President(s)
Allegheny College	Meadville, Pennsylvania	N/A	William McKinley (withdrew)
Amherst College	Amherst, Massachusetts	Bachelor of Arts	Calvin Coolidge
Bowdoin College	Brunswick, Maine	Bachelor of Arts	Franklin Pierce
College of William & Mary	Williamsburg, Virginia	N/A; N/A; Bachelor of Arts	Thomas Jefferson; James Monroe (withdrew); John Tyler
Columbia University	New York, New York	B.A. Political Science	Barack Obama
Davidson College	Davidson, North Carolina	N/A	Woodrow Wilson (transferred to Princeton University)
Dickinson College	Carlisle, Pennsylvania	Bachelor of Arts	James Buchanan
Eureka College	Eureka, Illinois	B.A. Economics and Sociology	Ronald Reagan
Fordham University	Bronx, New York	N/A	Donald Trump (transferred to the University of Pennsylvania)
Georgetown University	Washington, D.C.	B.S. Foreign Services	Bill Clinton
Georgia Southwestern State University	Americus, Georgia	N/A	Jimmy Carter (transferred to Georgia Institute of Technology)
Georgia Institute of Technology	Atlanta, Georgia	N/A	Jimmy Carter (transferred to United States Naval Academy)
Hampden–Sydney College	Hampden Sydney, Virginia	N/A	William Henry Harrison (withdrew)
Harvard University	Cambridge, Massachusetts	Bachelor of Arts; Bachelor of Arts; Bachelor of Arts; B.A. History; B.A. Government	John Adams; John Quincy Adams; Theodore Roosevelt; Franklin D. Roosevelt; John F. Kennedy
Hiram College	Hiram, Ohio	Bachelor of Arts	James A. Garfield (transferred to Williams College)
Kenyon College	Gambier, Ohio	BA	Rutherford B. Hayes
London School of Economics, University of London	London, United Kingdom	N/A	John F. Kennedy (enrolled, but did not attend; transferred to Princeton University)
Miami University	Oxford, Ohio	Bachelor of Arts	Benjamin Harrison
University of Mount Union (Note: Known during McKinley's attendance as Mount Union College.)	Alliance, Ohio	N/A	William McKinley (withdrew)
Occidental College	Los Angeles, California	B.A. Political Science	Barack Obama (transferred to Columbia University)
Ohio Central College	Iberia, Ohio	Bachelor of Science	Warren G. Harding
University of Oxford	Oxford, United Kingdom	N/A	Bill Clinton (attended for two years as a Rhodes Scholar, but left without completing a degree to take a scholarship at Yale Law School)
Princeton University	Princeton, New Jersey	N/A; Bachelor of Arts; Bachelor of Arts	John F. Kennedy (transferred to Harvard University); James Madison; Woodrow Wilson
Texas State University (Note: Known during Johnson's attendance as Southwest Texas State Teachers College.)	San Marcos, Texas	B.S. History	Lyndon B. Johnson
Spalding's Commercial College (Note: A business college.)	Kansas City, Missouri	N/A	Harry S. Truman (withdrew)
Stanford University	Stanford, California	B.A. Geology	Herbert Hoover
Leiden University	Leiden, Netherlands	N/A	John Quincy Adams (transferred to Harvard University)
Union College	Schenectady, New York	Bachelor of Arts	Chester A. Arthur
United States Military Academy	West Point, New York	N/A; B.S.	Ulysses S. Grant; Dwight D. Eisenhower
United States Naval Academy	Annapolis, Maryland	B.S.	Jimmy Carter
University of Delaware	Newark, Delaware	Double Major, B.A. History and Political Science	Joe Biden
University of Michigan	Ann Arbor, Michigan	B.A. Economics	Gerald Ford
University of North Carolina at Chapel Hill (Note: Known as the University of North Carolina until 1963. Since 1972, the "University of North Carolina" name has applied to the state's public university system.)	Chapel Hill, North Carolina	Bachelor of Arts	James K. Polk
University of Pennsylvania	Philadelphia, Pennsylvania	B.S. Economics; Classical Education	Donald Trump; William Henry Harrison (attended University of Pennsylvania School of Medicine but never received a degree)
Whittier College	Whittier, California	Bachelor of Arts	Richard Nixon
Williams College	Williamstown, Massachusetts	Bachelor of Arts	James A. Garfield
Yale University	New Haven, Connecticut	Bachelor of Arts; B.S. Economics; B.A. History	William Howard Taft; George H. W. Bush; George W. Bush

==== Additional undergraduate information ====
Some presidents attended more than one institution. George Washington never attended college, though the College of William & Mary did issue him a surveyor's certificate. One president attended a foreign college at the undergraduate level: John Quincy Adams at Leiden University (John F. Kennedy intended to study at the London School of Economics, but failed to attend as he fell ill before classes began.) Bill Clinton won a Rhodes Scholarship, enrolling at the University of Oxford in Fall 1968, where he read for a BPhil in politics. He left Oxford without earning a degree in order to enroll at Yale Law School.

Three presidents have attended the United States service academies: Ulysses S. Grant and Dwight D. Eisenhower graduated from the United States Military Academy at West Point, while Jimmy Carter graduated from the United States Naval Academy at Annapolis, Maryland. No presidents have graduated from the United States Coast Guard Academy or the much newer United States Air Force Academy. Eisenhower also graduated from the Army Command and General Staff College, Army Industrial College, and Army War College. These were not degree-granting institutions when Eisenhower attended, but were part of his professional education as a career soldier.

=== Graduate school ===
A total of 21 presidents attended some form of graduate school (including professional schools). Among them, eleven presidents received a graduate degree during their lifetimes; two more received graduate degrees posthumously.

==== Business school ====
School	Location	President(s)
Harvard Business School	Boston, Massachusetts	George W. Bush (MBA)
Stanford Business School	Stanford, California	John F. Kennedy (withdrew)

==== Graduate school ====
School	Location	President(s)
Harvard University	Cambridge, Massachusetts	John Adams (AM); John Quincy Adams (AM)
Johns Hopkins University	Baltimore, Maryland	Woodrow Wilson (PhD)

==== Medical school ====
School	Location	President(s)
Medical Department of University of Pennsylvania	Philadelphia, Pennsylvania	William Henry Harrison (withdrew)

==== Law school ====
School	Location	President(s)
Albany Law School	Albany, New York	William McKinley (withdrew)
Columbia Law School	New York, New York	Theodore Roosevelt (withdrew; JD awarded posthumously in 2008, Class of 1882); Franklin D. Roosevelt (withdrew; JD awarded posthumously in 2008, Class of 1907)
Duke University School of Law	Durham, North Carolina	Richard Nixon (LLB)
Georgetown University Law Center	Washington, D.C.	Lyndon B. Johnson (withdrew)
Harvard Law School	Cambridge, Massachusetts	Rutherford B. Hayes (LLB); Barack Obama (JD)
Kansas City Law School (now University of Missouri–Kansas City School of Law)	Kansas City, Missouri	Harry S. Truman (withdrew)
University of Michigan Law School	Ann Arbor, Michigan	Gerald Ford (transferred)
Northampton Law School	Northampton, Massachusetts	Franklin Pierce (did not graduate)
State and National Law School	Ballston Spa, New York	Chester A. Arthur (did not graduate)
Syracuse University College of Law	Syracuse, New York	Joe Biden (JD)
Cincinnati Law School	Cincinnati, Ohio	William Howard Taft (LLB)
University of Virginia School of Law	Charlottesville, Virginia	Woodrow Wilson (withdrew)
Yale Law School	New Haven, Connecticut	Gerald Ford (LLB); Bill Clinton (JD)

Several presidents who were lawyers did not attend law school, but became lawyers after independent study under the tutelage of established attorneys. Some had attended college before beginning their legal studies, and several studied law without first having attended college. Presidents who were lawyers but did not attend law school include: John Adams; Thomas Jefferson; James Madison; James Monroe; John Quincy Adams; Andrew Jackson; Martin Van Buren; John Tyler; James K. Polk; Millard Fillmore; James Buchanan; Abraham Lincoln; James A. Garfield; Grover Cleveland; Benjamin Harrison; and Calvin Coolidge.

Presidents who were admitted to the bar after a combination of law school and independent study include: Franklin Pierce; Chester A. Arthur; William McKinley; and Woodrow Wilson.

== List by graduate degree earned ==
=== Ph.D. (research doctorate) ===
School	Location	President(s)
Johns Hopkins University	Baltimore, Maryland	Woodrow Wilson

=== M.B.A. (Master of Business Administration) ===
School	Location	President(s)
Harvard Business School	Boston, Massachusetts	George W. Bush

=== M.A. (Master of Arts) ===
School	Location	President(s)
Harvard University	Cambridge, Massachusetts	John Adams; John Quincy Adams

Note: John Adams and John Quincy Adams, along with George W. Bush are the only presidents to date to attain master's degrees.

=== J.D. or LL.B. (law) ===
School	Location	President(s)
University of Cincinnati College of Law	Cincinnati, Ohio	William Howard Taft
Duke University School of Law	Durham, North Carolina	Richard Nixon
Yale Law School	New Haven, Connecticut	Gerald Ford; Bill Clinton
Harvard Law School	Cambridge, Massachusetts	Rutherford B. Hayes; Barack Obama
Syracuse University College of Law	Syracuse, New York	Joe Biden
Columbia Law School	New York, New York	Theodore Roosevelt; Franklin D. Roosevelt

Note: Hayes, Taft, Nixon and Ford were awarded LL.B. degrees. When most U.S. law schools began to award the J.D. as the professional degree in law during the 1960s, previous graduates had the choice of converting their LL.B. degrees to a J.D. Duke University Law School made the change in 1968, and Yale Law School in 1971.

== List by president ==
Presidents	High school or equivalent	Undergraduate school	Graduate school
George Washington	Lower Church School	none	none
John Adams	Braintree Latin School	Harvard University	Harvard University (A.M.)
Thomas Jefferson	James Maury's School	The College of William & Mary	none
James Madison	Donald Robertson's School	Princeton University	none
James Monroe	Campbelltown Academy	The College of William & Mary (did not graduate)	none
John Quincy Adams	Passy Academy	Leiden University (transferred); Harvard University	Harvard University (A.M.)
Andrew Jackson	William Humphries' Academy; James White Stephenson's Academy	none	none
Martin Van Buren	Kinderhook Academy; Washington Seminary	none	none
William Henry Harrison	Millfield Academy	Hampden–Sydney College (withdrew)	University of Pennsylvania School of Medicine (withdrew)
John Tyler	College of William & Mary Preparatory School	The College of William & Mary	none
James K. Polk	Zion Presbyterian Church Academy; Bradley Academy	University of North Carolina (now University of North Carolina at Chapel Hill)	none
Zachary Taylor	Kean O'Hara's Academy	none	none
Millard Fillmore	New Hope Academy	none	none
Franklin Pierce	Phillips Exeter Academy	Bowdoin College	Northampton Law School (withdrew)
James Buchanan	Old Stone Academy	Dickinson College	none
Abraham Lincoln	Briefly attended schools in Hardin County, Kentucky and Spencer County, Indiana	none	none
Andrew Johnson	Tutored while an apprentice tailor and by his wife	none	none
Ulysses S. Grant	Maysville Academy	United States Military Academy	none
Rutherford B. Hayes	Norwalk Seminary; The Webb School	Kenyon College	Harvard Law School
James Garfield	Geauga Seminary	Hiram College (transferred); Williams College	none
Chester A. Arthur	Schenectady Lyceum and Academy	Union College	State and National Law School (did not graduate)
Grover Cleveland	Clinton Academy	none	none
Benjamin Harrison	Farmers' College	Miami University	none
William McKinley	Poland Academy	Allegheny College (withdrew); Mount Union College (now University of Mount Union) (withdrew)	Albany Law School (withdrew)
Theodore Roosevelt	Schooled at home by parents and private tutors	Harvard University	Columbia Law School (withdrew) (awarded J.D. in 2008, class of 1882)
William Howard Taft	Woodward High School	Yale University	University of Cincinnati College of Law
Woodrow Wilson	Schooled at home by parents and private tutors	Davidson College (transferred); Princeton University	University of Virginia School of Law (withdrew); Johns Hopkins University Zanvyl Krieger School of Arts and Sciences (Ph.D.)
Warren G. Harding	Caledonia High School	Ohio Central College	none
Calvin Coolidge	Black River Academy; St. Johnsbury Academy	Amherst College	none
Herbert Hoover	Friends Pacific Academy (now George Fox University)	Capital Business College (attended); Stanford University	none
Franklin D. Roosevelt	Groton School	Harvard University	Columbia Law School (withdrew) (awarded J.D. in 2008, class of 1907)
Harry S. Truman	Independence High School	Spalding's Commercial College (withdrew)	Kansas City Law School (now University of Missouri–Kansas City School of Law) (withdrew)
Dwight D. Eisenhower	Abilene High School	United States Military Academy (West Point)	United States Army Command and General Staff College; United States Army Industrial College; United States Army War College
John F. Kennedy	Dexter School; The Choate School	London School of Economics (General Course Program); Princeton University (transferred); Harvard University	Stanford Graduate School of Business (auditor)
Lyndon B. Johnson	Johnson City High School	Southwest Texas State Teachers College (now Texas State University)	Georgetown University Law Center (withdrew)
Richard Nixon	Whittier High School	Whittier College	Duke University School of Law
Gerald Ford	Grand Rapids South High School	University of Michigan	University of Michigan Law School (transferred); Yale Law School
Jimmy Carter	Plains High School	Georgia Southwestern College (transferred); Georgia Institute of Technology (transferred); United States Naval Academy	Union College (Postgraduate Nuclear Physics Course Program)
Ronald Reagan	Dixon High School	Eureka College	none
George H. W. Bush	Phillips Academy	Yale University	none
Bill Clinton	Hot Springs High School	Georgetown University; University of Oxford (Rhodes Scholar; withdrew)	Yale Law School (J.D.)
George W. Bush	The Kinkaid School; Phillips Academy	Yale University	Harvard Business School (M.B.A.)
Barack Obama	Punahou School	Occidental College (transferred); Columbia University	Harvard Law School (J.D.)
Donald Trump	New York Military Academy	Fordham University (transferred); Wharton School of the University of Pennsylvania	none
Joe Biden	Archmere Academy	University of Delaware	Syracuse University College of Law (J.D.)

== Other academic associations ==
=== Faculty member ===
President(s)	School	Position	Years
James A. Garfield	Hiram College	Professor of Latin, Greek, Mathematics, History, Philosophy, Rhetoric and English literature	1857–1861
Grover Cleveland	Princeton University	Stafford Little Lecturer on Public Affairs	1899–1908
William Howard Taft	University of Cincinnati College of Law	Dean	1896–1900
William Howard Taft	Yale Law School	Kent Professor of Law	1913–1921
William Howard Taft	Boston University School of Law	Lecturer on Legal Ethics	1918–1921
Woodrow Wilson	Bryn Mawr College	Professor of Politics and History	1885–1888
Woodrow Wilson	Wesleyan University	Professor of Politics	1888–1890
Woodrow Wilson	Princeton University	Professor of Jurisprudence and Political Economy	1890–1902
Harry S. Truman	Yale University	Chubb Fellow Visiting Lecturer	1958
Harry S. Truman	Canisius College	Visiting Lecturer	1962
Richard Nixon	Whittier College	Adjunct lecturer, taught undergraduate legal studies class	1937–1942
Jimmy Carter	Emory University	University Distinguished Professor	1982–2024 (post-presidency)
George H. W. Bush	Rice University	Part-Time Professor of Administrative Science	1978
Bill Clinton	University of Arkansas	Assistant Professor of Law	1973–1977
Barack Obama	University of Chicago Law School	Senior Lecturer	1992–2004
Joe Biden	Widener University Delaware Law School	Adjunct Professor	1991–2008
Joe Biden	University of Pennsylvania	Benjamin Franklin Presidential Practice professor	2017–2019

=== School rector or president ===
President(s)	School	Position	Years
Thomas Jefferson	University of Virginia	1st rector	1819–1826
James Madison	University of Virginia	2nd rector	1826–1836
John Tyler	College of William & Mary	Chancellor	1859–1862
Millard Fillmore	University of Buffalo	Chancellor	1846–1874
James A. Garfield	Hiram College	President	1857–1860
Woodrow Wilson	Princeton University	President	1902–1910
Dwight D. Eisenhower	Columbia University	President	1948–1953

=== School trustee or governor ===
President(s)	School	Position	Years
George Washington	College of William & Mary	Chancellor	1788–1799
George Washington	Washington College	Allowed use of his name, Benefactor, Board of Governors	1782–1799
George Washington	George Washington University	Left shares in his will to establish a university in the District of Columbia	1799
George Washington	Washington and Lee University	Benefactor	1796
Thomas Jefferson	University of Virginia	Board of Visitors	1819–1826
James Madison	University of Virginia	Board of Visitors	1819–1836
James Madison	Madison College (Pennsylvania)	Allowed use of his name; benefactor: contributed funds ($2,000 in 1827 dollars) towards founding	1827
James Monroe	George Washington University	Benefactor	1821
James Monroe	University of Virginia	Board of Visitors	1826–1831
John Quincy Adams	Harvard University	Board of Overseers	1830–1848
John Quincy Adams	George Washington University	Benefactor, Board of Trustees	1832
Andrew Jackson	University of Nashville	Board of Trustees	1806–1845
Martin Van Buren	University of the State of New York	Board of Regents	1816–1829
Franklin Pierce	Norwich University	Board of Trustees	1841–1859
James Buchanan	Franklin & Marshall College	President, Board of Trustees	1853–1865
Ulysses S. Grant	George Washington University	Board of Trustees	1869–1877
Rutherford B. Hayes	Ohio State University	Board of Trustees	1881–1893
Rutherford B. Hayes	Western Reserve University	Chairman of the Board of Trustees	1881–1893
Rutherford B. Hayes	Ohio Wesleyan University	Board of Trustees	1884–1893
James A. Garfield	Hiram College	Board of Trustees	1866–1881
James A. Garfield	Hampton University	Board of Trustees	1877–1881
Benjamin Harrison	Purdue University	Board of Trustees	1895–1901
Grover Cleveland	Princeton University	Board of Trustees	1901–1908
William McKinley	American University	Board of Trustees	1899–1901
Theodore Roosevelt	American University	Board of Trustees	1900–1919
Theodore Roosevelt	Harvard University	Board of Overseers	1895–1901, 1915–1916
Theodore Roosevelt	Tuskegee University	Board of Trustees	1910-1919
William Howard Taft	Yale University	Member of the Yale Corporation	1901–1913
William Howard Taft	Hampton University	Board of Trustees	1909–1930
Warren G. Harding	American University	Board of Trustees	1921–1923
Calvin Coolidge	Amherst College	Board of Trustees (life member)	1921–1933
Herbert Hoover	Stanford University	Board of Trustees	1923–1960
Herbert Hoover	American University	Board of Trustees	1945–1950
Franklin D. Roosevelt	Harvard University	Board of Overseers	1917–1923
Franklin D. Roosevelt	Vassar College	Board of Trustees	1923–1945
Dwight D. Eisenhower	Eisenhower College	Namesake, fundraiser	1965–1969
John F. Kennedy	Harvard University	Board of Overseers	1957–1958
Jimmy Carter	Mercer University	Board of Trustees	2012–2024
Ronald Reagan	Eureka College	Board of Trustees	1947–1953, 1967–1973, 1974–1980

== See also ==
- List of vice presidents of the United States by education

Other countries

- List of prime ministers of Australia by education
- List of prime ministers of Canada by academic degrees
- List of presidents of the Philippines by education
- List of prime ministers of the United Kingdom by education
