= Abbotsholme College =

Private school in Sydney, Australia

Location
- Killara, New South Wales, Australia
- 33°45′50″S 151°9′40″E

Information
- Type: Private school
- Motto: Latin: Virtute non verbis (By deeds, not by words)
- Established: 1908
- Founder: John Fitzmaurice
- Status: Closed
- Closed: 1925
- Gender: Boys

Abbotsholme College was an open-air private school in Sydney, New South Wales, Australia. It operated from 1908 to 1925 in the suburb of Killara. Pupils during the school's brief existence included two future prime ministers, William McMahon and Harold Holt.

== History ==
Abbotsholme College was established in 1908 and began taking students the following year. The school's founder and principal was John Fitzmaurice, who was born in Ireland and was a nephew of the naval engineer Maurice Fitzmaurice. He fought with the British Army in the Boer War, after which he moved to Australia for health reasons. He was a proponent of progressive education, and named his new school after Abbotsholme School, which had been established by Cecil Reddie in Staffordshire, England.

The Sydney Mail reported in 1920 that Abbotsholme had buildings and equipment worth £30,000 and grounds of 12 acres (4.9 ha) bounded by Greengate Rd and The Pacific Highway (then Gordon Road). It was promoted as an open air school, and advertisements often claimed that its students had one of the lowest rates of illness in the state. At the height of the 1919 Spanish flu pandemic it was one of the few schools that remained opened. Abbotsholme initially accepted both day students and boarders. However, by 1922 all 160 pupils were boarders, ranging in age from 6 to 19 years.

In 1920, Fitzmaurice established a scholarship scheme for the sons of soldiers who had died in World War I. It initially consisted of 50 scholarships valued at a total of £10,000, and was expanded through later endowments. The scheme drew the attention of Edward, Prince of Wales, who gave permission for them to be called the Prince of Wales Scholarships. Fitzmaurice was prominent in local Freemasonry circles, and in 1923 he gave free-ride scholarships to Abbotsholme to all the former students of the Charles Kolling Masonic College, a school for the sons of deceased Masons that had been forced to close.

== Death of Fitzmaurice and Closure ==
Fitzmaurice died suddenly in January 1924, aged 41. The Daily Telegraph reported that his death was likely to endanger the scholarship schemes he had established, as there were no specific provisions in his will for their continuance. Abbotsholme closed in April 1925, and two months later it "burned practically to the ground" in suspicious circumstances.

== Legacy ==
The school's WWI Roll of Honour board is displayed at St John's Anglican Church, Gordon. Fitzmaurice is buried in St John's cemetery.

== Notable alumni ==
- Harold Holt, Prime Minister of Australia 1966–1967
- William McMahon, Prime Minister of Australia 1971–1972
- Frank Packer, media entrepreneur, patriarch of the Packer family
