= Forrester High School =

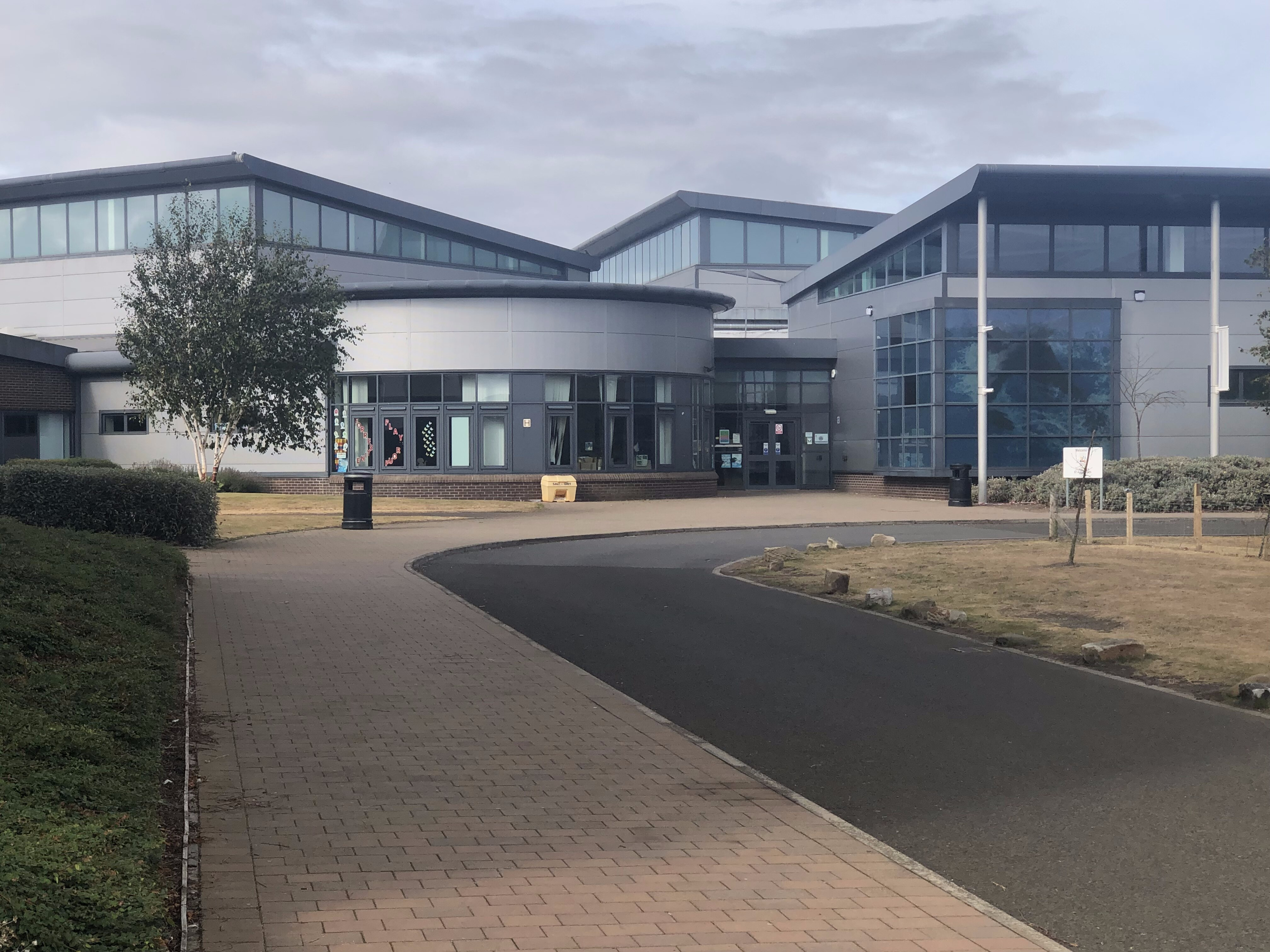
- Entrance in 2025

Location
- 212 Broomhouse Road; Edinburgh, EH12 9AE; Scotland; 55.9317°N 3.2879°W

Information
- Type: Mixed secondary
- Local authority: Edinburgh City Council
- Department for Education URN: 5532736 Tables
- Headteacher: Stephen Small
- Gender: Mixed
- Enrolment: 700
- Houses: Redpath, Burns, Telford
- Website: https://forresterhighschool.org.uk/

Forrester High School is a secondary school in the west of Edinburgh, Scotland.

St Augustine's High School, an RC secondary, moved onto a shared campus with Forrester High School in January 2010. Previously the schools had been next to each other.

== Houses ==
Forrester's pupils are split into three houses:

- Telford House
- Redpath House
- Burns House

== Feeder schools ==
Forrester High School's feeder schools are Broomhouse Primary, Carrick Knowe Primary, Gylemuir Primary and Murrayburn Primary School.

== Notable alumni ==
- Arthur Albiston – Retired footballer
- Ryan Harding – Retired footballer
- Davey Johnstone – Rock musician
- Allan McGregor – Retired footballer, current goalkeeping coach at Rangers
- Les McKeown – Bay City Rollers
- Marjorie Ritchie – Zoologist involved in cloning Dolly the Sheep
- John Swinney – SNP politician and First Minister of Scotland
- Jamie Walker – Footballer
- Lee Wallace – Retired footballer
