= List of prime ministers of Canada by academic degrees =

This is a list of the prime ministers of Canada by their academic degrees. The following list does not include honorary degrees conferred to the prime minister. Four prime ministers attended the University of Toronto, and three attended McGill University, the University of British Columbia, or Université Laval.

#	Prime Minister	Degree	University	Year
1	John A. Macdonald	none - apprenticeship towards becoming a lawyer		
2	Alexander Mackenzie	none		
3	John Abbott	B.C.L.	McGill University	1854
3	John Abbott	D.C.L.	McGill University	1867
4	John Sparrow Thompson	none - apprenticeship towards becoming a lawyer		
5	Mackenzie Bowell	none		
6	Charles Tupper	D.C.L.		
6	Charles Tupper	LL.D		
6	Charles Tupper	M.D.	University of Edinburgh	1843
7	Wilfrid Laurier	LL.L.	McGill University	1864
7	Wilfrid Laurier	D.C.L.		
7	Wilfrid Laurier	LL.D.		
7	Wilfrid Laurier	D.Litt.		
8	Robert Borden	none - articled in law firm towards becoming a lawyer		
9	Arthur Meighen	B.A. in Mathematics	University College at the University of Toronto	1896
9	Arthur Meighen	Law graduate	Osgoode Hall Law School	1902?
9	Arthur Meighen	LL.D.		
10	William Lyon Mackenzie King	B.A.	University of Toronto	1895
10	William Lyon Mackenzie King	LL.B.	University of Toronto	1896
10	William Lyon Mackenzie King	M.A.	University of Toronto	1897
10	William Lyon Mackenzie King	M.A. in political economy	Harvard University	1898
10	William Lyon Mackenzie King	Ph.D.	Harvard University	1909
11	Richard Bedford Bennett	LL.B.	Dalhousie University	1893
12	Louis St. Laurent	B.A.	Séminaire Saint-Charles-Borromée	1902
12	Louis St. Laurent	LL.L.	Université Laval	1905
12	Louis St. Laurent	D.C.L.		
12	Louis St. Laurent	LL.D.		
13	John Diefenbaker	B.A.	University of Saskatchewan	1915
13	John Diefenbaker	M.A. in Political Science and Economics	University of Saskatchewan	1916
13	John Diefenbaker	LL.B	University of Saskatchewan	1919
13	John Diefenbaker	LL.D.		
13	John Diefenbaker	D.C.L.		
13	John Diefenbaker	D.Litt		
13	John Diefenbaker	D.S.L.		
14	Lester B. Pearson	B.A. in history and sociology	Victoria College at the University of Toronto	1919
14	Lester B. Pearson	B.A. in modern history	St John's College, University of Oxford	1923
14	Lester B. Pearson	M.A. in history	St John's College, University of Oxford	1925
14	Lester B. Pearson	LL.D.		
15	Pierre Trudeau	LL.L.	Université de Montréal	1943
15	Pierre Trudeau	M.A. in political economy	Harvard University	1945
15	Pierre Trudeau	incomplete doctorate studies	London School of Economics	
16	Joe Clark	B.A. in political science	University of Alberta	
16	Joe Clark	M.A. in political science	University of Alberta	
17	John Turner	B.A.h.	The University of British Columbia	1949
17	John Turner	B.A. in Jurisprudence	Magdalen College, University of Oxford	1951
17	John Turner	B.C.L.	Magdalen College, University of Oxford	1952
17	John Turner	M.A.	Magdalen College, University of Oxford	1957
17	John Turner	LL.D.		
18	Brian Mulroney	B.A. in Political Science	St. Francis Xavier University	1959
18	Brian Mulroney	LL.L.	Université Laval	1964
18	Brian Mulroney	LL.D.	Université Laval	
19	Kim Campbell	B.A. in Political Science	The University of British Columbia	1969
19	Kim Campbell	LL.B.	The University of British Columbia	1983
20	Jean Chrétien	B.A.	Séminaire Sainte-Marie	1955
20	Jean Chrétien	LL.L.	Université Laval	1958
21	Paul Martin	B.A. in history and philosophy	St. Michael's College at the University of Toronto	1961
21	Paul Martin	LL.B.	University of Toronto	1965
22	Stephen Harper	B.A. in economics	University of Calgary	1985
22	Stephen Harper	M.A. in economics	University of Calgary	1991
23	Justin Trudeau	B.A. in English	McGill University	1994
23	Justin Trudeau	B.Ed.	University of British Columbia	1998
24	Mark Carney	B.A. in economics	Harvard University	1988
24	Mark Carney	M.Phil. in economics	St Peter's College, University of Oxford	1993
24	Mark Carney	D.Phil. in economics	Nuffield College, University of Oxford	1995
