= Western Park Open Air School =

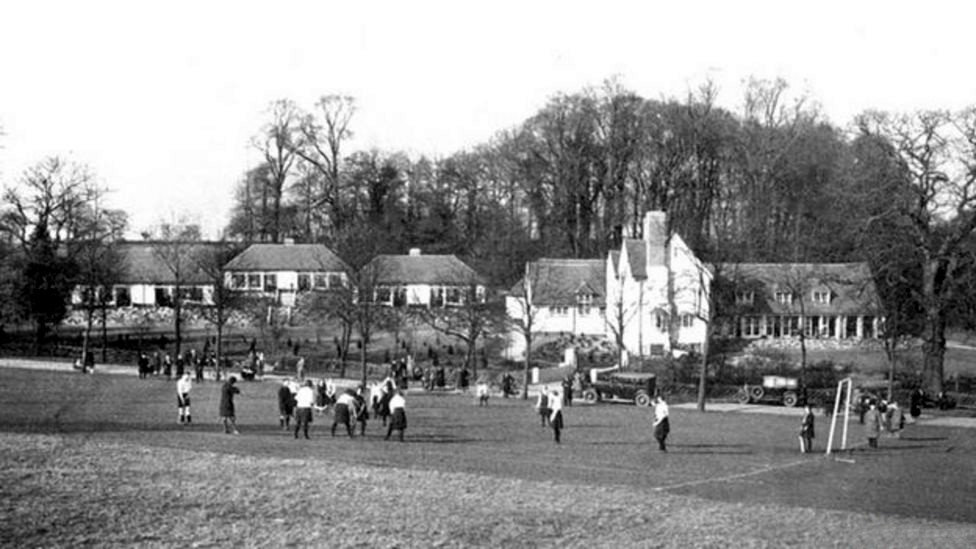

Location
- Western Park, Leicester, UK
- Coordinates: 52°38′12″N 1°10′31″W

Information
- Type: Open air school
- Established: 7 November 1930
- Closed: 2005
- School district: Leicestershire
- Website: Official website

The Western Park Open Air School, situated in Western Park, was the first open air school in Leicester, for children with respiratory problems. It opened on 7 November 1930 and closed in 2005. In 1937, it was chosen by the Royal Institute of British Architects to illustrate its Modern Schools Exhibition. It is Grade II listed with Historic England.

== Background and opening ==
In 1897 the Leicester Corporation bought Western Park, just outside the town, for £30,000. In 1904, the construction of a tramline provided better access to the park. Open-Air Schools increasingly appeared in the early 1900s to prevent further spread of tuberculosis by providing ventilation and fresh air.

Western Park Open Air School, located in Western Park, was the first open air school in Leicester, for children with respiratory problems. It opened on 7 November 1930.

== Building ==
The building was designed by James Osbert Thompson, and constructed using brick between 1928 and 1930. The roof is tiled.

The three terraces of the school are built on a slope and connected by concrete steps and pathways. The central administrative block is an L-shaped building with two floors and a basement. To the north is a single-storey building with dormer windows. To the north-west are three chalet-style blocks grouped together. A long single glazed single-storey is located to the south-east, and to the east is a single-storey pavilion-style building.

In 1974, covered walkways made with plywood and plastic were added to provide connections between the buildings. South of the chalets is a playground with tiered borders around the edges. To the east of the U-shaped building is a gate and paved area, which leads to a plot likely to have been a vegetable garden. The north-east wall is partly buried.

Wide opening windows permitted fresh air.

== Significance ==
In 1931, Leicester's chief school medical officer of health Allan Warner, in the committee minutes, described the school as having a "healthy environment" that could put right a "child's nervous activity which has degenerated owing to disuse". Two years earlier he had maintained that "many health movements" had produced a "health conscience" which in turn expanded the Leicester School Medical Service. The school had modern electric light, lots of sun, access to fresh air and the most recent heating arrangements. He described the aim of the school as to "so train the children that they would eventually become hardy men and women", something he felt was important for a good citizen in the interwar years. In contrast were the "overcrowded sunless rooms" of the schools in the city centre, with "stagnant humid atmosphere of the overcrowded house". This he felt "resulted in children that were "incapable of strenuous muscular action and over sensitive to pain". In one later report, Warner recited George Newman: "the existence and strength of the nation ultimately depends upon the survival of its children and their physical and mental health". In 1937, the school was chosen by the Royal Institute of British Architects to illustrate its Modern Schools Exhibition.

The building is a rare example of a surviving open-air school, and is of historical architectural interest. Many of its original fixtures and fittings remain; slow combustion stoves, carpentry, heaters, cupboards, doors and windows.

== Closure ==
The school closed in 2005. In 2011 it was listed Grade II by Historic England. In May 2022 it was damaged in a fire.

== See also ==
- George H. Widdows
