= Baby cage =

Bed in a wire cage suspended from a window

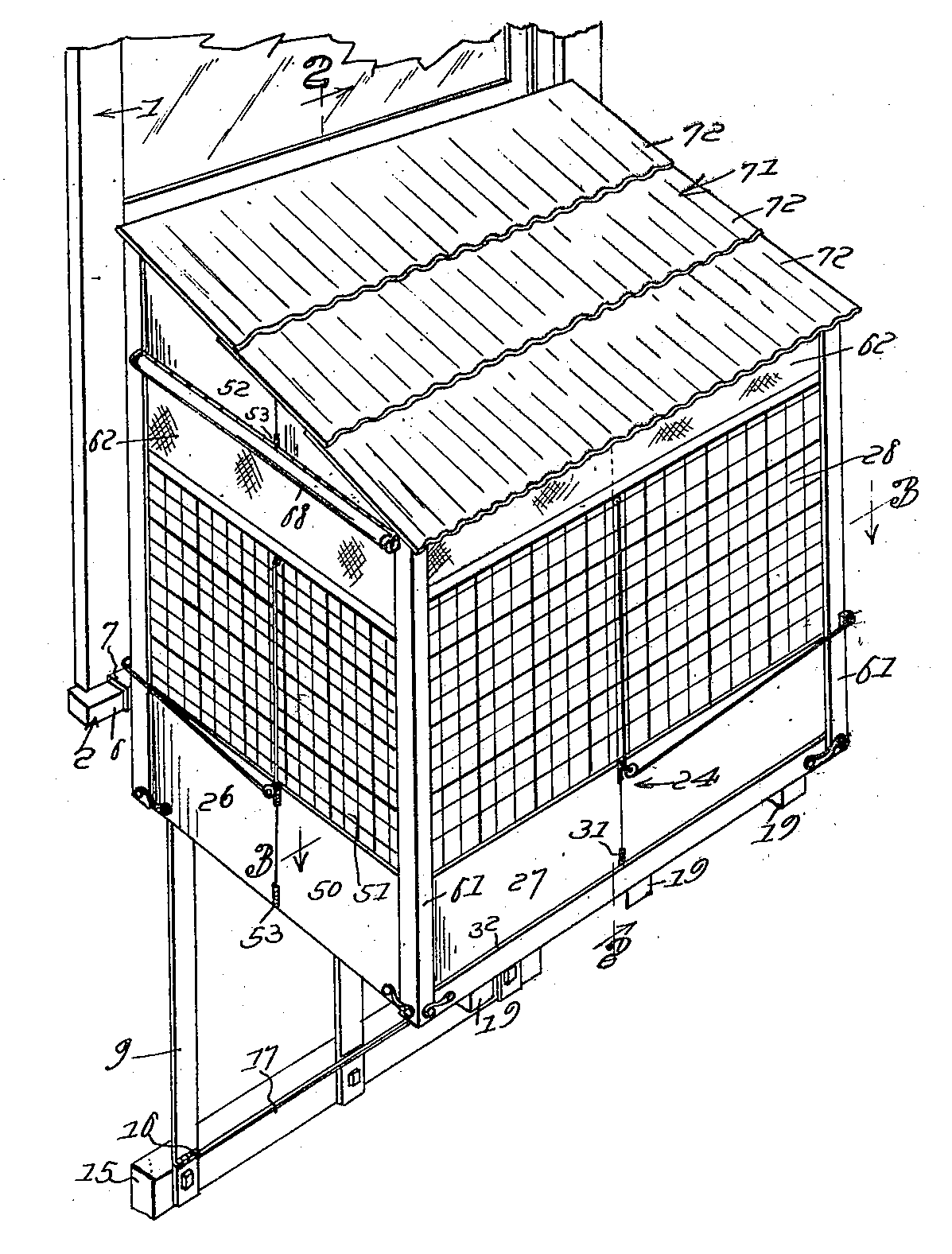
Figure 1 from Emma Read's patent for a "Portable Baby Cage"

A baby cage was a bed in a wire cage suspended from city apartment windows. The "health cage", as it was initially called, was invented by Mrs. Robert C. Lafferty to provide babies with fresh air and sunshine while living in crowded cities.

== History ==
In the early 1900s, many open air schools were built as an attempt to combat the widespread rise of tuberculosis. The belief that open air and ventilation were key in fighting the epidemic inspired the creation of baby cages.

In 1908, according to the recommendations of a doctor who insisted on the need of fresh air for babies, Eleanor Roosevelt attached "a kind of box with wire on the sides and top" to the outside of one of her back windows in her New York home as a place for Anna, her first child born the same year, during her morning naps. Even though Roosevelt was following the same doctor's advice to leave babies crying, the neighbourhood, alerted by the wailing of the child, threatened to report the mother to the New York Society for Prevention of Cruelty toward Children. In later years Roosevelt reported how she was shocked by the reaction of the neighbours, saying she thought she was just being a modern mother.

In 1922, a patent application about a "portable baby cage" has been submitted by Emma Read. This cage was intended to be suspended on the external edge of a window, in which the baby would be placed.

The usage of baby cages gained great popularity in London during the 1930s. The installation had been created for children who live in cities without gardens. These baby cages were given by neighbourhood communities, like the Chelsea Baby Club, to every member who did not have a garden. In 1935, the Royal Institute of British Architects dedicated the balcons pour bébés element as essential to every housing of the middle class, while citing the example of the Chelsea Baby Club initiative. At the beginning of the World War II, the Battle of Britain led by the Luftwaffe ended the usage of baby cages in all London, but they appeared again from 1953, albeit not as popular as before.

Ultimately, the sale of baby cages progressively declined through the mid-1900s, possibly due to safety concerns and the rise of urban automobile traffic.

== Design ==
Although the materials differed, the general design was the same. A mesh cage allowed air and sunlight to pass through while preventing the child from falling out to the street below. Some designs incorporated roofs in order to shield the child from snow, rain, or debris dropped from above.
