= Allan Warner =

Allan Warner may refer to:

- Alan Warner (musician), a.k.a. Allan Warner, English musician
- Allan Warner (physician), British physician

== See also ==
- Alan Warner (disambiguation)
