= Bernhard Bendix =

German pediatrician

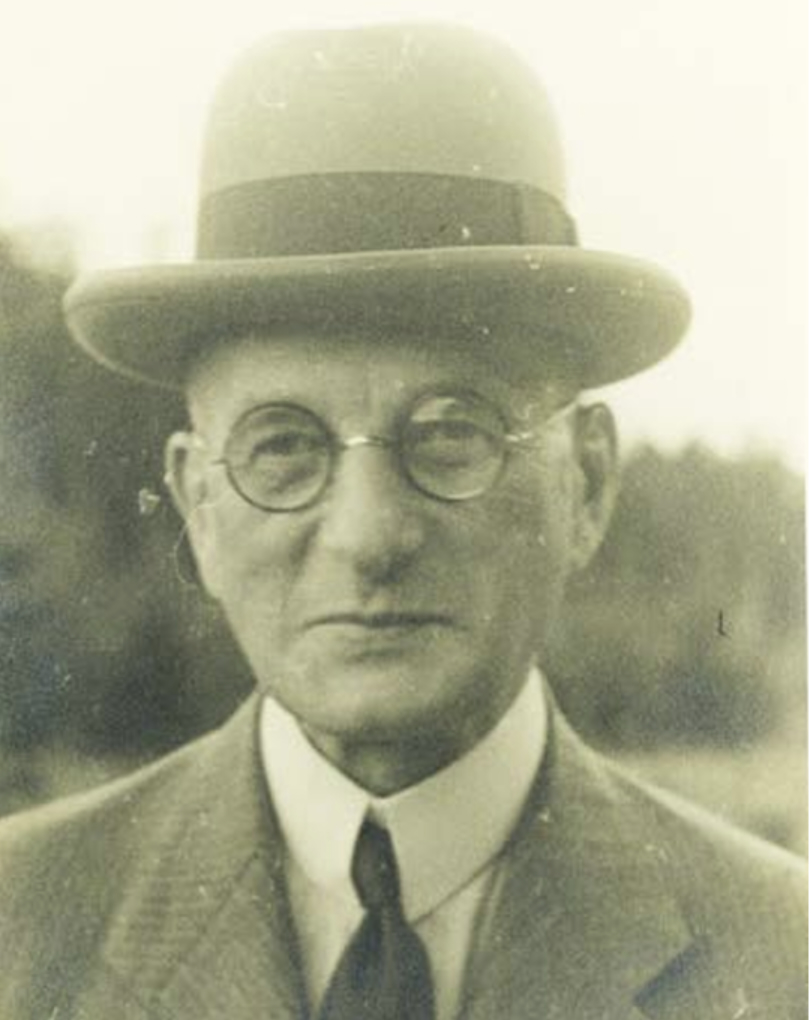
Bernhard Bendix (1938)

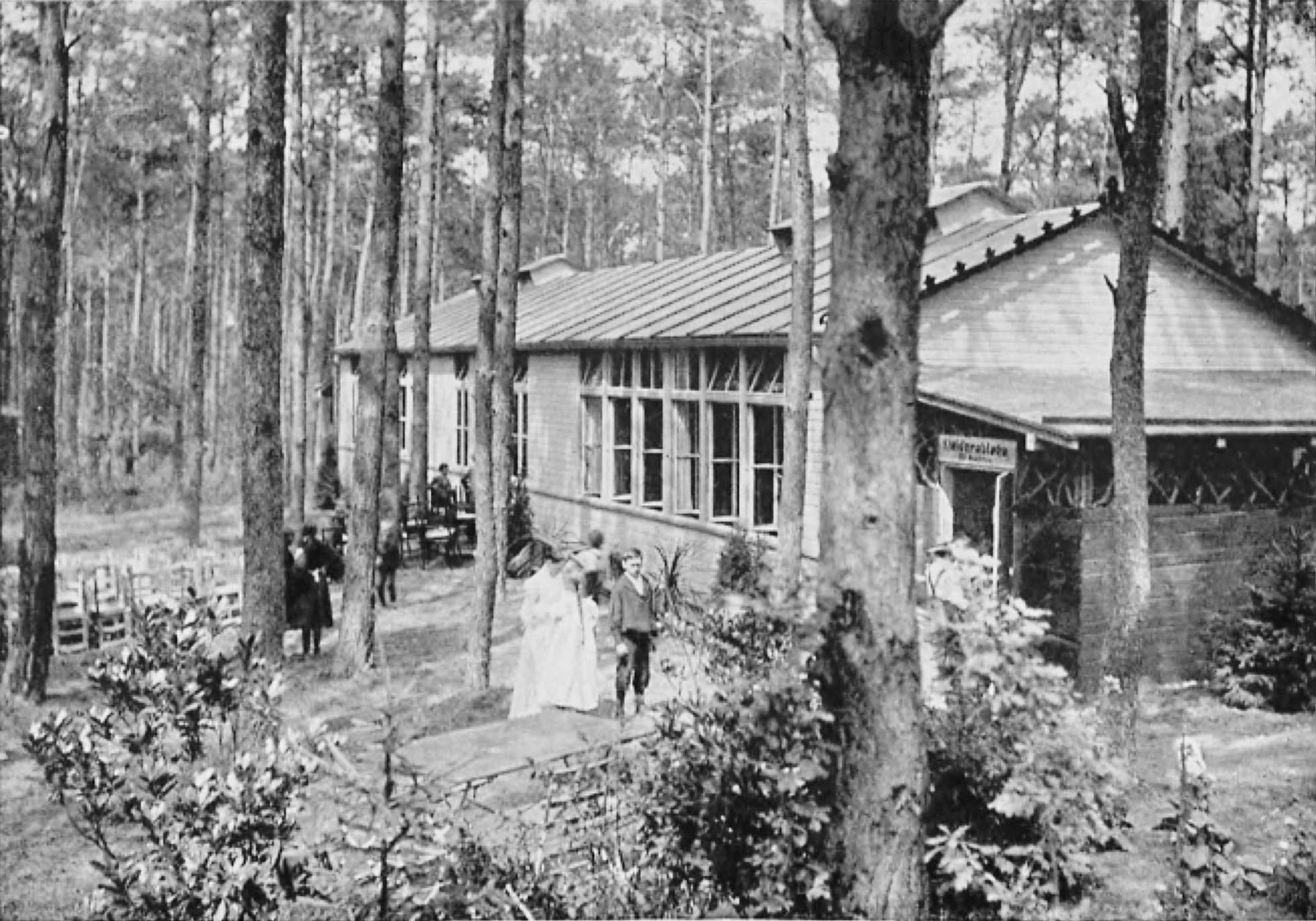
Waldschule für kränkliche Kinder (Forest school for sickly children) in Charlottenburg near Berlin (1904)

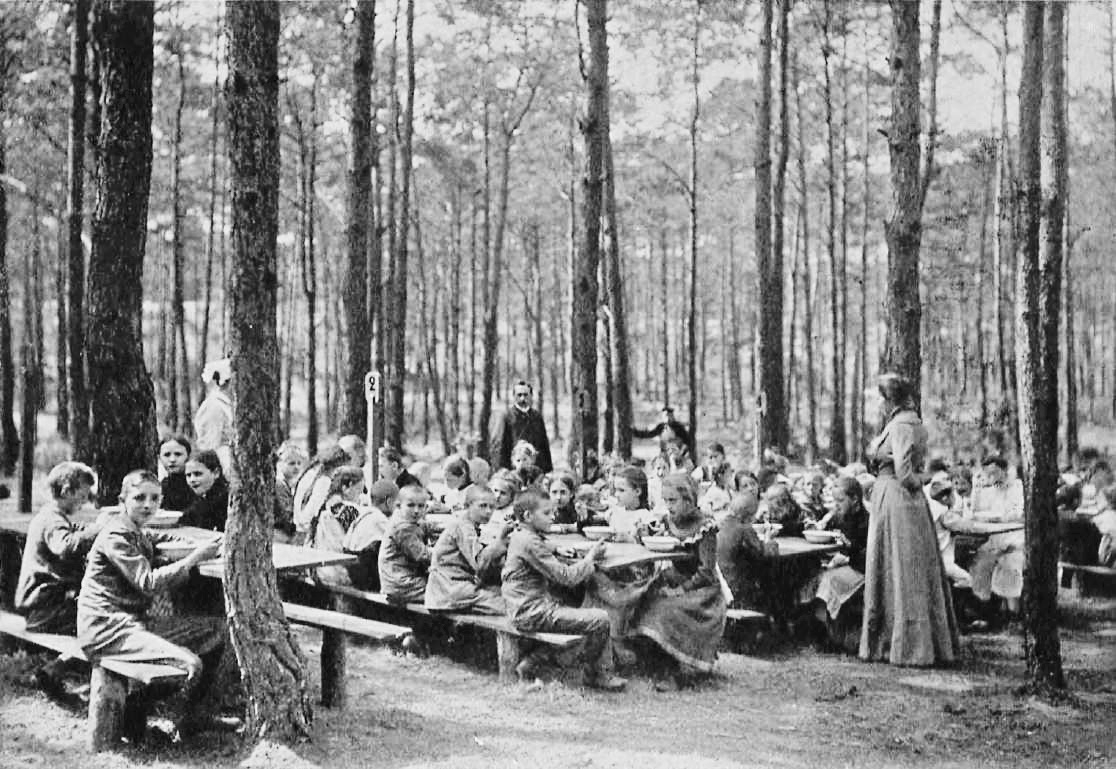
Pupils of Waldschule für kränkliche Kinder taking a snack (1904)

Bernhard Bendix (born Jakob Bernhard Bendix, May 27, 1863 in Großmühlingen, Duchy of Anhalt – January 24, 1943 in Cairo, Egypt), was a prominent German physician and professor at Berlin's Charité hospital. He was known for his work in pediatrics and for co-founding the world's first open-air school.

Bendix studied medicine from 1883 to 1888 at Humboldt University of Berlin, Leipzig University, and the University of Freiburg where he received his Doctor of Medicine degree. Between 1891 and 1894, he worked as an orthopedic assistant at University Hospital in Berlin. From 1894 to 1899, he served as assistant medical director in the Department of Pediatrics at Berlin's Charité hospital under the leadership of Otto Heubner. In 1901, Bendix became licensed to teach as a Privatdozent (trans. associate professor and lecturer) at the Charité, and in 1907 he received the title of adjunct professor. In 1921, he was elevated to außerordentlicher Professor (trans. extraordinary professor).

In 1904, Bendix, together with Hermann Neufert, education councillor for what was then the city of Charlottenburg near Berlin, founded the Waldschule für kränkliche Kinder (trans. Forest School for Sickly Children) the world's first open-air school, to improve the health of children—specifically those susceptible to tuberculosis. Located in Grunewald, a forest in Charlottenburg, the school soon became a model replicated across Europe and North America. The school–now known as the Wald-Grundschule (trans. Forest Elementary School)–and today functioning as a regular primary school–celebrated its 120th anniversary in 2024.

Bendix published numerous articles on pediatrics in medical journals, and in 1899 he authored Lehrbuch der Kinderheilkunde für Ärzte und Studierende (trans.Textbook of Pediatrics for Physicians and Students), which soon became a standard reference in pediatric medicine in Germany. In 1910, a book review in the Journal of the American Medical Association described Bendix as "one of Germany's greatest pediatricians." The textbook was published in eight editions and translated into French, Italian, Russian, and Spanish.

After the Nazi Party came to power in Germany, Bendix, who was Jewish, was barred from practicing and teaching medicine. In 1939, he emigrated to Egypt.
