= An Atlas of Illustrations of Clinical Medicine, Surgery and Pathology =

1901 book

- Language: English
- Published: 1901
- Publisher: John Bale, Sons & Danielsson

An Atlas of Illustrations of Clinical Medicine, Surgery and Pathology is a medical book of images first published in 1901 by John Bale, Sons & Danielsson. It contains the widely cited photograph taken by Allan Warner of two 13-year-old boys from the same class, who after coming into contact with smallpox, the vaccinated boy remained well and the boy who did not receive the vaccine developed the disease.

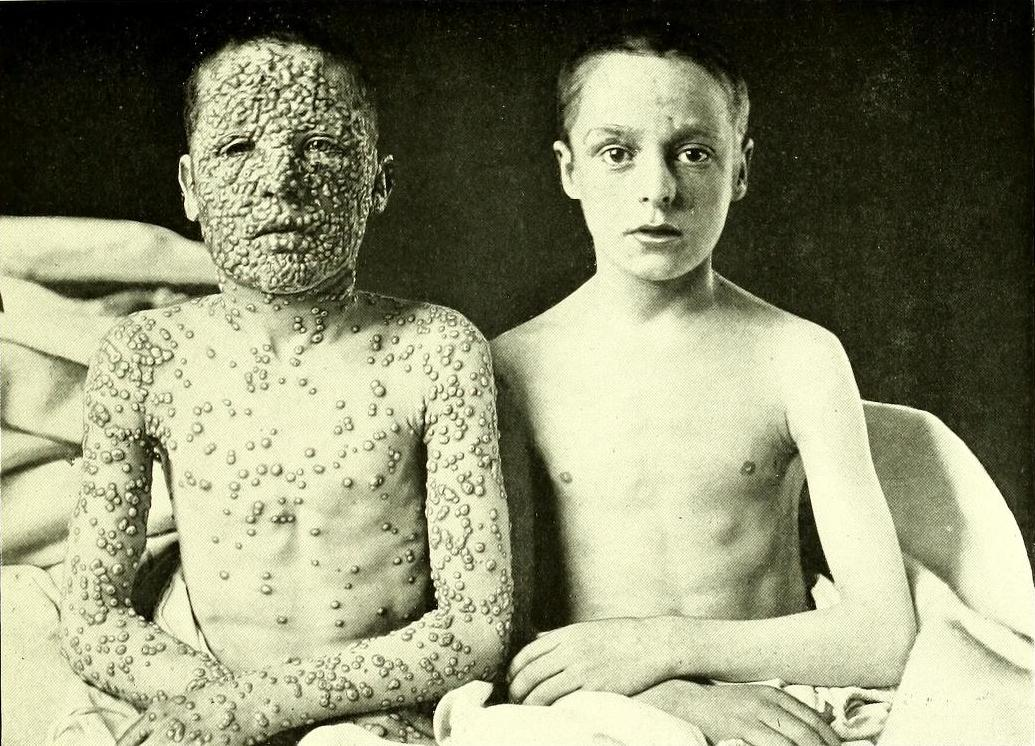
Photograph of two boys; one with smallpox (Atlas of Clinical Medicine, Surgery, and Pathology, 1901)
