= Hermann Neufert =

Hermann Neufert (6 July 1858 in Altstadt near Lüben, Province of Silesia, Kingdom of Prussia – 1935 in Berlin, Germany) was a German educator who founded (along with Prof. Dr. Bernhard Bendix) the world's first open air school, and the international movement which followed.

Neufert visited schools in Lähn and Groß-Glogau, where he graduated his secondary education in 1877. At Silesian Frederick William University he studied History, Geography and German studies. In March 1883 he got his doctoral degree. In May 1884 he passed an equivalent of today's state examinations, then called examen pro facultate docendi. After a compulsory probationary year between Easter 1884 and Easter 1885 which he served partially at the two secondary schools Maria-Magdalenen-Gymnasium and Johannes-Gymnasium at Breslau he started as a regular teacher at the latter. After six years, at Easter 1891 he got a call to Städtische Höhere Lehranstalt zu Charlottenburg near Berlin which was also a secondary school. He taught there for eight years. On 1 April 1899 he got schools inspector of the city of Charlottenburg.

In 1904, Neufert, together with Bernhard Bendix, founded the Waldschule für kränkliche Kinder (trans. Forest School for Sickly Children) the world's first open-air school, to improve the health of children—specifically those susceptible to tuberculosis. Located in Grunewald, a forest in Charlottenburg, the school soon became a model replicated across Europe and North America. The school–now known as the Wald-Grundschule (trans. Forest Elementary School)–and today functioning as a regular primary school–celebrated its 125th anniversary in 2024.
