= Alan Warner =

Alan Warner may refer to:

- Alan Warner (novelist) (born 1964), Scottish novelist
- Alan Warner (cricketer) (born 1957), English cricketer
- Alan Warner (musician) (born 1947), English musician

== See also ==
- Allan Warner (disambiguation)
