= Open-air treatment =

Therapeutic fresh air and sunshine

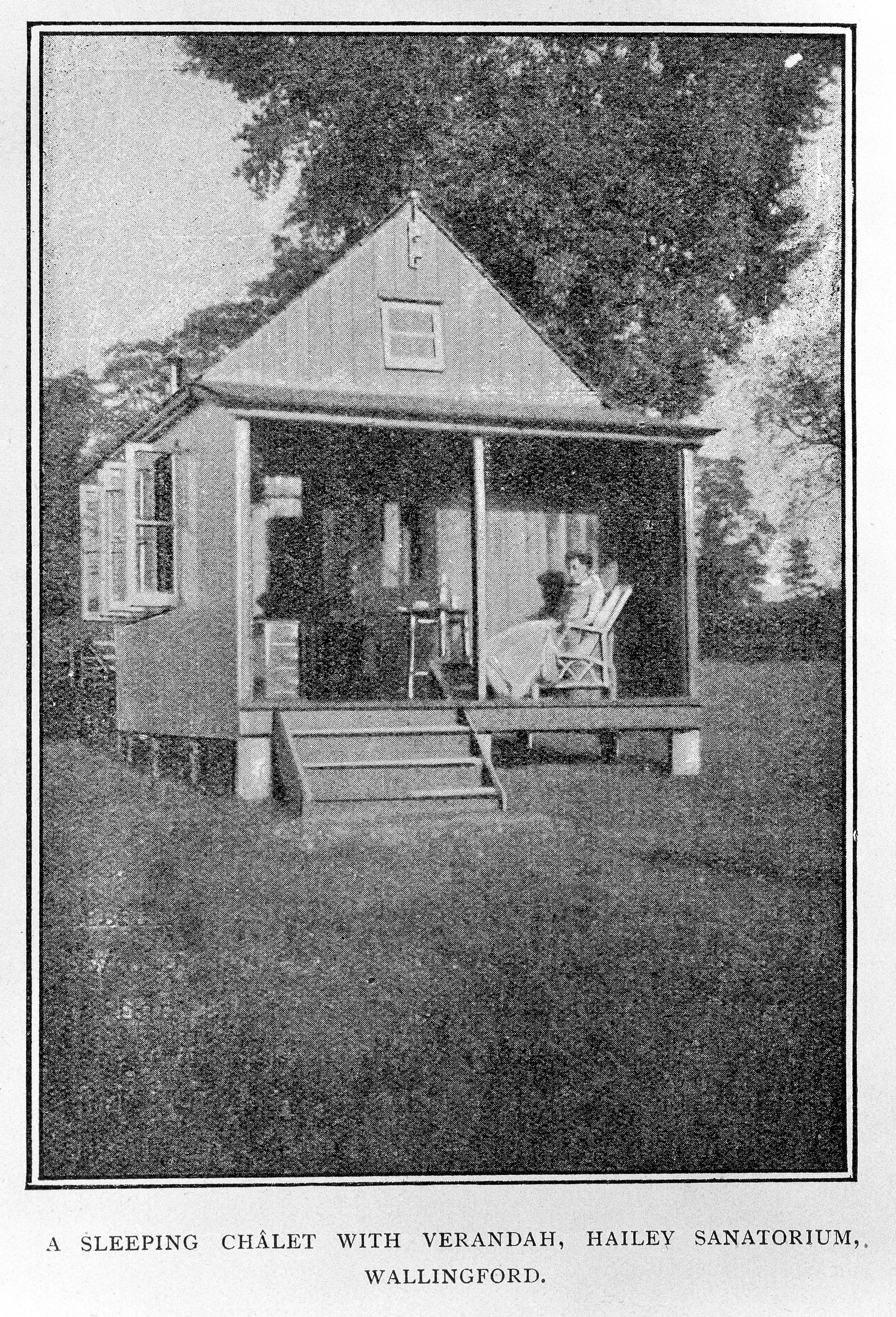
A patient on the veranda of a sleeping chalet with wide open windows at the Hailey Sanitorium in Wallingford.

Open-air treatment is the therapeutic use of fresh air and sunshine. In a hospital or sanitorium, this may be done by ensuring good ventilation in an airy, sunny room or by housing patients outdoors in tents or other open forms of accommodation. During the 20th century, such treatment was used for people with infectious respiratory diseases such as influenza or tuberculosis.

In the 1960s, researchers into biological warfare found that microbes such as Escherichia coli were killed when exposed to outdoor air but that, when they were enclosed, they would remain viable for longer. They called this the open air factor but were unable to identify the exact mechanism or disinfecting agent.

Open-air schools were established in several countries to provide a healthy environment for sickly children, emphasising fresh air, good food and exercise. In England, the first one opened at Bostall Wood in 1907 and, by the 1930s, there were over a hundred across the country.
