= Waldschule für kränkliche Kinder =

School in Germany

Waldschule für kränkliche Kinder (translated: forest school for sickly children) was the first open air school, built in Westend of Charlottenburg, Germany in 1904 by Walther Spickendorff, a city architect. The school was founded by the pediatrist Bernhard Bendix and Berlin's school inspector Hermann Neufert. It led to the beginning of the open air school movement which quickly spread across Europe and North America. Approval for the school was granted by the local authority in June 1904 and it opened on August 1. Spickendorff designed the school to provide the most exposure to the sun. The school took its name from its situation within a pine tree forest, the Grunewald, part of Germany's capital since 1920.

The school–now known as the Wald-Grundschule (trans. Forest Elementary School)–and today functioning as a regular primary school–celebrated its 120th anniversary in 2024.
