= Open air school =

Therapeutic school

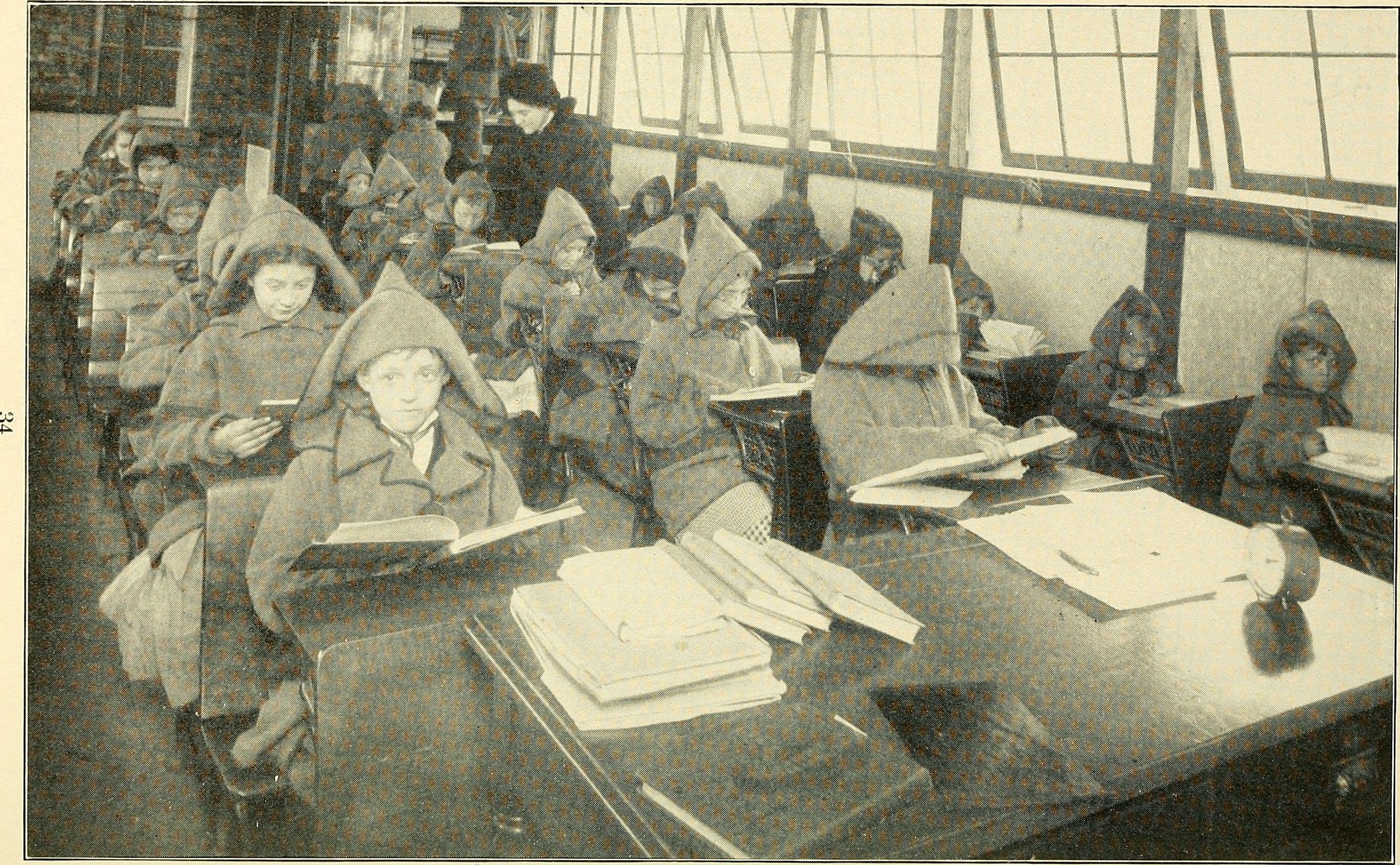
The "open-air crusaders" of Elizabeth McCormick Open air School, Chicago, US, 1911

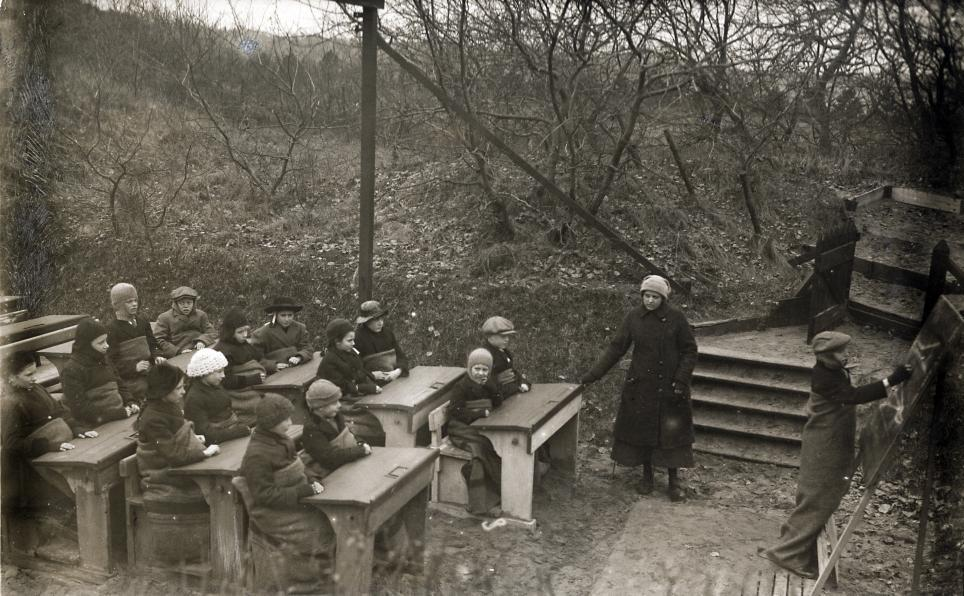
Open air school in the Netherlands, 1918

Open air schools or schools of the woods were purpose-built educational institutions for children, that were designed to prevent and combat the widespread rise of tuberculosis that occurred in the period leading up to the Second World War. The schools were built to provide open-air therapy so that fresh air, good ventilation and exposure to the outside would improve the children's health. The schools were mostly built in areas away from city centers, sometimes in rural locations, to provide a space free from pollution and overcrowding. The creation and design of the schools paralleled that of the tuberculosis sanatoriums, in that hygiene and exposure to fresh air were paramount.

== Background ==
The schools were purpose-built educational institutions for children, that were designed to prevent and combat the widespread rise of tuberculosis that occurred in the period leading up to the Second World War. The schools were built on the concept that fresh air, good ventilation and exposure to the outside contributed to improved health. The schools were mostly built in areas away from city centers, sometimes in rural locations, to provide a space free from pollution and overcrowding. The creation and design of the schools paralleled that of the tuberculosis sanatoriums, in that hygiene and exposure to fresh air were paramount. Schools were considered to be part of the anti-tuberculosis campaign.

== Daily life ==
The schools were residential, "set up in tents, prefabricated barracks, or repurposed structures, and were run during the summer". Children were taught in classrooms designed to be partially (in rooms with large open windows) or fully exposed to outdoors, and sleeping was done outside or in wards that were exposed to the elements.

== Architectural design ==
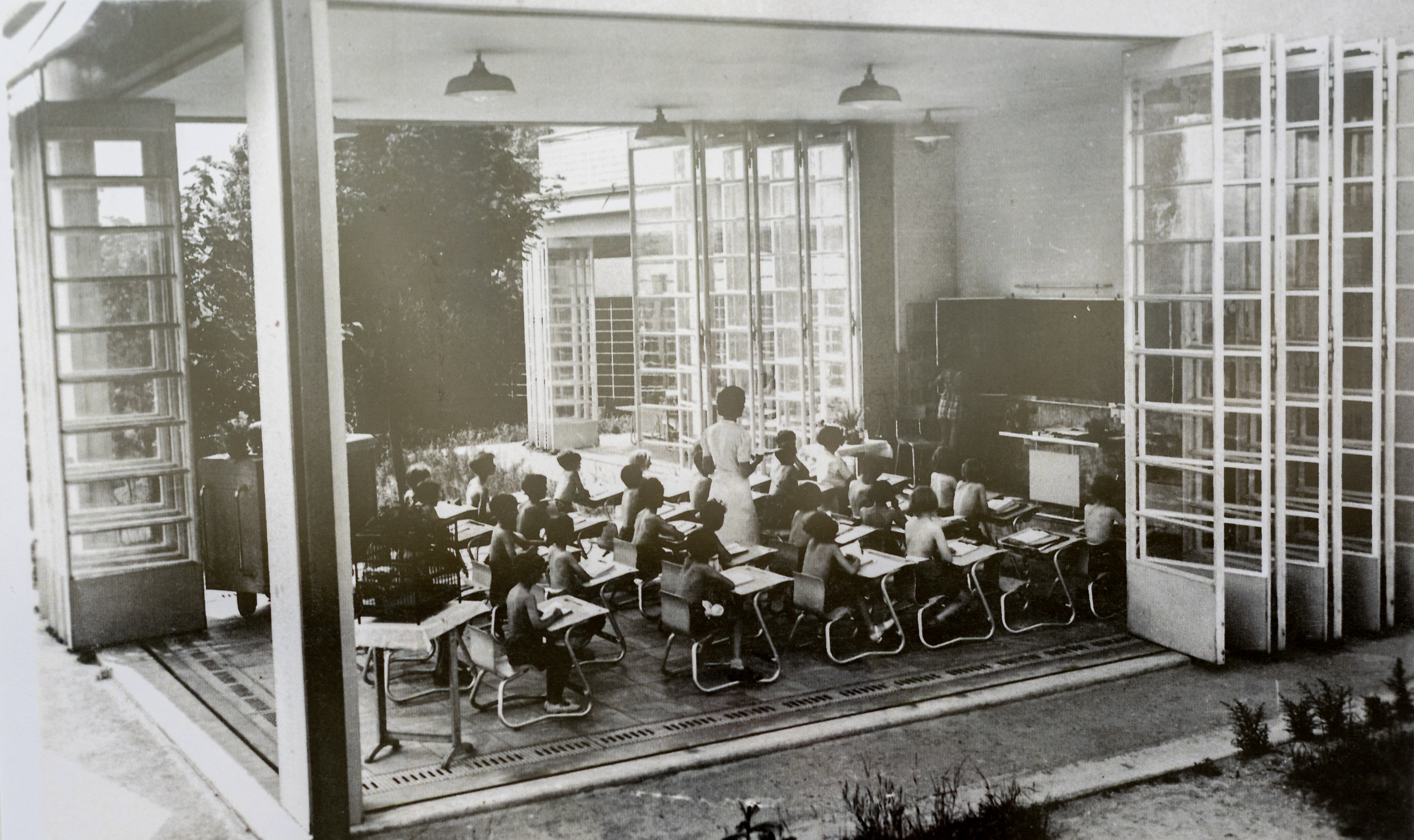
École de plein air de Suresnes, France, undated

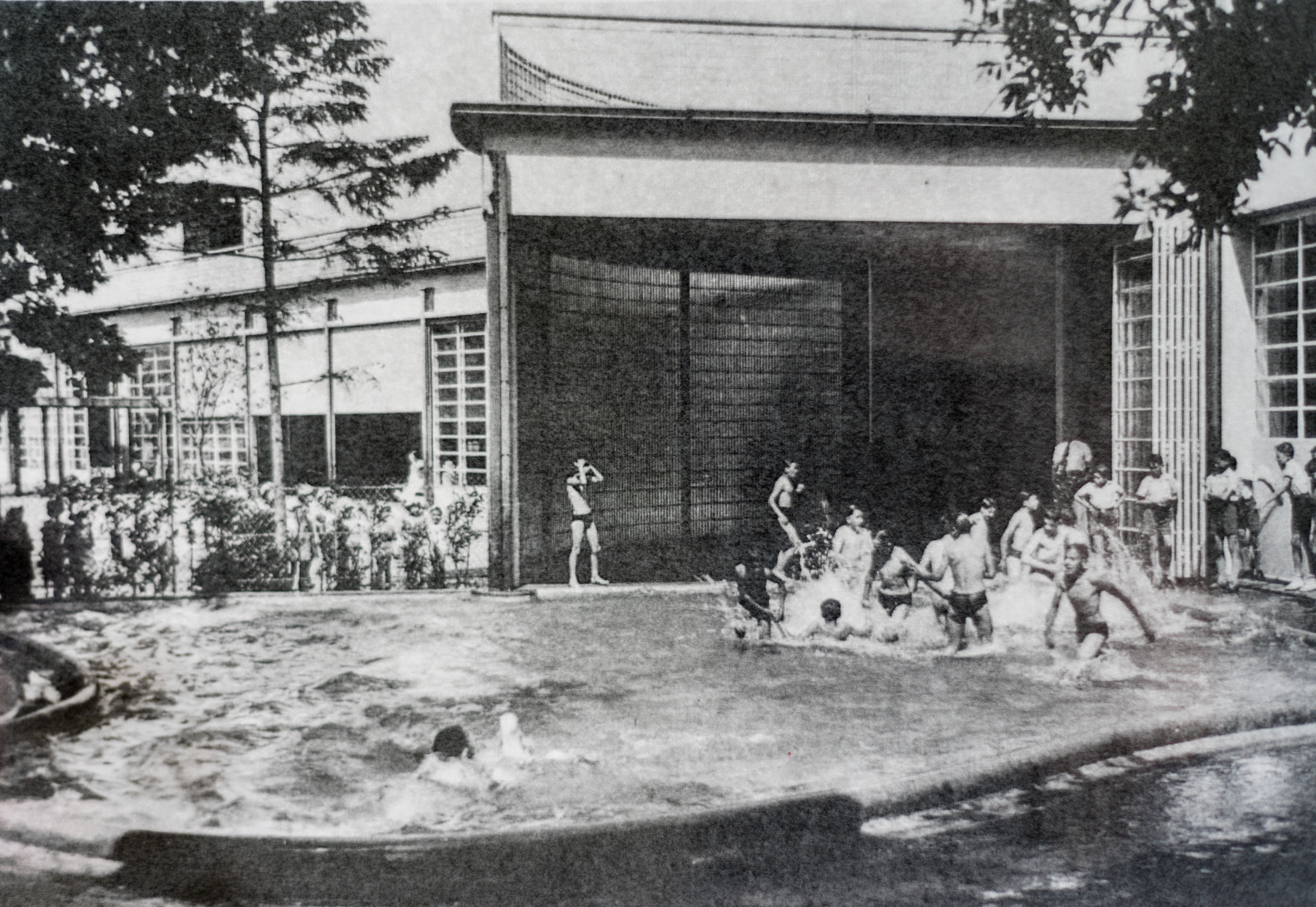
École de plein air de Suresnes, France, undated

The architecture of some more advanced open air schools in Britain and Europe was built on the traditional 'pavilion plan' which was also used for sanatoria, with a similar internal layout to that used in hospital architecture, with long window-lined hallways. A distinguished example is the École de plein air de Suresnes not far from Paris, which was built by Eugène Beaudouin and Marcel Lods at Mont Valérien between 1932 and 1935.

== Open-air school movement ==
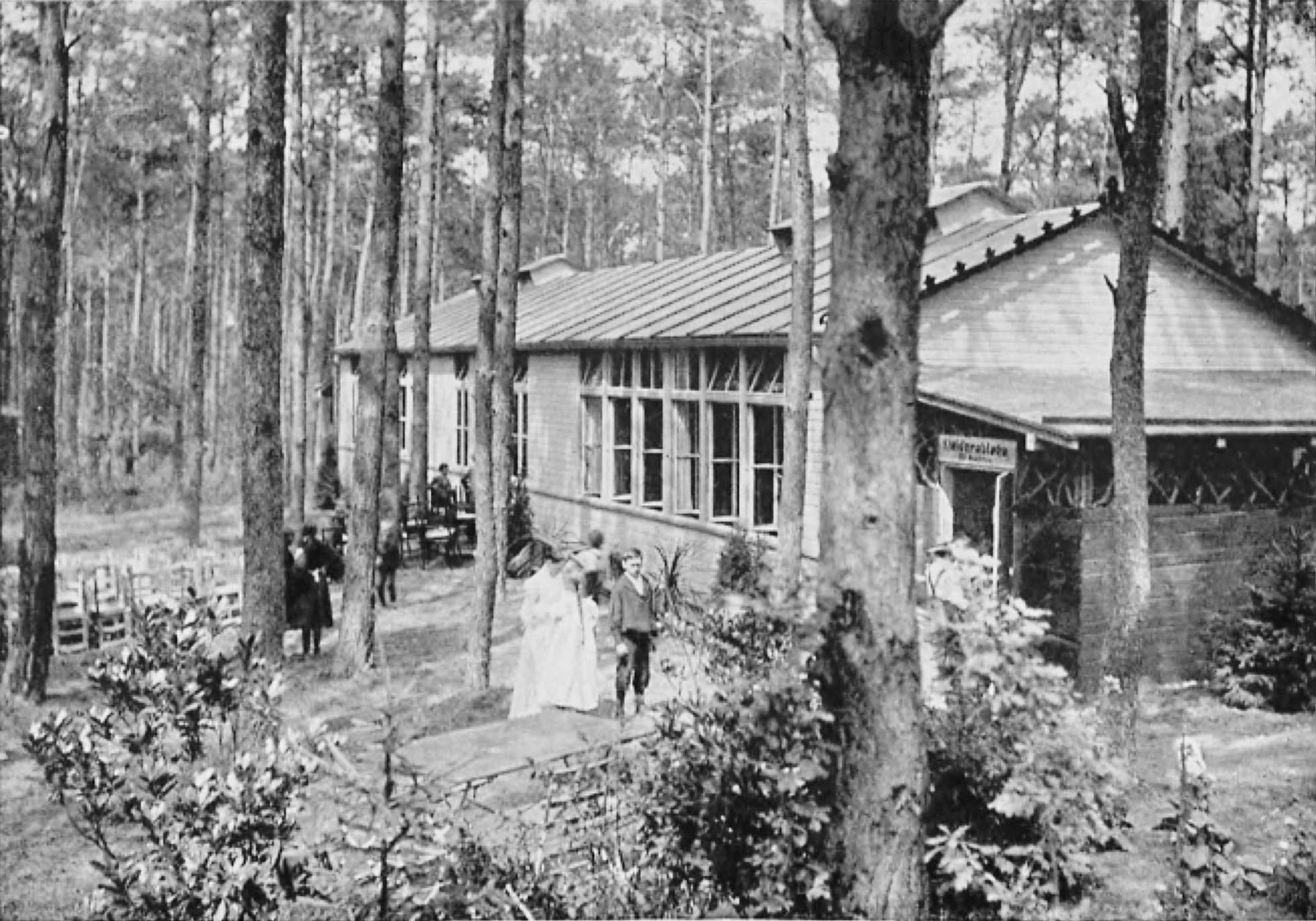
Waldschule für kränkliche Kinder (Forest school for sickly children) in Charlottenburg near Berlin (1904)

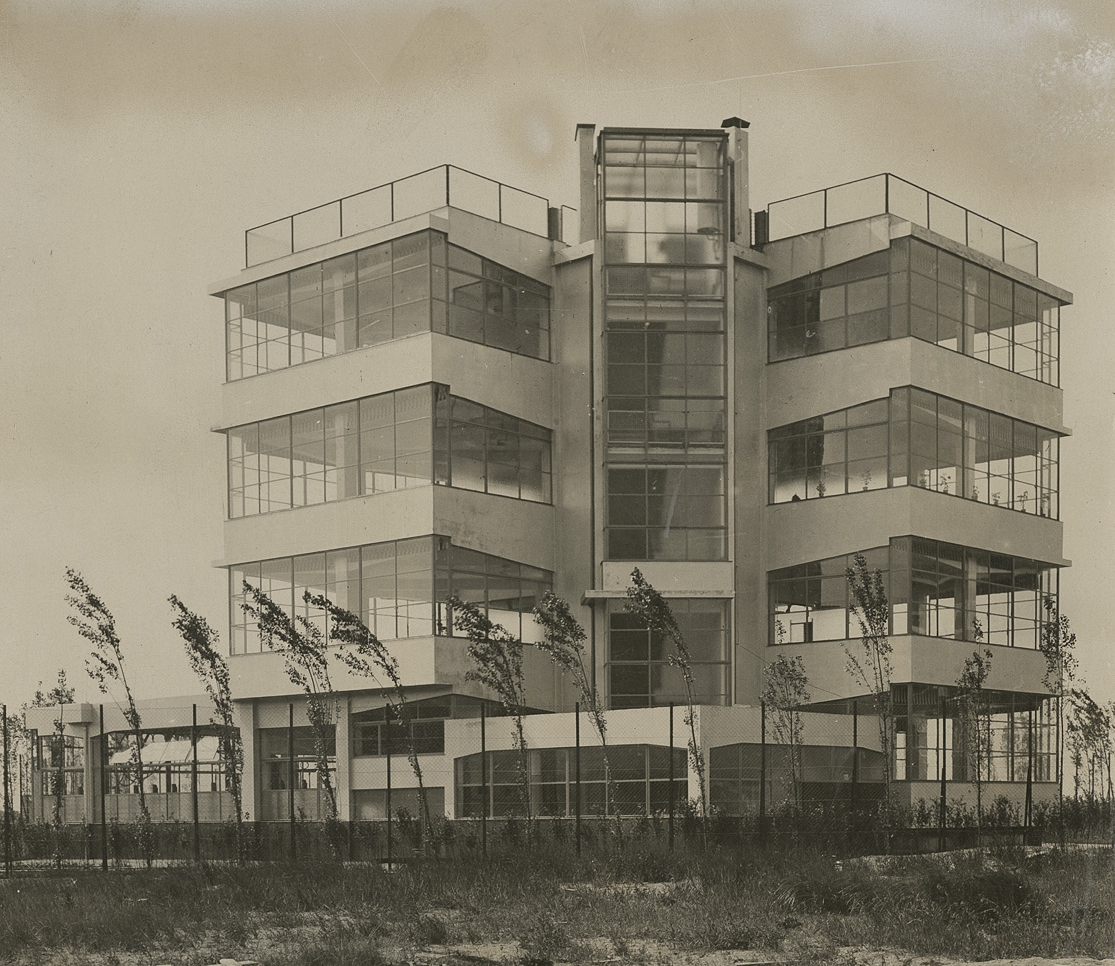
Johannes Duiker: Openluchtschool voor het gezonde kind (Open air school for the healthy child), Amsterdam, 1930

=== Waldschule für kränkliche Kinder, Charlottenburg ===
Open Air Schools were part of a larger open-air school movement which began in Europe with the creation of the Waldschule für kränkliche Kinder (translated: forest school for sickly children), in Charlottenburg, Germany, near Berlin, in 1904. Built by Walter Spickendorff (born 1864) and founded by the paediatrist Prof. Dr. Bernhard Bendix and Berlin's schools inspector Hermann Neufert it offered "open-air therapy" to urban youths with pre-tuberculosis as part of an experiment conducted by the International Congresses of Hygiene. Classes were taught and fed in the surrounding forest. The movement quickly caught on throughout Europe and North America; construction of the buildings began in the first decade of the 20th century and carried on until the 1970s.

=== Europe ===
After the opening of the Waldschule Charlottenburg, schools were opened in Belgium in 1904 and continue in Switzerland, Italy, and France in 1907. Schools were also started in Hungary in 1910, and Sweden in 1914. On May 18, 1913, a scuola all'aperto was opened in Niguarda near Milan, in the grounds of the Villa degli Arcimboldi. The school taught 39 boys and 30 girls.

=== England ===
The first open air school in England was built in London, in 1907 at Bostall Wood, Plumstead by London County Council. Another was built in 1908 by sisters Rachel and Margaret Macmillan, as the "first School Clinic". In 1914 the sisters organized an open air school in the garden of Evelyn House, Deptford where the children lived and slept under canvas. In Bristol the first Open Air School was opened in October 1913 in Knowle. By 1937 there were 96 open air day schools in operation throughout Britain, and 53 that were also residential. Leicester opened its first open air school, the Western Park Open Air School, on 7 November 1930.

=== America ===
In America, the first "fresh-air school" was established in 1908 with the building of a school in Providence, Rhode Island.

=== Australia ===
In Queensland open-air schools were constructed for only a short period and were not to become a permanent feature of that state's school architecture. The problems associated with these schools outweighed the advantages and by 1922 the open-air school was phased out and more traditional designs reappeared.

Abbotsholme College in Sydney was designed as an open-air school.
