= Western Park, Leicester =

Park and surrounding suburb in West End of Leicester, England

Coordinates: 52.635°N 1.176°W

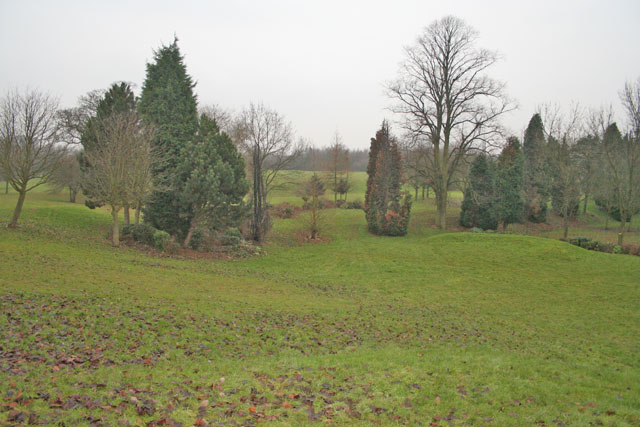
Western Park northern view from the tennis courts.

Western Park is a park and surrounding suburb located in West End of Leicester. It is also a ward of the City of Leicester whose population at the 2011 census was 10,609.

The park itself was bought for £30,000 in 1897 and at 178 acres (0.72 km^{2}) is the biggest in Leicester. While the park has a "blend of meadows, mature woods and hedgerows" the park also contains a large number of sporting facilities including a BMX track, a skate ramp, a baseball field, two bowling greens, five football pitches, six cricket pitches (all with associated changing facilities) and six tennis courts. Until the 1950s the Park's tennis courts, then located to the far west of the Park, were the home of Westcotes Church Tennis Club and then Westfields Lawn Tennis Club. The club later moved to a site on the nearby Eastfield Road; the courts on Western Park are now open to the public.

Since 2008, the full-sized baseball field at the southwest end of park has been home to the Leicester Blue Sox Baseball Club. The Blue Sox have been British Baseball Federation national baseball champions in 2009 and 2012. The club has adult and youth teams and is open to players of all ages and abilities.

Until May 2013 the former park warden's lodge was home to the environmental charity Groundworks Leicester & Leicestershire, formerly known as Environ. This building was called the "Eco House" after being converted as a show house, used to demonstrate ways of making homes more environmentally friendly. It was open to the public and held one-off events as well as receiving visits from local schools. The Eco House and the neighbouring recycling centre were part of the larger Groundwork UK network.

A voluntary group, The Friends of Western Park, works with the city council to "improve the park for everyone".

The area of Leicester sharing the park's name is a generally affluent area to the South and East of the park. The suburb also contains Dovelands Primary School which caters for 550 3–11-year olds, including nursery school children. St. Anne's Parish Church, and the aforementioned Westfields Tennis Club. The club has four floodlit courts and caters to both children and adults from the local area and beyond. Christ the King Roman Catholic primary school, rated "outstanding" by Ofsted hosts two sites, the infant site at the top of Western Park and the junior site further down on Glenfield Road.

== Council Election result, 2011 ==
Western Park (2)
Party	Candidate	Votes	%	±%
Labour	Susan Barton	1,295		
Labour	George Coles	1,214		
Liberal Democrats	Peter Coley	973		
Conservative	James Smyth	753		
Liberal Democrats	Stuart Emmerson	627		
Conservative	Jacob Wilkinson	616		
Green	Alexander Scott	350		
UKIP	Carol Young	129		
UKIP	Kevin Young	93		
Liberal	Sarah Euston	76		
Turnout		3,338		
Labour gain from Liberal Democrats		Swing		
Labour gain from Liberal Democrats		Swing		

== Council Election result, 2007 ==
Western Park (2)
Party	Candidate	Votes	%	±%
Liberal Democrats	Roger Blackmore	1,297	24%	
Liberal Democrats	Peter Coley	1,198	22%	
Labour	Neil Clayon	609	11%	
Labour	Peter Mason	600	11%	
Conservative	Frances Ashlin	544	10%	
Conservative	Julian John	515	9%	
Green	Christopher Seal	358	7%	
Green	Brian Fewster	353	6%	
Turnout		2,871		
Liberal Democrats hold		Swing		
Liberal Democrats hold		Swing		

== Council By Election result, 1992 ==
Western Park (2)
Party	Candidate	Votes	%	±%
Liberal Democrats	Peter Coley	1,011	38.2%	+22.2
Conservative	David Dalby	859	32.5%	−9.6
Labour	Paul Bodell	731	27.6%	−10.8%
Green	Geoff Forse	46	1.7%	−1.7
Majority		152	5.7%	
Turnout		2648	31.2%	
Liberal Democrats gain from Conservative		Swing	+15.9	

== Council Election result, 1983 ==
Western Park (2)
Party	Candidate	Votes	%	±%
Conservative	Stewart Hill	2,179		
Conservative	Sydney Phipps	2,152		
Labour	David Collins	1,328		
Labour	Eric Taylor	1,220		
SDP	Phillip Meadhurst	479		
SDP	Lisa Brown	493		
Green	Christopher Seal	358		
Turnout		4,090	44.6%	
Conservative hold		Swing		
Conservative hold		Swing		
