= Allan Warner (physician) =

British physician (1871–1952)

- Born: c. 1871; Finchley, Middlesex, England
- Died: 24 May 1952; Leicestershire, England
- Occupation: Chief medical officer of health (Leicester)
- Medical career
- Profession: Physician

Allan Warner (c. 1871 – 24 May 1952), was a British physician who served as Leicester's chief medical officer of health. His photographs of various stages of smallpox, taken at Leicester smallpox isolation hospital, appeared in An Atlas of Illustrations of Clinical Medicine, Surgery and Pathology in 1901. Later, he had administrative roles at the Western Park Open Air School and acted as the medical advisor to Leicester's Mental Deficiency committee.

== Early life and family ==
Allan Warner was born in Finchley, Middlesex, around 1871. He married Elizabeth Maud, eight years his junior, around 1907. By 1911, they had two children, John and Mary.

== Photographs ==
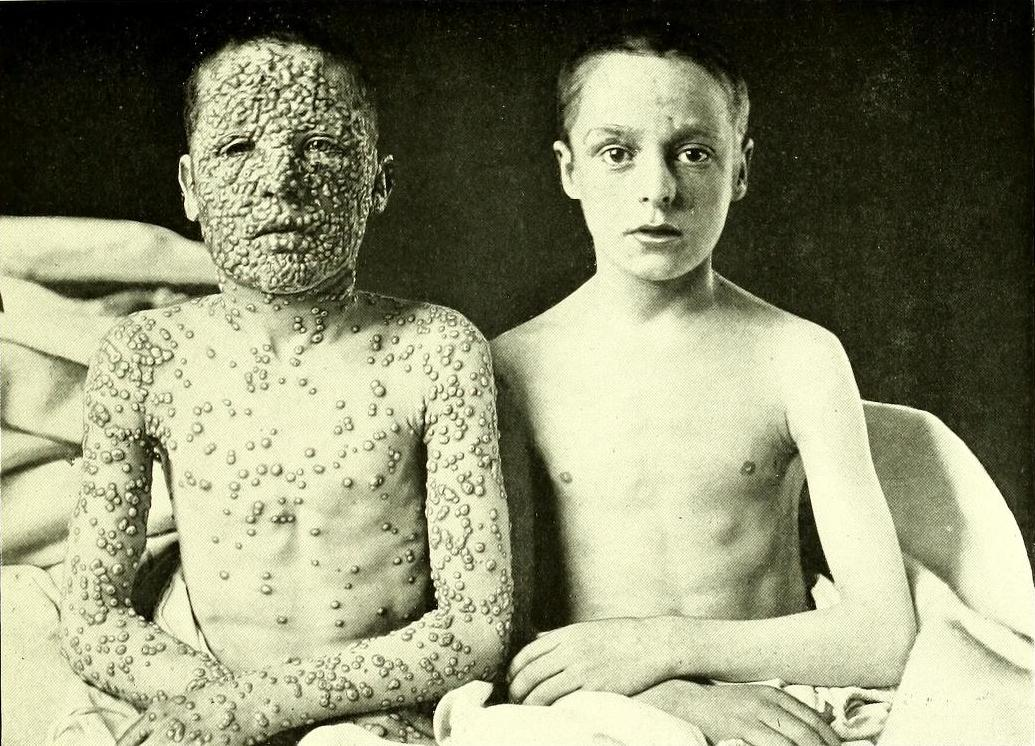
Photograph of two boys who came in contact with smallpox (Atlas of Clinical Medicine, Surgery, and Pathology, 1901)

Warner's photographs of various stages of smallpox, taken at Leicester smallpox isolation hospital, appeared in An Atlas of Illustrations of Clinical Medicine, Surgery and Pathology (1901). At the time, he was Leicester's assistant medical officer of health.

== Western Park Open Air School ==
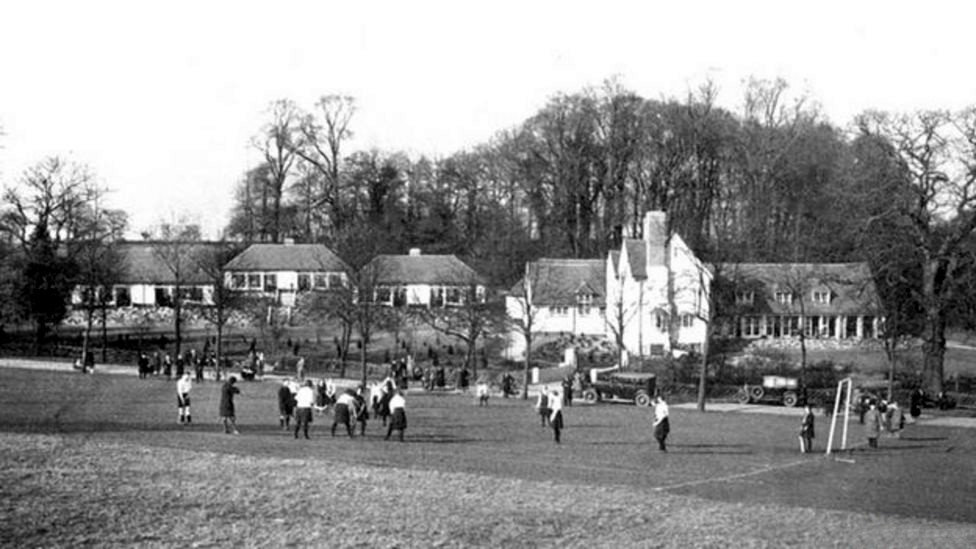
Western Park Open Air School

In 1931, as Leicester's chief school medical officer of health, Warner, in the committee minutes, described the Western Park Open Air School as having a "healthy environment" that could put right a "child's nervous activity which has degenerated owing to disuse". Two years earlier he had maintained that "many health movements" had produced a "health conscience" which in turn expanded the Leicester School Medical Service. He described the aim of the school as to "so train the children that they would eventually become hardy men and women", something he felt was important for a good citizen in the interwar years. In contrast were the "overcrowded sunless rooms" of the schools in the city centre, with "stagnant humid atmosphere of the overcrowded house". This he felt "resulted in children that were "incapable of strenuous muscular action and over sensitive to pain". In one later report, Warner recited George Newman: "the existence and strength of the nation ultimately depends upon the survival of its children and their physical and mental health".

== School Medical Service ==
He wrote of rising costs of the School Medical Service, and that "parents with tuberculosis should be prevented from having more children". He acted as the medical advisor to Leicester's Mental Deficiency committee, and calculated that Leicester had "60 lower grade children and 300 adult defectives". He "suggested that idiots and imbeciles should be put in an institution, low-grade children could be left with the parents, and the feeble minded segregated so that they could not reproduce".

== Death ==
Warner died on 24 May 1952 at the Regent Road Hospital in Leicester, at the age of 81. He was survived by his wife Elizabeth Maud.
